= Taiyō Station =

Railway station in Hokota, Ibaraki Prefecture, Japan

Taiyō Station 大洋駅
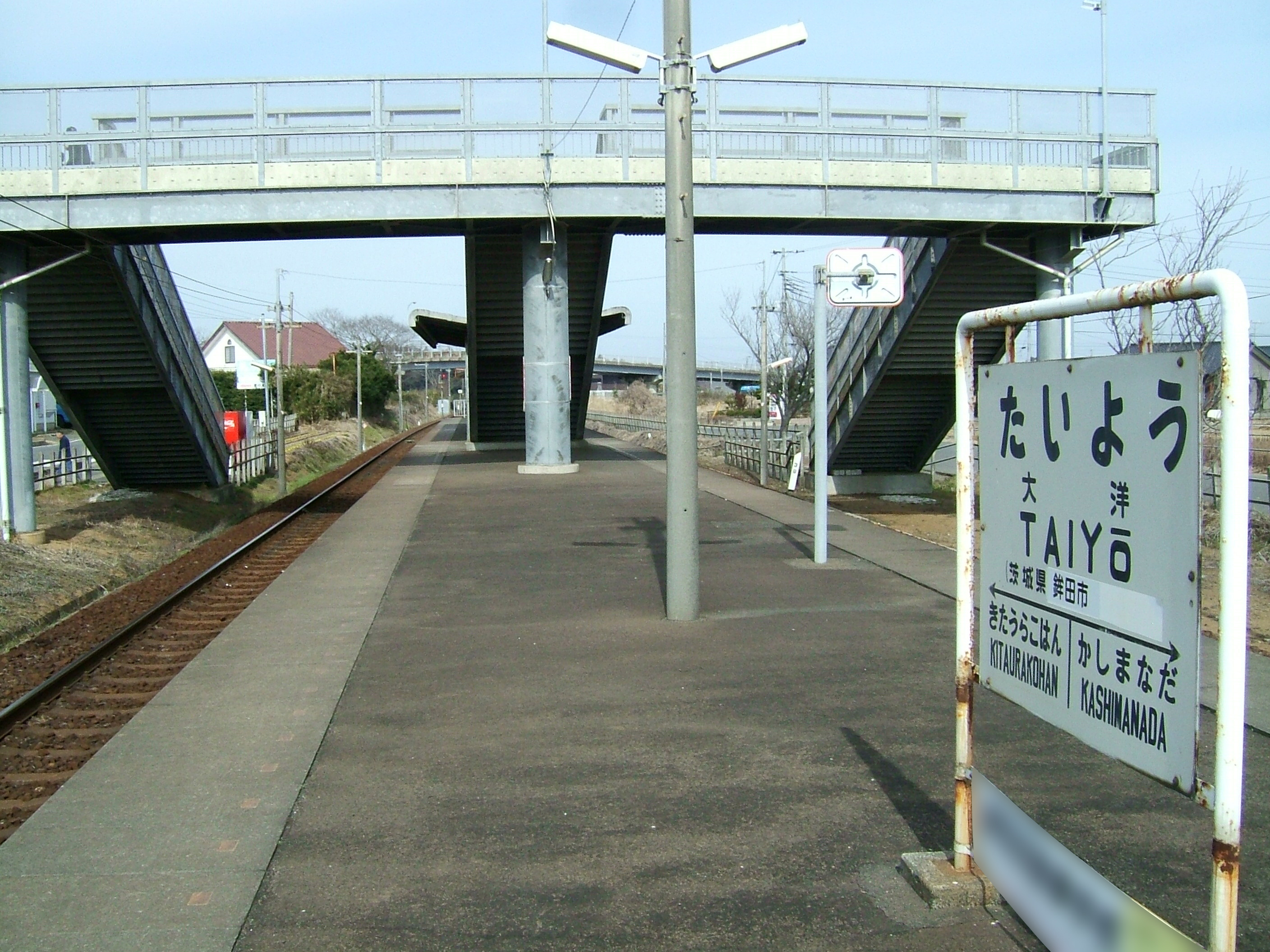
- Taiyō Station, March 2008

General information
- Location: Kumiage 2676-3, Hokota-she, Ibaraki-ken 311-2103; Japan
- Coordinates: 36.1085°N 140.5762°E
- Operator: Kashima Rinkai Tetsudo
- Line: ■ Ōarai-Kashima Line
- Distance: 39.0 km from Mito
- Platforms: 2 (1 island platform)
- Connections: Bus terminal

Construction
- Structure type: At-grade

Other information
- Status: Unstaffed
- Website: Official website

History
- Opened: 14 March 1985

Passengers
- FY2015: 239 daily

Services
Preceding station	Kashima Rinkai Railway	Following station
Kitaurakohan towards Mito	Ōarai Kashima Line	Kashimanada towards Kashimajingū
Location
- Location within Ibaraki Prefecture Location within Japan

Taiyō Station (大洋駅, Taiyō-eki) is a passenger railway station in the town of Hokota, Ibaraki Prefecture, Japan operated by the third sector Kashima Rinkai Railway.

== Lines ==
Taiyō Station is served by the Kashima Rinkai Railway’s Ōarai Kashima Line, and is located 39.0 km from the official starting point of the line at Mito Station.

== Station layout ==
The station consists of a single island platform, connected to the road and parking lot by footbridges. There is no station building, and the station is unattended.

=== Platforms ===
1	■ Ōarai Kashima Line	for Kashimajingū
2	■ Ōarai Kashima Line	for Ōarai and Mito

== History ==
Taiyō Station was opened on 14 March 1985 with the opening of the Ōarai Kashima Line.

== Passenger statistics ==
In fiscal 2015, the station was used by an average of 239 passengers daily.

== Surrounding area ==
- National Route 51
- National Route 354
- former Taiyō Village Hall
- Kumiage Post Office

== See also ==
- List of railway stations in Japan
