= Chōjagahamashiosaihamanasukōenmae Station =

Railway station in Kashima, Ibaraki Prefecture, Japan

Chōjagahamashiosaihamanasukōenmae Station 長者ヶ浜潮騒はまなす公園前駅
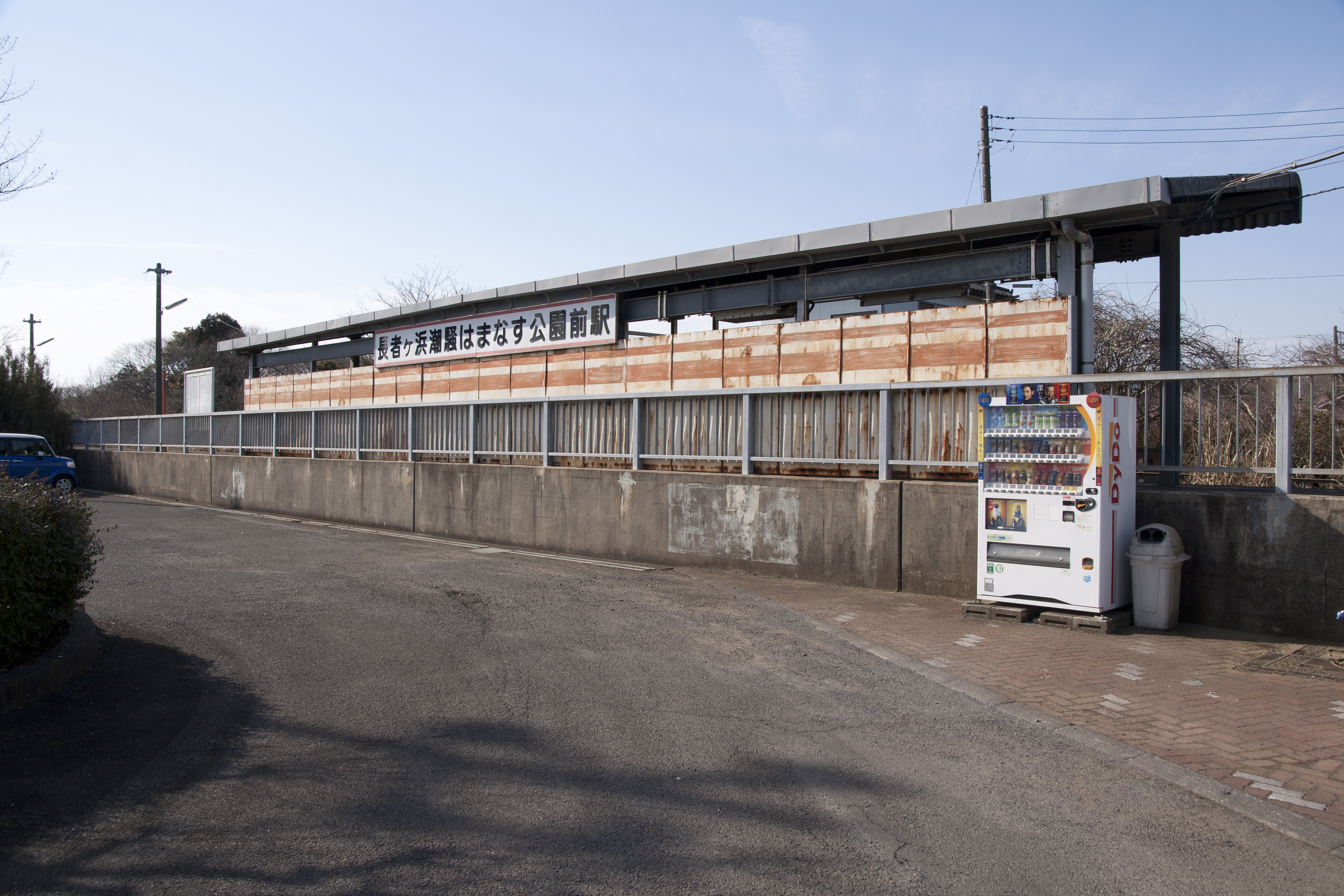

General information
- Location: Tsunoore 2273-17, Kashima-shi, Ibaraki-ken 311-2212; Japan
- Coordinates: 36.0315°N 140.619°E
- Operator: Kashima Rinkai Tetsudo
- Line: ■ Ōarai-Kashima Line
- Distance: 48.4 km from Mito
- Platforms: 1 (1 side platform)
- Connections: Bus terminal

Construction
- Structure type: At-grade

Other information
- Status: Unstaffed
- Website: Official website

History
- Opened: 11 November 1990

Passengers
- FY2015: 63 daily

Services
| Preceding station | Kashima Rinkai Railway | Following station |
|---|---|---|
| Kashima-Ōno towards Mito | Ōarai Kashima Line | Kōyadai towards Kashimajingū |
Location
- Location within Ibaraki Prefecture Location within Japan

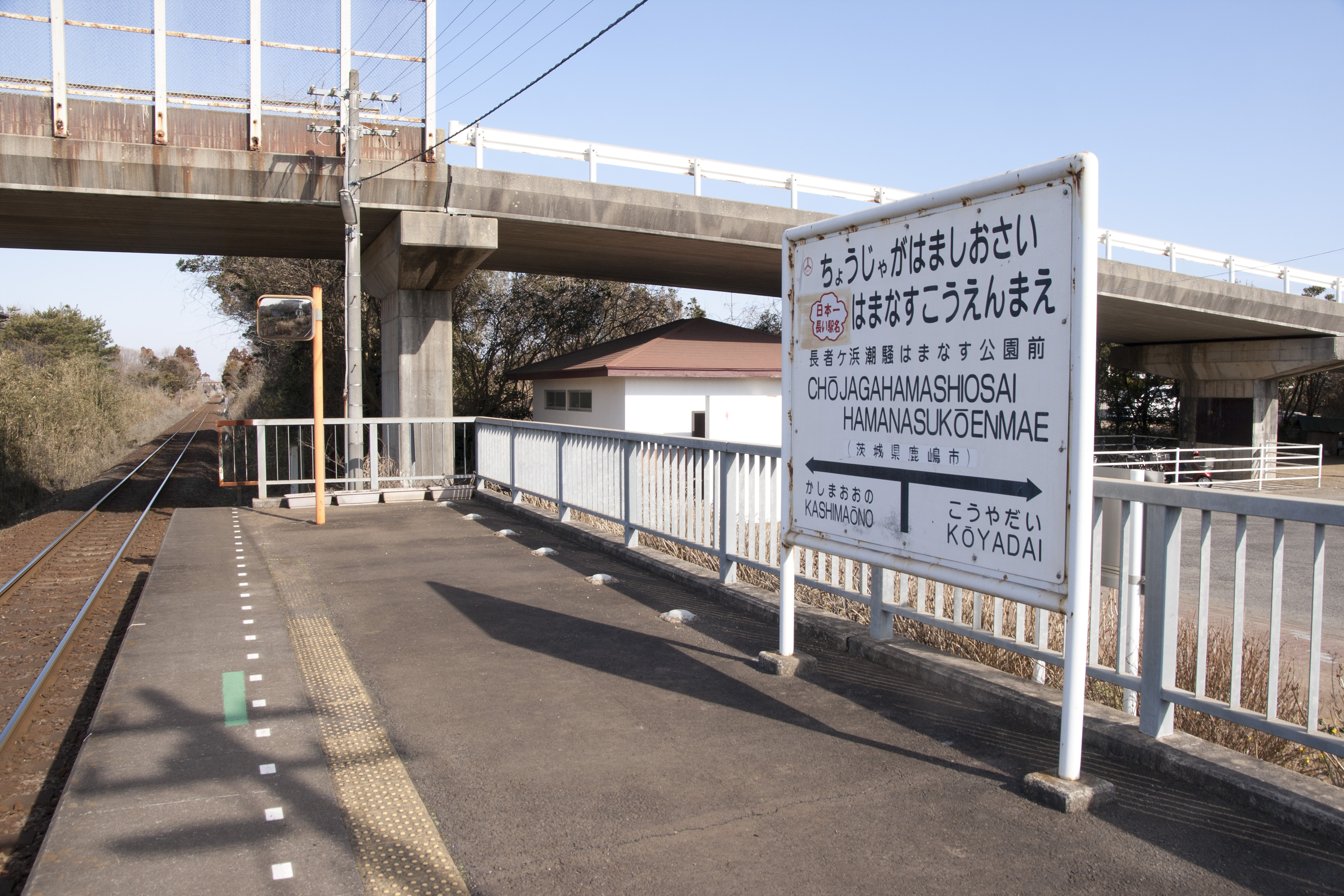
Signage showing one of the longest station names in Japan

Chōjagahamashiosaihamanasukōenmae Station (長者ヶ浜潮騒はまなす公園前駅, Chōjagahama Shiosai Hamanasu Kōenmae-eki; "in front of the park of sea roar and rugosa roses by Chojagahama beach") is a passenger railway station in the town of Kashima, Ibaraki Prefecture, Japan operated by the third sector Kashima Rinkai Railway.

The station was originally tied with Minamiaso Mizu-no-Umareru-Sato Hakusui-Kōgen Station in Kumamoto Prefecture for the longest train station name in Japan, with 22 hiragana characters each, until both were surpassed by Tōjiin Ritsumeikan University Station in Kyoto in 2020.

== Lines ==
Chōjagahamashiosaihamanasukōenmae Station is served by the Ōarai Kashima Line, and is located 48.4 km from the official starting point of the line at Mito Station.

== Station layout ==
The station consists of one elevated side platform, serving traffic in both directions. There is no station building and the station is unattended.

== History ==
Chōjagahamashiosaihamanasukōenmae Station was opened on 11 November 1990.

== Passenger statistics ==
In fiscal 2015, the station was used by an average of 63 passengers daily.

== Surrounding area ==
- National Route 51
- Shiosai Hamanasu Park

== See also ==
- List of railway stations in Japan
