= Kashimanada Station =

Railway station in Kashima, Ibaraki Prefecture, Japan

Kashimanada Station 鹿島灘駅
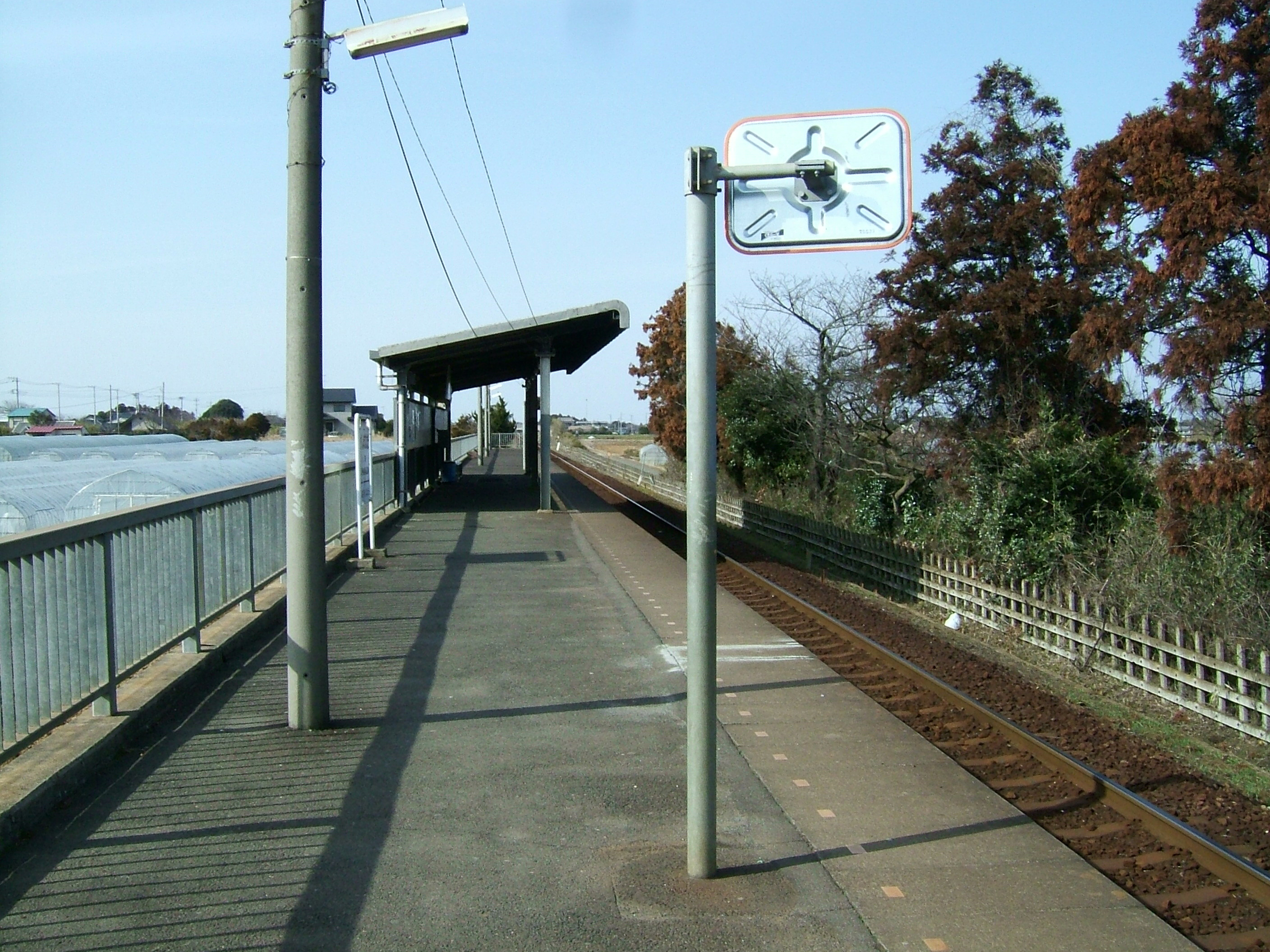
- Kashimanada Station, March 2008

General information
- Location: Daishoshizaki 1510-7, Kashima-shi, Ibaraki-ken 311-2201; Japan
- Coordinates: 36.0755°N 140.5967°E
- Operator: Kashima Rinkai Tetsudo
- Line: ■ Ōarai-Kashima Line
- Distance: 43.1 km from Mito
- Platforms: 1 (1 side platform)
- Connections: Bus terminal

Construction
- Structure type: At-grade

Other information
- Status: Unstaffed
- Website: Official website

History
- Opened: 14 March 1985

Passengers
- FY2015: 205 daily

Services
Preceding station	Kashima Rinkai Railway	Following station
Taiyō towards Mito	Ōarai Kashima Line	Kashima-Ōno towards Kashimajingū
Location
- Location within Ibaraki Prefecture Location within Japan

Kashimanada Station (鹿島灘駅, Kashimanada-eki) is a passenger railway station in the town of Kashima, Ibaraki Prefecture, Japan operated by the third sector Kashima Rinkai Railway.

== Lines ==
Kashimanada Station is served by the Ōarai Kashima Line, and is located 43.1 km from the official starting point of the line at Mito Station.

== Station layout ==
The station consists of a single side platform, serving traffic in both directions. There is no station building, and the station is unattended.

== History ==
Kashimanada Station was opened on 14 March 1985 with the opening of the Ōarai Kashima Line.

== Passenger statistics ==
In fiscal 2015, the station was used by an average of 205 passengers daily.

== Surrounding area ==
- National Route 51
- Arai Post Office
- former Ōno Village Hall

== See also ==
- List of railway stations in Japan
