= Kōyadai Station =

Railway station in Kashima, Ibaraki Prefecture, Japan

Kōyadai Station 荒野台駅
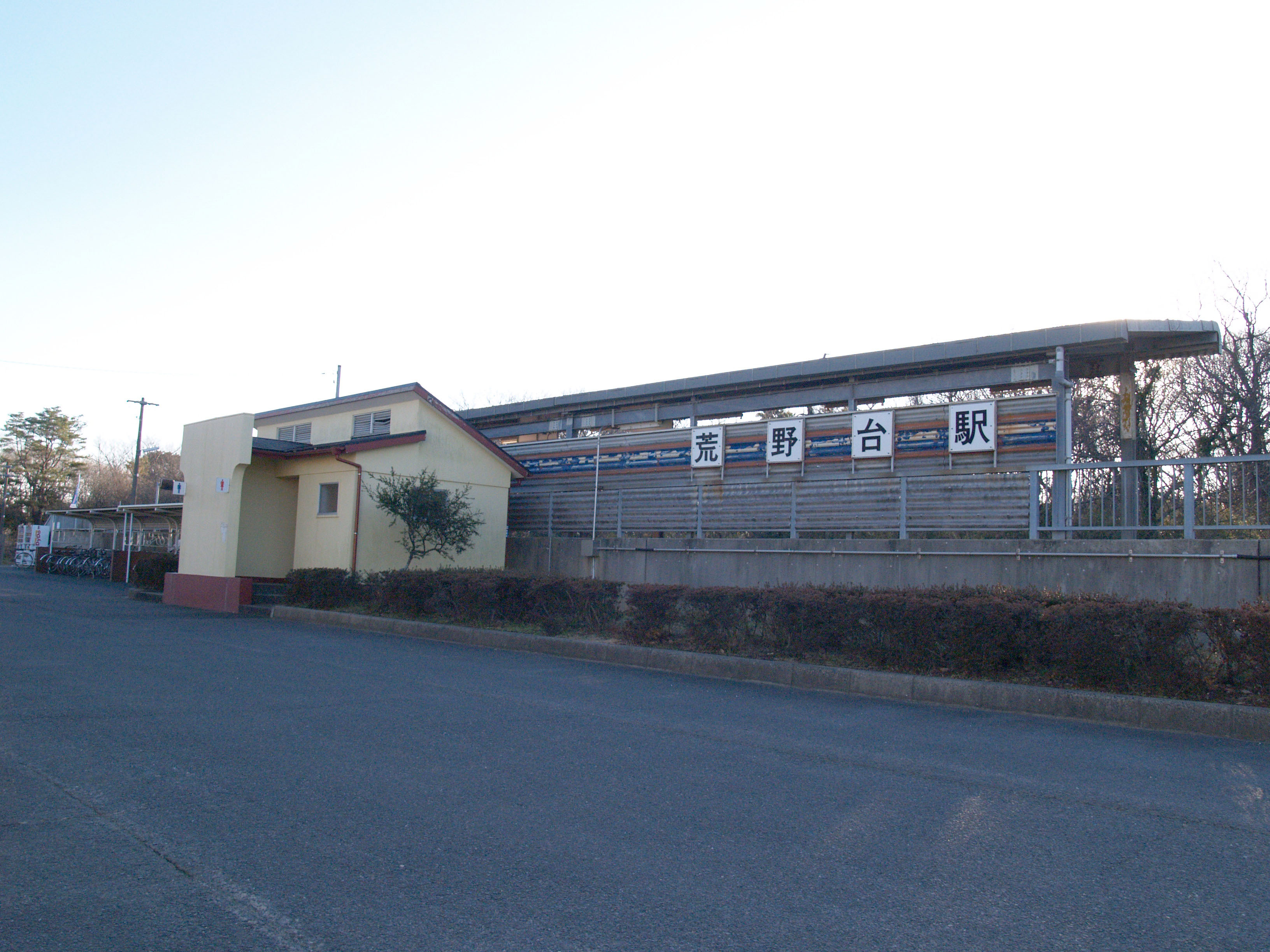
- View of Koyadai Station in January 2014

General information
- Location: Koya 1565-44, Kashima-shi, Ibaraki-ken 311-2221; Japan
- Coordinates: 36.0168°N 140.6253°E
- Operator: Kashima Rinkai Tetsudo
- Line: ■ Ōarai-Kashima Line
- Distance: 50.0 km from Mito
- Platforms: 1 (1 side platform)
- Connections: Bus terminal

Construction
- Structure type: At-grade

Other information
- Status: Unstaffed
- Website: Official website

History
- Opened: 14 March 1985

Passengers
- FY2015: 166 daily

Services
Preceding station	Kashima Rinkai Railway	Following station
Chōjagahamashiosaihamanasukōenmae towards Mito	Ōarai Kashima Line	Kashimajingū Terminus
Chōjagahamashiosaihamanasukōenmae towards Mito	Ōarai Kashima Line	Kashima Soccer Stadium (Match days only) towards Kashimajingū
Location
- Location within Ibaraki Prefecture Location within Japan

Kōyadai Station (荒野台駅, Kōyadai-eki) is a passenger railway station in the town of Kashima, Ibaraki Prefecture, Japan operated by the third sector Kashima Rinkai Railway.

== Lines ==
Kōyadai Station is served by the Kashima Rinkai Railway’s Ōarai Kashima Line, and is located 50.1 km from the official starting point of the line at Mito Station.

== Station layout ==
The station consists of one elevated side platform, serving traffic in both directions, with the station building underneath to one side. The station is unattended.

== History ==
Kōyadai Station was opened on 14 March 1985 with the opening of the Ōarai Kashima Line.

== Passenger statistics ==
In fiscal 2015, the station was used by an average of 166 passengers daily.

== Surrounding area ==
- National Route 51
- Nakano Post Office

== See also ==
- List of railway stations in Japan
