= Hokota =

Hokota 鉾田市
- City
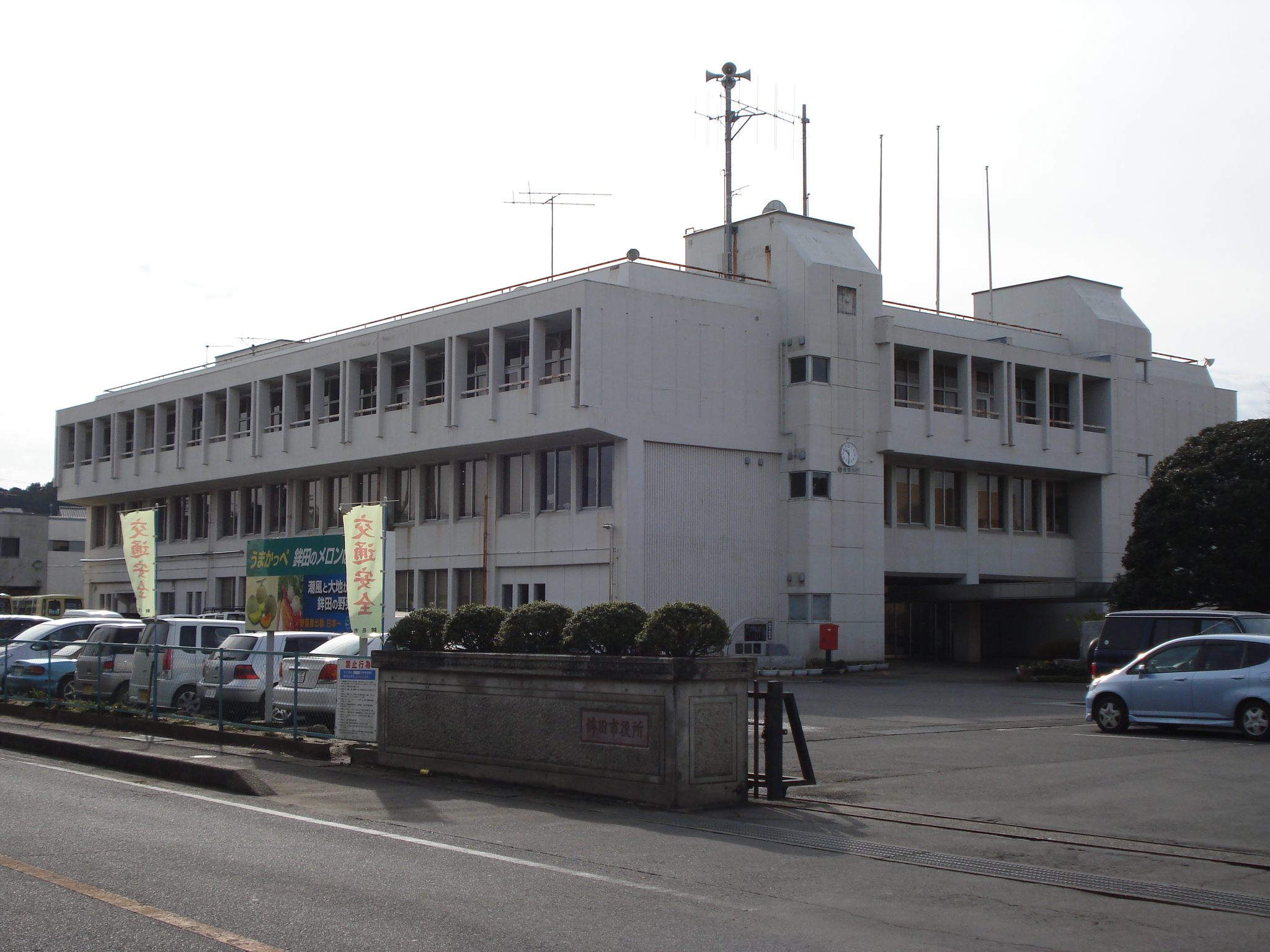
- Hokota city hall

- Flag Seal

- Location of Hokota in Ibaraki Prefecture

- Coordinates: 36°9′31.2″N 140°30′59.1″E
- Country: Japan
- Region: Kantō
- Prefecture: Ibaraki

Area
  - Total: 207.61 km^{2} (80.16 sq mi)

Population (October 2020)
  - Total: 45,886
  - Density: 221.02/km^{2} (572.44/sq mi)
- Time zone: UTC+9 (Japan Standard Time)
- Phone number: 0291-33-2111
- Address: 1444-1 Hokota, Hokota-shi, Ibaraki-ken 311-1592
- Climate: Cfa
- Website: Official website
- Symbols
- Bird: Japanese bush warbler
- Flower: Sunflower
- Tree: Sakura

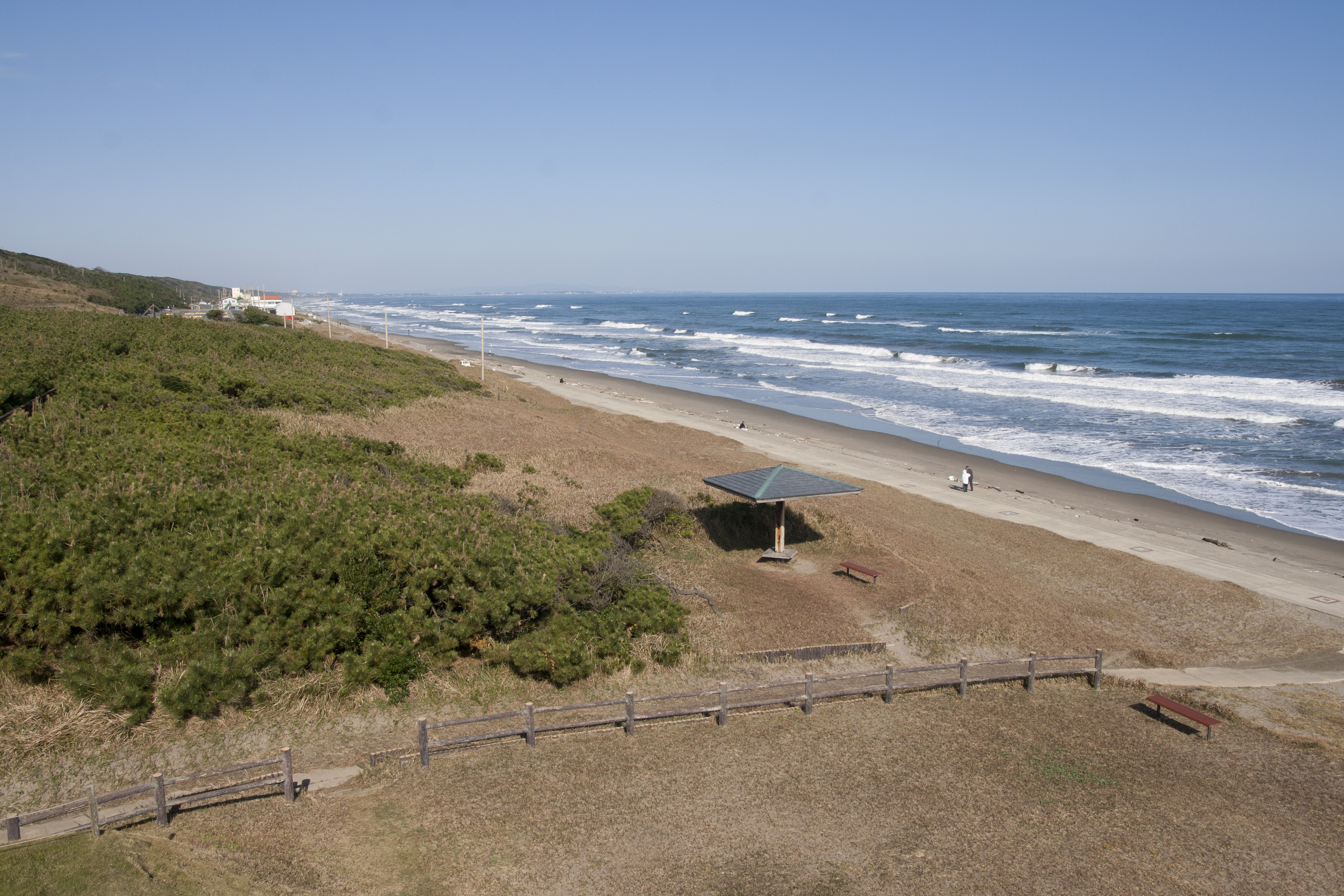
Kashimana Kaihin Koen

Hokota (鉾田市, Hokota-shi) is a city located in Ibaraki Prefecture, Japan. As of 1 July 2020, the city had an estimated population of 45,997 in 18,455 households and a population density of 221.6 persons per km^{2}. The percentage of the population aged over 65 was 34.1%. The total area of the city is 207.60 square kilometres (80.15 sq mi).

== Geography ==
Hokota is located in central Ibaraki Prefecture, approximately 90 kilometers northeast of Tokyo and within 30 kilometers of Mito City, the prefectural capital. The eastern side of the city faces the Pacific Ocean and has a long shallow coastline from north to south. Most of the inland area is flat, and agriculture that takes advantage of the flat terrain and the mild climate is the core industry.

=== Surrounding municipalities ===
Ibaraki Prefecture

- Kashima
- Namegata
- Ōarai
- Omitama

=== Climate ===
Hokota has a humid subtropical climate (Köppen Cfa) characterized by warm summers and cold winters with light snowfall. The average annual temperature in Hokota is 13.8 °C (56.8 °F). The average annual rainfall is 1,468.5 mm (57.81 in) with October as the wettest month. The temperatures are highest on average in August, at around 25.3 °C (77.5 °F), and lowest in January, at around 2.8 °C (37.0 °F).

Climate data for Hokota (1991−2020 normals, extremes 1978−present)
Month	Jan	Feb	Mar	Apr	May	Jun	Jul	Aug	Sep	Oct	Nov	Dec	Year
Record high °C (°F)	17.9 (64.2)	24.2 (75.6)	25.1 (77.2)	29.4 (84.9)	33.7 (92.7)	37.5 (99.5)	37.8 (100.0)	37.8 (100.0)	36.7 (98.1)	32.5 (90.5)	25.7 (78.3)	24.1 (75.4)	37.8 (100.0)
Mean daily maximum °C (°F)	9.2 (48.6)	9.6 (49.3)	12.7 (54.9)	17.6 (63.7)	21.8 (71.2)	24.3 (75.7)	28.5 (83.3)	30.0 (86.0)	26.3 (79.3)	21.2 (70.2)	16.4 (61.5)	11.5 (52.7)	19.1 (66.4)
Daily mean °C (°F)	2.8 (37.0)	3.7 (38.7)	7.1 (44.8)	12.0 (53.6)	16.6 (61.9)	19.9 (67.8)	23.8 (74.8)	25.3 (77.5)	21.9 (71.4)	16.4 (61.5)	10.6 (51.1)	5.1 (41.2)	13.8 (56.8)
Mean daily minimum °C (°F)	−3.0 (26.6)	−2.2 (28.0)	1.1 (34.0)	6.2 (43.2)	11.7 (53.1)	16.2 (61.2)	20.3 (68.5)	21.8 (71.2)	18.3 (64.9)	11.9 (53.4)	5.1 (41.2)	−0.5 (31.1)	8.9 (48.0)
Record low °C (°F)	−10.6 (12.9)	−9.7 (14.5)	−7.2 (19.0)	−4.4 (24.1)	−0.5 (31.1)	7.3 (45.1)	11.9 (53.4)	12.6 (54.7)	5.2 (41.4)	−1.0 (30.2)	−5.3 (22.5)	−9.1 (15.6)	−10.6 (12.9)
Average precipitation mm (inches)	66.5 (2.62)	62.9 (2.48)	115.0 (4.53)	122.5 (4.82)	136.5 (5.37)	141.9 (5.59)	139.3 (5.48)	101.8 (4.01)	195.0 (7.68)	230.7 (9.08)	98.2 (3.87)	58.3 (2.30)	1,468.5 (57.81)
Average precipitation days (≥ 1.0 mm)	5.8	6.1	9.9	10.8	10.9	11.8	11.2	7.9	10.8	11.0	7.9	5.9	110
Mean monthly sunshine hours	181.4	170.2	181.3	185.7	184.9	137.1	154.4	193.2	145.2	139.1	146.6	161.8	1,980.8
Source: Japan Meteorological Agency

== Demographics ==
Per Japanese census data, the population of Hokota has remained relatively steady over the past 70 years.

Historical population
Year	Pop.	±%
1950	51,684	—
1960	50,616	−2.1%
1970	45,119	−10.9%
1980	47,731	+5.8%
1990	50,123	+5.0%
2000	50,915	+1.6%
2010	50,156	−1.5%
2020	45,953	−8.4%

== History ==
The town of Hokota was created with the establishment of the modern municipalities system on April 1, 1889. The city of Hokota was established on October 11, 2005, from the merger of the former town of Hokota, and the villages of Asahi and Taiyō (all from Kashima District).

== Government ==
Hokota has a mayor-council form of government with a directly elected mayor and a unicameral city council of 18 members. Hokota, together with neighboring Ōarai and Ibaraki, contributes two members to the Ibaraki Prefectural Assembly. In terms of national politics, the city is part of Ibaraki 2nd district of the lower house of the Diet of Japan.

== Economy ==
The economy of Hokota is primarily agricultural, with melons as a major cash crop.

== Education ==
- Hokota has ten public elementary schools and five public middle schools operated by the city government, and two public high schools operated by the Ibaraki Prefectural Board of Education.

== Transportation ==
=== Railway ===
- Kashima Rinkai Railway – Ōarai Kashima Line

- Hinuma - Kashima-Asahi - Tokushuku - Shin-Hokota - Kitaurakohan - Taiyō

=== Highway ===
- National Route 51
- National Route 124
- National Route 354

== Local attractions ==
- Kashima Littoral Park
- Otake Beach

== Notable people from Hokota ==
- Tetsuya Asano, soccer player
