= Kashima-Ōno Station =

Railway station in Kashima, Ibaraki Prefecture, Japan

Kashima-Ōno Station 鹿島大野駅
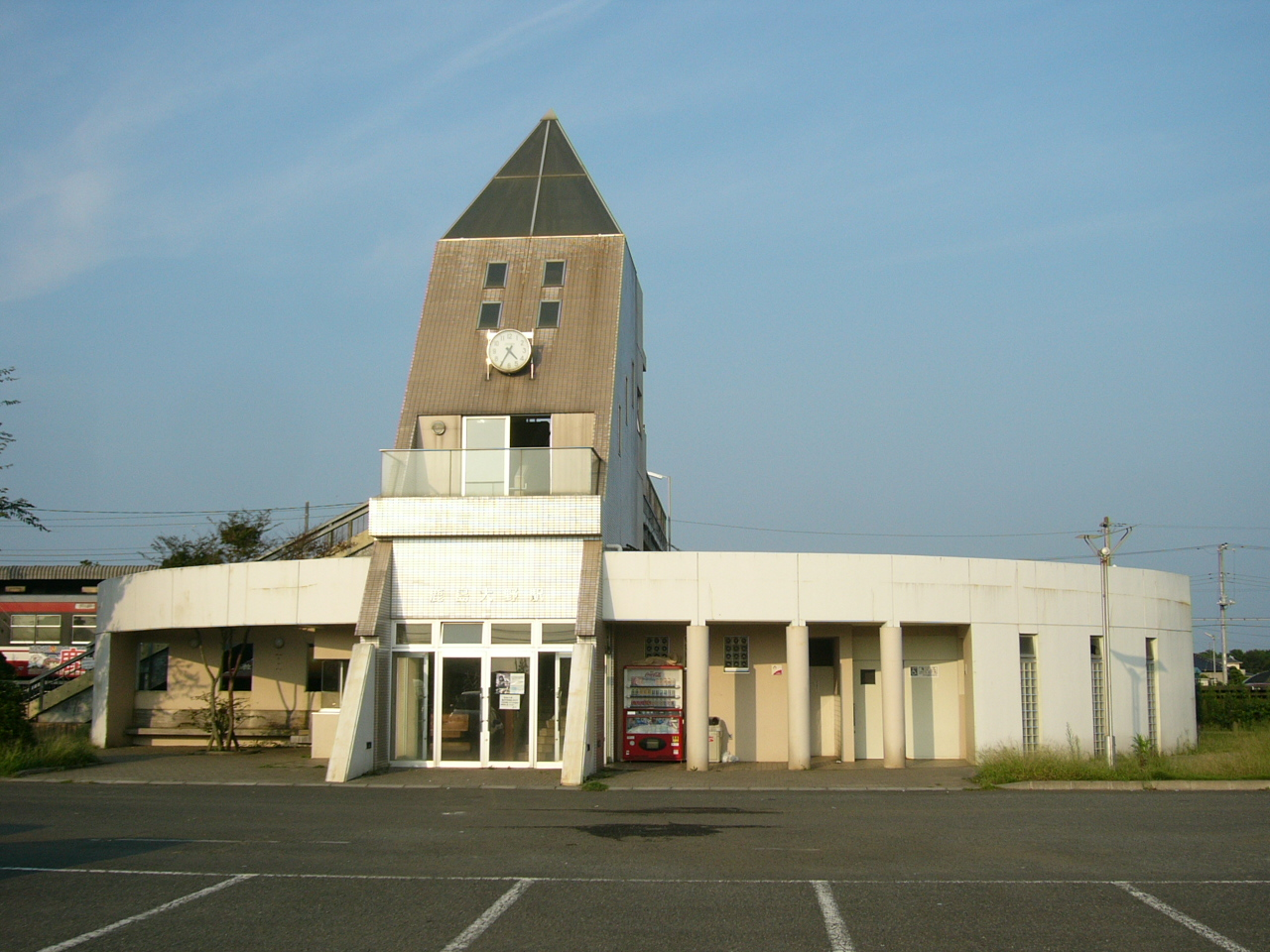
- Kashima-Ōno Station, September 2005

General information
- Location: Arai 561-3, Kashima-shi, Ibaraki-ken 311-2204; Japan
- Coordinates: 36.0504°N 140.6100°E
- Operator: Kashima Rinkai Tetsudo
- Line: ■ Ōarai-Kashima Line
- Distance: 46.1 km from Mito
- Platforms: 2 (1 island platform)
- Connections: Bus terminal

Construction
- Structure type: At-grade

Other information
- Status: Unstaffed
- Website: Official website

History
- Opened: 14 March 1985

Passengers
- FY2015: 277 daily

Services
Preceding station	Kashima Rinkai Railway	Following station
Kashimanada towards Mito	Ōarai Kashima Line	Chōjagahamashiosaihamanasukōenmae towards Kashimajingū
Location
- Location within Ibaraki Prefecture Location within Japan

Kashima-Ōno Station (鹿島大野駅, Kashima-Ōno-eki) is a passenger railway station in the town of Kashima, Ibaraki Prefecture, Japan operated by the third sector Kashima Rinkai Railway.

== Lines ==
Kashima-Ōno Station is served by the Ōarai Kashima Line, and is located 46.1 km from the official starting point of the line at Mito Station.

== Station layout ==
The station consists of a single island platform, connected to the circular station building by a footbridge. The station is unattended.

=== Platforms ===
1	■ Ōarai Kashima Line	for Kashimajingū
2	■ Ōarai Kashima Line	for Ōarai and Mito

== History ==
Kashima-Ōno Station was opened on 14 March 1985 with the opening of the Ōarai Kashima Line.

== Passenger statistics ==
In fiscal 2015, the station was used by an average of 277 passengers daily.

== Surrounding area ==
- National Route 51
- Arai Post Office
- former Ōno Village Hall

== See also ==
- List of railway stations in Japan
