= Higashi-Mito Station =

Railway station in Mito, Ibaraki Prefecture, Japan

Higashi-Mito Station 東水戸駅
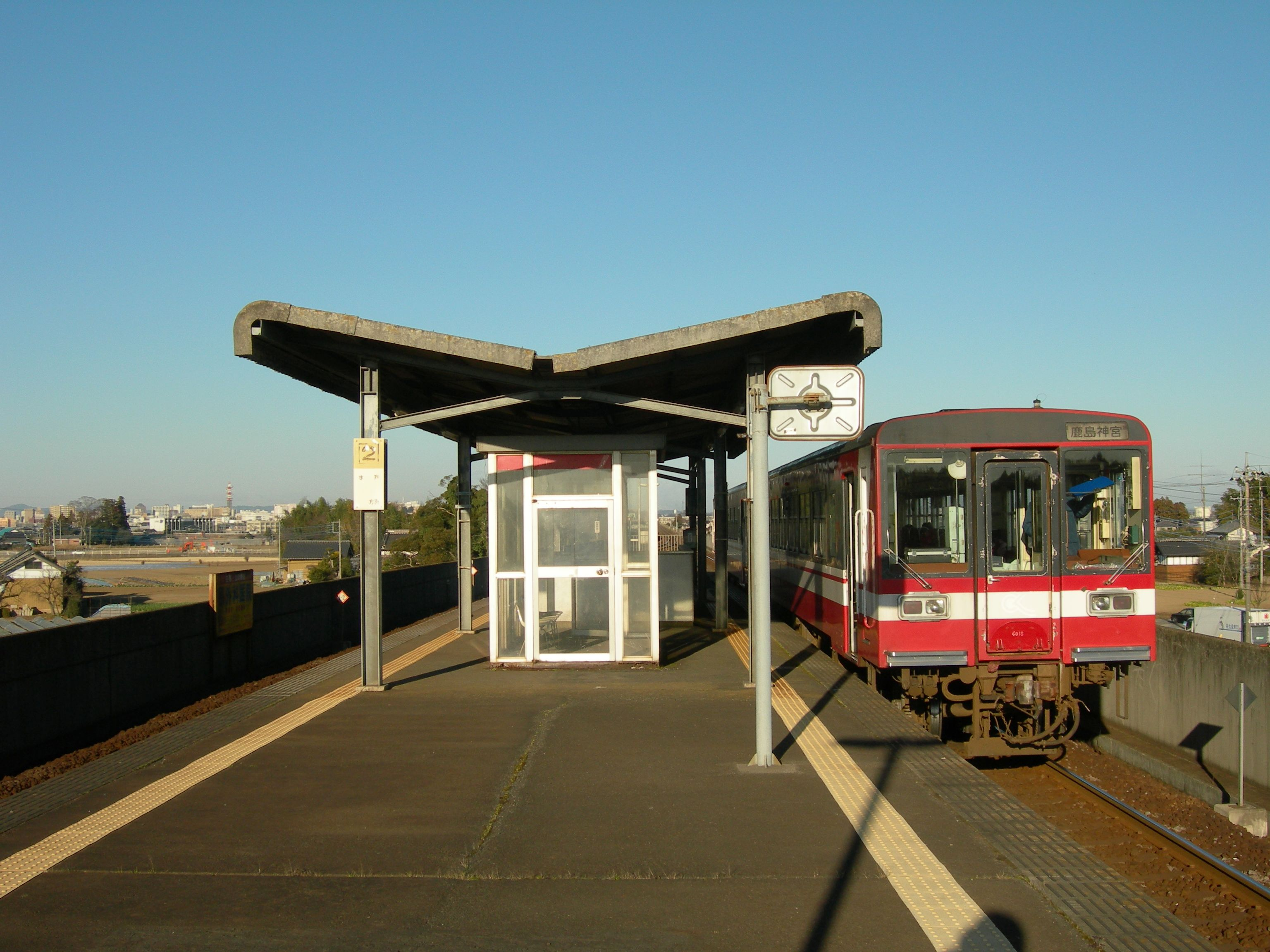
- Higashi-Mito Station, January 2011

General information
- Location: Yoshinuma-cho 1426-3, Mito, Ibaraki-ken 310-0827; Japan
- Coordinates: 36.3618°N 140.5163°E
- Operator: Kashima Rinkai Tetsudo
- Line: ■ Ōarai-Kashima Line
- Platforms: 2 (1 island platform)
- Connections: Bus terminal

Construction
- Structure type: Elevated

Other information
- Status: Unstaffed
- Website: Official website

History
- Opened: 14 March 1985

Passengers
- FY2018: 144 daily

Services
| Preceding station | Kashima Rinkai Railway | Following station |
|---|---|---|
| Mito Terminus | Ōarai Kashima Line | Tsunezumi towards Kashimajingū |
Location
- Location within Ibaraki Prefecture Location within Japan

Higashi-Mito Station (東水戸駅, Higashi-Mito-eki) is a passenger railway station in the city of Mito, Ibaraki Prefecture, Japan operated by the third sector Kashima Rinkai Railway.

== Lines ==
Higashi-Mito Station is served by the Ōarai Kashima Line, and is located 3.8 km from the official starting point of the line at Mito Station.

== Station layout ==
The station consists of a single elevated island platform. The station is unattended.

=== Platforms ===
| 1 | ■ Ōarai Kashima Line | for Kashimajingū |
| 2 | ■ Ōarai Kashima Line | for Mito |

== History ==
Higashi-Mito Station was opened on 14 March 1985 with the opening of the Ōarai Kashima Line.

== Passenger statistics ==
In fiscal 2018, the station was used by an average of 144 passengers daily.

== Surrounding area ==
- Mito Kamiono Elementary School

== See also ==
- List of railway stations in Japan
