= Hinuma Station =

Railway station in Hokota, Ibaraki Prefecture, Japan

Hinuma Station 涸沼駅
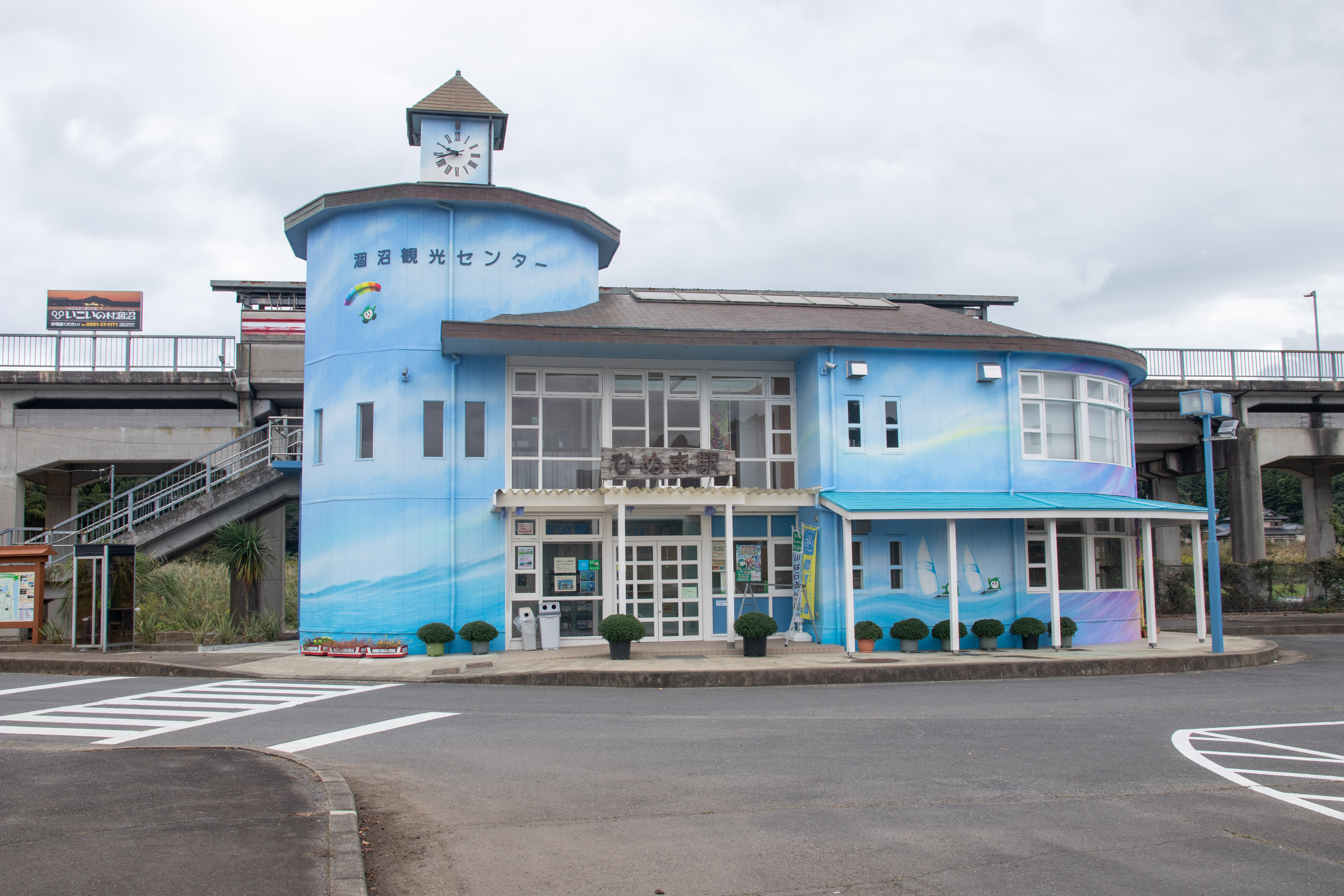
- Hinuma Station, October 2018

General information
- Location: Shimo-Ota 866-2, Hokota-shi, Ibaraki-ken 311-1402; Japan
- Coordinates: 36.2661°N 140.5272°E
- Operator: Kashima Rinkai Tetsudo
- Line: ■ Ōarai-Kashima Line
- Distance: 18.0 km from Mito
- Platforms: 1 (1 side platform)
- Connections: Bus terminal

Construction
- Structure type: Elevated

Other information
- Status: Staffed
- Website: Official website

History
- Opened: 14 March 1985

Passengers
- FY2015: 256 daily

Services
Preceding station	Kashima Rinkai Railway	Following station
Ōarai towards Mito	Ōarai Kashima Line	Kashima-Asahi towards Kashimajingū
Location
- Location within Ibaraki Prefecture Location within Japan

Hinuma Station (涸沼駅, Hinuma-eki) is a passenger railway station in the town of Hokota, Ibaraki Prefecture, Japan operated by the third sector Kashima Rinkai Railway.

== Lines ==
Hinuma Station is served by the Ōarai Kashima Line, and is located 18.0 km from the official starting point of the line at Mito Station.

== Station layout ==
The station consists of a single elevated side platform serving traffic in both directions. The station is unattended.

== History ==
Hinuma Station was opened on 14 March 1985 with the opening of the Ōarai Kashima Line.

== Passenger statistics ==
In fiscal 2015, the station was used by an average of 256 passengers daily.

== Surrounding area ==
- Lake Hinuma

== See also ==
- List of railway stations in Japan
