= Ōarai =

Ōarai 大洗町
- Town
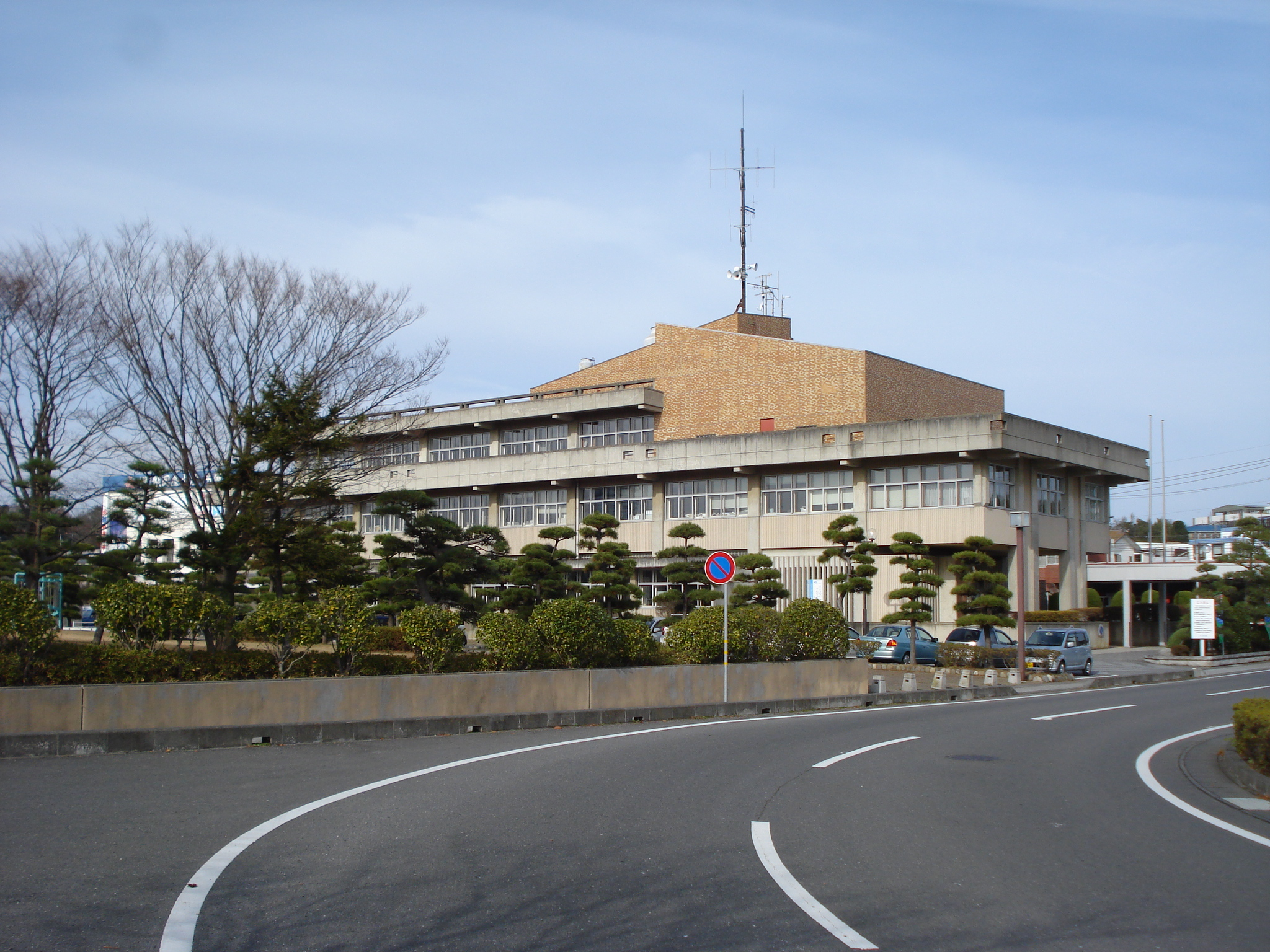
- Ōarai town hall

- Flag Seal

- Location of Ōarai in Ibaraki Prefecture

- Coordinates: 36°18′48″N 140°34′29.5″E
- Country: Japan
- Region: Kantō
- Prefecture: Ibaraki
- District: Higashiibaraki

Area
  - Total: 23.74 km^{2} (9.17 sq mi)

Population (1 October 2020)
  - Total: 15,787
  - Density: 665.0/km^{2} (1,722/sq mi)
- Time zone: UTC+9 (Japan Standard Time)
  - Tree: Pine
  - Flower: Azalea
  - Bird: Common gull
- Phone number: 029-288-3111
- Address: 6881-275 Isohama-cho, Ōarai-machi, Higashiibaraki-gun, Ibaraki-ken 311–1392
- Website: Official website

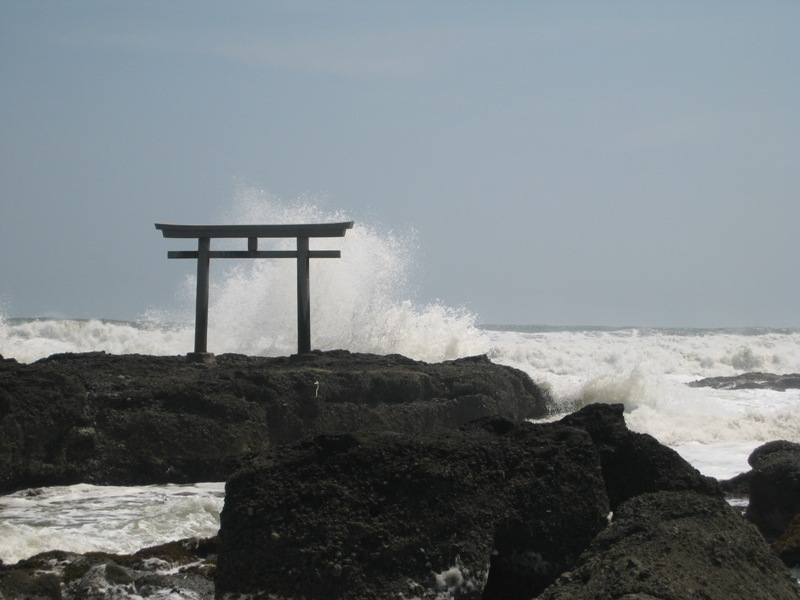
Ōarai coast

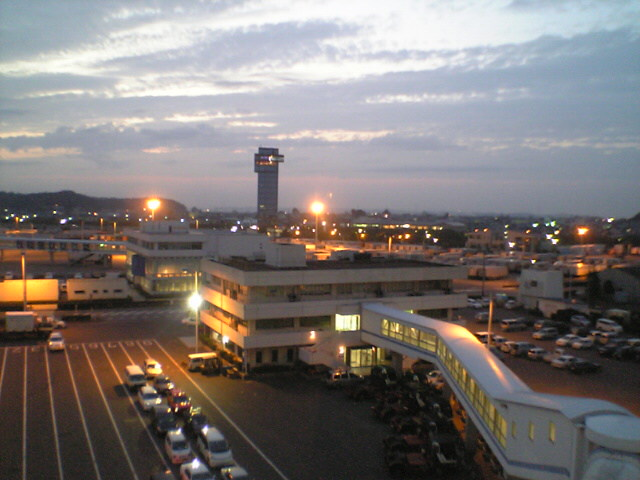
Ōarai port

Ōarai (大洗町, Ōarai-machi) is a town located in Ibaraki Prefecture, Japan. As of 1 July 2020, the town had an estimated population of 15,867 in 6,881 households and a population density of 664 inhabitants per square kilometre (1,720/sq mi). The percentage of the population aged over 65 was 34.0%. The total area of the town is 23.89 square kilometres (9.22 sq mi). The Japan Atomic Energy Agency operates a research center in Ōarai with a number of nuclear research reactors, including the Jōyō and High-temperature engineering test reactor facilities.

== Geography ==
Located on the coast of central Ibaraki Prefecture, Ōarai is located in the flatlands near the Pacific Ocean, and borders Lake Hinuma, the 30th largest body of freshwater in Japan. The Naka River flows through the town. Ōarai and Sun Beach bathing beaches were first to introduce barrier-free bathing beaches for the disabled in Japan.

=== Surrounding municipalities ===
Ibaraki Prefecture

- Hitachinaka
- Hokota
- Ibaraki
- Mito

=== Climate ===
Ōarai has a Humid continental climate (Köppen Cfa) characterized by warm summers and cold winters with light snowfall. The average annual temperature in Ōarai is 14.0 °C (57.2 °F). The average annual rainfall is 1,416 millimetres (55.7 in) with September as the wettest month. The temperatures are highest on average in August, at around 25.4 °C (77.7 °F), and lowest in January, at around 3.6 °C (38.5 °F).

== Demographics ==
Per Japanese census data, the population of Ōarai has declined steadily over the past 70 years.

Historical population
Year	Pop.	±%
1950	23,193	—
1960	22,290	−3.9%
1970	21,654	−2.9%
1980	21,244	−1.9%
1990	20,745	−2.3%
2000	19,957	−3.8%
2010	18,328	−8.2%
2020	15,715	−14.3%

== History ==
The villages of Isohama and Ōnuki within Higashiibaraki District and the village of Natsumi within Kashima District were created with the establishment of the modern municipalities system on April 1, 1889. Ōnuki was elevated to town status on January 26, 1894. Ōnuki and Isohama merged on November 3, 1954, to create the town of Ōarai. A portion of Natsumi was annexed by Ōarai on July 23, 1955.

In 1928, Nisshō Inoue, the founder of the far-right militant organization Ketsumeidan (血盟団, League of Blood), relocated to Ōarai, where he established Risshō Gokokudō (立正護国堂, Righteous National Defense Temple), which served as a youth training center advocating a militarist revolution in Japan, eventually resulting in the 1932 League of Blood Incident.

Since 1998 the chief of a factory association in Oarai has invited Japanese descendants and migrants from North Sulawesi, Indonesia, to work for seafood industries. A majority of the Indonesian inhabitants were later arrested for being undocumented.

== Government ==
Ōarai has a mayor-council form of government with a directly elected mayor and a unicameral town council of 12 members. Ōarai, together with neighboring Hokota and Ibaraki, contributes two members to the Ibaraki Prefectural Assembly. In terms of national politics, the town is part of Ibaraki 2nd district of the lower house of the Diet of Japan.

== Economy ==
The nuclear industry and government largess form the basis of the local economy. Main agricultural products include rice, sweet potatoes and Japanese radish. The commercial fishing industry is important, and main fishery products include whitebait, sardines, flounder and clams. Marine food processing includes salted and dried horse mackerel, smelt and sardines and boiled octopus.

== Education ==
- Ōarai has two public elementary schools and two public middle schools operated by the town government, and one public high school operated by the Ibaraki Prefectural Board of Education.

== Transportation ==
=== Railway ===
– Kashima Rinkai Railway Ōarai Kashima Line

- Ōarai Station

=== Highway ===
- National Route 51

=== Seaport ===
- Port of Ōarai (A MOL Ferry operates two ferries to Tomakomai, Hokkaidō daily)

== Local attractions ==
Ōarai attracts 3 million visitors a year. Tourist attractions include bathing beaches, yacht and cruiser marina, marine sports, camping site, fishing, aquarium, and a famous golf course. It is known for its monkfish.

- Aqua World (formerly Ōarai Aquarium)
- "Kurumazuka-kofun" and "Kagamizuka-kofun"
- Ōarai Beach
- Oarai Isosaki Shrine
- Ōarai Marine Tower
- Ōarai Sea Museum
- Ōarai Museum of Art
- Ōarai Museum of Bakumatsu-Meiji History

== Noted people from Ōarai ==
- Kei Igawa. professional baseball player
- Hiromoto Okubo. professional baseball player
- Akua Shōma. professional sumo wrestler

== Anglerfish Festival ==
The Ōarai Anglerfish Festival is held yearly, since 1998, and features a range of traditional activities.

== In popular culture ==
The city has become an anime pilgrimage location due to being the setting for the popular franchise Girls und Panzer. The main characters of the animated series study in a huge ship originally based in Ōarai. Real locations in the city are depicted faithfully, prompting fans to visit the town and giving a boost to local commerce.
