= Tokushuku Station =

Railway station in Hokota, Ibaraki Prefecture, Japan

Tokushuku Station 徳宿駅
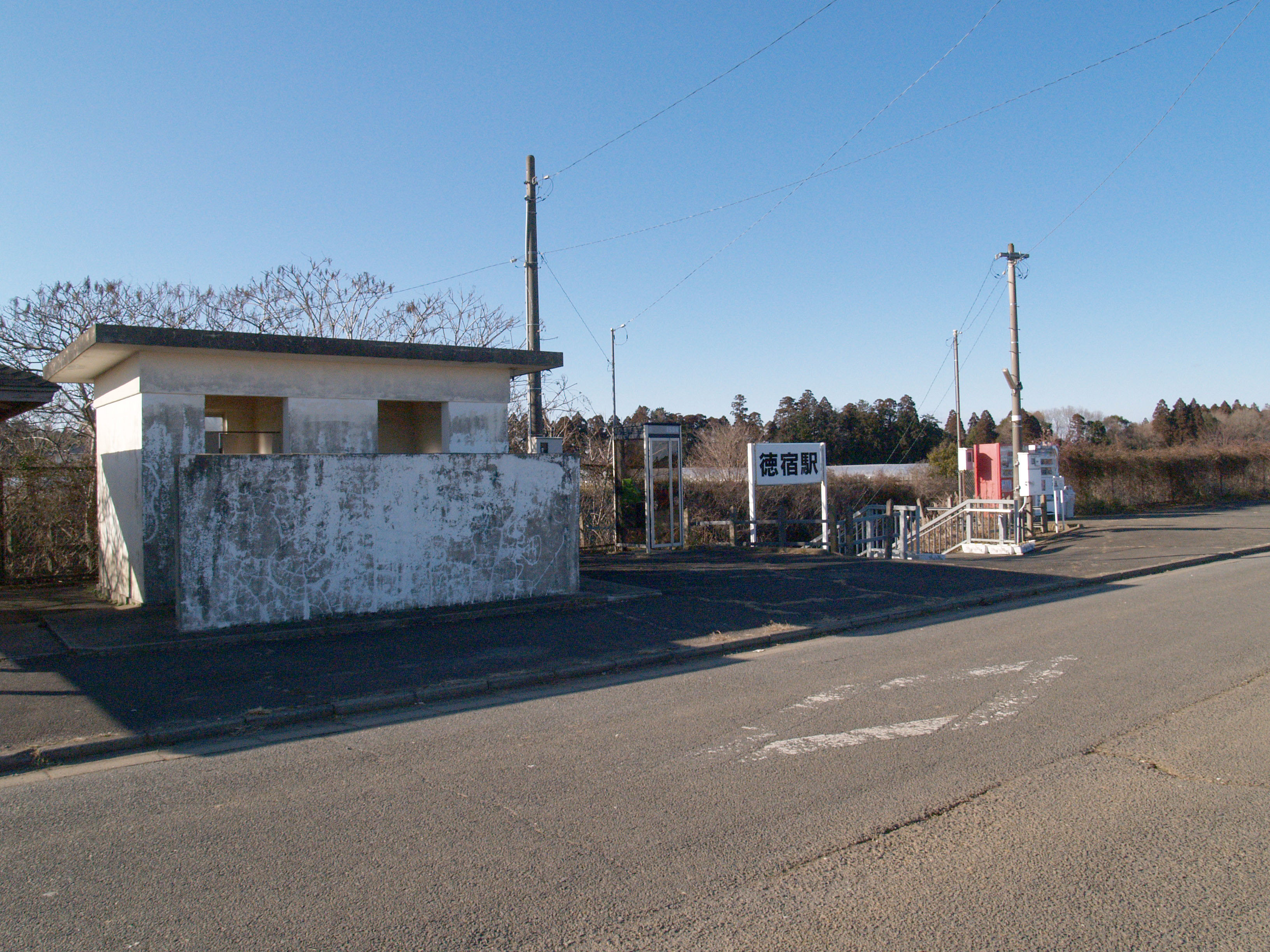
- Tokushuku Station, January 2014

General information
- Location: Tokushuku 795-3, Hokota-shi, Ibaraki-ken 311-1503; Japan
- Coordinates: 36.1902°N 140.5144°E
- Operator: Kashima Rinkai Tetsudo
- Line: ■ Ōarai-Kashima Line
- Distance: 26.7 km from Mito
- Platforms: 1 (1 side platform)
- Connections: Bus terminal

Construction
- Structure type: At-grade

Other information
- Status: Unstaffed
- Website: Official website

History
- Opened: 14 March 1985

Passengers
- FY2015: 71 daily

Services
Preceding station	Kashima Rinkai Railway	Following station
Kashima-Asahi towards Mito	Ōarai Kashima Line	Shin-Hokota towards Kashimajingū
Location
- Location within Ibaraki Prefecture Location within Japan

Tokushuku Station (徳宿駅, Tokushuku-eki) is a passenger railway station in the town of Hokota, Ibaraki Prefecture, Japan operated by the third sector Kashima Rinkai Railway.

== Lines ==
Tokushuku Station is served by the Kashima Rinkai Railway’s Ōarai Kashima Line, and is located 26.7 km from the official starting point of the line at Mito Station.

== Station layout ==
The station consists of a single side platform serving traffic in both directions. There is no station building, but only a waiting shelter, and the station is unattended.

== History ==
Tokushuku Station was opened on 14 March 1985 with the opening of the Ōarai Kashima Line.

== Passenger statistics ==
In fiscal 2015, the station was used by an average of 71 passengers daily.

== Surrounding area ==
- Tokushuku Post Office

== See also ==
- List of railway stations in Japan
