= Kashima-Asahi Station =

Railway station in Hokota, Ibaraki Prefecture, Japan

Kashima-Asahi Station 鹿島旭駅
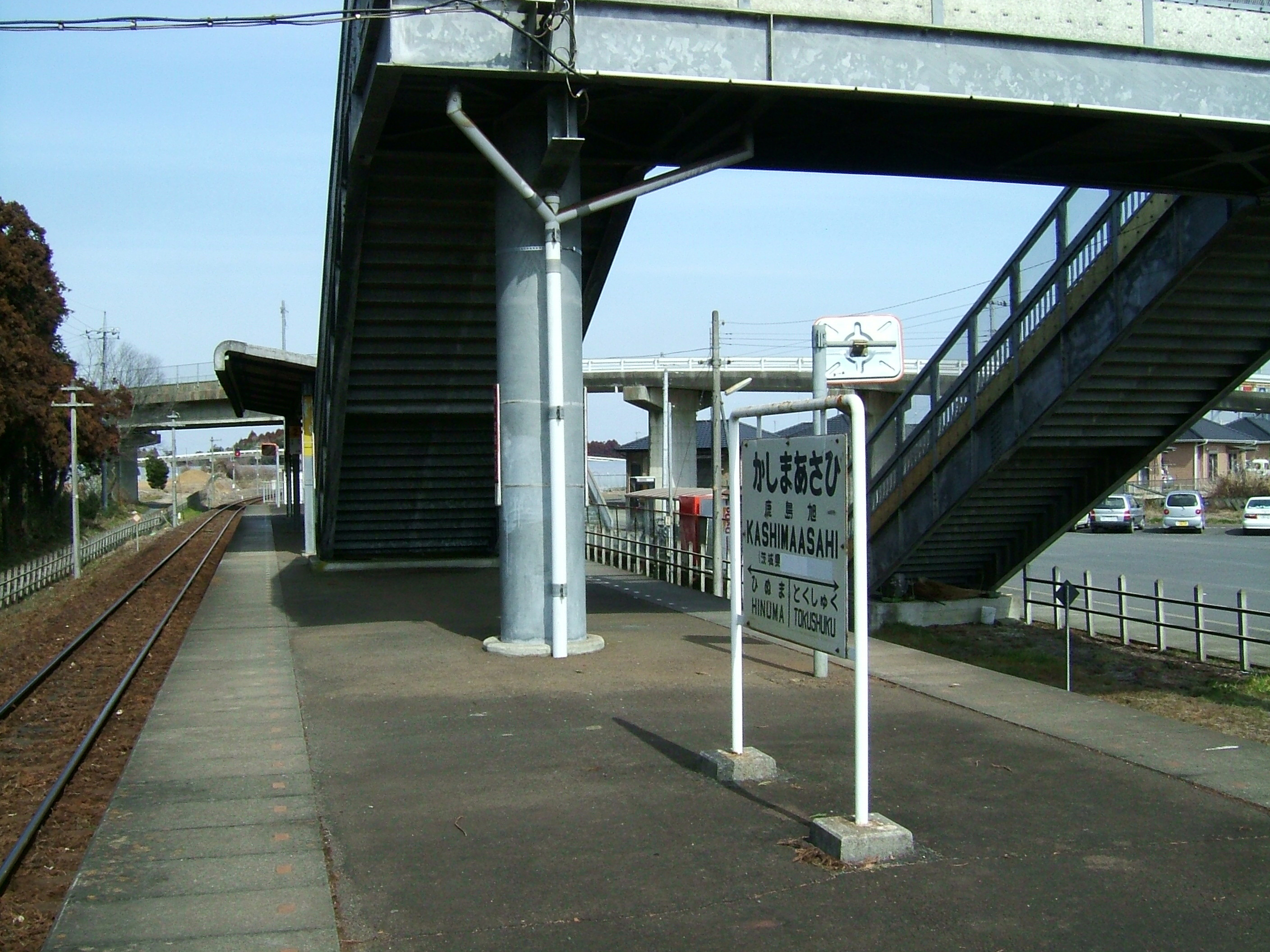
- Kashima-Asahi Station, March 2008

General information
- Location: Tsukuriya 1375-103, Hokota-shi, Ibaraki-ken 311-1415; Japan
- Coordinates: 36.2246°N 140.5126°E
- Operator: Kashima Rinkai Tetsudo
- Line: ■ Ōarai-Kashima Line
- Distance: 22.8 km from Mito
- Platforms: 2 (1 island platform)
- Connections: Bus terminal

Construction
- Structure type: At-grade

Other information
- Status: Unstaffed
- Website: Official website

History
- Opened: 14 March 1985

Passengers
- FY2015: 344 daily

Services
Preceding station	Kashima Rinkai Railway	Following station
Hinuma towards Mito	Ōarai Kashima Line	Tokushuku towards Kashimajingū
Location
- Location within Ibaraki Prefecture Location within Japan

Kashima-Asahi Station (鹿島旭駅, Kashima-Asahi-ekii) is a passenger railway station in the town of Hokota, Ibaraki Prefecture, Japan operated by the third sector Kashima Rinkai Railway.

== Lines ==
Kashima-Asahi Station is served by the Kashima Rinkai Railway’s Ōarai Kashima Line, and is located 22.8 km from the official starting point of the line at Mito Station.

== Station layout ==
The station consists of a single island platform connected to the station building by a footbridge. The station is unattended.

=== Platforms ===
1	■ Ōarai Kashima Line	for Kashimajingū
2	■ Ōarai Kashima Line	for Ōarai and Mito

== History ==
Kashima-Asahi Station was opened on 14 March 1985 with the opening of the Ōarai Kashima Line.

== Passenger statistics ==
In fiscal 2015, the station was used by an average of 344 passengers daily.

== Surrounding area ==
- former Asahi Village Hall

== See also ==
- List of railway stations in Japan
