= Kitaurakohan Station =

Railway station in Hokota, Ibaraki Prefecture, Japan

Kitaurakohan Station 北浦湖畔駅
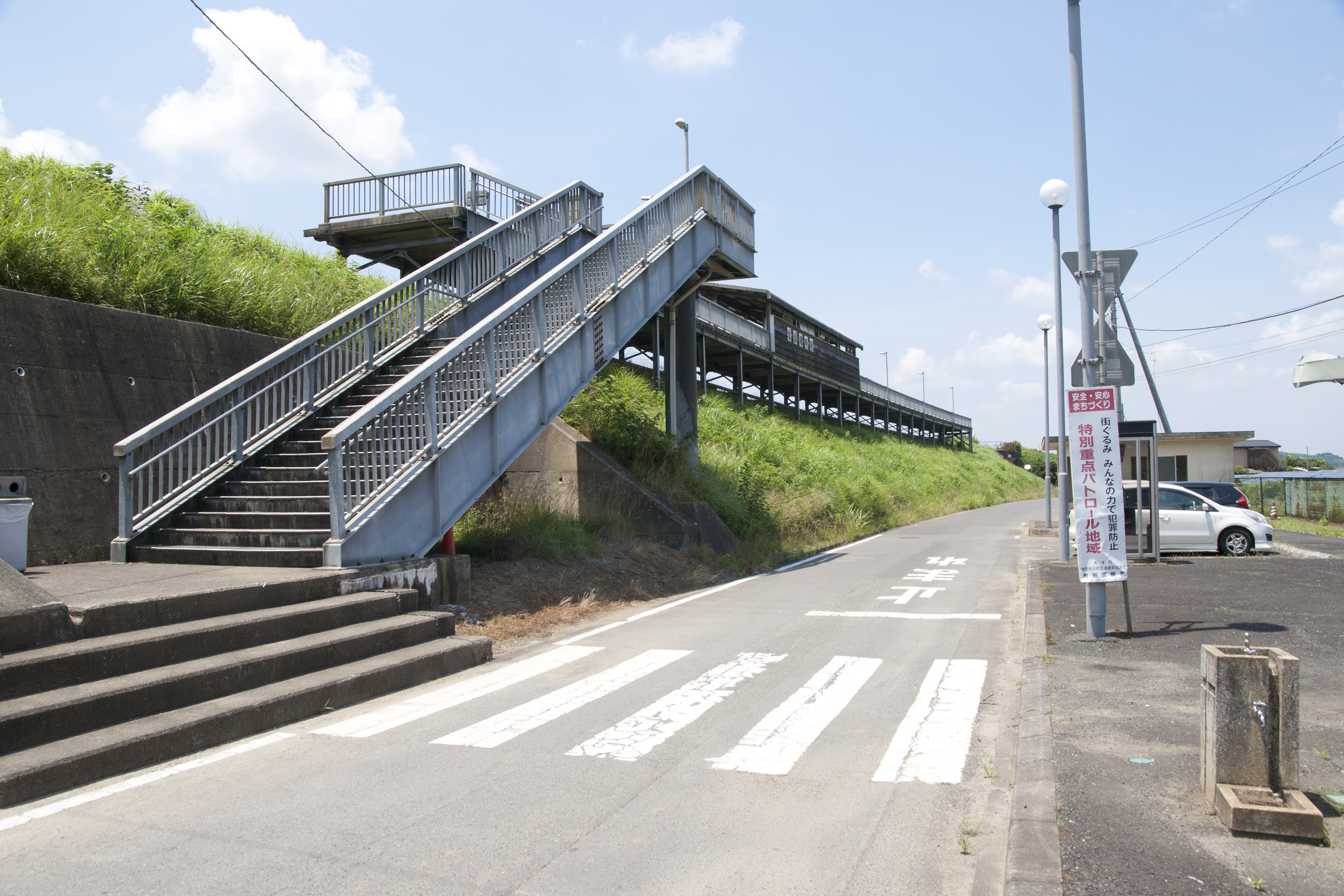
- Kitaurakohan Station entrance in July 2017

General information
- Location: Kajimayama 1423-3, Hokota-shi, Ibaraki-ken 311-2104; Japan
- Coordinates: 36.1206°N 140.5368°E
- Operator: Kashima Rinkai Tetsudo
- Line: ■ Ōarai-Kashima Line
- Distance: 34.9 km from Mito
- Platforms: 1 (1 side platform)
- Connections: Bus terminal

Construction
- Structure type: Elevated

Other information
- Status: Unstaffed
- Website: Official website

History
- Opened: 14 March 1985

Passengers
- FY2015: 42 daily

Services
Preceding station	Kashima Rinkai Railway	Following station
Shin-Hokota towards Mito	Ōarai Kashima Line	Taiyō towards Kashimajingū
Location
- Location within Ibaraki Prefecture Location within Japan

Kitaurakohan Station (北浦湖畔駅, Kitaurakohan-eki) is a passenger railway station in the town of Hokota, Ibaraki Prefecture, Japan operated by the third sector Kashima Rinkai Railway.

== Lines ==
Kitaurakohan Station is served by the Kashima Rinkai Railway’s Ōarai Kashima Line, and is located 34.9 km from the official starting point of the line at Mito Station.

== Station layout ==
The station consists of a single side platform built on an embankment. The platform serves traffic in both directions. There is no station building, and the station is unattended.

== History ==
Kitaurakohan Station was opened on 14 March 1985 with the opening of the Ōarai Kashima Line.

== Passenger statistics ==
In fiscal 2015, the station was used by an average of 42 passengers daily.

== Surrounding area ==
- Lake Kasumigaura
- Cabinet Satellite Intelligence Center

== See also ==
- List of railway stations in Japan
