= Kashima, Ibaraki =

Kashima 鹿嶋市
- City
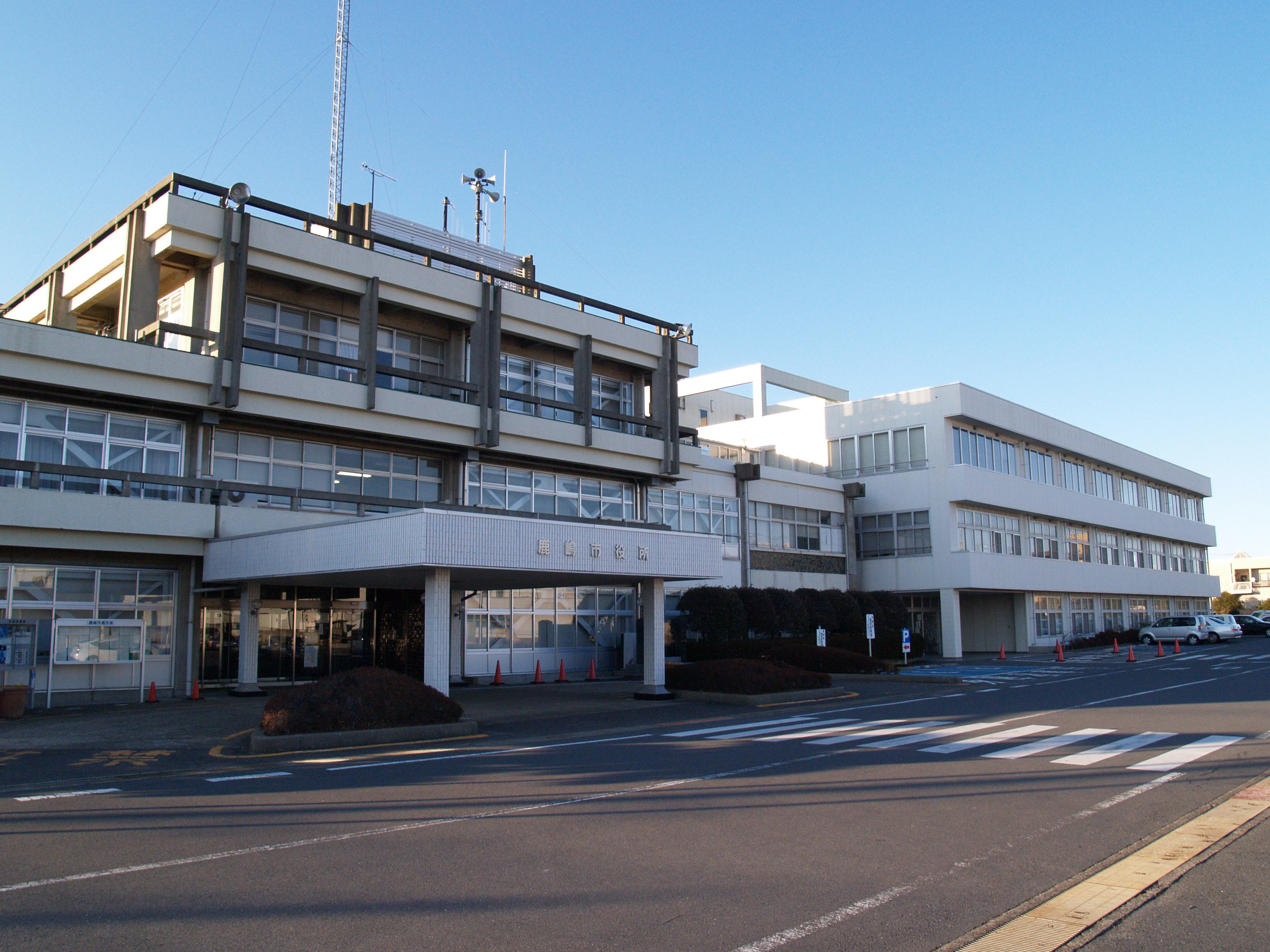
- Kashima city hall

- Flag Seal

- Location of Kashima in Ibaraki Prefecture

- Coordinates: 35°57′56.3″N 140°38′41.4″E
- Country: Japan
- Region: Kantō
- Prefecture: Ibaraki
- First official recorded: 660 BC
- Town settled: April 1, 1889
- City settled: September 1, 1995

Government
  - Mayor: Shinichi Taguchi (from April 2022)

Area
  - Total: 106.02 km^{2} (40.93 sq mi)

Population (July 2022)
  - Total: 66,098
  - Density: 623.45/km^{2} (1,614.7/sq mi)
- Time zone: UTC+9 (Japan Standard Time)
- Phone number: 0299-82-2911
- Address: 1187-1 Hirai, Kashima-shi, Ibaraki-ken 314-8655
- Climate: Cfa
- Website: Official website
- Symbols
- Bird: Green pheasant
- Flower: Rosa rugosa
- Tree: Pine

Kashima (鹿嶋市, Kashima-shi) is a city located in Ibaraki Prefecture, Japan. As of 1 July 2020, the city had an estimated population of 67,197 in 28,873 households and a population density of 634 persons per km^{2}. The percentage of the population aged over 65 was 31.5%. The total area of the city is 106.02 square kilometres (40.93 sq mi). Kashima is the home of the J. League's Kashima Antlers. Its home field, Kashima Soccer Stadium, was used as a site during the 2002 FIFA World Cup. The city is also the site of the Kashima Shrine, one of the oldest Shinto shrines in eastern Japan, and considered the birthplace of many influential styles of Japanese swordsmanship (Kenjutsu).

== Geography ==
Kashima is located in southeastern Ibaraki Prefecture, bordered by the Pacific Ocean to the east and Lake Kitaura (Lake Kasumigaura) to the west, with a width of less than 10 kilometers from east-to-west. It is approximately 110 kilometers to the northeast of Tokyo.

=== Surrounding municipalities ===
Ibaraki Prefecture

- Hokota
- Itako
- Kamisu
- Namegata

=== Climate ===
Kashima has a humid subtropical climate (Köppen Cfa) characterized by warm summers and cool winters with light snowfall. The average annual temperature in Kashima is 15.0 °C (59.0 °F). The average annual rainfall is 1,581.9 mm (62.28 in) with October as the wettest month. The temperatures are highest on average in August, at around 25.6 °C (78.1 °F), and lowest in January, at around 4.7 °C (40.5 °F).

Climate data for Kashima (1991−2020 normals, extremes 1978−present)
Month	Jan	Feb	Mar	Apr	May	Jun	Jul	Aug	Sep	Oct	Nov	Dec	Year
Record high °C (°F)	19.3 (66.7)	23.6 (74.5)	24.3 (75.7)	29.4 (84.9)	32.6 (90.7)	33.6 (92.5)	36.6 (97.9)	36.1 (97.0)	36.4 (97.5)	32.8 (91.0)	25.6 (78.1)	23.8 (74.8)	36.6 (97.9)
Mean daily maximum °C (°F)	9.4 (48.9)	9.9 (49.8)	12.8 (55.0)	17.5 (63.5)	21.7 (71.1)	24.2 (75.6)	28.3 (82.9)	29.9 (85.8)	26.3 (79.3)	21.3 (70.3)	16.6 (61.9)	11.8 (53.2)	19.1 (66.4)
Daily mean °C (°F)	4.7 (40.5)	5.4 (41.7)	8.5 (47.3)	13.1 (55.6)	17.3 (63.1)	20.3 (68.5)	24.1 (75.4)	25.6 (78.1)	22.7 (72.9)	17.9 (64.2)	12.5 (54.5)	7.2 (45.0)	14.9 (58.9)
Mean daily minimum °C (°F)	0.3 (32.5)	1.0 (33.8)	4.2 (39.6)	9.0 (48.2)	13.6 (56.5)	17.3 (63.1)	21.0 (69.8)	22.7 (72.9)	19.9 (67.8)	14.7 (58.5)	8.5 (47.3)	2.9 (37.2)	11.3 (52.3)
Record low °C (°F)	−5.8 (21.6)	−6.0 (21.2)	−3.7 (25.3)	−0.7 (30.7)	5.1 (41.2)	9.8 (49.6)	13.8 (56.8)	15.8 (60.4)	10.5 (50.9)	4.7 (40.5)	0.7 (33.3)	−3.8 (25.2)	−6.0 (21.2)
Average precipitation mm (inches)	88.2 (3.47)	72.1 (2.84)	129.8 (5.11)	123.3 (4.85)	132.7 (5.22)	145.4 (5.72)	134.8 (5.31)	102.3 (4.03)	210.9 (8.30)	273.7 (10.78)	105.8 (4.17)	66.6 (2.62)	1,581.9 (62.28)
Average precipitation days (≥ 1.0 mm)	6.7	7.3	11.2	10.7	10.7	11.6	10.1	7.3	11.4	11.8	8.5	6.7	114
Mean monthly sunshine hours	189.5	173.3	176.6	187.4	184.2	140.1	165.9	204.3	149.5	136.8	145.2	168.1	2,020.8
Source: Japan Meteorological Agency

== Demographics ==
Per Japanese census data, the population of Kashima has recently plateaued after a long period of growth.

Historical population
Year	Pop.	±%
1920	18,922	—
1930	20,284	+7.2%
1940	21,701	+7.0%
1950	27,481	+26.6%
1960	26,811	−2.4%
1970	34,700	+29.4%
1980	51,355	+48.0%
1990	59,092	+15.1%
2000	62,287	+5.4%
2010	66,093	+6.1%
2020	66,950	+1.3%

== History ==
Kashima was developed from the Nara period together with the ichinomiya of Hitachi Province, Kashima Shrine. After the Meiji Restoration, the town of Kashima was established with the creation of the modern municipalities system on April 1, 1889 within Kashima District. In 1954, Kashima annexed with the neighboring villages of Takamatsu, Toyosu, Toyosato and Namino. Kashima merged with the village of Ono on September 1, 1995 and was elevated to city status.

== Government ==
Kashima has a mayor-council form of government with a directly elected mayor and a unicameral city council of 20 members. Kashima contributes one member to the Ibaraki Prefectural Assembly. In terms of national politics, the city is part of Ibaraki 2nd district of the lower house of the Diet of Japan.

== Economy ==
Kashima is the central city of the Kashima Industrial Zone, and it has a large industrial park with about 1500 factories, especially petrochemical and steel plants. The Japanese government created this zone in 1963, and the development was mostly completed in 1973. Agriculture and commercial fishing also play a part in the local economy.

== Education ==
Kashima has 12 public elementary schools and five public middle schools operated by the city government, and one public high school operated by the Ibaraki Prefectural Board of Education. There are also one private middle school and two private high schools.

== Sports ==
Kashima Antlers is the local J. League football club.

== Transportation ==
=== Railway ===
JR East – Kashima Line

- Kashimajingū - Kashima Soccer Stadium

- Kashima Rinkai Railway Ōarai Kashima Line

- Kashimanada - Kashima-Ōno - Chōjagahamashiosaihamanasukōenmae - Kōyadai - Kashima Soccer Stadium - Kashimajingū

=== Highway ===
- National Route 51
- National Route 124

=== Seaport ===
- Port of Kashima

== Sister cities ==
- (South Korea) Seogwipo, Jeju Province, Republic of Korea, since November 2003
- Yancheng, Jiangsu Province, China, since November 2008

== Local attractions ==
- Kashima Shrine

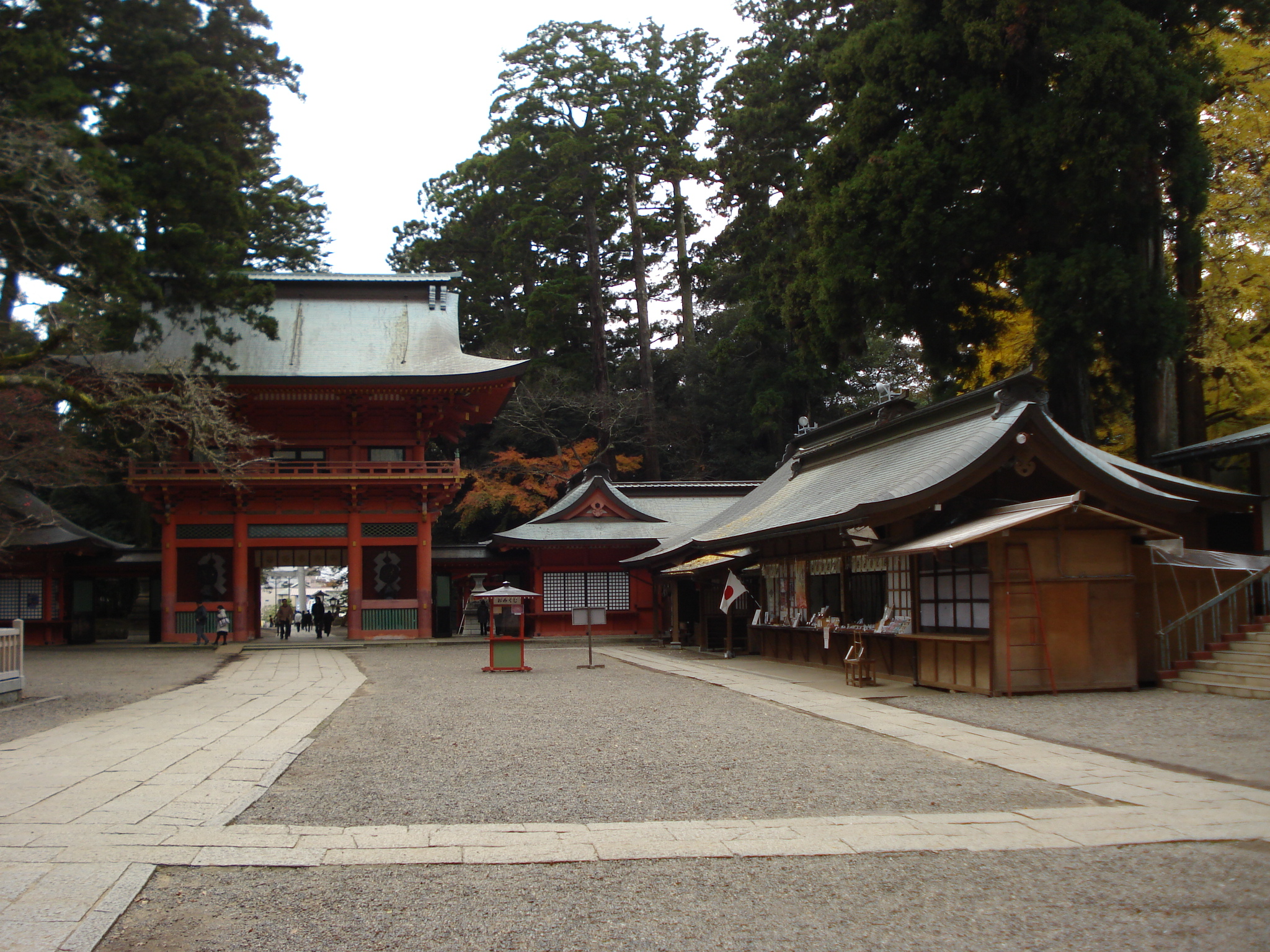

== Notable people ==
- Tsukahara Bokuden, swordsman
- Harumi Hanayagi, actress
- Yuichi Nemoto, former soccer player
- Ryuta Sasaki, former soccer player
- Hitoshi Sogahata, soccer player
- Juri Takahashi, singer, dancer, K-pop idol and former J-pop idol, member of K-pop girlgroup Rocket Punch

== Gallery ==
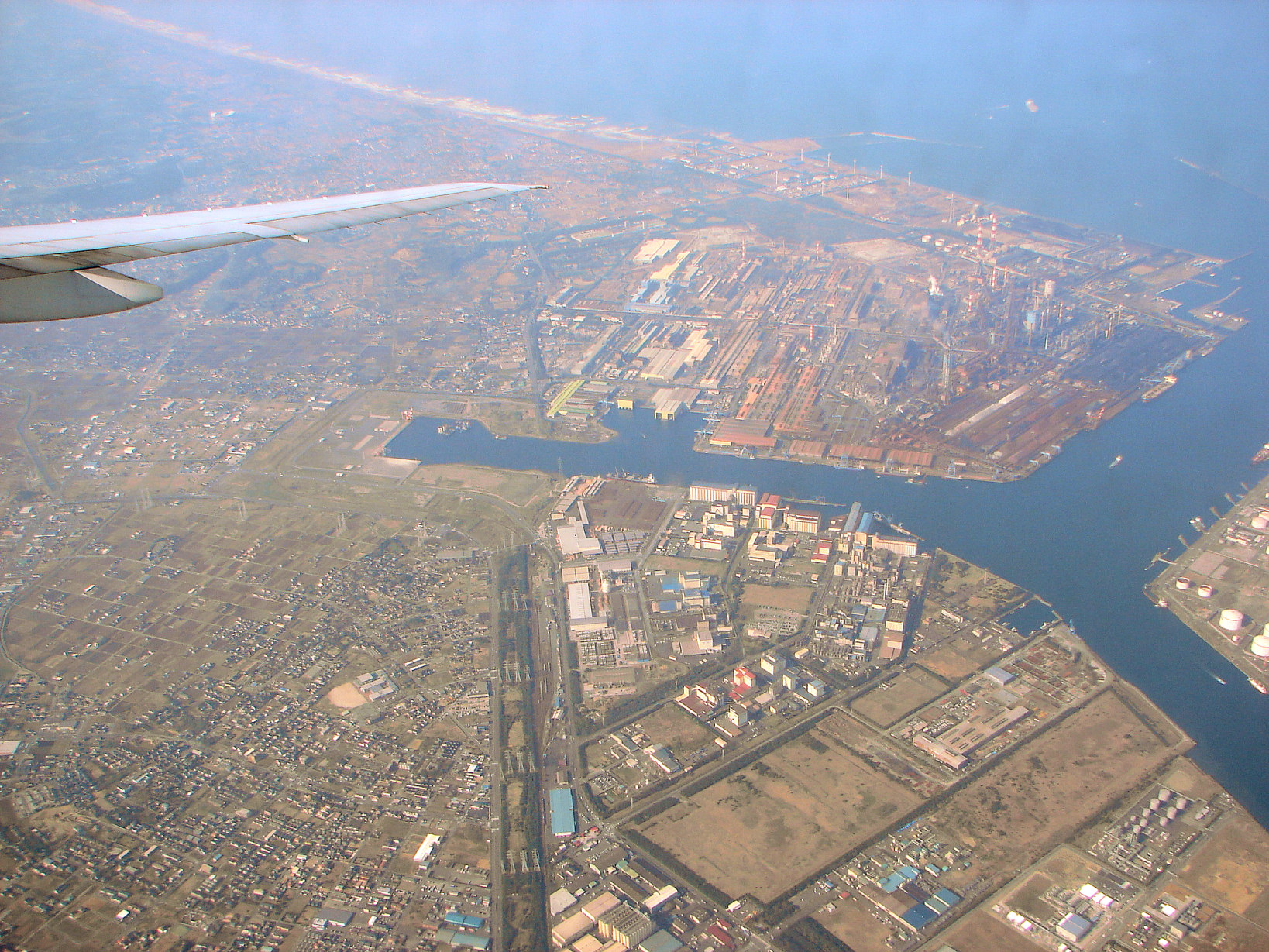
Port of Kashima with Kamisu in the foreground

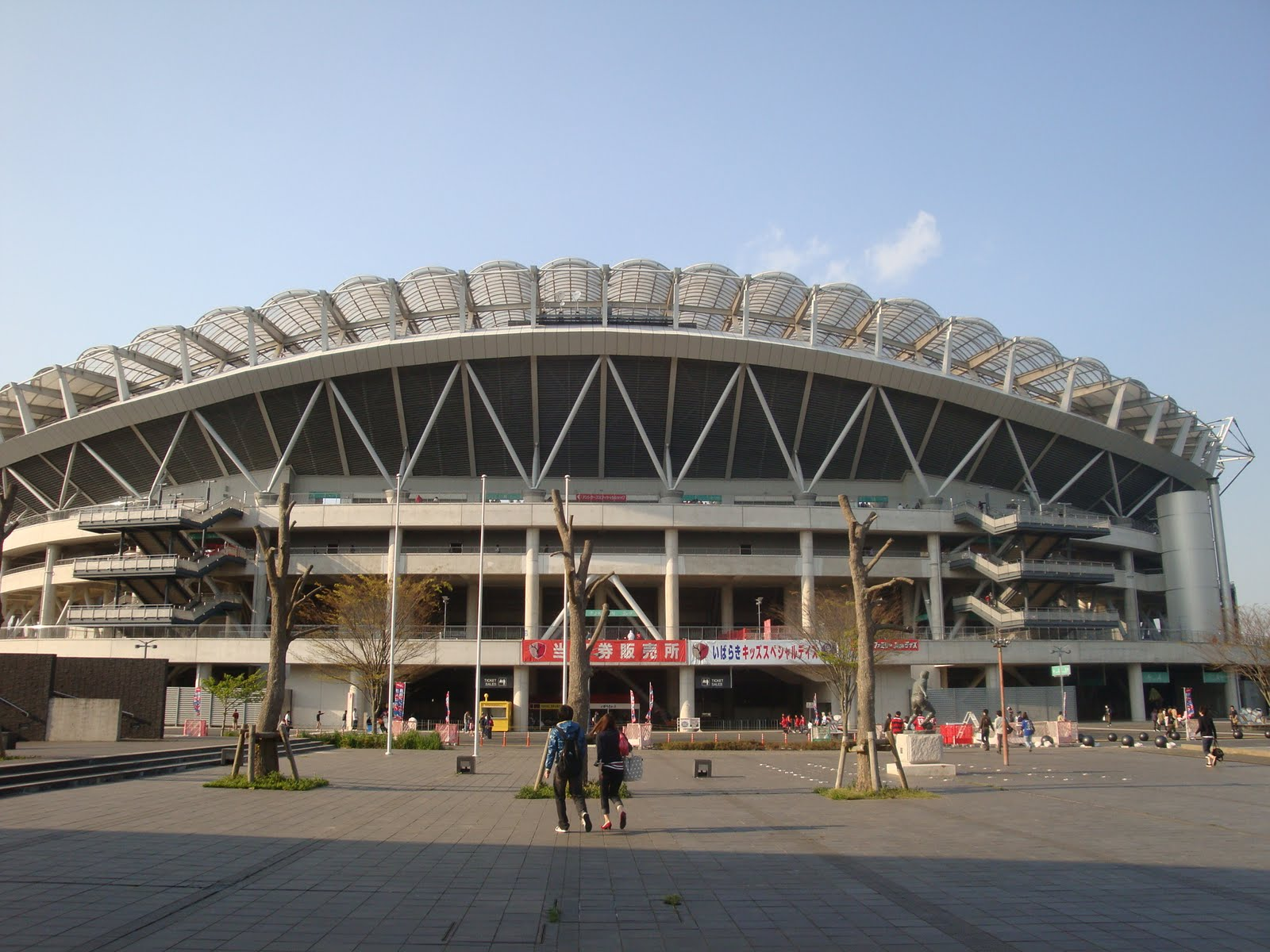
Kashima Soccer Stadium

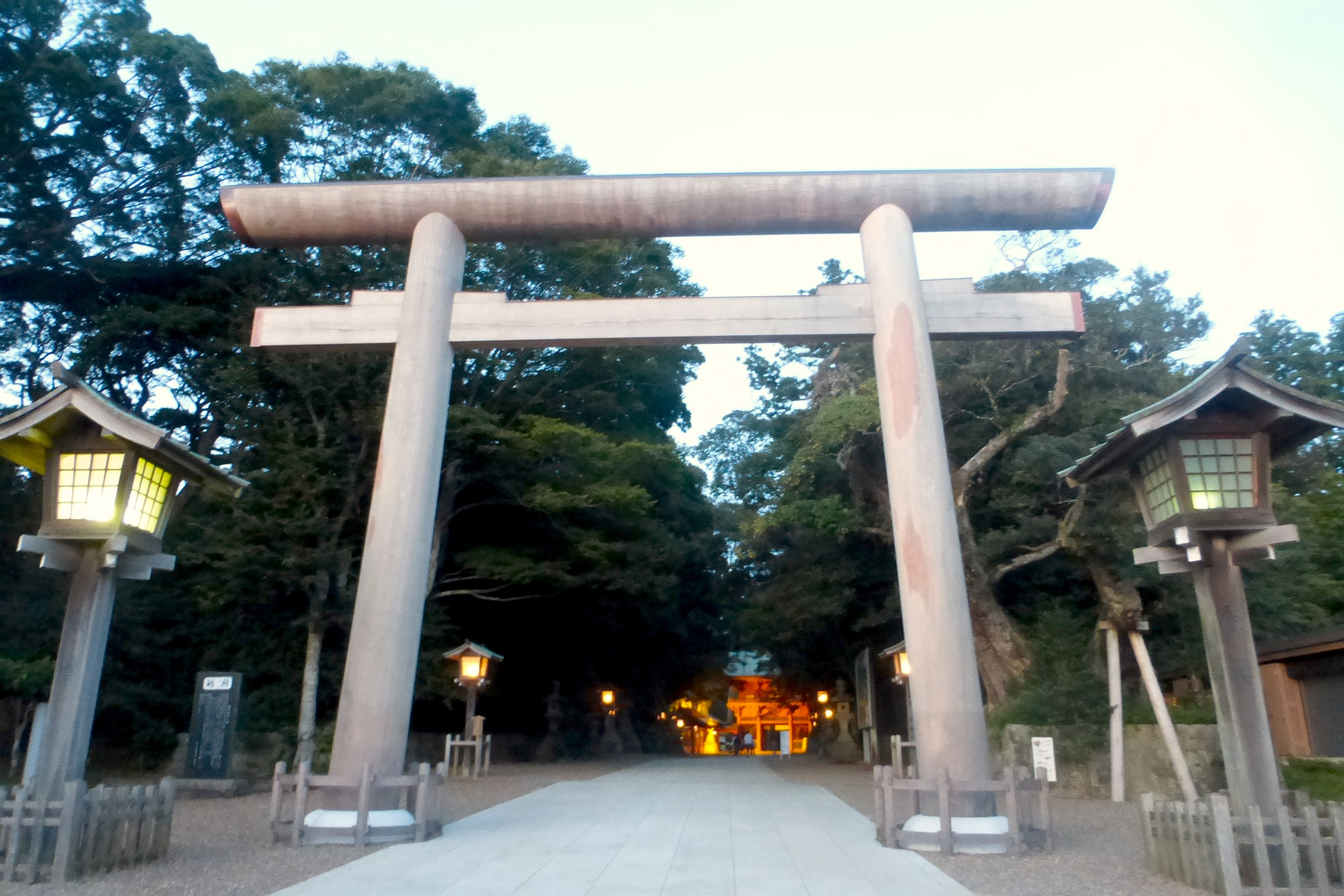
The Torii Gate at the entrance of Kashima Shrine

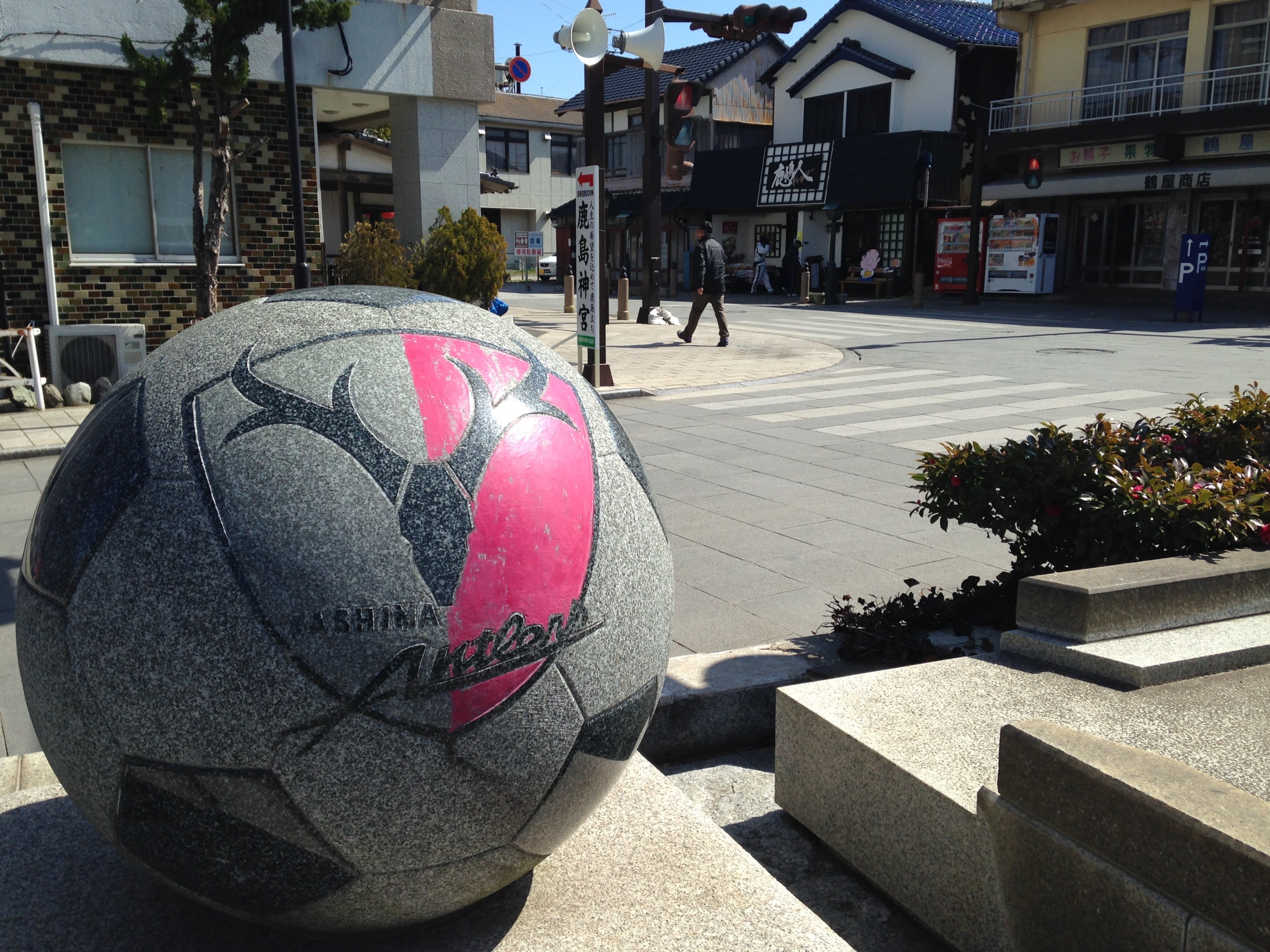
Monument for Kashima Antlers near Kashima Shrine
