= Ōarai Kashima Line =

Railway line in Ibaraki prefecture, Japan

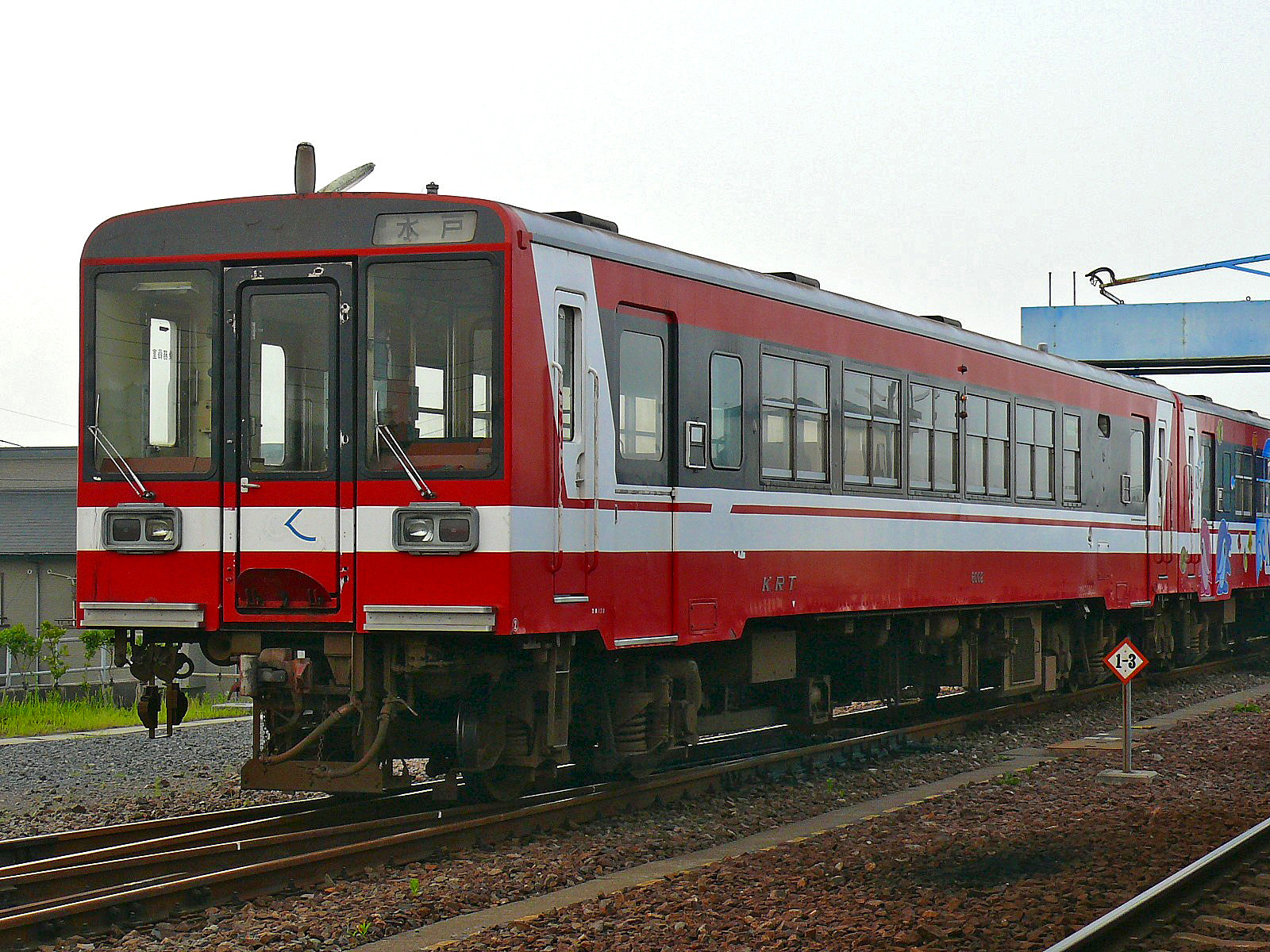
- A Kashima Rinkai Railway 6000 series diesel railcar in August 2007

Overview
- Native name: 鹿島臨海鉄道大洗鹿島線
- Status: In operation
- Owner: Kashima Rinkai Railway
- Locale: Ibaraki Prefecture
- Termini: Mito; Kashima Soccer Stadium
- Stations: 15

Service
- Operator: Kashima Rinkai Railway
- Depot: None
- Rolling stock: 6000 series DMU, 8000 series DMU, KRD series diesel locomotive

History
- Opened: 14 March 1985

Technical
- Line length: 53.0 km (32.9 mi)
- Number of tracks: Entire line single tracked
- Character: Rural and urban
- Track gauge: 1,067 mm (3 ft 6 in)
- Minimum radius: 500 m
- Electrification: None
- Operating speed: 95 km/h (59 mph)

The Kashima Rinkai Railway Ōarai Kashima Line (鹿島臨海鉄道大洗鹿島線, Kashima Rinkai Tetsudō Ōarai Kashima-sen) is a 53.0 km Japanese railway line in Ibaraki Prefecture, which connects Mito Station in Mito with Kashima Soccer Stadium Station in Kashima. It is owned and run by the third-sector railway operating company Kashima Rinkai Railway (KRT).

== Stations ==
| Line | Station | Japanese | Between (km) | Distance (km) | Transfers | Location |
|---|---|---|---|---|---|---|
| Ōarai Kashima | Mito | 水戸 | - | 0.0 | ■ Jōban Line ■Suigun Line | Mito |
| Ōarai Kashima | Higashi-Mito | 東水戸 | 3.8 | 3.8 | | Mito |
| Ōarai Kashima | Tsunezumi | 常澄 | 4.5 | 8.3 | | Mito |
| Ōarai Kashima | Ōarai | 大洗 | 3.3 | 11.6 | | Ōarai |
| Ōarai Kashima | Hinuma | 涸沼 | 6.4 | 18.0 | | Hokota |
| Ōarai Kashima | Kashima-Asahi | 鹿島旭 | 4.8 | 22.8 | | Hokota |
| Ōarai Kashima | Tokushuku | 徳宿 | 3.9 | 26.7 | | Hokota |
| Ōarai Kashima | Shin-Hokota | 新鉾田 | 4.3 | 31.0 | | Hokota |
| Ōarai Kashima | Kitaurakohan | 北浦湖畔 | 3.9 | 34.9 | | Hokota |
| Ōarai Kashima | Taiyō | 大洋 | 4.1 | 39.0 | | Hokota |
| Ōarai Kashima | Kashimanada | 鹿島灘 | 4.1 | 43.1 | | Kashima |
| Ōarai Kashima | Kashima-Ōno | 鹿島大野 | 3.0 | 46.1 | | Kashima |
| Ōarai Kashima | Chōjagahamashiosaihamanasukōenmae | 長者ヶ浜潮騒はまなす公園前 | 2.3 | 48.4 | | Kashima |
| Ōarai Kashima | Kōyadai | 荒野台 | 1.7 | 50.1 | | Kashima |
| Ōarai Kashima | Kashima Soccer Stadium | 鹿島サッカースタジアム | 2.9 | 53.0 | ■ Kashima Line ■ Kashima Rinkō Line (Freight) | Kashima |
| Kashima Line | Kashima Soccer Stadium | 鹿島サッカースタジアム | 2.9 | 53.0 | ■ Kashima Line ■ Kashima Rinkō Line (Freight) | Kashima |
| Kashima Line | Kashima-Jingū | 鹿島神宮 | 3.2 | - | ■ Kashima Line | Kashima |

== Rolling stock ==
As of 1 April 2017, passenger services on the line were operated by a fleet of 15 6000 series diesel railcars and three 8000 series diesel railcars. The railway also operates three diesel locomotives: Class KRD locomotive number KRD 5 and two Class KRD64 locomotives, KRD64-1 and KRD64-2.

The first 8000 series diesel car, 8001, entered revenue service on 26 March 2016.

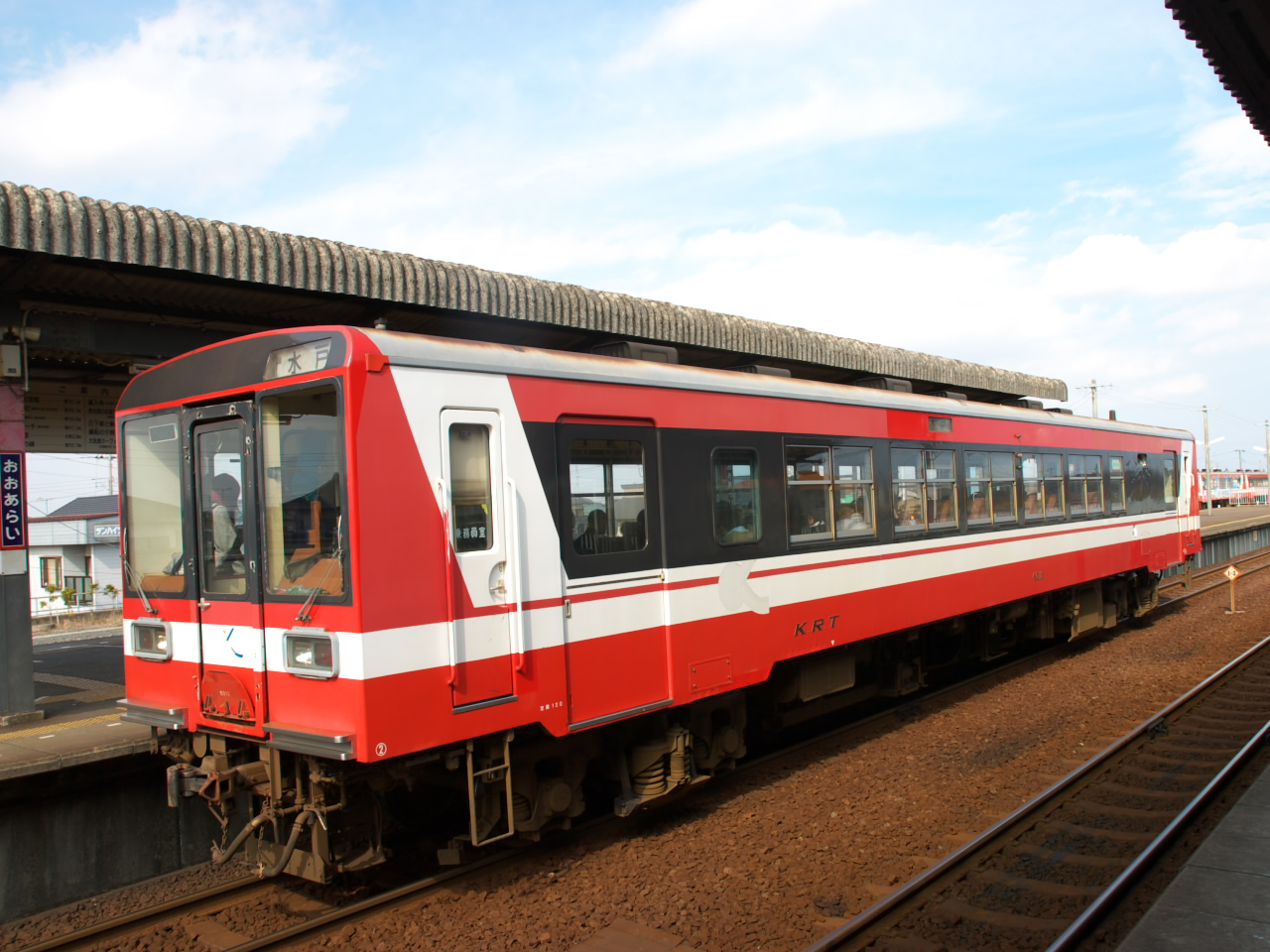
A 6000 series DMU car in February 2007

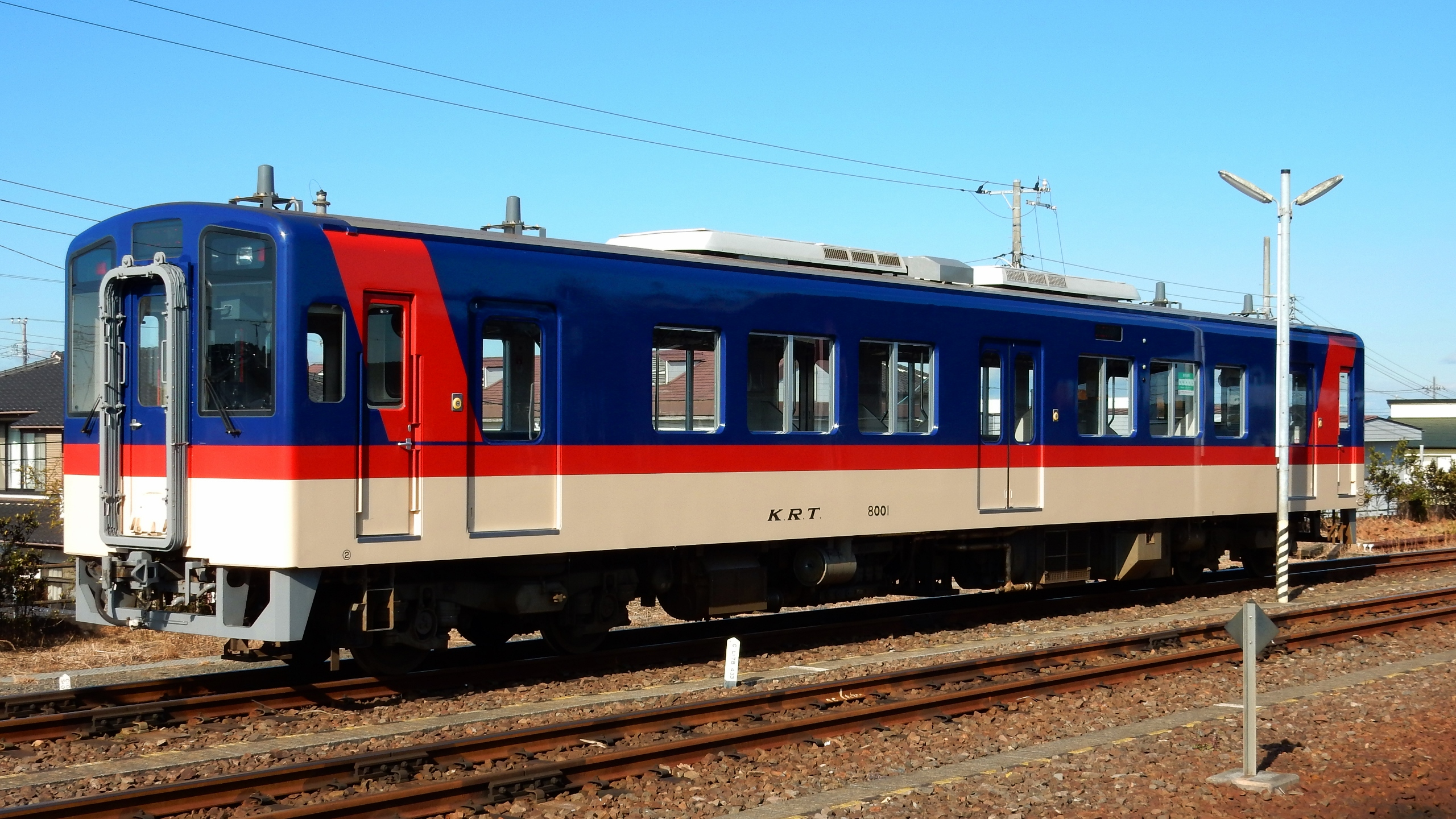
8000 series car 8001 in January 2017

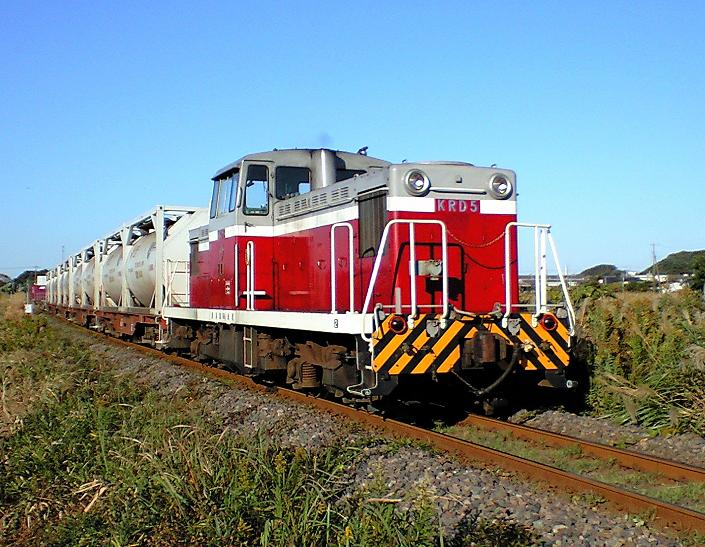
KRD 5 in service in November 2008

=== 6000 series fleet details ===
The individual car histories of the 6000 series fleet are as follows.

| Car No. | Manufacturer | Date delivered | Date withdrawn |
|---|---|---|---|
| 6001 | Nippon Sharyo | 14 January 1985 | |
| 6002 | Nippon Sharyo | 14 January 1985 | 7 January 2017 |
| 6003 | Nippon Sharyo | 14 January 1985 | |
| 6004 | Nippon Sharyo | 14 January 1985 | |
| 6005 | Nippon Sharyo | 14 January 1985 | |
| 6006 | Nippon Sharyo | 14 January 1985 | |
| 6007 | Nippon Sharyo | 28 February 1987 | |
| 6008 | Nippon Sharyo | 28 February 1987 | 28 March 2016 |
| 6009 | Nippon Sharyo | 25 August 1989 | |
| 6010 | Nippon Sharyo | 25 August 1989 | |
| 6011 | Nippon Sharyo | 25 August 1989 | |
| 6012 | Nippon Sharyo | 25 August 1989 | 28 March 2016 |
| 6013 | Nippon Sharyo | 1 September 1990 | |
| 6014 | Nippon Sharyo | 1 September 1990 | |
| 6015 | Nippon Sharyo | 1 September 1990 | |
| 6016 | Nippon Sharyo | 13 July 1992 | |
| 6017 | Nippon Sharyo | 13 July 1992 | |
| 6018 | Nippon Sharyo | 30 March 1994 | |
| 6019 | Nippon Sharyo | 30 March 1994 | 7 January 2017 |

=== 8000 series fleet details ===
The individual car histories of the 8000 series fleet are as follows.

| Car No. | Manufacturer | Date delivered | Date withdrawn |
|---|---|---|---|
| 8001 | Niigata Transys | 16 February 2016 | |
| 8002 | Niigata Transys | 7 January 2017 | |
| 8003 | Niigata Transys | 7 January 2017 | |

=== Former rolling stock ===
The following types also previously operated on the line.

- 2000 series DMU cars 2001 to 2004 (former JNR KiHa 20 series cars, operated from December 1985 until December 1991)
- 7000 series two-car diesel multiple unit (DMU) train owned by Ibaraki Prefecture and reserved for special event services. (Operated from 1992 until October 2015)
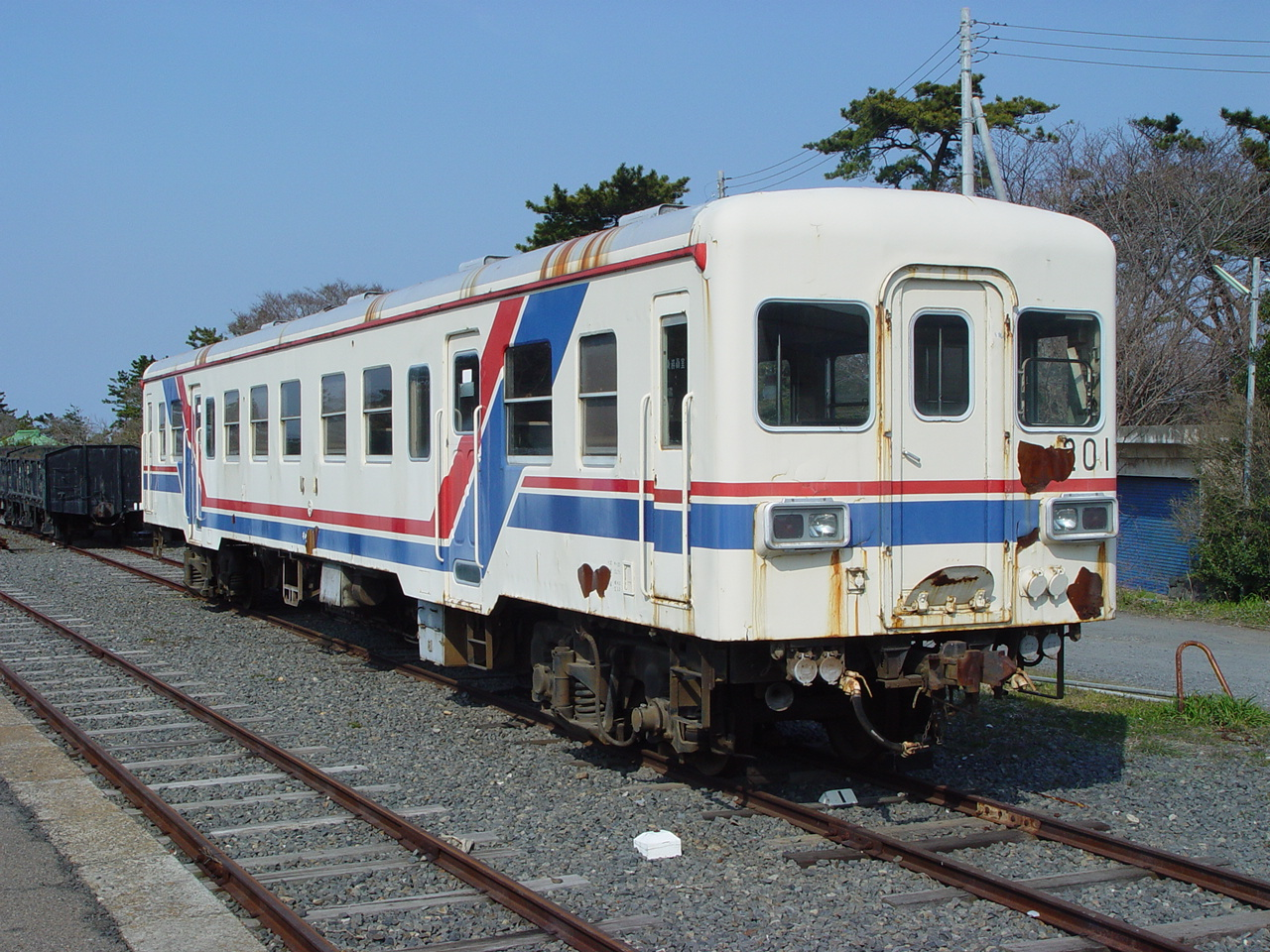
A former Kashima Rinkai Railway 2000 series car in its later guise as Ibaraki Kotsu 200 series car 201 in March 2003

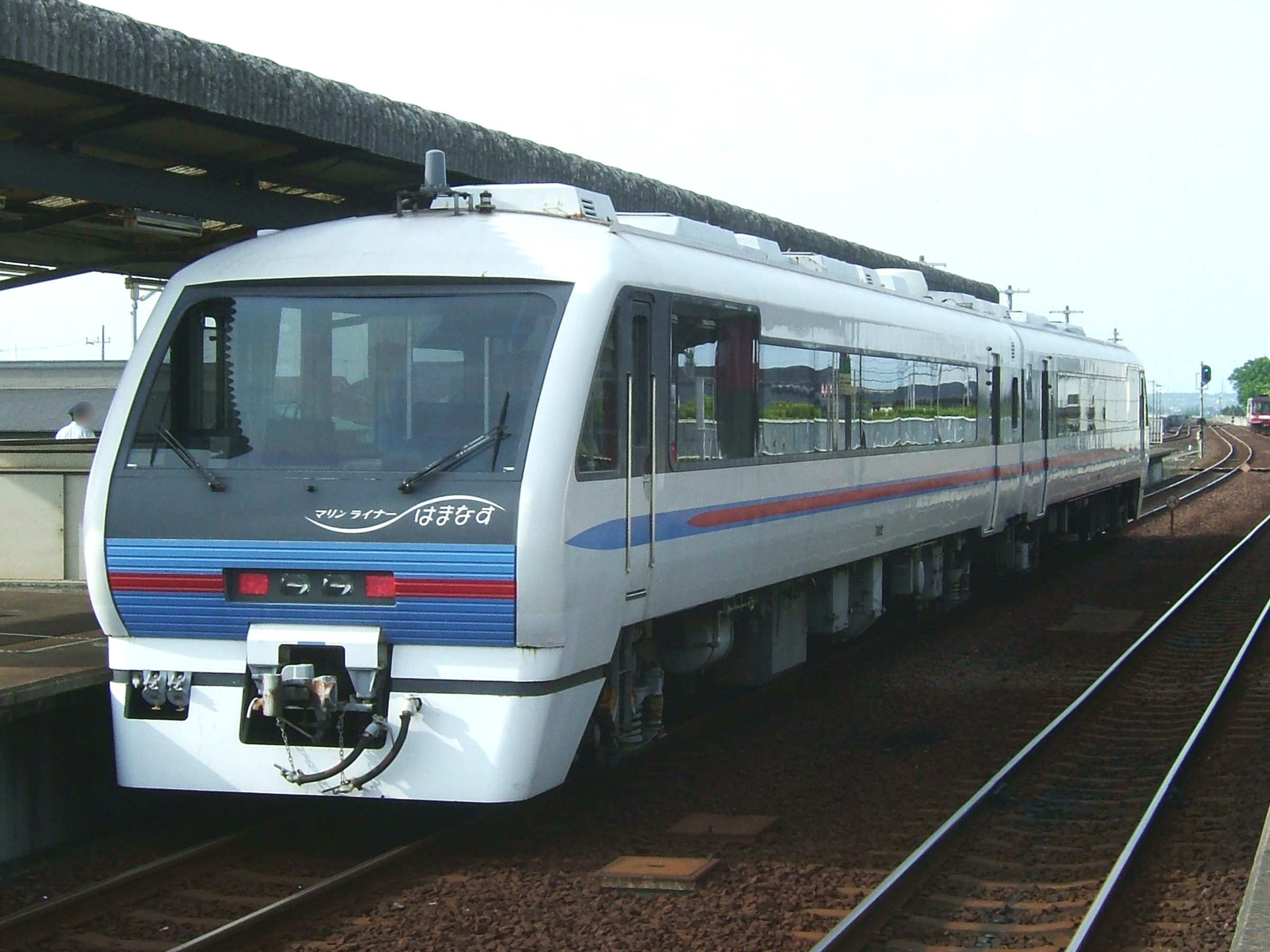
The 7000 series DMU in service in June 2007

=== 2000 series fleet details ===
The individual car histories of the 2000 series fleet were as follows.

| Car No. | Manufacturer | Built | Former number | Date introduced | Date withdrawn |
|---|---|---|---|---|---|
| 2001 | Nippon Sharyo | January 1961 | KiHa 20 429 | 18 December 1985 | 29 December 1991 |
| 2002 | Teikoku Sharyo | May 1961 | KiHa 20 421 | 18 December 1985 | 23 December 1989 |
| 2003 | Tokyu Car | February 1960 | KiHa 20 274 | 25 December 1985 | 12 October 1990 |
| 2004 | Tokyu Car | April 1959 | KiHa 20 273 | 25 December 1985 | 29 December 1991 |

=== 7000 series fleet details ===
The individual car histories of the two-car 7000 series set were as follows.

| Car No. | Manufacturer | Date delivered | Date withdrawn |
|---|---|---|---|
| 7001 | Nippon Sharyo | 13 July 1992 | 24 October 2015 |
| 7002 | Nippon Sharyo | 13 July 1992 | 24 October 2015 |

== History ==
The line opened on 14 March 1985 between Mito and Kita-Kashima (now Kashima Soccer Stadium) stations.

Freight operations over the line commenced from 1 November 1989, but were discontinued from 16 March 1996.

Wanman driver-only operation began on the line from 1 April 2001.

== In popular culture ==
The railway is seen in a couple of episodes in the popular anime "Girls und Panzer," most notably in episode 7, "Up Next is Anzio", after the Anglerfish team visits the grandmother of teammate Mako Reizei. The next time we see the railway is in Episode 11 when the two car train is seen pulling several flatcars with the teams tanks enroute to the finals match with Kuromuromine.

Taking advantage of the animes popularity and Ōarai becoming an "anime pilgrimage" site, the railway operates a "Girls und Panzer" themed train, with various cars featuring the characters of the show.
