= Japan National Route 51 =

National highway in Japan

National Route 51
- 国道51号

Route information
- Length: 124 km (77 mi)
- Existed: 1 April 1963–present

Major junctions
- North end: National Route 50 in Mito, Ibaraki
- South end: National Route 14 / National Route 126 in Chūō-ku, Chiba

Location
- Country: Japan

Highway system
- National highways of Japan; Expressways of Japan
← National Route 50	→ National Route 52

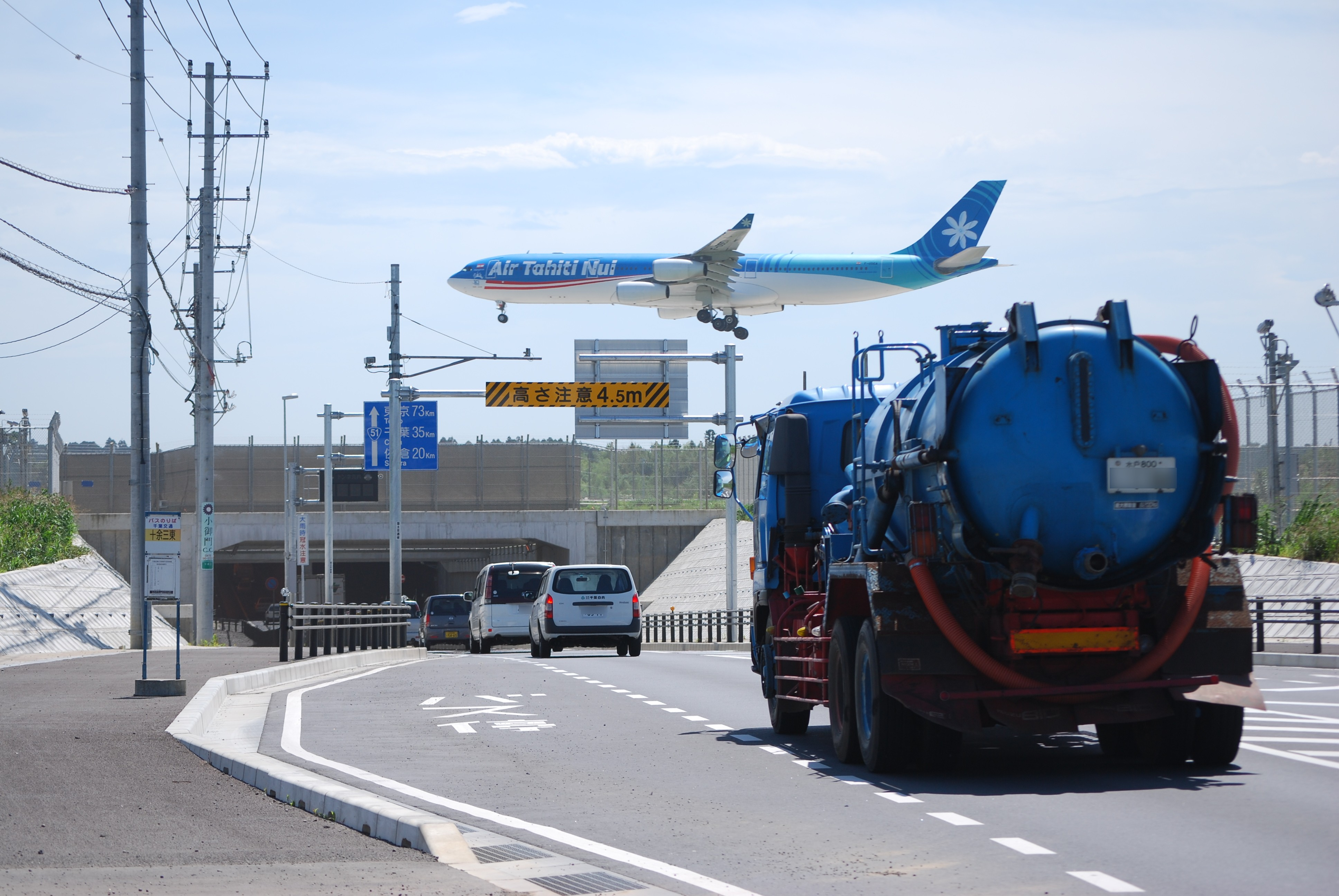

National Route 51 is a national highway of Japan connecting Chūō-ku, Chiba and Mito, Ibaraki.

== Route data ==
- Length: 124 km (77.05 mi).

== History ==
Route 51 was originally designated on 18 May 1953 as National Route 123, and this was redesignated Route 51 when the route was promoted to a Class 1 highway.
