= Kashima Rinkai Railway =

Railway company in Ibaraki Prefecture, Japan

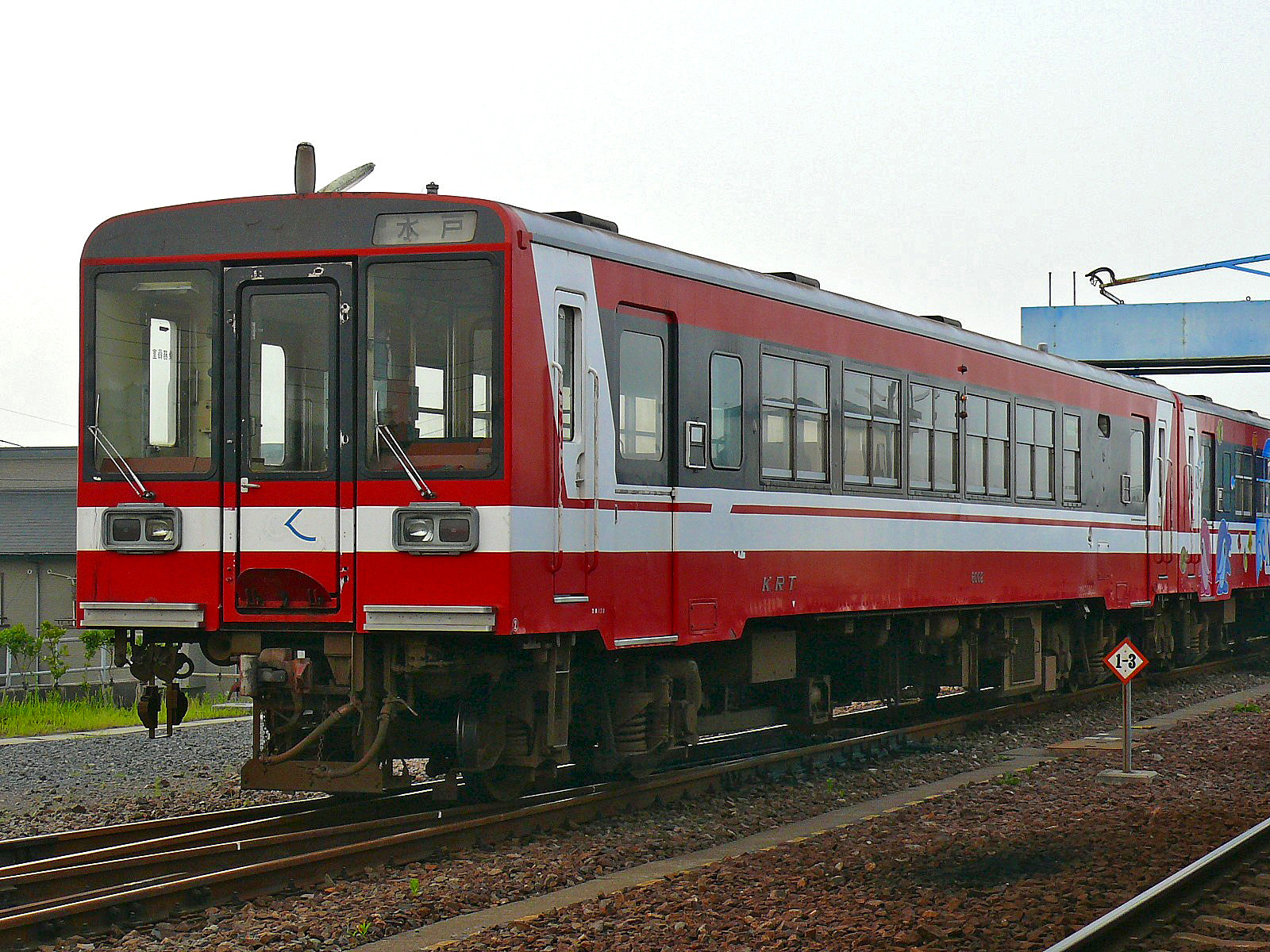
A Kashima Rinkai Railway 6000 series diesel railcar

Kashima Rinkai Railway (鹿島臨海鉄道, Kashima Rinkai Tetsudō; lit. 'Kashima Seaside Railway'), abbreviated as KRT or Rintetsu, is a third-sector railway company in Ibaraki Prefecture, Japan. It was founded in 1969 to transport freight to and from the coastal industrial area of Kashima.

== Lines ==
- Kashima Rinkō Line (freight only): Kashima Soccer Stadium — Okunoyahama
- Ōarai Kashima Line: Mito — Kashima Soccer Stadium

== History ==
The company was founded on 1 April 1969.

On 12 November 1970, the company opened the freight-only line between Kita-Kashima (present-day Kashima Soccer Stadium) and Okunoyahama. On 14 March 1985, the company opened the passenger line from Mito to Kashima Soccer Stadium.

== In popular culture ==
The railway is featured in the anime Girls und Panzer, most notably in episode 7, "Up Next is Anzio", after the Anglerfish team visits the grandmother of teammate Mako Reizei. The next time we see the railway, the two-car train is pulling several flatcars with the team's tanks en route to the finals match with Kuromuromine.

Taking advantage of the anime's popularity, and with Ōarai becoming a seichi junrei (anime pilgrimage) site, the railway operates a Girls und Panzer-themed train, with various cars featuring the characters of the show.

== See also ==
- List of railway companies in Japan
