= Kantetsu Green Bus =

Bus company in Kanto, Japan

Kantetsu Green Bus Co., Ltd.
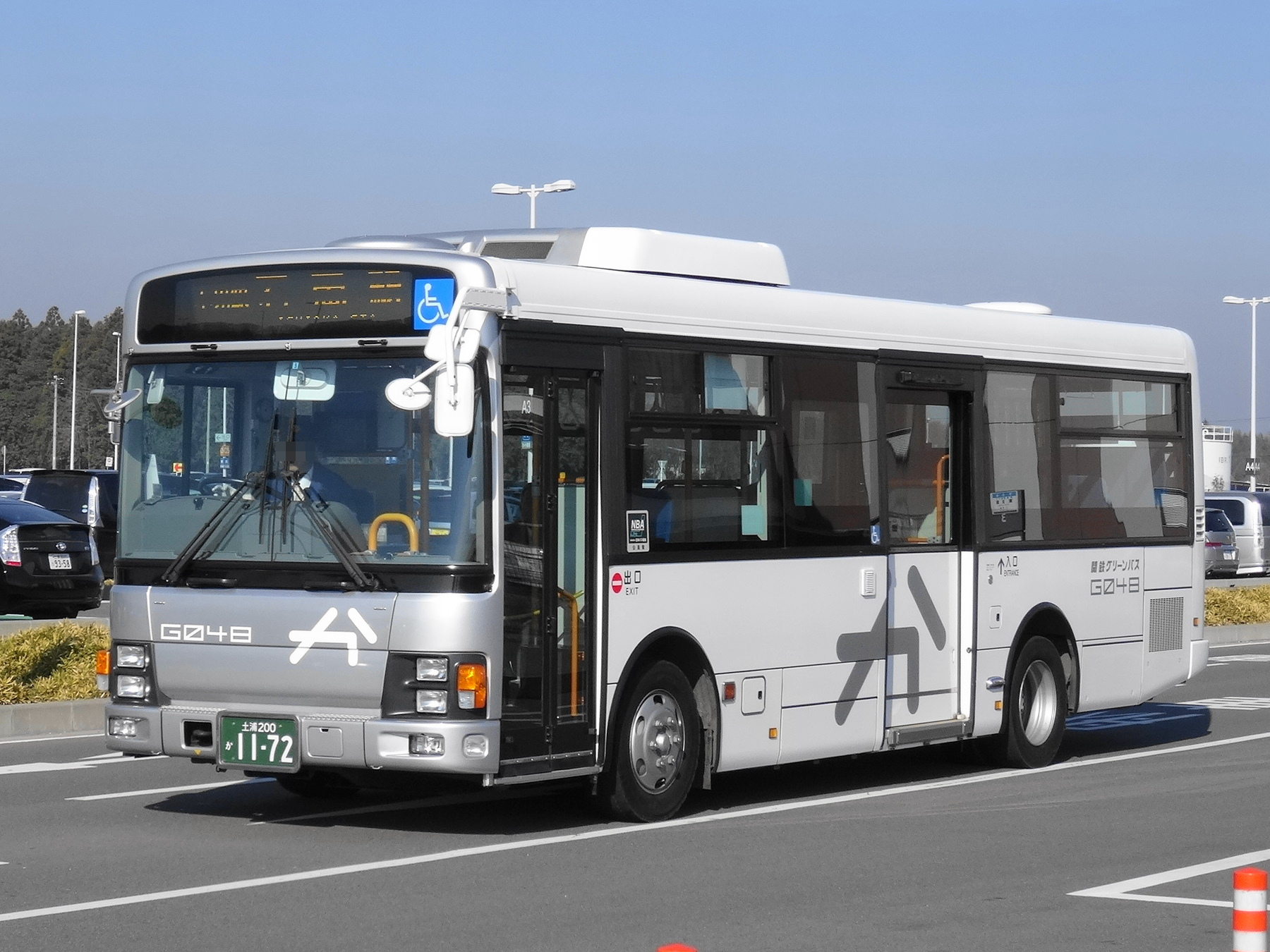
- An Isuzu Erga Mio bus in the Kashitetsu Bus fleet.
- Parent: Kanto Railway
- Founded: 15 March 2002
- Headquarters: 5–18 Yukisatogawa, Yawata, Ishioka, Ibaraki, Japan (茨城県石岡市行里川５－１８)
- Service area: Ibaraki
- Service type: Bus
- Fleet: 64 buses
- Chief executive: 長津 博樹
- Website: http://kantetsu.co.jp/green-bus/

The Kantetsu Green Bus Co., Ltd. (関鉄グリーンバス株式会社, Kantegu Gurīn Basu Kabushiki-gaisha) was a bus company within the Kanto Railway, and also belonged to Keisei Group. The company was established on 15 March 2002 to inherit the partial business of the Kanto Railway's bus department. In 16 July 2024, two companies were merged into Kanto Railway.

== Overview ==
In the interests of economic efficiency, the Hokota office of Kanto Railway was split into Kantetsu Melon Bus in 2001; and in 2002, Kantetsu Green Bus was established as a wholly owned subsidiary in the Ishioka area. Service areas are based in Ishioka, and a part of bus routes are operated on Tsuchiura. In 2005, Kantetsu Green Bus consolidated Kantetsu Melon Bus, so the company has had bus routes which operated in Hokota.

Since 2007, the company has also operated Kashitetsu Bus, a bustitution of the Kashima Railway, which was taken out of service in 2007. Service areas of the company have many tourist resources, including Ibaraki Airport, Kairaku-en, and Mount Tsukuba.

== History ==
- 1 June 2001 – Hokota Office of Kanto Railway was split into Kantetsu Melon Bus.
- 30 September 2001 – A part of the bus routes belonging to the Kanshima Office of Kanto Railway was transferred to Kantetsu Melon Bus.
- 15 March 2002 – Kantetsu Green Bus was established.
- 1 July 2002 – A part of routes that had belong to the Kakioka and Ishioka Office of Kanto Railway was transferred to Kantetsu Green Bus.
- 2005 – Kantetsu Green Bus was consolidated with Kantetsu Melon Bus, which was abolished.
- 2007 – As Kashima Railway was taken out of service, Kashitetsu Bus began operation.
- 11 March 2010 – Airport Bus between Ibaraki Airport and Ishioka Station or Shin-Hokota Station began operation.
- 1 June 2012 – Kasumigaura Koiki Bus began operation between Tsuchiura Station and Tamatsukuri Station.
- 21 May 2016 – Koiki Renkei Bus began operation around the Namegata・Itako・Kashima areas.
- 1 September 2016 – East Exit BRT Bus Terminal was installed.
- 16 March 2018 – IC cards such as Suica and PASMO were adapted for use on all bus routes.
- 28 April 2018 – Since accommodating IC cards, the company has sold the IC '1 Daily Pass Ticket', for use on almost bus routes of Kanto Railway Group. The ticket costs 710 yen to ride on all bus routes (excluding Community buses, Highway buses, and Tsukubasan Shuttle Bus).

== Office ==
- Ishioka Head Office
- Kakioka Office
- Hokota Office

== Routes ==
=== Highway bus ===
Name	Terminus	Via	Terminus	Note
ASŌ	Hokota Station	Shin-Hokota Station・Itako Station・Sawara Station・Katori Jingū	Tokyo Station	It is possible to get on and off at all bus stops which are situated in between Shin-Hokota Station and Sawara Station．

=== Route bus ===
- Kashitetsu Bus (BRT)
  - Shin-Hokota Station・Hokota Station・Tamatsukuri Station・Ibaraki Airport・Ishioka Station
- Kasumigaura Width Connection Bus
  - Tsuchiura Station – Tamatsukuri Station
- Hatori Station – Itashikiyama
- Kakioka Shako – Ishioka Station
- Shin-Hokota Station – Mito Station (Ibaraki)
- Shin-Hokota Station – Takahama Station (Ibaraki)
- Ibaraki Airport – Mito Station (Ibaraki)
- Ibaraki Airport – Takahama Station (Ibaraki)

== Kantetsu Purple Bus ==
Kantetsu Purple Bus Co., Ltd.
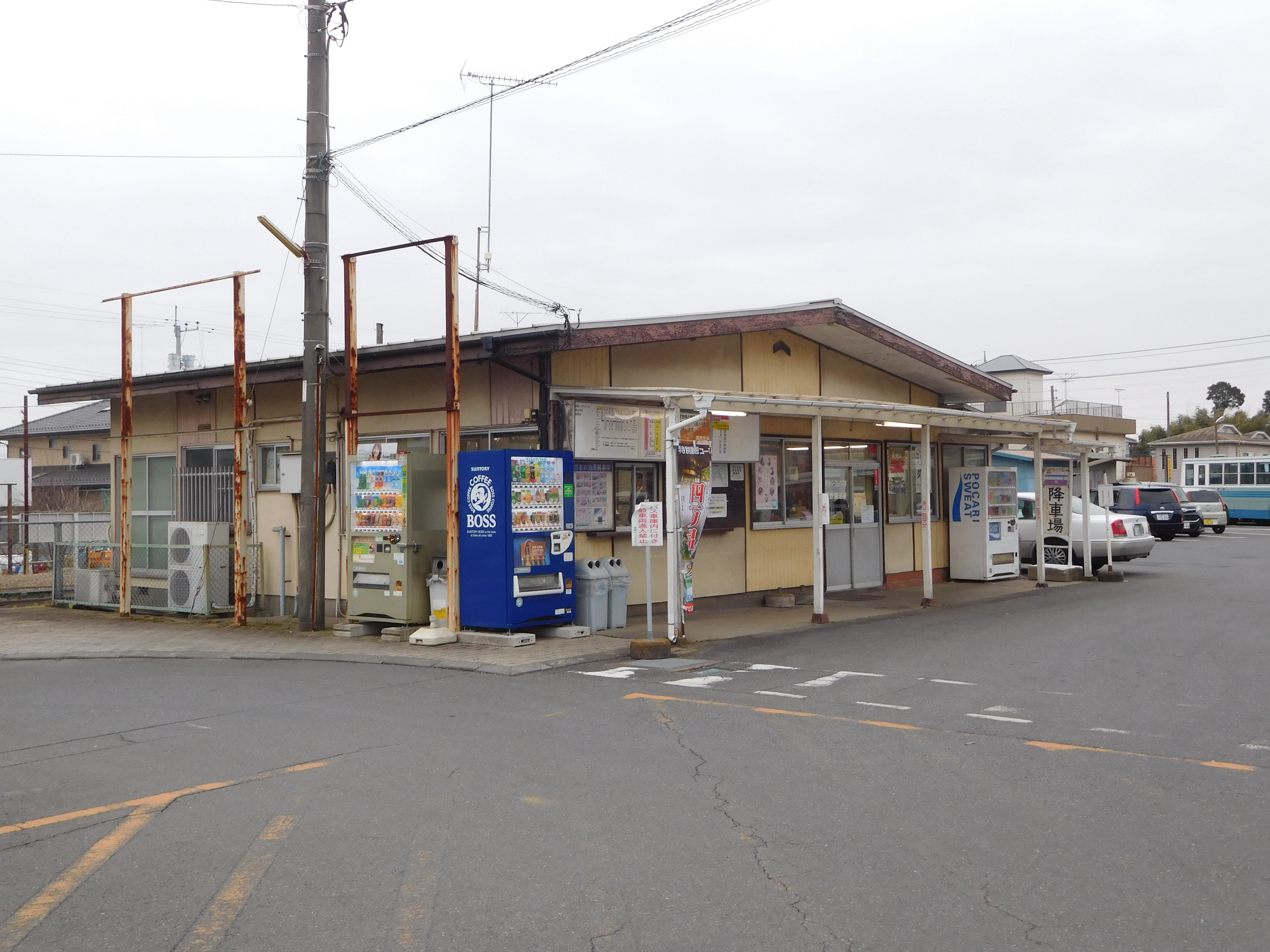
- Headquarters
- Parent: Kanto Railway
- Founded: 26 September 1978
- Headquarters: 〒315-0022; 5-18 Yukisatogawa, Yawata, Ishioka, Ibaraki, Japan (茨城県石岡市行里川５－１８)
- Service area: Ibaraki
- Service type: Bus
- Fleet: 25 buses
- Chief executive: 長津 博樹
- Website: http://kantetsu.co.jp/green-bus/

The Kantetsu Purple Bus Co., Ltd. (関鉄パープルバス株式会社, Kantegu Pa-puru Basu Kabushiki-gaisha) was a bus company within the Kanto Railway, and also belonged to Keisei Group. This company was established on 26 September 1978 to inherit the partial business of the Kanto Railway's bus department.

== Overview ==
As part of the business efficiency, the Tsukuba Kita office (Shimotsuma Branch) of Kanto Railway was transferred to Kantetsu Melon Bus on 1 June 2001.

== See also ==
- Kanto Railway
- Kashima Railway
- Keisei Bus
- Tokyo BRT
