= Hokota Station =

Railway station in Ibaraki, Japan

Coordinates: 36.1533°N 140.5075°E

Hokota Station 鉾田駅
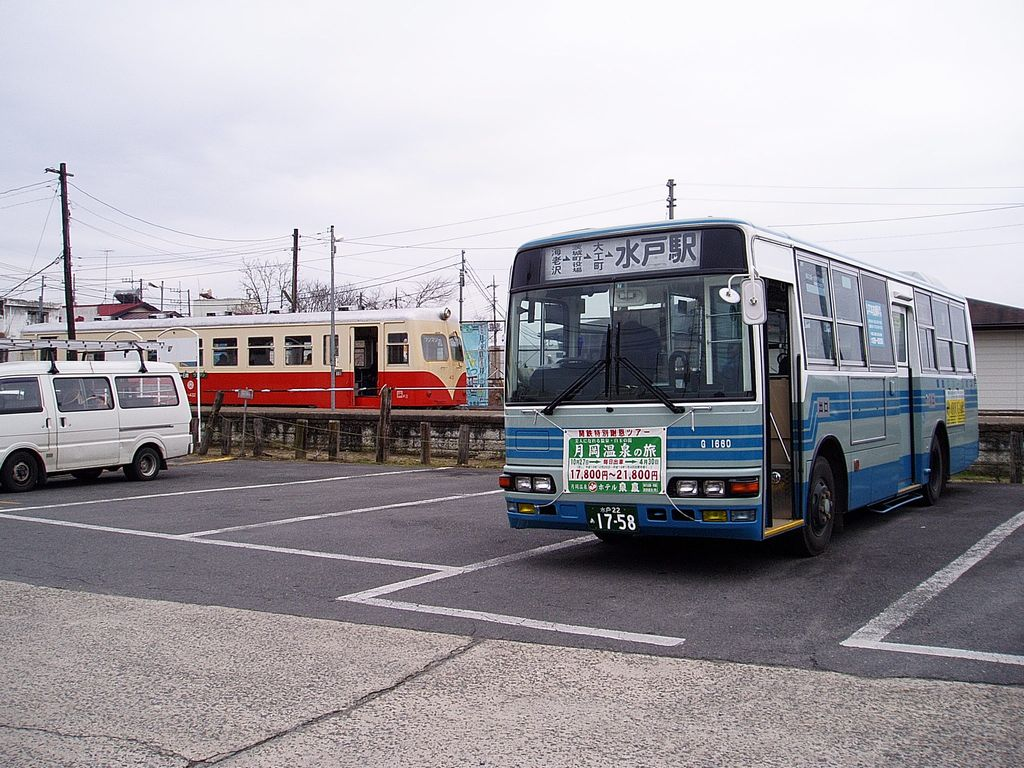
- Hokota Station and a bus of Kanto Railway（20 January 2007）

General information
- Location: 2457-2, Hokota Hokota, Ibaraki, Ibaraki Prefecture; Japan
- Operator: Kashima Railway
- Line: Kashima Railway
- Platforms: 1

History
- Opened: 1929
- Closed: 2007
Location

Hokota Station (鉾田駅, Hokota-eki) was a railway station on the Kashima Railway Line in Hokota, Ibaraki, Japan, operated by the Kashima Railway operator Kashima Railway. And, now, this station is used as a bus terminal by Kantetsu Green Bus.

In 2000, the station was selected as「関東の駅百選」by Ministry of Transport (Japan)（Ministry of Land, Infrastructure, Transport and Tourism）. But the station was abolished in 2007 because of abolition of Kashima Railway, and at present there is a platform which was used on the station.

Since the station was discontinued, a bus terminal which was located in front of the station has been used by Kantetsu Green Bus. But, the bus terminal has called Hokota Station since Kashima Railway was open to traffic.

== Outline ==
This station was a ground station. And, decorated a triangle of objet d'art on the roof. There were a stand-up soba noodle shop and a sold fish-shaped pancake filled with sweet bean paste shop that were operated by Kashima Railway.

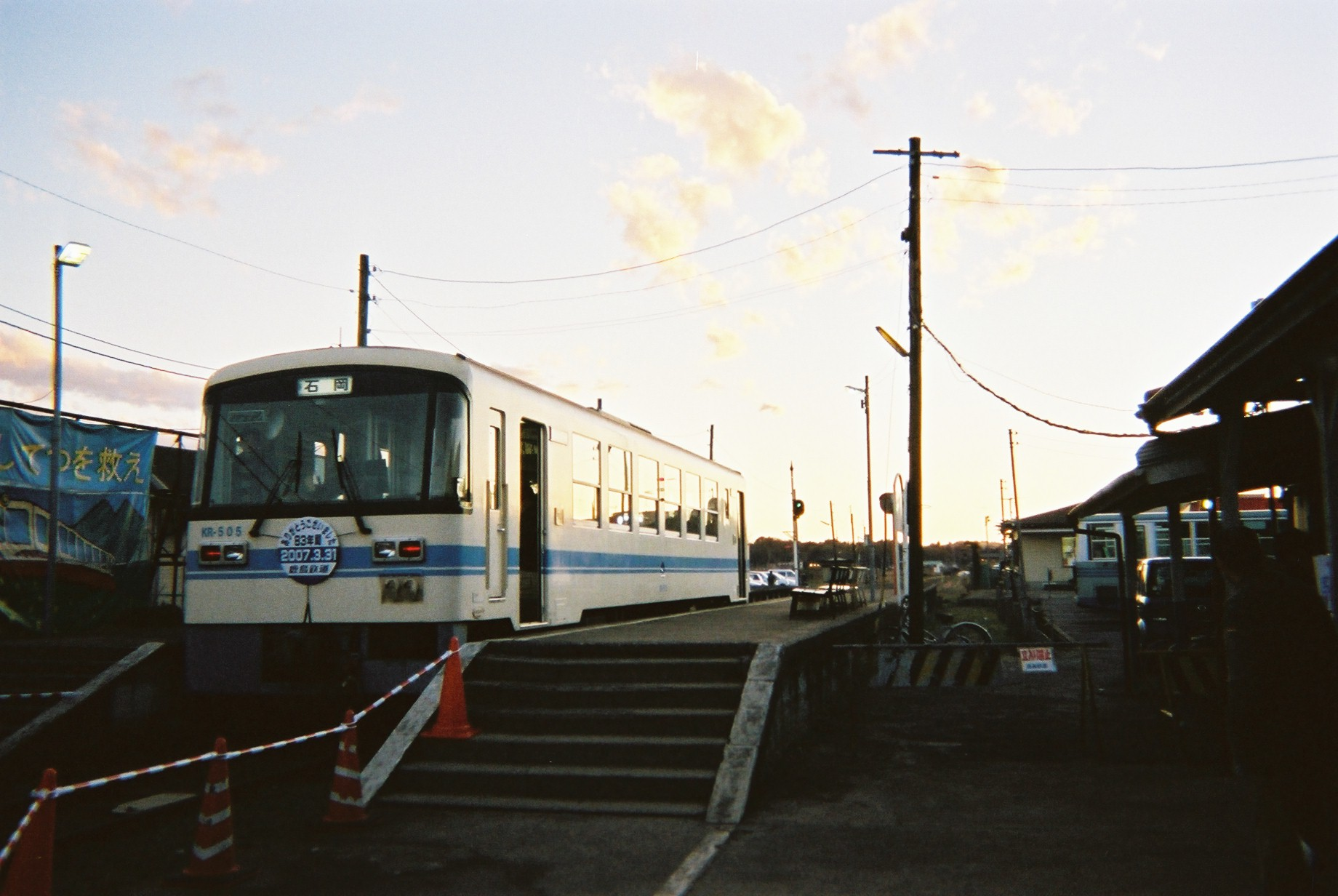
series KR505 and the station at dusk

As the station was selected「関東の駅100選」, there was a plan of keeping the station building, but the station building was demolished since the station building was a rather decrepit old facility. Volunteers have established "鉾田駅保存会" since 1 February 2008 and they tenanted the former site of the station and have purchased two vehicles of Kashima Railway from Kanto Railway. So, they operated and showed the vehicles once a month. But, they expired with Kanto Railway, so they moved the vehicles from this station to Hotpark Hokota（a facility for bathing） in 2009. And, they have donated the vehicles to Hokota, Ibaraki, but the vehicles have been maintained. A shop for sold fish-shaped pancake filled with sweet bean paste had been moved to the bus terminal. But, in 2011, the platform has been damaged due to Great East Japan Earthquake and the platform wasn't repaired, and the shop was closed and removed on August in the year.

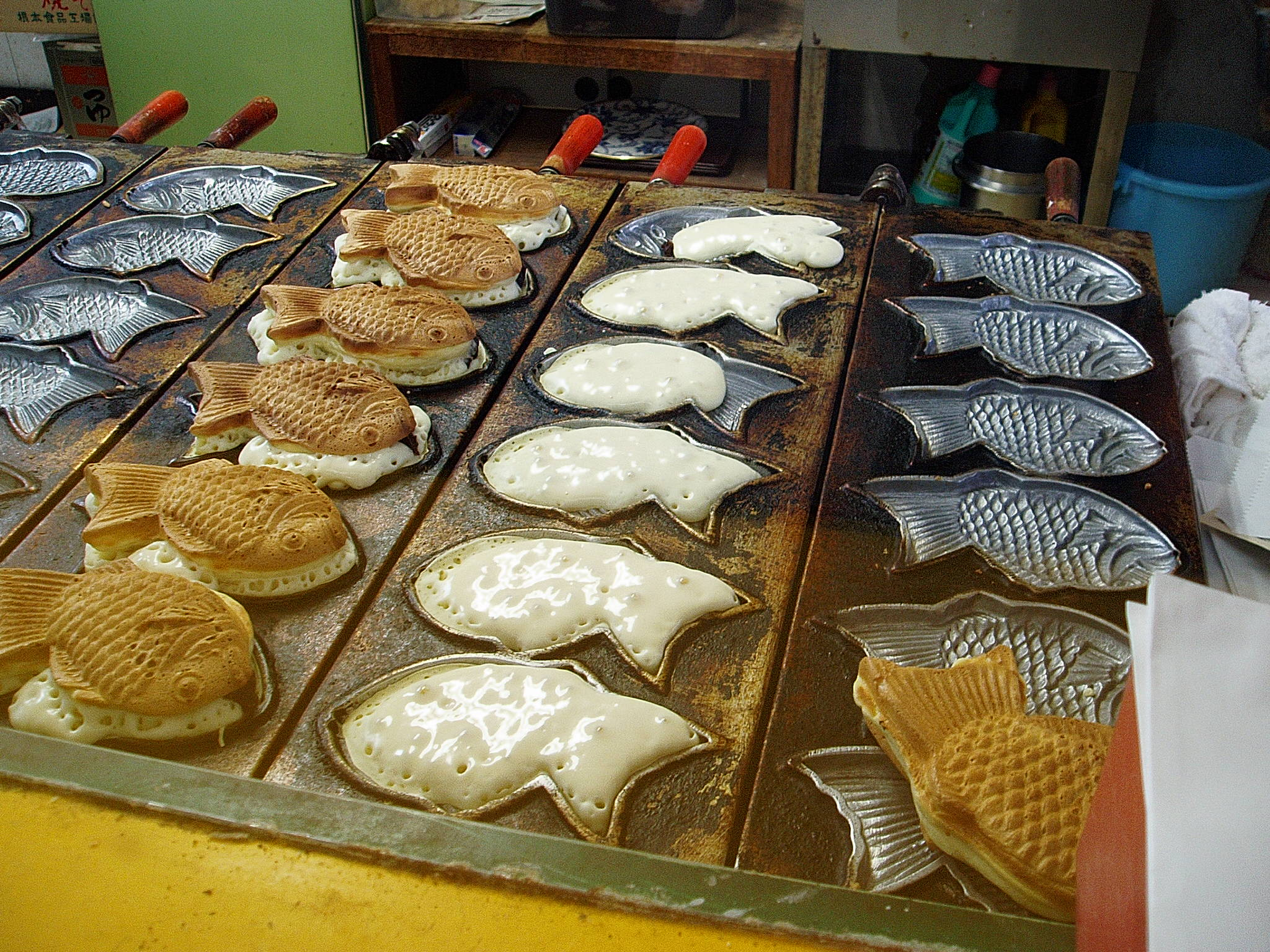
Before the line abolished, sold fish-shaped pancale filled with sweet bean paste in the station building and ran the shop till August 2011

== Surrounding area ==
- Shin-Hokota Station
- Kantetsu Green Bus Hokota office

== Buses ==
- There is a bus terminal.

Name	Via	Destination	Company	Note
Kashitetsu Bus	Tamatsukuri Station・Ogawa Station ・Shikamura Station	Ishioka Station	Kantetsu Green Bus	
Takahama Line	Kamiyama・Kamiyozawa・Ogawa Station・Takahama Station	Ishioka Station	Kantetsu Green Bus	
Takahama Line	Kamiyama・Kamiyozawa・Ogawa Station・Takahama Station	Ishioka Shako	Kantetsu Green Bus	
Takahama Line	Ōwada・Kamiyozawa・Ogawa Station・Takahama Station	Ishioka Station	Kantetsu Green Bus	
Takahama Line	Ōwada・Kamiyozawa・Ogawa Station	Takahama Station	Kantetsu Green Bus	
Ōwada Line	Ōwada・Okunotani・Kencho mae	Mito Station	Kantetsu Green Bus	
Ebisawa Line	Hokota Nōgyō Highschool・Ebisawa・Okunotani・Kencho mae	Mito Station	Kantetsu Green Bus	
	Hokota Shiyakusho	Shin-Hokota Station	Kantetsu Green Bus	
Airport bus	Non stop	Ibaraki Airport	Kantetsu Green Bus	
Express Bus	Takada・Kitaura-Shosya	Asō chosya	Kantetsu Green Bus	Runs only one route-trip on weekdays
Highway Bus ASŌ	Itako Station・Sawara Station	Tokyo Station	Kantetsu Green Bus	

== History ==
- 16 May 1929 - This station was opened as a station of 鹿島参宮鉄道-Kashima Sangū Railway
- 1 April 1939 - This station moved the station to urban area where was presently place.
- 1 June 1965 - 鹿島参宮鉄道-Kashima Sangū Railway 常総筑波鉄道-Jōsō Tsukuba Railway was merged into the former Kanto Railway。
- 1979 ‐ This station had belonged to Kashima Railway Line because Kanto Railway Hokota Line was split into Kashima Railway。
- 2000 - This station was selected as「関東の駅百選」
- 2007 - Abolition

== Adjacent stations ==
«	Service	»
Kashima Railway Line
Sakado Station (Ibaraki)		Terminus
