= Green Bus =

Green Bus may refer to:

- Green Bus Lines, in New York, U.S.
- Chiba Green Bus, Chiba Prefecture, Japan
- Kantetsu Green Bus, Ibaraki Prefecture, Japan
- The Green Bus, Birmingham, Great Britain
