= Iwama Station =

Railway station in Kasama, Ibaraki prefecture, Japan

Iwama Station 岩間駅
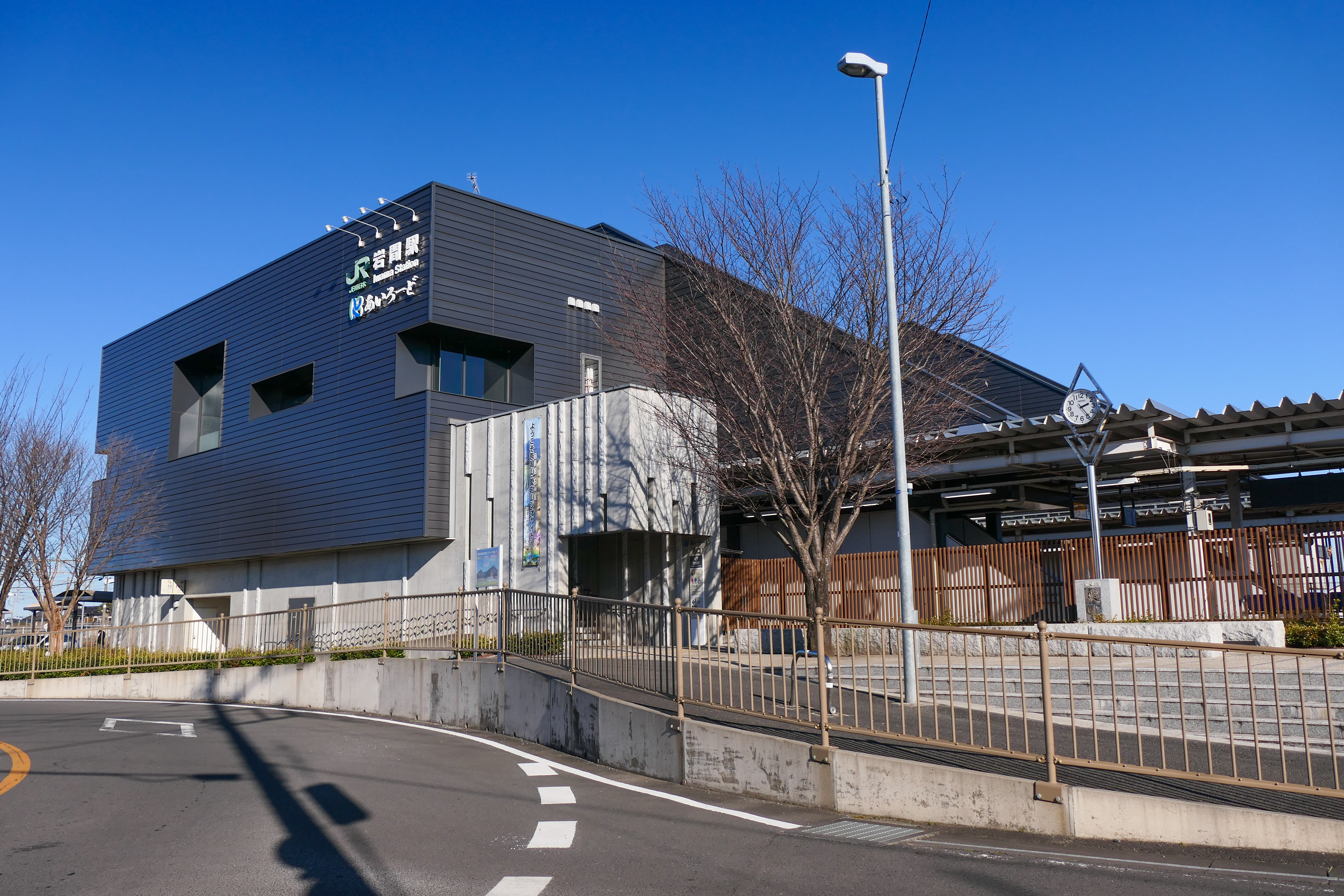
- Iwama Station, January 2022

General information
- Location: Shimogo 4439, Kasama-shi, Ibaraki-ken 319-0202; Japan
- Coordinates: 36.2955°N 140.2767°E
- Operator: JR East
- Line: ■ Jōban Line
- Distance: 91.9 km from Nippori
- Platforms: 2 side platforms

Other information
- Status: Staffed
- Website: Official website

History
- Opened: 4 November 1895

Passengers
- FY2019: 1312 daily

Services
Preceding station	JR East	Following station
Hatori towards Shinagawa	Jōban Line Local-Futsuu	Tomobe towards Sendai
Location
- Location within Ibaraki Prefecture Location within Japan

Iwama Station (岩間駅, Iwama-eki) is a passenger railway station located in the city of Kasama, Ibaraki Prefecture, Japan operated by the East Japan Railway Company (JR East).

== Lines ==
Iwama Station is served by the Jōban Line, and is located 91.9 km from the official starting point of the line at Nippori Station.

== Station layout ==
The station consists of two opposed side platforms, connected to the station building by a footbridge. The station is staffed. Two local trains stop approximately every hour during the day.

=== Platforms ===
1	■ Jōban Line	for Tomobe, Mito, Katsuta, Takahagi and Iwaki
2	■ Jōban Line ( Ueno-Tokyo Line)	for Ishioka, Tsuchiura, Toride, Ueno, Tokyo and Shinagawa

== History ==
Iwama Station was opened on 4 November 1895. The station was absorbed into the JR East network upon the privatization of the Japanese National Railways (JNR) on 1 April 1987. A new station building was completed in July 2012.

== Passenger statistics ==
In fiscal 2019, the station was used by an average of 1312 passengers daily (boarding passengers only).

== Surrounding area ==
- former Iwama Town Hall
- Iwama Post Office

== See also ==
- List of railway stations in Japan
