= Sakado Station =

Sakado Station is the name of multiple train stations in Japan.

- Sakado Station (Saitama) - (坂戸駅) in Saitama Prefecture
- Sakado Station (Fukuoka) - (酒殿駅) in Fukuoka Prefecture
- Sakado Station (Ibaraki) - (坂戸駅) in Ibaraki Prefecture (closed 2007)
