= Kashima Railway Line =

Former railway line in Ibaraki, Japan

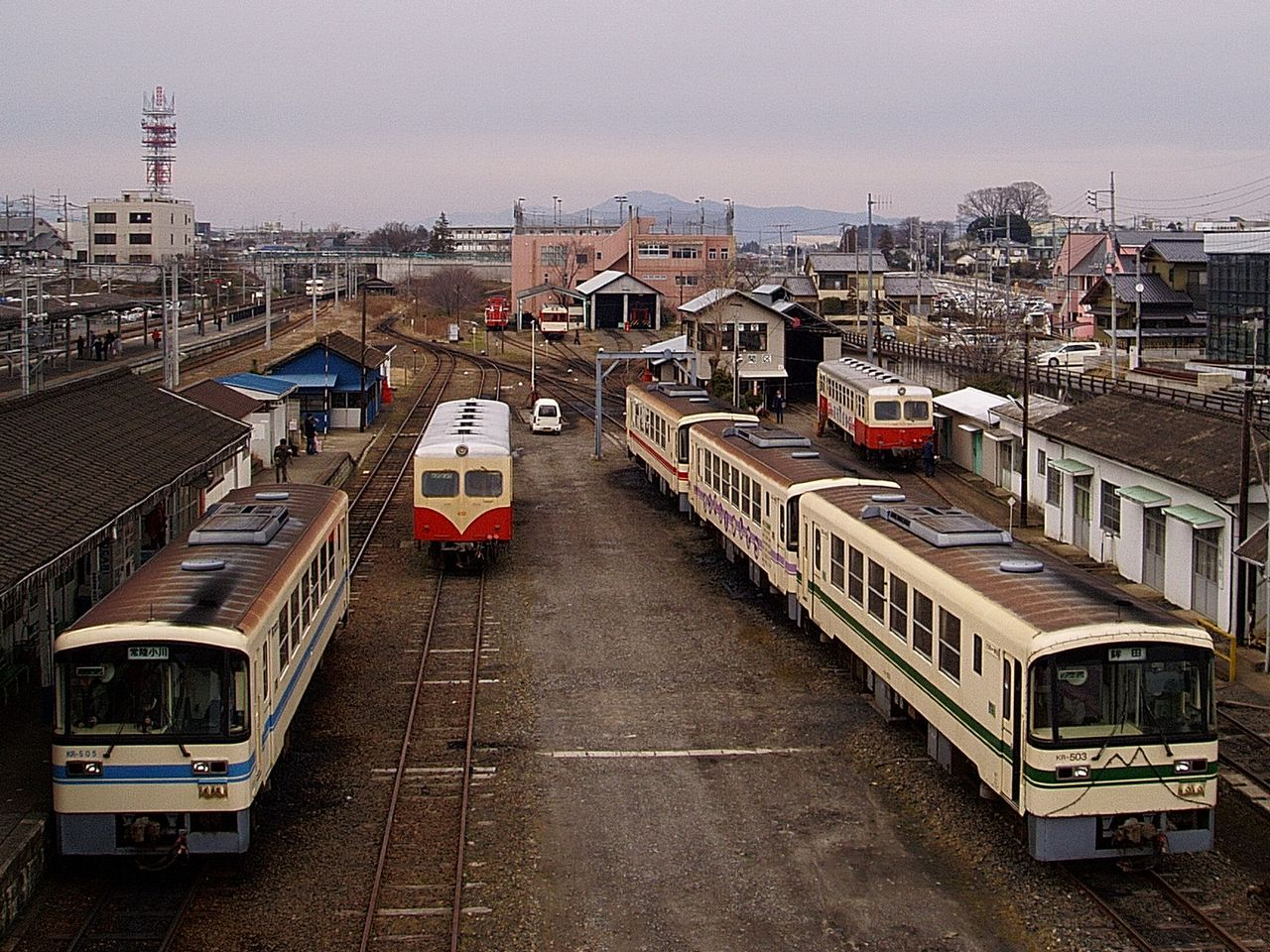
- Railcars of Kashima Railway at Ishioka Station, January 2007

Overview
- Status: Closed
- Owner: Kashima Railway Company
- Locale: Ibaraki Prefecture
- Termini: Ishioka; Hokota
- Stations: 17

Service
- Depot(s): Ishioka

History
- Opened: 8 June 1924
- Closed: 31 March 2007

Technical
- Line length: 27.2 km (16.9 mi)
- Number of tracks: Single
- Track gauge: 1,067 mm (3 ft 6 in)
- Minimum radius: 300 m
- Electrification: None
- Operating speed: 70 km/h (45 mph)

The Kashima Railway Line (鹿島鉄道線, Kashima Tetsudōsen) was the sole line operated by the Kashima Railway Company in Ibaraki Prefecture, Japan. It operated between Ishioka Station and Hokota Station. It closed on 31 March 2007.

== Stations ==
The line had 17 stations as shown below. As of 2002, only two stations, Ishioka and Hitachi-Ogawa, were staffed.

Station name	Japanese	Date opened	Distance (km)	Transfers	Location
Ishioka	石岡	8 June 1924	0.0	Jōban Line	Ishioka, Ibaraki
Ishioka-Minamidai	石岡南台	16 June 1987	1.5		Ishioka, Ibaraki
Higashi-Tanaka	東田中	18 November 1964	2.5		Ishioka, Ibaraki
Tamari	玉里	1 November 1951	3.6		Omitama, Ibaraki
Shin-Takahama	新高浜	8 June 1924	4.2		Omitama, Ibaraki
Shikamura	四箇村	1 October 1951	5.1		Omitama, Ibaraki
Hitachi-Ogawa	常陸小川	8 June 1924	7.1		Omitama, Ibaraki
Ogawakōkō-shita	小川高校下	1 April 1988	7.8		Omitama, Ibaraki
Momoura	桃浦	15 August 1926	10.7		Namegata, Ibaraki
Yakimaki	八木蒔	1 October 1951	12.8		Namegata, Ibaraki
Hama	浜	15 August 1926	14.4		Namegata, Ibaraki
Tamatsukurimachi	玉造町	1 February 1928	15.8		Namegata, Ibaraki
Enokimoto	榎本	6 May 1929	19.5		Namegata, Ibaraki
Kariyado-mae	借宿前	1 October 1951	21.4		Hokota, Ibaraki
Tomoegawa	巴川	16 April 1929	23.7		Hokota, Ibaraki
Sakado	坂戸	19 November 1956	25.0		Hokota, Ibaraki
Hokota	鉾田	6 May 1929	27.1		Hokota, Ibaraki

== History ==
The line first opened on 8 June 1924 as the steam-operated Kashima Sangu Railway (鹿島参宮鉄道), using steam operation between Ishioka and Hitachi-Ogawa. The full line to Hokota was opened on 16 May 1929.

Diesel operation commenced on 6 September 1930.

From 1 June 1965, the railway became the Kantō Railway Hokota Line, and from 1 April 1979, it became the separate Kashima Railway.

Freight operations ceased in 2002.

In 2006, the company announced the planned closure of the line, and the line finally closed on 31 March 2007.

The section between Ishioka and Shikamura stations was replaced with a BRT in August 2010.
