= Hatori Station =

Railway station in Omitama, Ibaraki Prefecture, Japan

Hatori Station 羽鳥駅
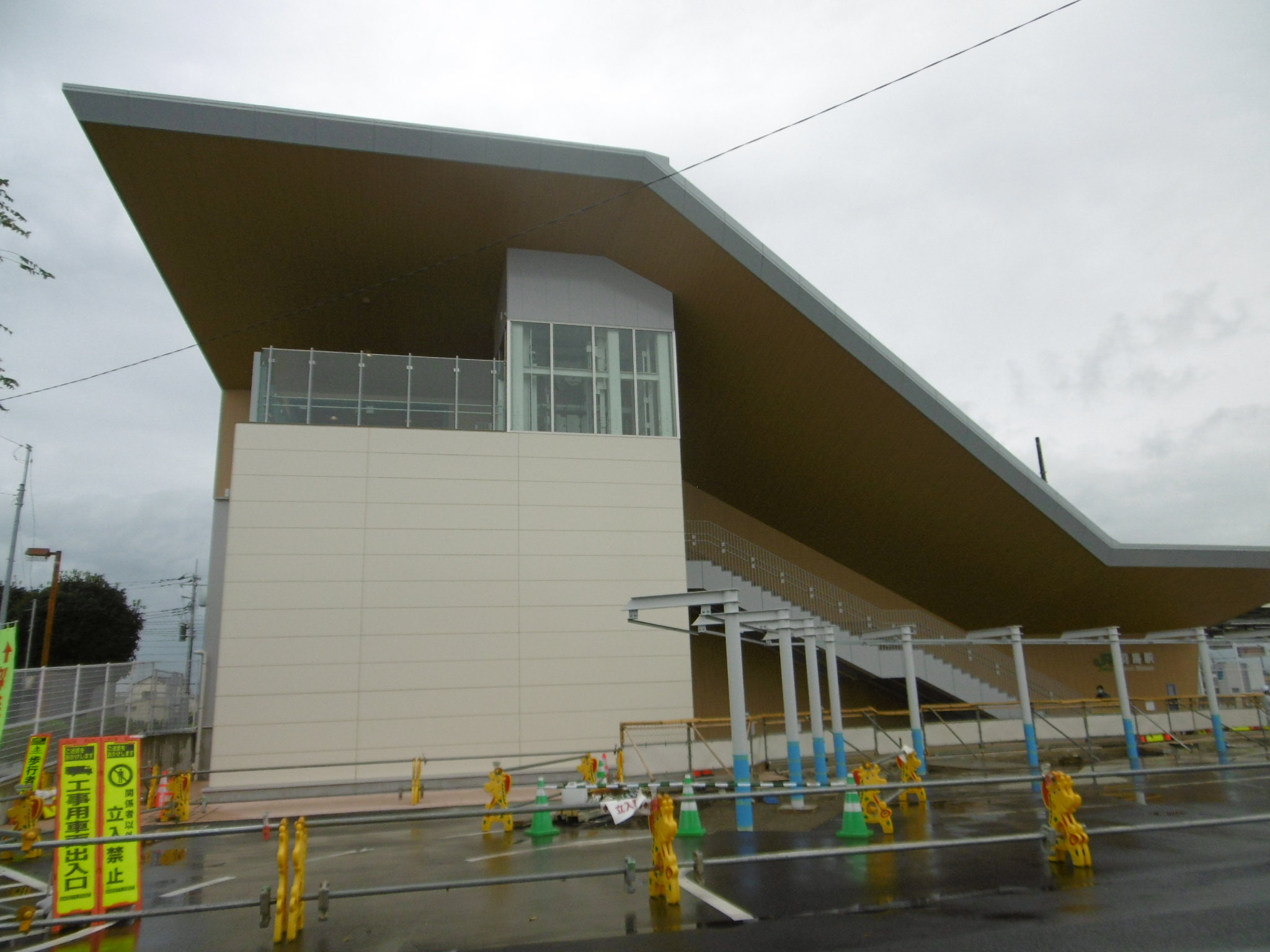
- Hatori Station, September 2020

General information
- Location: 2665 Hatori, Omitama-shi, Ibaraki-ken 319-0123; Japan
- Coordinates: 36.2472°N 140.2873°E
- Operator: JR East
- Line: ■ Jōban Line
- Distance: 86.5 km from Nippori
- Platforms: 1 side + 1 island platform

Other information
- Status: Staffed
- Website: Official website

History
- Opened: 1 December 1895

Passengers
- FY2019: 2290 daily

Services
Preceding station	JR East	Following station
Ishioka towards Shinagawa	Jōban Line Local-Futsu	Iwama towards Sendai
Location
- Location within Ibaraki Prefecture Location within Japan

Hatori Station (羽鳥駅, Hatori-eki) is a passenger railway station located in the city of Omitama, Ibaraki Prefecture, Japan operated by the East Japan Railway Company (JR East).

== Lines ==
Hatori Station is served by the Jōban Line, and is located 86.5 km from the official starting point of the line at Nippori Station. Two local trains stop approximately every hour during the day.

== Station layout ==
The station has one side platform and one island platform, connected to the station building by a footbridge. The station is staffed.

=== Platforms ===
1	■ Jōban Line	for Tomobe, Mito, Katsuta, Takahagi and Iwaki
2, 3	■ Jōban Line ( Ueno-Tokyo Line)	for Ishioka, Tsuchiura, Toride, Ueno, Tokyo and Shinagawa

== History ==
Hatori Station was opened on 1 December 1895. The station was absorbed into the JR East network upon the privatization of the Japanese National Railways (JNR) on 1 April 1987.

== Passenger statistics ==
In fiscal 2019, the station was used by an average of 2290 passengers daily (boarding passengers only).

== Surrounding area ==
- Japan National Route 355
- Hatori Post Office

== See also ==
- List of railway stations in Japan
