= Sakado Station (Ibaraki) =

Former railway station in Hokota, Ibaraki Prefecture, Japan

Coordinates: 36°9′18.6″N 140°29′8.4″E

Sakado Station 坂戸駅
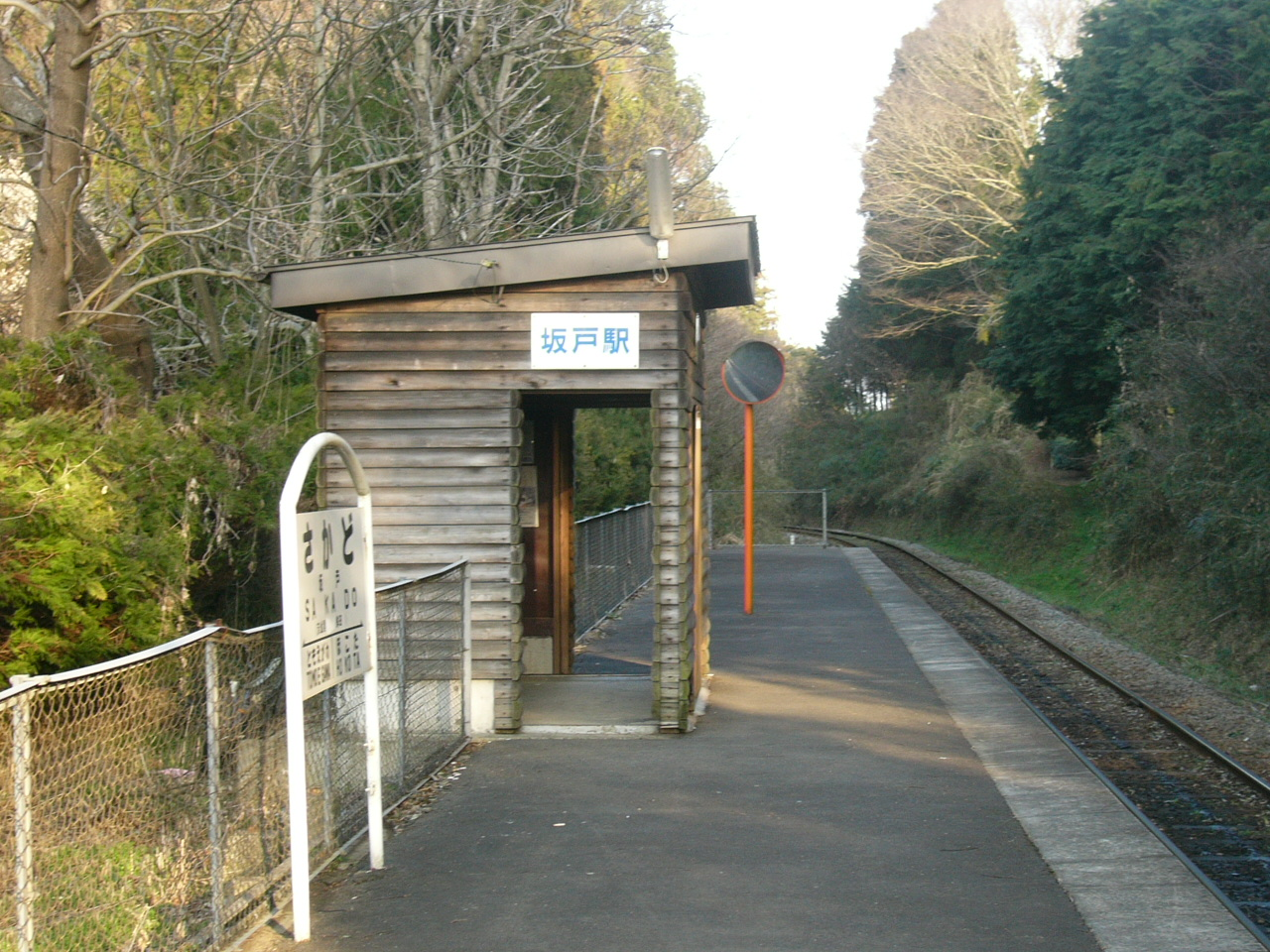
- Sakado Station, March 2006

General information
- Location: Hokota, Ibaraki; Japan
- Operator: Kashima Railway
- Line: Kashima Railway Line

History
- Opened: 1956
- Closed: 2007

Passengers
- FY2000: 68 daily
Location

Sakado Station (坂戸駅, Sakado-eki) was a railway station on the Kashima Railway Line in Hokota, Ibaraki, Japan. Opened in 1956, it closed when the line was closed on 31 March 2007.

== Lines ==
Sakado Station was served by the 27.1 km (16.8 mi) single-track Kashima Railway Line from Ishioka to Hokota. It was located between Tomoegawa and Hokota stations, and was a distance of 25.0 rail km from Ishioka Station.

== Station layout ==
The unstaffed station consisted of one side platform serving a single track.

== History ==
Sakado Station opened on 19 November 1956. It closed on 31 March 2007 when the entire line was closed.

== Passenger statistics ==
In fiscal 2000, the station was used by an average of 68 passengers daily.

== Surrounding area ==
- Hokota Park
- Hotpark Hokota

== Adjacent stations ==
«	Service	»
Kashima Railway Line
Tomoegawa		Hokota
