= Shin-Hokota Station =

Railway station in Hokota, Ibaraki Prefecture, Japan

Shin-Hokota Station 新鉾田駅
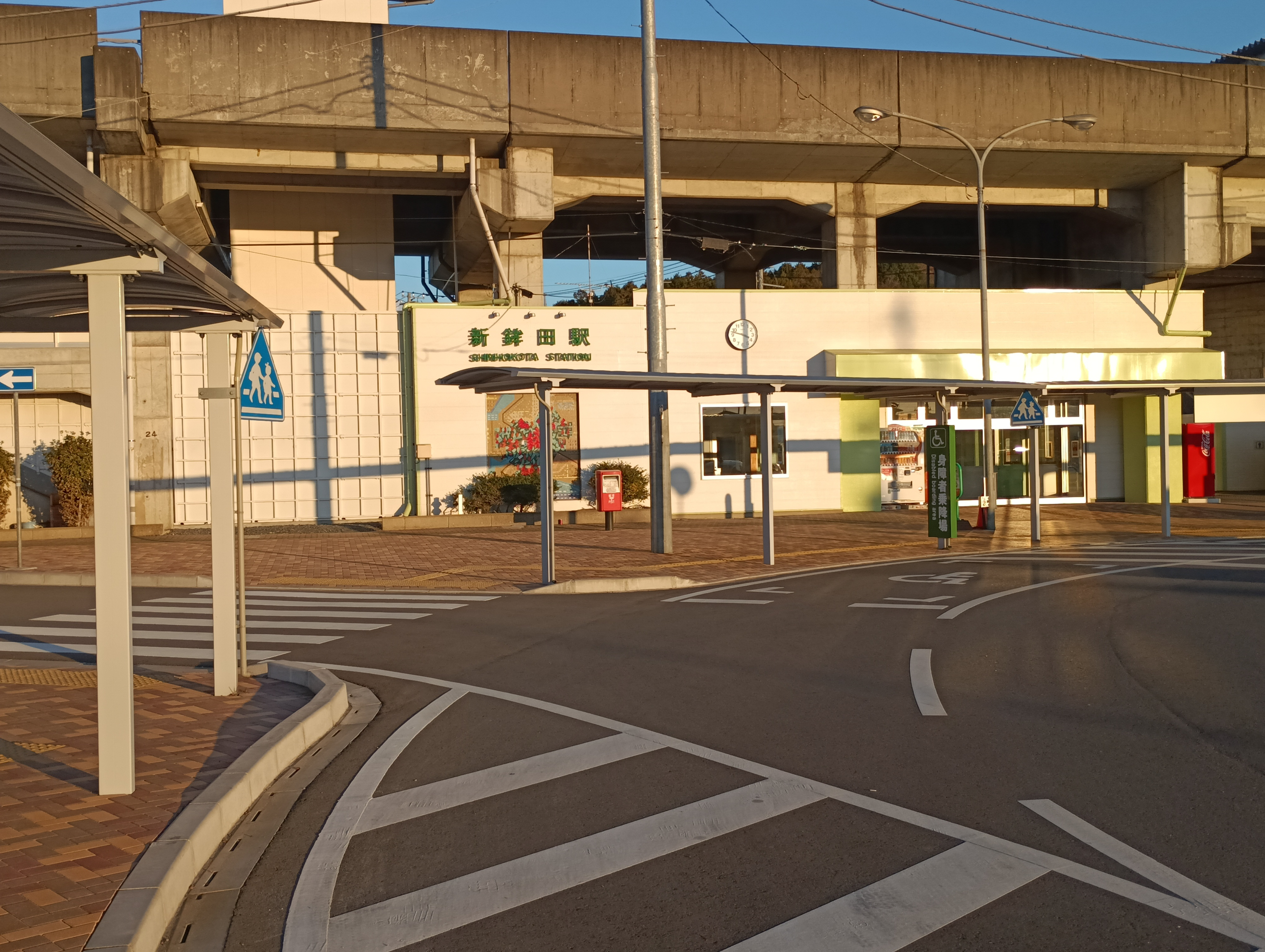
- Shin-Hokota Station, december 2025

General information
- Location: Shin-Hokota 1-837-3, Hokota-shi, Ibaraki-ken 311-1516; Japan
- Coordinates: 36.1531°N 140.5207°E
- Operator: Kashima Rinkai Tetsudo
- Line: ■ Ōarai-Kashima Line
- Distance: 31.0 km from Mito
- Platforms: 2 (1 island platform)
- Connections: Bus terminal

Construction
- Structure type: Elevated

Other information
- Status: Staffed
- Website: Official website

History
- Opened: 14 March 1985

Passengers
- FY2015: 1485 daily

Services
Preceding station	Kashima Rinkai Railway	Following station
Tokushuku towards Mito	Ōarai Kashima Line	Kitaurakohan towards Kashimajingū
Location
- Location within Ibaraki Prefecture Location within Japan

Shin-Hokota Station (新鉾田駅, Shin-Hokota-eki) is a passenger railway station in the town of Hokota, Ibaraki Prefecture, Japan operated by the third sector Kashima Rinkai Railway.

== Lines ==
Shin-Hokota Station is served by the Kashima Rinkai Railway’s Ōarai Kashima Line, and is located 31.0 km from the official starting point of the line at Mito Station.

== Station layout ==
The station consists of a single elevated island platform with the station building underneath.

=== Platforms ===
1	■ Ōarai Kashima Line	for Kashimajingū
2	■ Ōarai Kashima Line	for Ōarai and Mito

== History ==
Shin-Hokota Station was opened on 14 March 1985 with the opening of the Ōarai Kashima Line.

== Passenger statistics ==
In fiscal 2015, the station was used by an average of 1485 passengers daily.

== Surrounding area ==
- Hokota City Hall
- Hokota Post Office

== Bus routes ==
- Kantetsu Green Bus
  - For Hokota Station, Ibaraki Airport and Ishioka Station
  - For Tokyo Station via Itako Station and Sawara Station
- Ibaraki Kotsu
  - For Narita Airport

== See also ==
- List of railway stations in Japan
