= Funazukayama Kofun =

Japanese burial mound

- 舟塚山古墳 (Japanese)
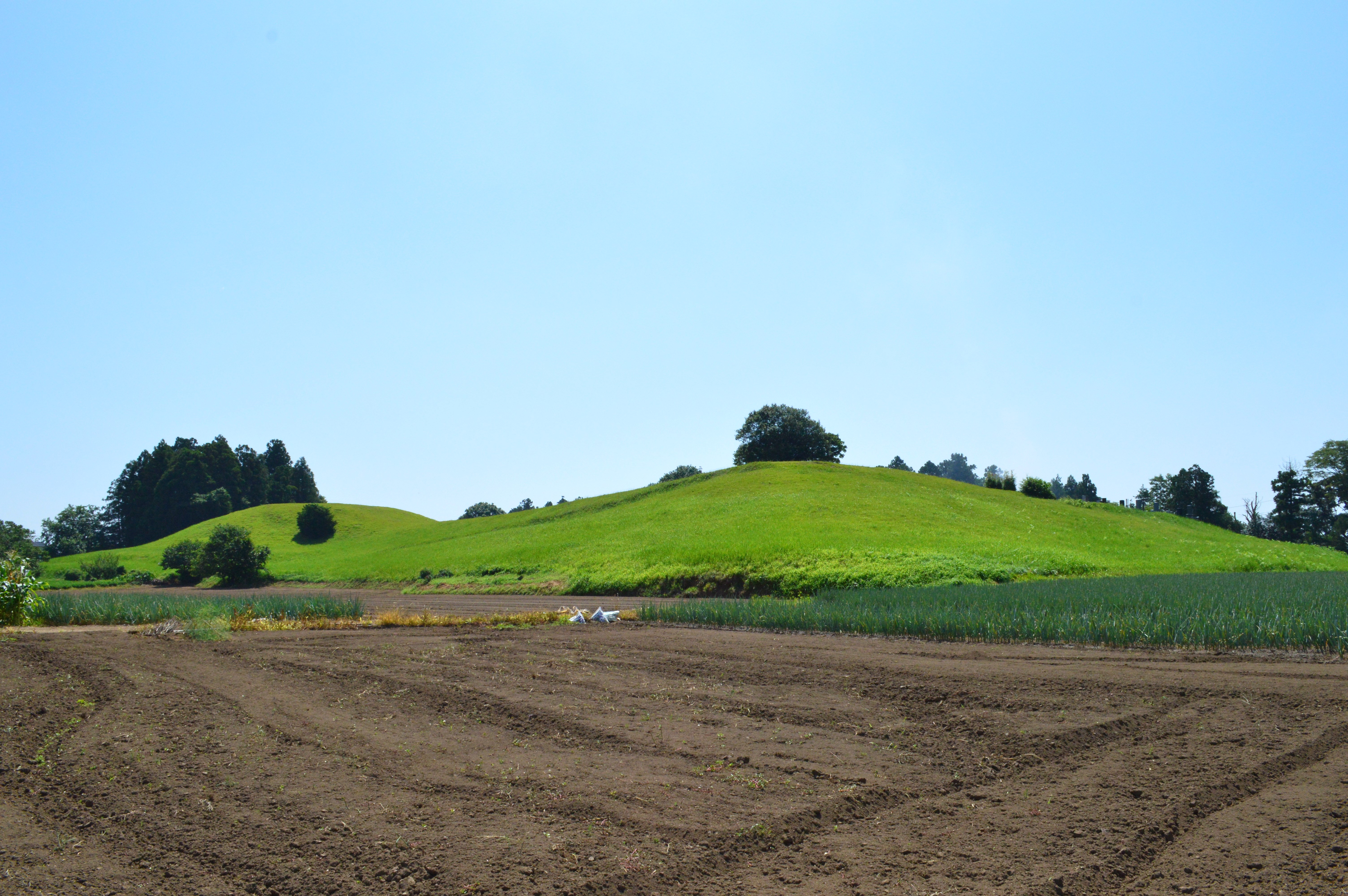
- Funazukayama Kofun

- Funazukayama Kofun Funazukayama Kofun (Japan)
- 36°10′3.83″N 140°17′22.66″E
- Type: kofun
- Periods: Kofun period
- Location: Ishioka, Ibaraki, Japan
- Region: Kantō region

History
- Built: mid 5th century AD

Site notes
- Elevation: 10 m (33 ft)
- Length: 186 m (610 ft)
- Excavation dates: 1963, 1972
- Public access: Yes (public park)
- National Historic Site of Japan

The Funazukayama Kofun (舟塚山古墳) is a large Kofun period burial mound located in the Kitanemoto neighborhood of the city of Ishioka, Ibaraki in the northern Kantō region of Japan. The tumulus was designated a National Historic Site in 1921. It is the largest in Ibaraki Prefecture and the second largest in the Kantō region after the Ōta Tenjinyama Kofun in Ōta, Gunma.

== Overview ==
The Funazukayama Kofun is located on the edge of a plateau on the northern coast of Lake Kasumigaura. It has a total length of 186 meters and is orientated to the west. The tumulus was constructed in three tiers, with rows of cylindrical haniwa, but neither figurative haniwa nor fukiishi have not been discovered. It was surrounded by a shield-shaped moat on all sides except the south, which give the tumulus a total length of 260 meters if the moats are considered as part of the length. It is part of a cluster of smaller tumuli in area, and is estimated to have been built around the latter half of the 5th century, or the middle of the Kofun period. As the surrounding area is also the location of the provincial capital of Hitachi Province during the Nara period, it is speculated that this kofun may have been the grave of the local Kuni no miyatsuko or local king during the earlier Kofun period.

The tumulus has undergone some changes in its configuration due to the encroachment of a Shinto shrine on its grounds, and the mining of the tumulus for soil by local farmers; and it is possible that it was robbed in premodern times, as local legends state that many swords have been uncovered in the area. The tumulus was surveyed by Meiji University in 1963. In 1972, an archaeological excavation found a number of grave goods, including a straight iron sword and shield, but no burial chamber was discovered. It was re-examined from 2011 to 2013 with ground-penetrating radar. The tumulus is located a ten-minute walk from Takahama Station on the JR East Jōban Line.

Total length
186 meters
Anterior rectangular portion
99 meters wide x 10 meters high
Posterior circular portion
90 meter diameter x 11 meters high

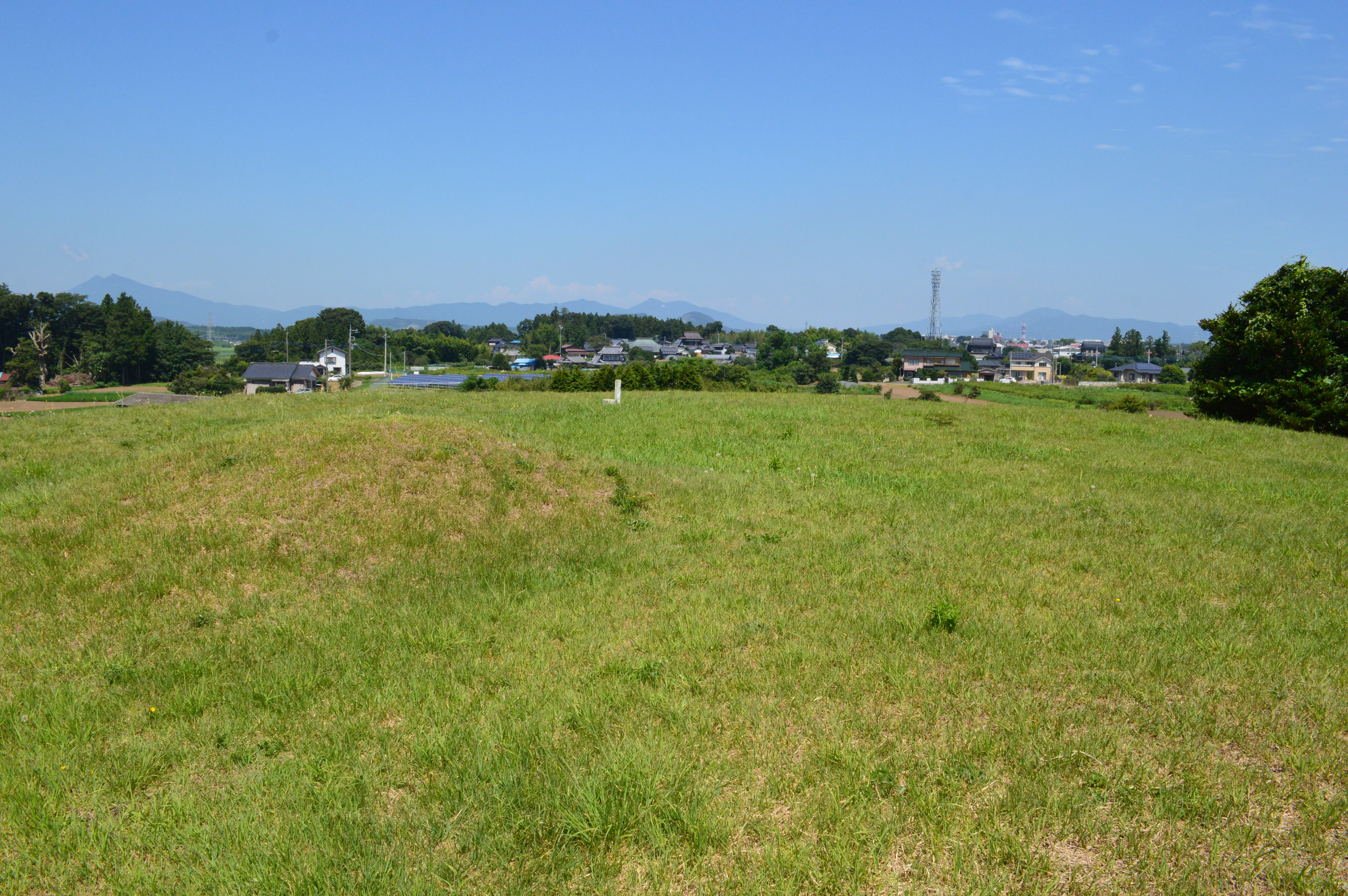
Overview

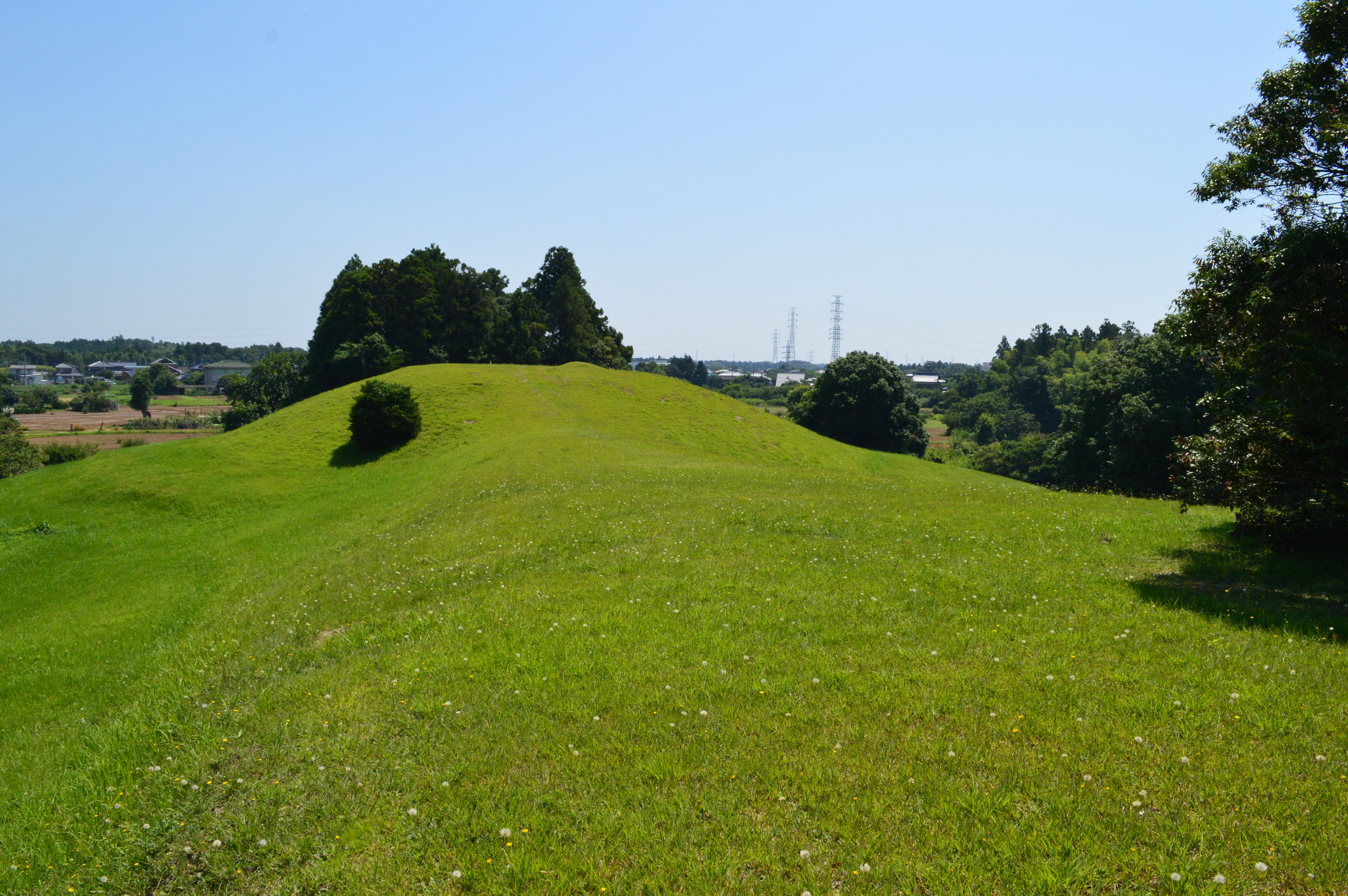
For anterior towards posterior

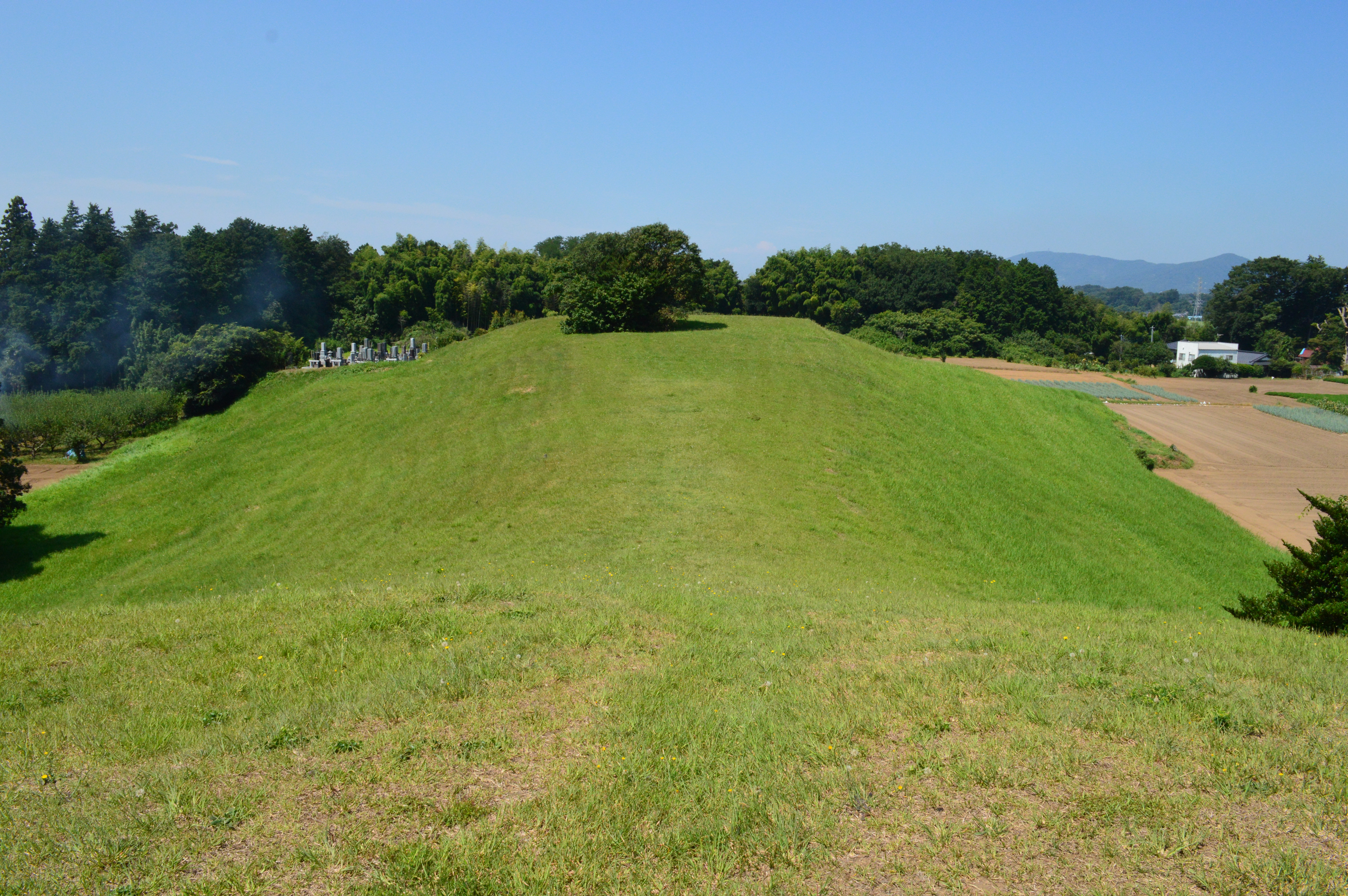
From posterior towards anterior

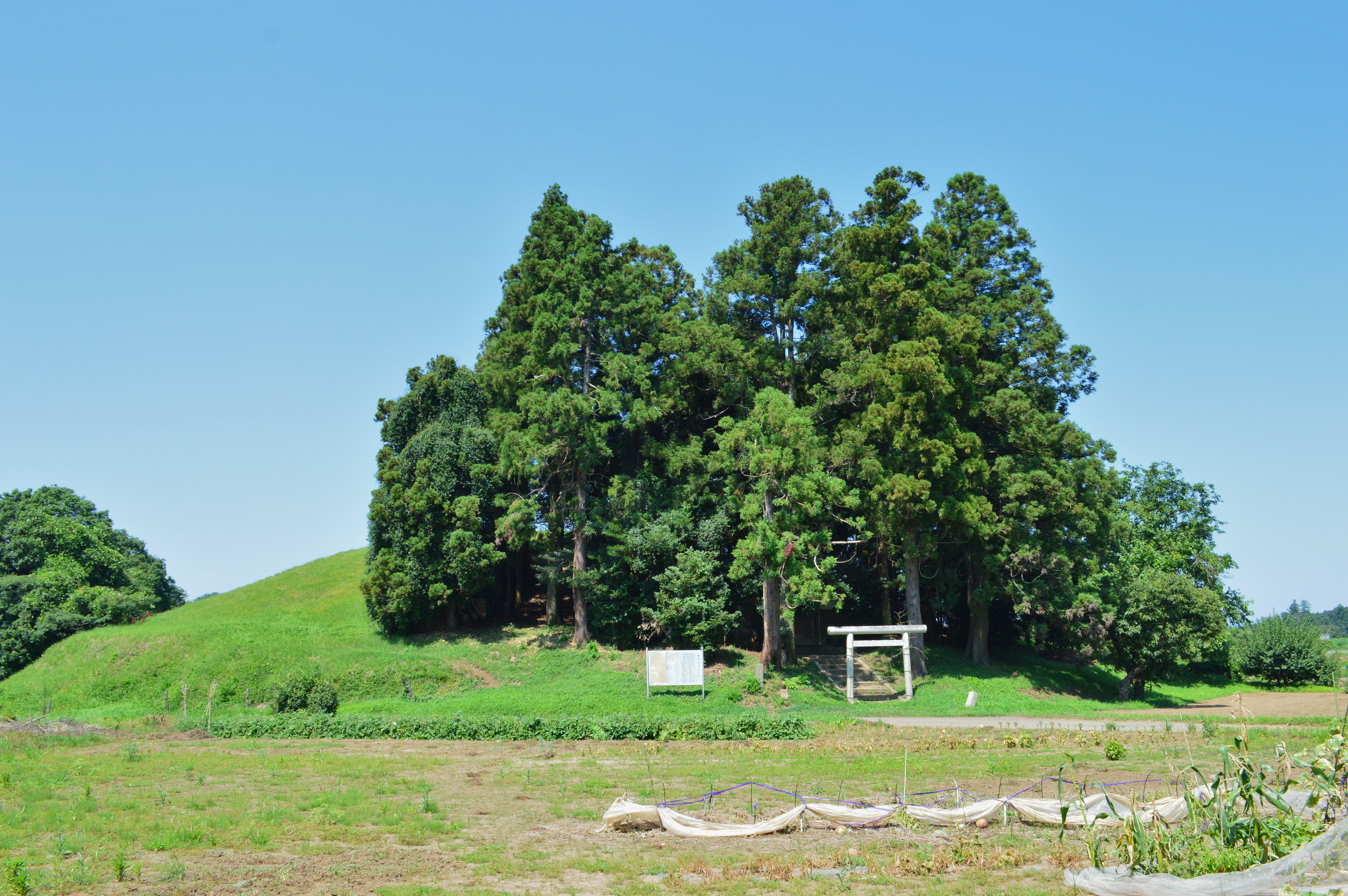
Posterior circula portion

== See also ==
- List of Historic Sites of Japan (Ibaraki)
