= Ishioka =

Ishioka 石岡市
- City
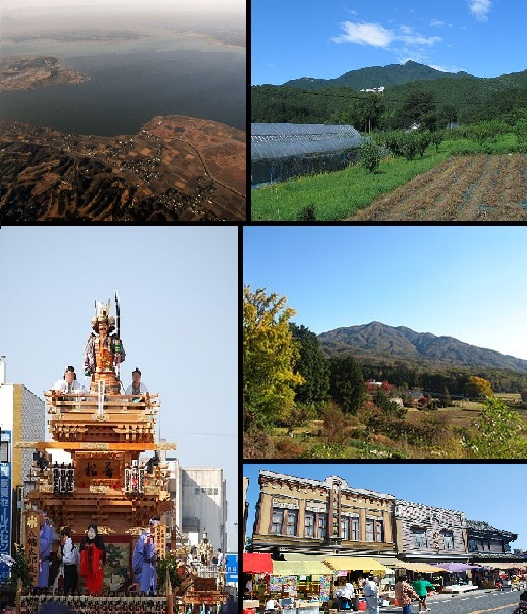
- Upper: Lake Kasumigaura, Mt Tsukuba; Middle: Ishioka festival, Mt Kabasan, lower: Ishioka street scene

- Flag Seal

- Location of Ishioka in Ibaraki Prefecture

- Coordinates: 36°11′27″N 140°17′14″E
- Country: Japan
- Region: Kantō
- Prefecture: Ibaraki
- First official recorded: late 3rd century (official estimated)
- Town settled: April 1, 1889
- City settled: February 11, 1954

Government
  - Mayor: Kazuyuki Toita (戸井田和之) - from June 2026

Area
  - Total: 215.53 km^{2} (83.22 sq mi)

Population (January 2024)
  - Total: 70,124
  - Density: 325.36/km^{2} (842.67/sq mi)
- Time zone: UTC+9 (Japan Standard Time)
- Tree: Castanopsis
- Flower: Lilium
- Bird: Eurasian skylark
- Phone number: 0299-23-1111
- Address: 1-1-1 Ishioka, Ishioka-shi, Ibaraki-ken 315-8640
- Website: Official website

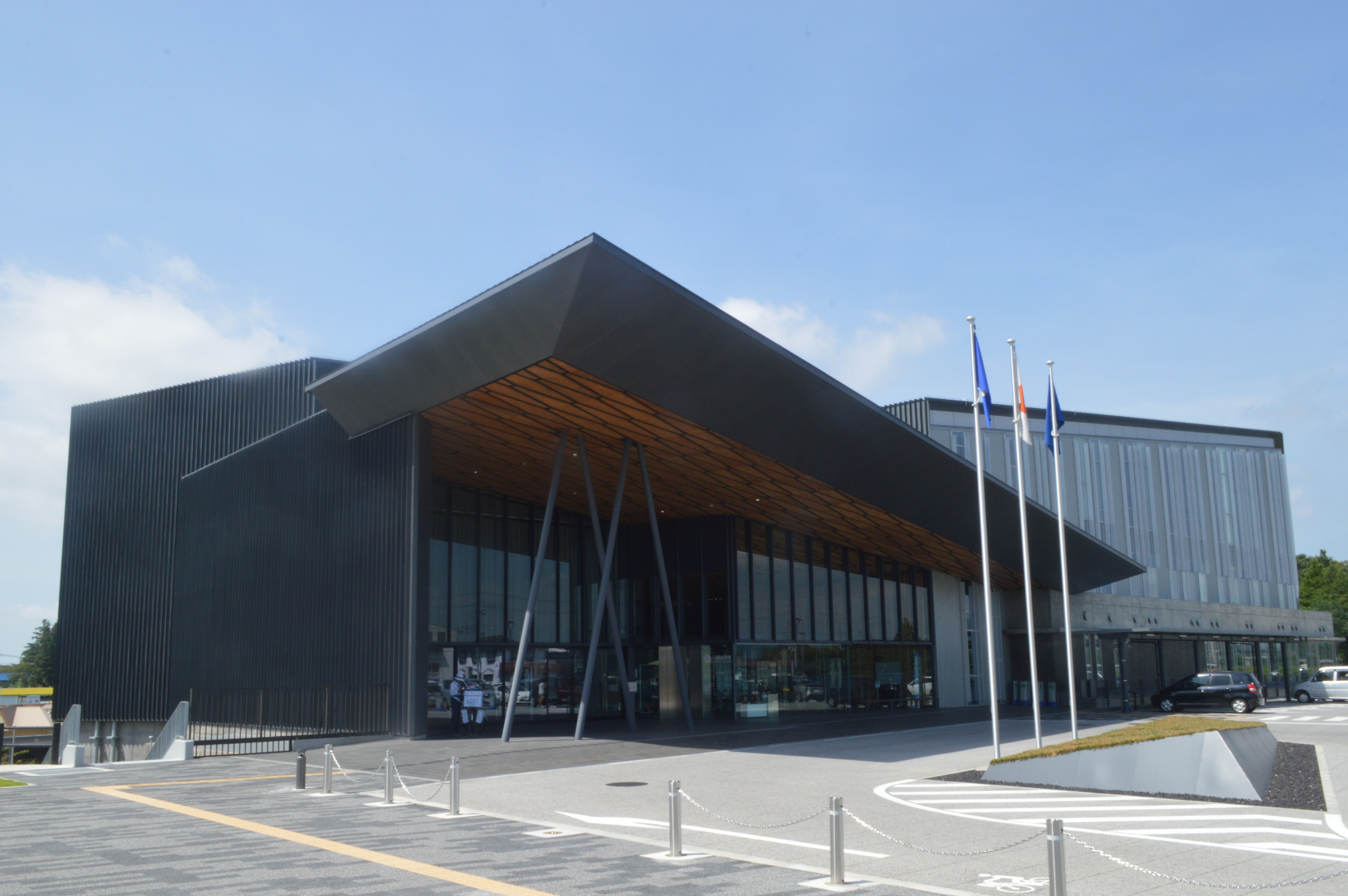
Ishioka City Hall

Ishioka (石岡市, Ishioka-shi; Japanese pronunciation: [ì.ɕí.ó̞.kä́(.ɕì)]) is a Japanese city located in Ibaraki Prefecture, Japan. As of 1 January 2024, the city had an estimated population of 70,124 in 28,892 households and a population density of 325 persons per km^{2}. The percentage of the population aged over 65 was 33.5%. The total area of the city is 215.53 square kilometres (83.22 sq mi).

== Geography ==
Ishioka is located in central Ibaraki Prefecture, approximately 70 kilometers north of central Tokyo. It is bordered by Lake Kasumigaura to the south and by mountains on all other sides. The urban area of the city is in the east.

=== Surrounding municipalities ===
Ibaraki Prefecture

- Kasama
- Kasumigaura
- Omitama
- Sakuragawa
- Tsuchiura
- Tsukuba

=== Climate ===
Ishioka has a humid subtropical climate (Köppen Cfa) characterized by warm summers and cool winters with light snowfall. The average annual temperature in Ishioka is 13.8 °C. The average annual rainfall is 1331 mm with September as the wettest month. The temperatures are highest on average in August, at around 25.8 °C, and lowest in January, at around 2.8 °C.

== Demographics ==
Per Japanese census data, the population of Ishioka peaked around the year 2000 and has declined since.

Historical population
| Year | Pop. | ±% |
|---|---|---|
| 1920 | 46,587 | — |
| 1930 | 51,907 | +11.4% |
| 1940 | 54,093 | +4.2% |
| 1950 | 68,962 | +27.5% |
| 1960 | 65,428 | −5.1% |
| 1970 | 66,941 | +2.3% |
| 1980 | 76,137 | +13.7% |
| 1990 | 80,035 | +5.1% |
| 2000 | 83,119 | +3.9% |
| 2010 | 79,687 | −4.1% |
| 2020 | 73,061 | −8.3% |

== History ==
During the Nara period, the provincial capital of Hitachi Province was located in what is now part of the city of Ishioka. The area was known as Hitachi-Fuchū (常陸府中), or simply as "Fuchū" for most of history and developed as a castle town during the Edo period for Hitachi-Fuchū Domain. The domain was renamed "Ishioka Domain" in 1869. With the establishment of the modern municipalities system on April 1, 1889 after the Meiji restoration, the town of Ishioka was created. Much of the town was destroyed in a fire on March 14, 1929.

Ishioka was raised to city status on February 11, 1954. The new city annexed the neighboring villages of Mi and Sekigawa on December 1, 1954. On October 1, 2005, the town of Yasato (from Niihari District) was merged into Ishioka.

== Government ==
Ishioka has a mayor-council form of government with a directly elected mayor and a unicameral city council of 22 members. Ishioka contributes two members to the Ibaraki Prefectural Assembly. In terms of national politics, the city is part of Ibaraki 1st district of the lower house of the Diet of Japan.

== Economy ==
Ishioka has a diverse economy. Agriculture includes lotus roots, which are cultivated around Lake Kasumigaura, tobacco, and horticulture, such as persimmons, mandarin oranges, and strawberries cultivated at the foot of Mount Tsukuba. In addition, the countryside is one of the leading rice areas in Ibaraki prefecture. Pig farming, chicken farming, and dairy farming are also major agricultural contributors. The city has an industrial park, with factories owned by Panasonic and Toyo Seikan, among others. Sake brewing is a traditional local industry, as is the manufacturing of incense sticks.

== Education ==
Ishioka has 17 public elementary schools, eight public middle schools operated by the city government, and three public high schools operated by the Ibaraki Prefectural Board of Education. There is also one private middle school and one private high school.

== Transportation ==
=== Railway ===
JR East – Jōban Line

- Takahama – Ishioka

=== Highway ===
- Jōban Expressway – Ishioka-Omitama Smart Interchange
- National Route 6
- National Route 355

== Local attractions ==
- Hitachinokuni Sōshagū Shinto shrine

=== National Historic Monuments ===
- site of Hitachi Kokubun-ji
- site of Hitachi Kokufu ruins
- Funazukayama Kofun
- Kawaratsuka kiln ruins
- Sakura Azumao Former Residence

== Notable people from Ishioka ==
- Inio Asano, manga artist
- Miya, musician and guitarist of Mucc
- Takao Watanabe, politician
- Yukke, musician and bassist of Mucc
