= Ibaraki Airport =

Ibaraki Airport · Hyakuri Airfield 茨城空港 · 百里飛行場
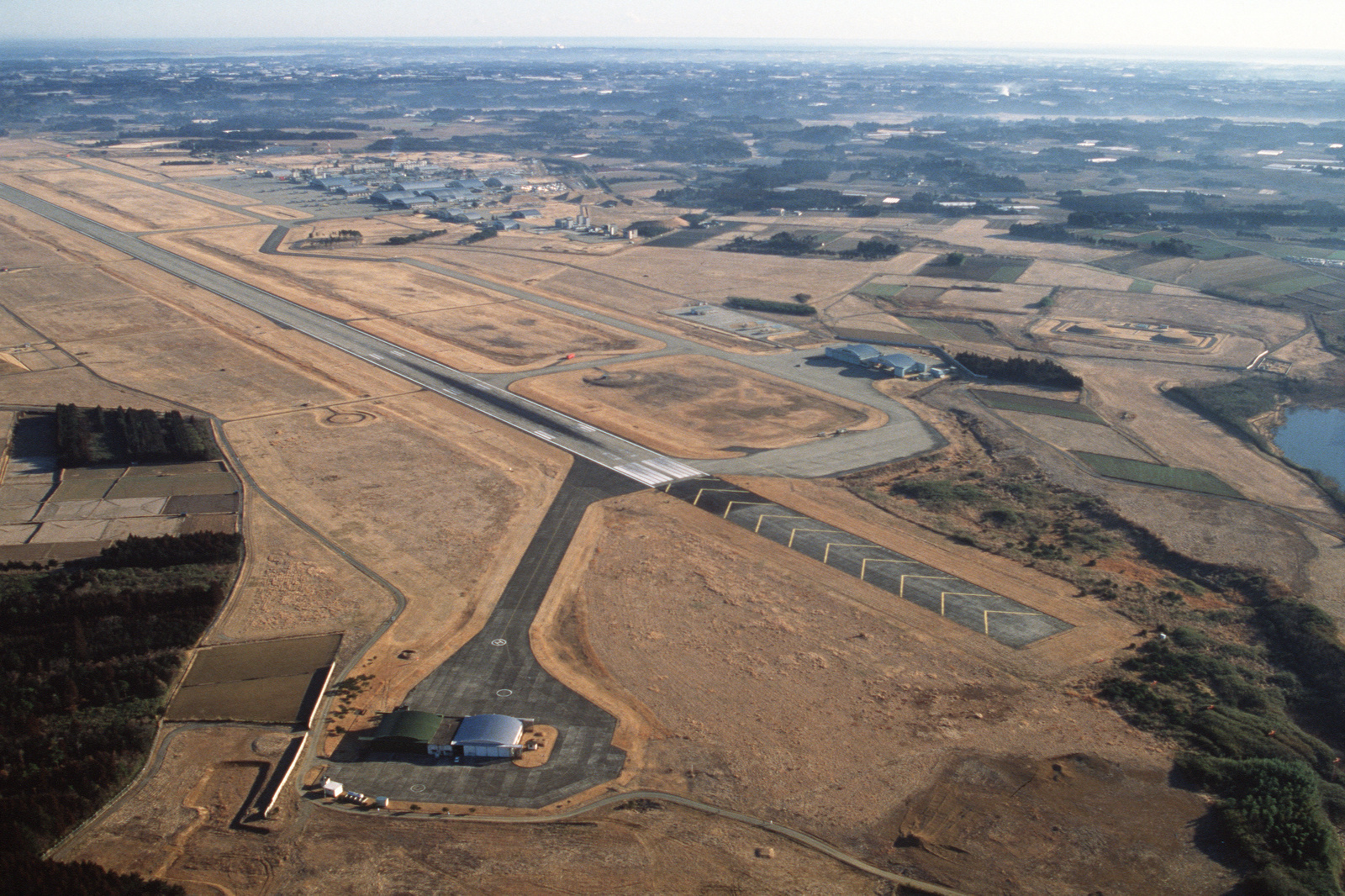
- IATA: IBR; ICAO: RJAH

Summary
- Airport type: Military/Public
- Operator: JASDF
- Serves: Mito, Japan
- Location: Omitama, Ibaraki, Japan
- Elevation AMSL: 107 ft (33 m)
- Coordinates: 36°10′54″N 140°24′53″E
- Website: Ibaraki Airport

Map
- Location in Japan IBR/RJAH (Japan)

Runways
Direction	Length		Surface
Direction	m	ft	Surface
03L/21R	2,700	8,858	Asphalt concrete
03R/21L	2,700	8,858	Concrete

Statistics (2015)
- Passengers: 538,227
- Cargo (metric tonnes): 300
- Aircraft movement: 4,992
- Source: Japanese Ministry of Land, Infrastructure, Transport and Tourism

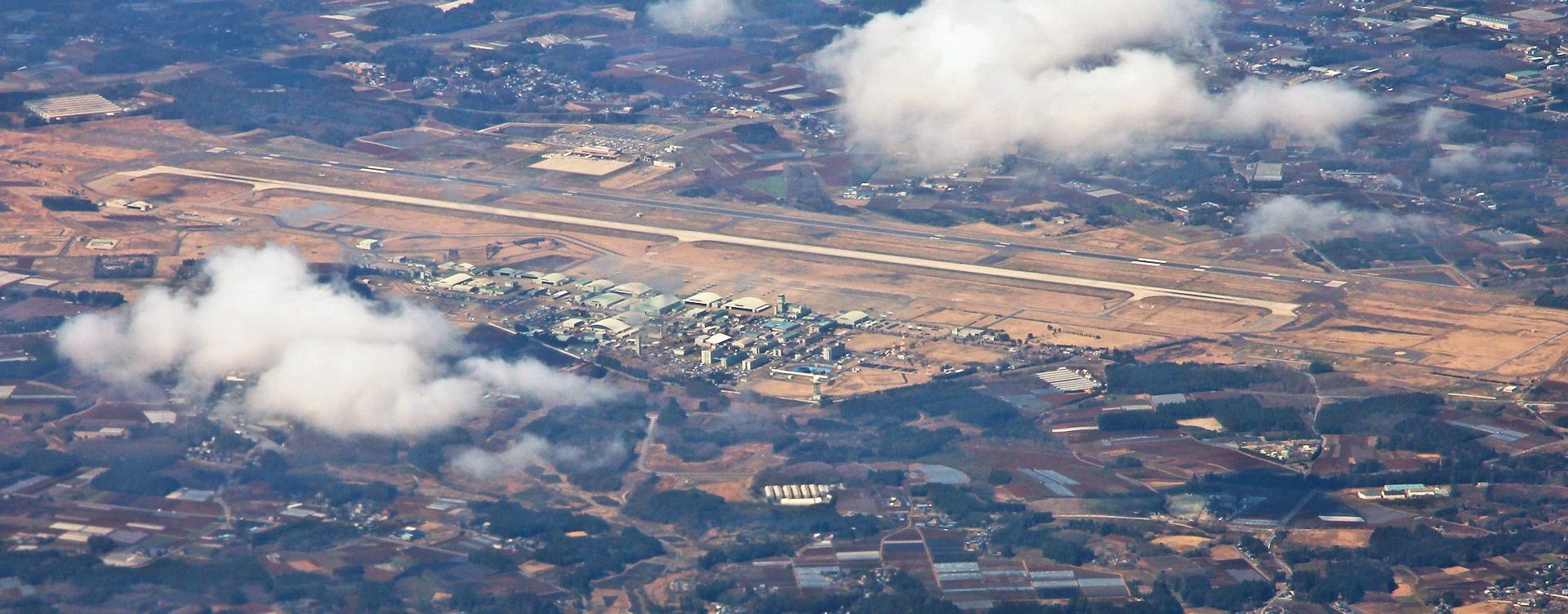
Aerial view of Ibaraki Airport

Location of Ibaraki Airport

Ibaraki Airport (茨城空港, Ibaraki Kūkō) is an airport in the city of Omitama, Ibaraki Prefecture, Japan. It also serves as an air base for the Japan Air Self-Defense Force (JASDF) under the name Hyakuri Air Base, and is the closest fighter base to Tokyo. The airport was known as Hyakuri Airfield (百里飛行場, Hyakuri Hikōjō) prior to March 2010, when civil aviation operations began.

The airport is located about 85 km (53 mi) north of Tokyo, and is intended to serve as a low-cost alternative to Tokyo's larger Narita and Haneda airports. Built as a result of large public investment, the airport has been criticized as being a symbol of wasteful government spending and as being unnecessary, opening with only one flight per day.

As of 2023, a total of eight routes operate from the airport, all by low-cost carriers. One advantage of Ibaraki is its closer access to Tsukuba Science City (via roadway), which has the highest concentration of technology firms in Japan. The airport currently has no advantage over Narita Airport in public transport into Tsukuba, with both taking 1 hour.

In May 2020, in order to attract more foreign visitors, Ibaraki Prefectural Government planned to adopt the English nickname "Tokyo Ibaraki International Airport" for overseas promotion. However, due to the overwhelming opposition, the government ultimately chose the name "Ibaraki International Airport" in June 2020.

== History ==
=== As a military base ===
The airfield was first developed by the Imperial Japanese Navy in 1937, with much of the land claimed from local farmers under the orders of Emperor Hirohito. Unlike many other Japanese military bases, it did not become a US base during the occupation. After the end of World War II, the locals reclaimed the land and resumed farming the land. The base was reopened in 1956 by the Japan Air Self-Defense Force, which took control of the land once again. Many farmers who live around the base have refused to sell their lands to the government to enable expansion of the airfield.

In September 1976 the MiG-25 Foxbat flown by the defecting Soviet pilot Victor Belenko to Hakodate Airport in Hokkaido was moved to Hyakuri by a US Air Force C-5 Galaxy. Despite strong Soviet protests, the Soviet aircraft was extensively examined and disassembled before being returned to the Soviet Union.

In February 1998 Chi Haotian, the-then Chinese defense minister, visited the base among other military sites in Japan.

In 2001 aircraft from Hyakuri were involved in intercepting Tupolev Tu-22M bombers of the Russian Air Force that had entered Japanese airspace.

In 2005 Japan and the US agreed to move some USAF F-15 fighter drills from Kadena Air Base in Okinawa to decrease the burden on that prefecture. Drills were to be moved to five other bases around the country - Chitose in Hokkaido, Hyakuri in Ibaraki Prefecture, Komatsu in Ishikawa Prefecture, Tsuiki in Fukuoka Prefecture and Nyutabaru in Miyazaki Prefecture. In 2005 USAF F-15 aircraft from Kadena Air Base in Okinawa deployed to the base as part of exercise Keen Sword 2005.

In April 2006 the Omitama city assembly unanimously opposed the F-15 training taking place at Hyakuri.

In May 2006 the US and Japan agreed to transfer part of the drills to the bases including Hyakuri with the US deploying to each base two or three times per year from 2007, with Japan footing 75% of the cost. US military personnel sometimes use the base for training or exchange programs. US Navy aircraft sometimes visit the base also, with F/A-18E Super Hornets of VFA-195 based at Naval Air Facility Atsugi in Kanagawa Prefecture deploying there briefly in 2016.

In January 2016 the JASDF used three Kawasaki T-4 trainers from the airport to collect radioactive material after North Korean's fourth nuclear test, which North Korea claimed was a hydrogen bomb test.

In October 2017 an F-4EJ Kai Phantom II of 302nd Tactical Fighter Squadron caught fire on the ground after its landing gear malfunctioned. There were no injuries.

=== Hyakuri Peace Park ===
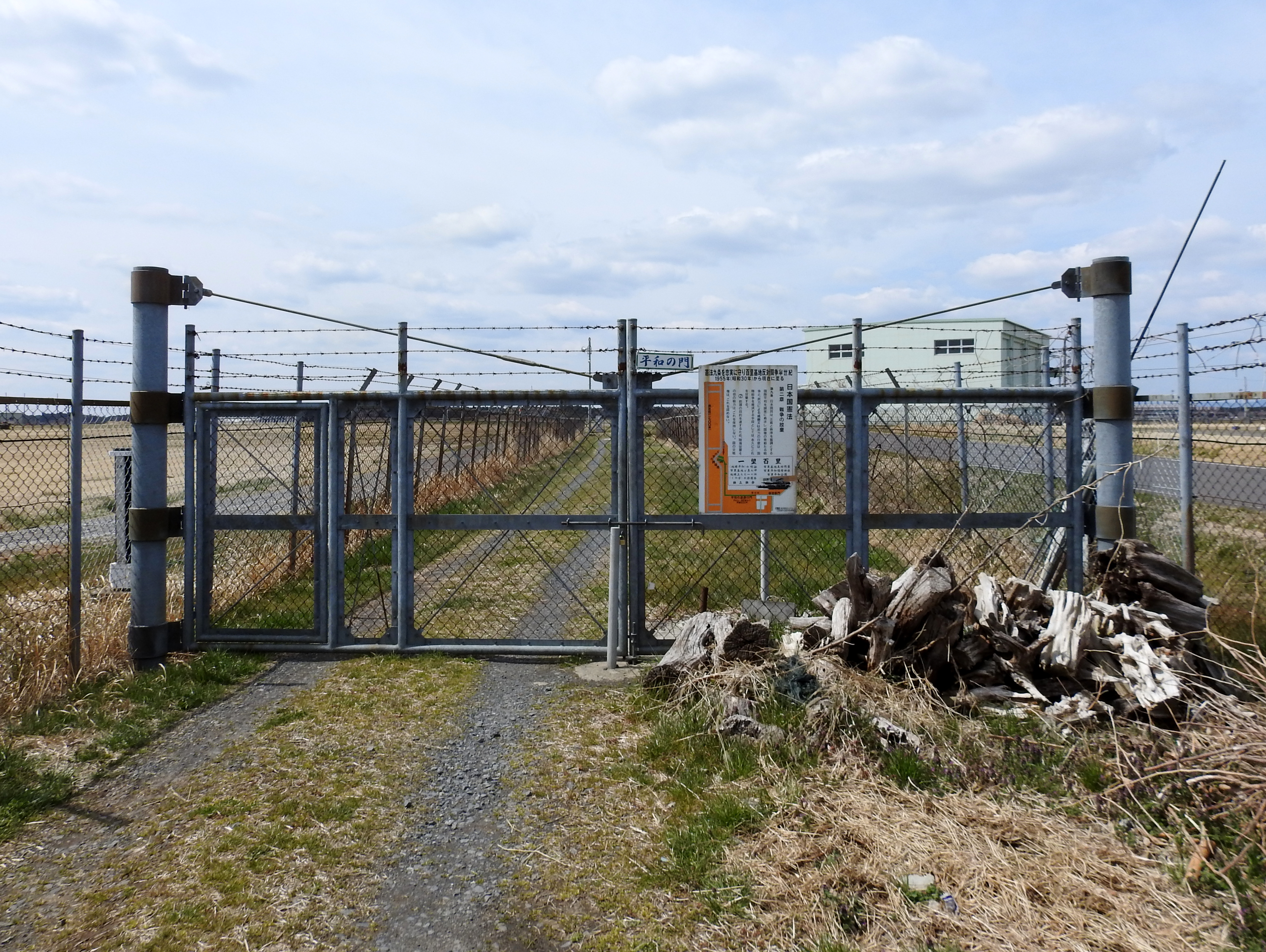
Peace Park entrance (2017)

The Hyakuri Peace Park is located in the air base. The main taxiway used by the air base goes around it.

=== Air Show ===
Hyakuri Air Base holds an annual air show in December featuring displays of military aircraft from the base as well as other equipment. There is a display by Blue Impulse, the JASDF aerobatic team.

=== As a civilian airport ===
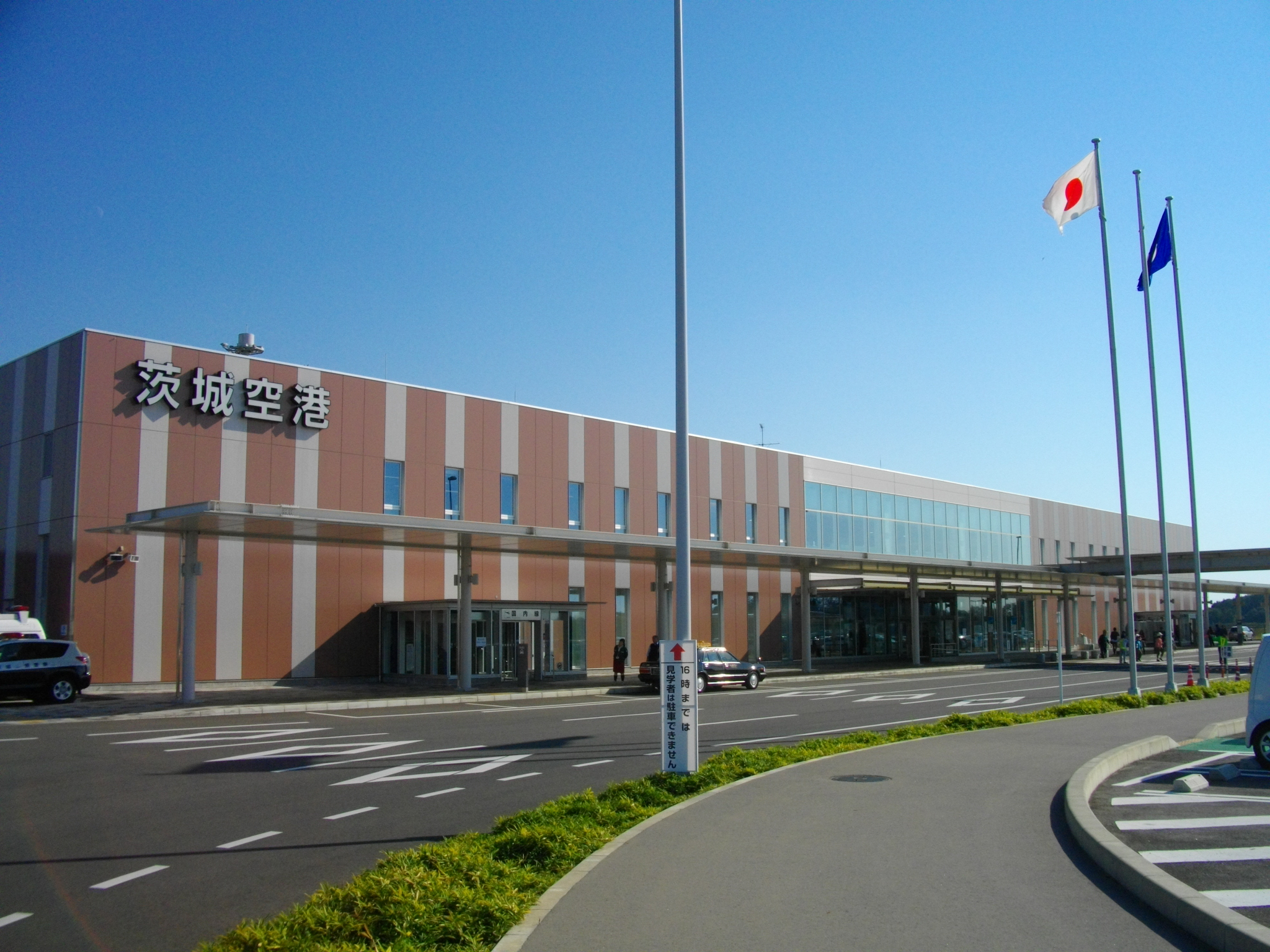
The passenger terminal for Ibaraki Airport.

In March 2010, after a 22 billion yen ($243 million) local and national government investment, the airfield was renamed to Ibaraki Airport, and civil aviation operations began. At the time of opening, Ibaraki offered two flights, an Asiana service to Seoul, South Korea, and to Kobe in western Japan, by Skymark Airlines. The original plans for a three-story terminal with separate arrivals, departures, and sightseeing levels was scrapped by the governor of Ibaraki Prefecture, Masaru Hashimoto, who ordered the building to be reduced to one story in height, to reduce costs. The airport will eschew jetways, with passengers boarding planes from the tarmac. Additional cost-cutting measures, intended to allow the airport to charge lower landing fees than those at Narita and Haneda, include the use of aircraft parking procedures that reduce or eliminate the need for pushback tractors, and the possibility of having the passengers carry their own luggage to the aircraft, a practice used at some regional airports in the United States.

Interest in the airport has been expressed by the Malaysian carrier AirAsia X as well as Korean airline Asiana, but only the latter has committed to flying out of the airport on a fixed basis. TransAsia Airways has committed to flights to and from Taipei's Taoyuan Airport on a semi-regular basis from March to May. During the May holiday, charters to Guam, Cebu, Bali, and Hainan will operate out of the airport. Also, China-based low-cost carrier Spring Airlines has chosen this airport as its Tokyo-area destination with its recent approval for international flying. It planned to run three charter flights a week from Shanghai-Pudong starting from about the end of July 2010 for about two months, switching to scheduled flights at the end of this period (around the end of the World Expo). However, it has started selling seats on the charters in the same manner as a normal flight since September 2010, much like the early Hongqiao-Haneda "scheduled charters" and has operated the flight as a scheduled service starting from 2011. In addition, it has now increased service to five flights a week.

As of March 2011, flights to Shanghai were operating at 80% capacity and the flights to Kobe at 50% capacity. On March 11, 2011, the roof of one of the terminals came down in the 2011 Tōhoku earthquake and tsunami but was quickly repaired.

A total of 860,000 people visited the airport terminal in its first year with 203,070 of those being traveling passengers.

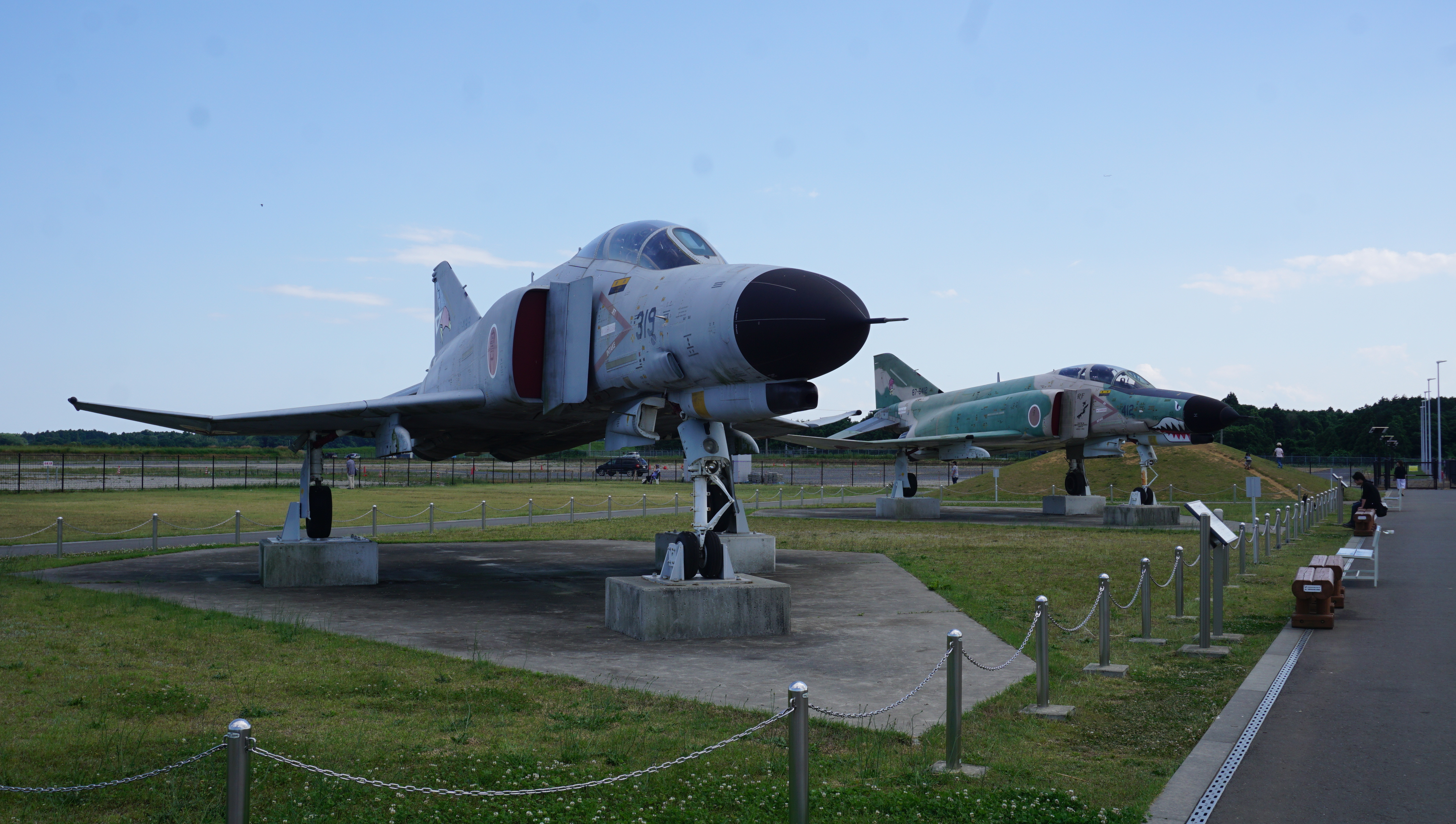
ex-JASDF F-4EJs on display at Ibaraki airport (2017)

Asiana Airlines ceased operations from Incheon International Airport to Ibaraki Airport following the 2011 disaster.

In August 2013, Myanmar Airways International signed a letter of intent to begin thrice-weekly direct "program charter" service between Yangon and Ibaraki by December 2013. MAI stated that they wished to avoid the overcrowding of Narita and Kansai Airport, and that Ibaraki Prefecture waged a year-long lobbying campaign which included visits to the Myanmar ambassador in Tokyo. This flight was to be the second regularly scheduled flight between Japan and Myanmar (the first being All Nippon Airways service between Narita and Yangon). However, as of 2017, the program charter service between Yangon and Ibaraki has not yet started.

== Airlines and destinations ==
Airlines	Destinations
Aero K	Cheongju
Skymark Airlines	Fukuoka, Kobe, Naha, Sapporo–Chitose

== Ground transportation ==
=== Bus service ===
Buses connect Ibaraki Airport with various train stations in Ibaraki prefecture and Tokyo station.

- City buses
  - Passengers who stay at a hotel in Ibaraki are entitled to a free single journey on one of the following buses:

Bus stop	Bus	Via	Destination	Company
No.1	Ibaraki-Kūkō Renraku bus	Tamari Station・Ogawa Station・Tamatsukuri Station	Ishioka Station	Kantetsu-Green bus
No.1	Hokota-Ibaraki Kūkō Line	Hokota Station	Shin-Hokota Station	Kantetsu-Green bus
No.2	Ogawa Station-Ibaraki-Kūkō-Mito Station Line	Kenchō-mae・Mito Station	Yoshizawa-Shako	Kantetsu-Green bus

- Highway buses

bus stop	Name	Via	destination	Company	Note
No.2	Ibaraki-Kūkō↔Mito Station Line	Non stop	Mito Station	Kanto Railway	
No.2	Ibaraki-Kūkō↔Hitachi-ota Highway buses Terminal（Hitachi-Ōta Station）Line	Mito Station・Katsuta Station・Tokai Station	Hitachi-ota Highway buses Terminal (Hitachi-Ōta Station)	Ibaraki Kotsu	
No.3	Ibaraki-Kūkō↔Tokyo Station Line	Non stop	Tokyo Station	Kanto Railway	※
No.4	Ibaraki-Kūkō↔Tsukuba Center Line	Shimo-Hirooka (You are able to transfer onto bus routes bound to Tsuchiura Station or Tokyo Station, Mito Station (Ibaraki))	Tsukuba Center (Tsukuba Station)	Kanto Railway	
No.4	Ibaraki-Kūkō↔Tsukuba Center Line	Shimo-Hirooka (You are able to transfer onto bus routes bound to Tsuchiura Station or Tokyo Station, Mito Station (Ibaraki))	the start of Mount Tsukuba trail (Tsukubasan-Shrine)	Kanto Railway	Runs only when there is a flight<Ibaraki-airportーIncheon International Airport (Eastar Jet)>

== Japan Air Self-Defense Force ==
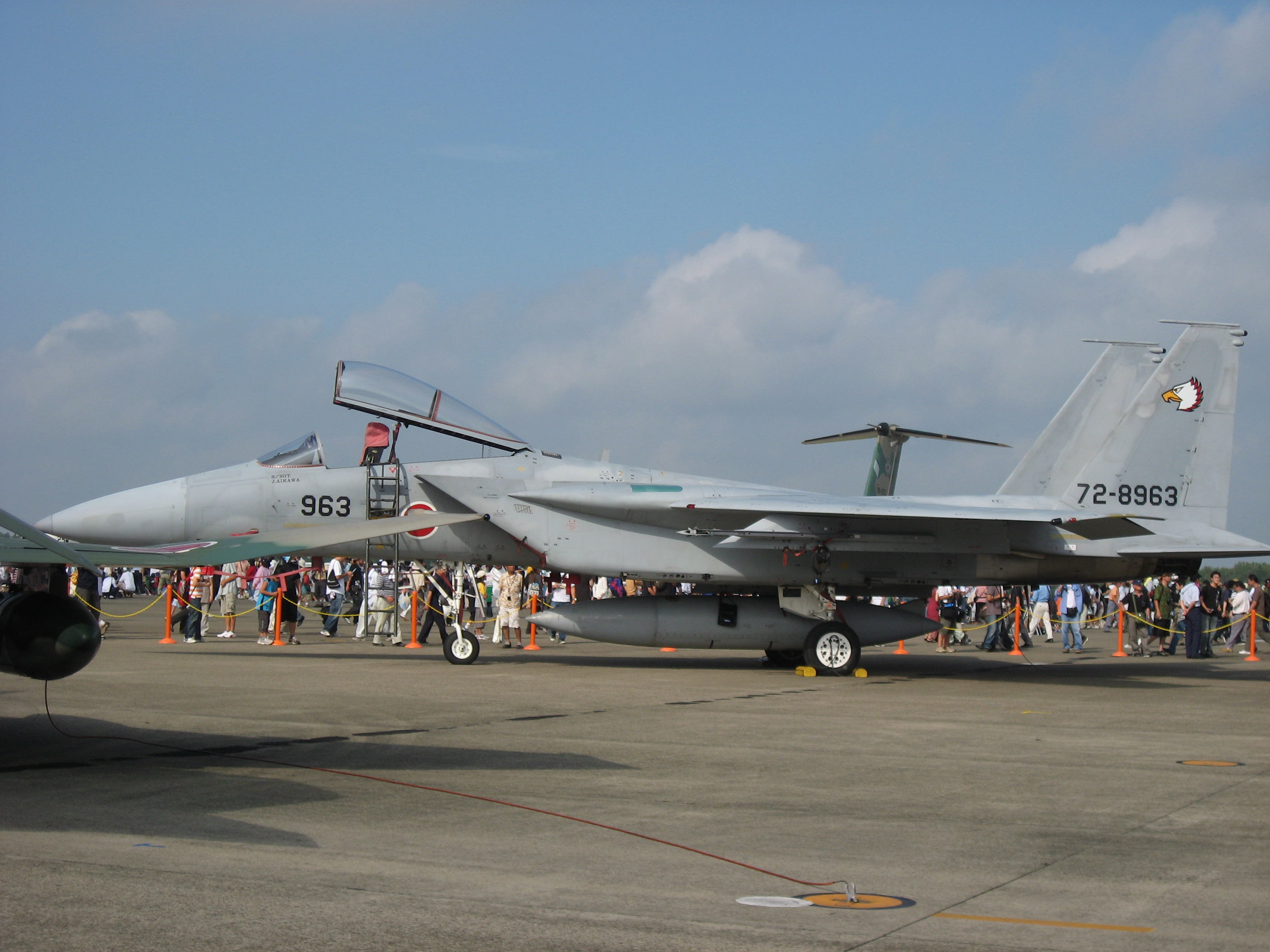
F-15J Eagle of 306 Sqn at Hyakuri Airshow (2007)

As of 2017, all of the remaining F-4 Phantom II aircraft belonging to the JASDF operate from Hyakuri Air Base. As such it has become popular among aviation photographers and enthusiasts.

=== Central Air Defense Force ===
- 7th Air Wing
  - 3rd Tactical Fighter Squadron (Mitsubishi F-2A/B, Kawasaki T-4)

=== Air Rescue Wing ===
- Air Rescue Wing Hyakuri Detachment (UH-60J, U-125A)
