= Ibaraki Prefectural Government Building =

Skyscraper in Mito, Ibaraki Prefecture, Japan

Coordinates: 36°20′30″N 140°26′48″E

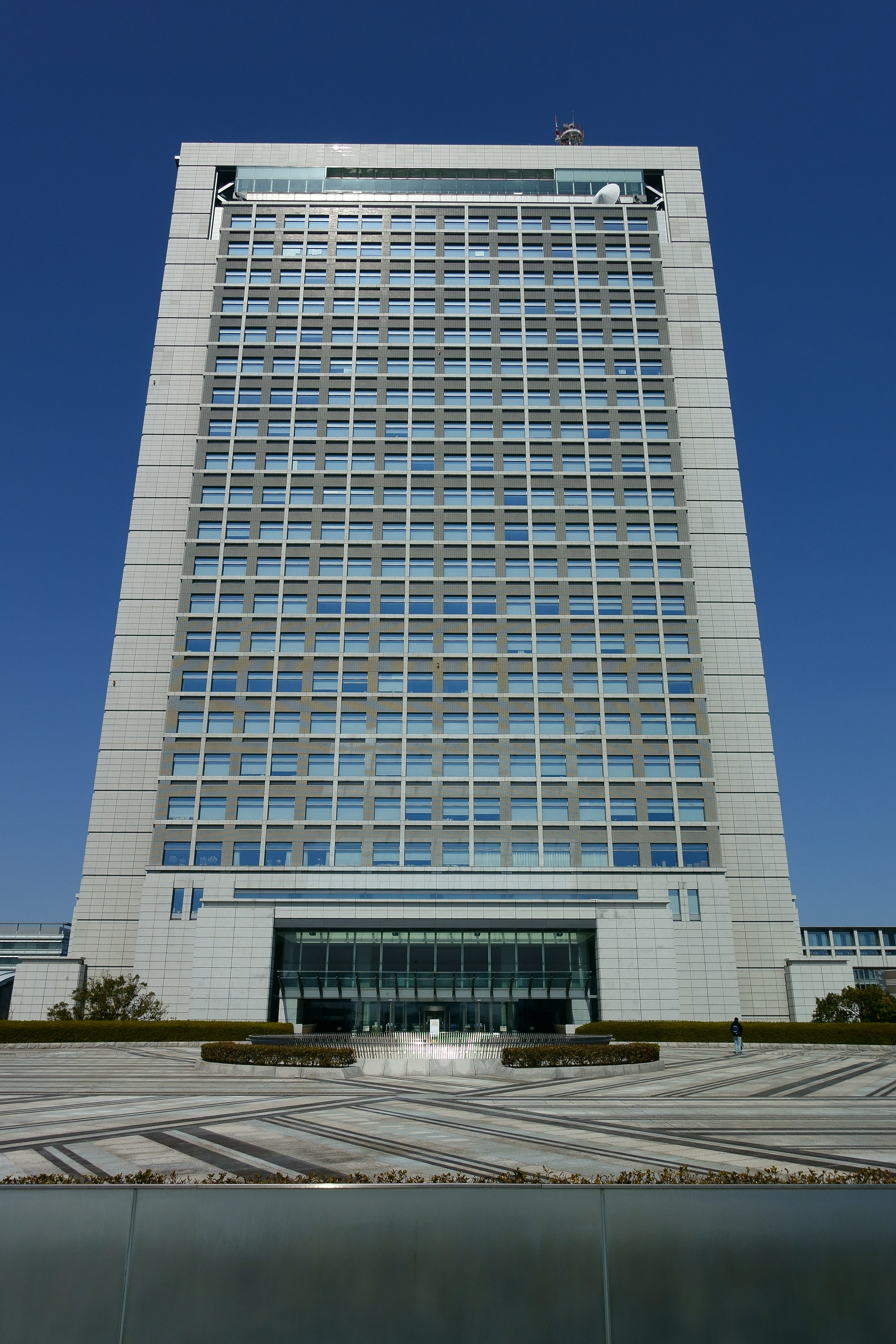
Ibaraki Prefectural Government Building

The Ibaraki Prefectural Government Building (茨城県庁舎, Ibaraki-ken Shōsha) is a skyscraper located in Mito, Ibaraki Prefecture, Japan. Construction of the 120-metre, 25-storey skyscraper was finished in 2004.
