= Takahama Station (Ibaraki) =

Railway station in Ishioka, Ibaraki Prefecture, Japan

Takahama Station 高浜駅
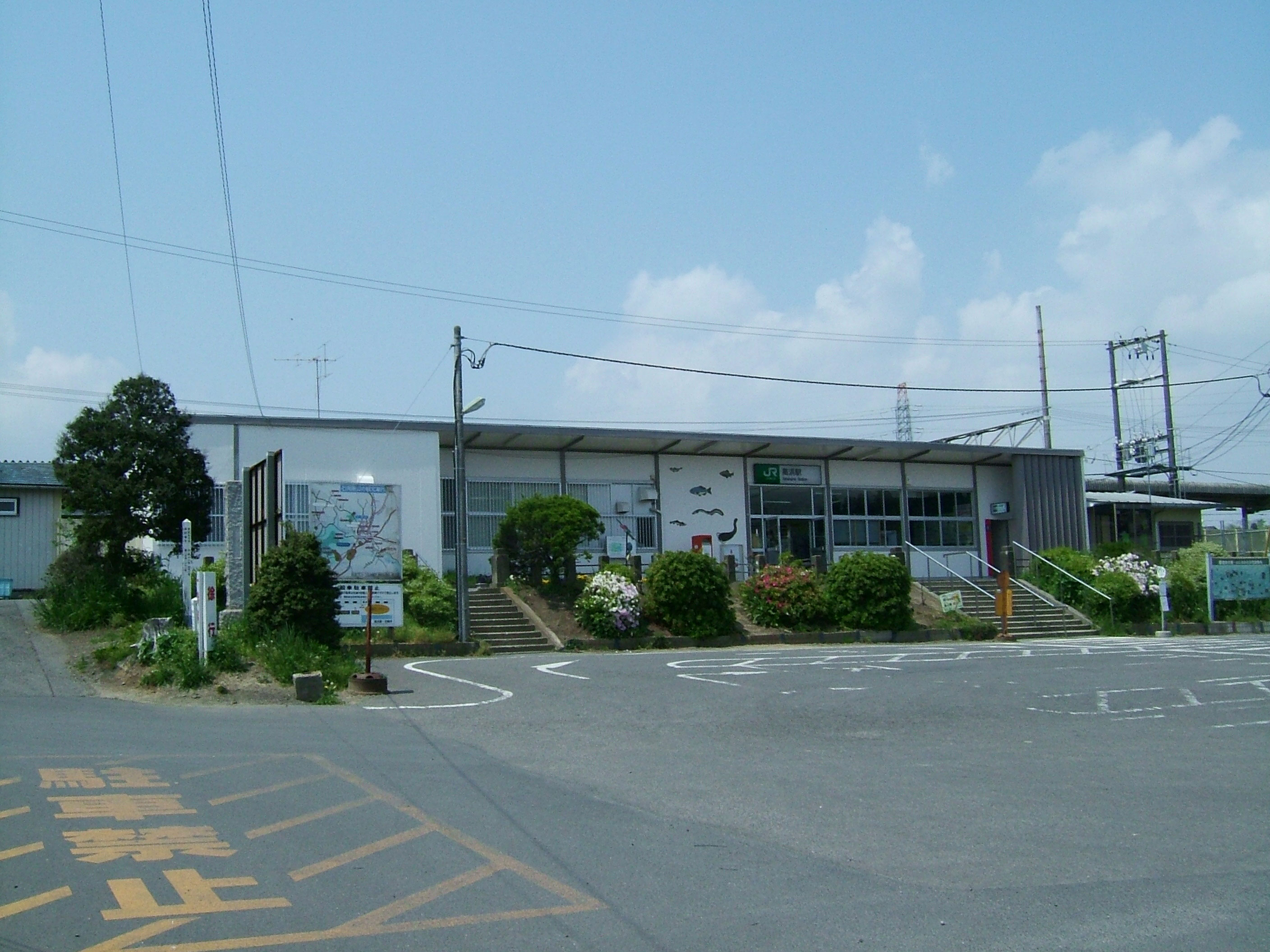
- Takahama Station, April 2008

General information
- Location: Kitanemoto 245, Ishioka-shi, Ibaraki-ken 315-0044; Japan
- Coordinates: 36°09′50″N 140°17′41″E
- Operator: JR East
- Line: ■ Jōban Line
- Distance: 76.4 km from Nippori
- Platforms: 1 side + 1 island platform

Other information
- Status: Staffed
- Website: Official website

History
- Opened: 4 November 1895

Passengers
- FY2019: 1119 daily

Services
Preceding station	JR East	Following station
Kandatsu towards Shinagawa	Jōban Line Local-Futsuu	Ishioka towards Sendai
Location
- Location within Ibaraki Prefecture Location within Japan

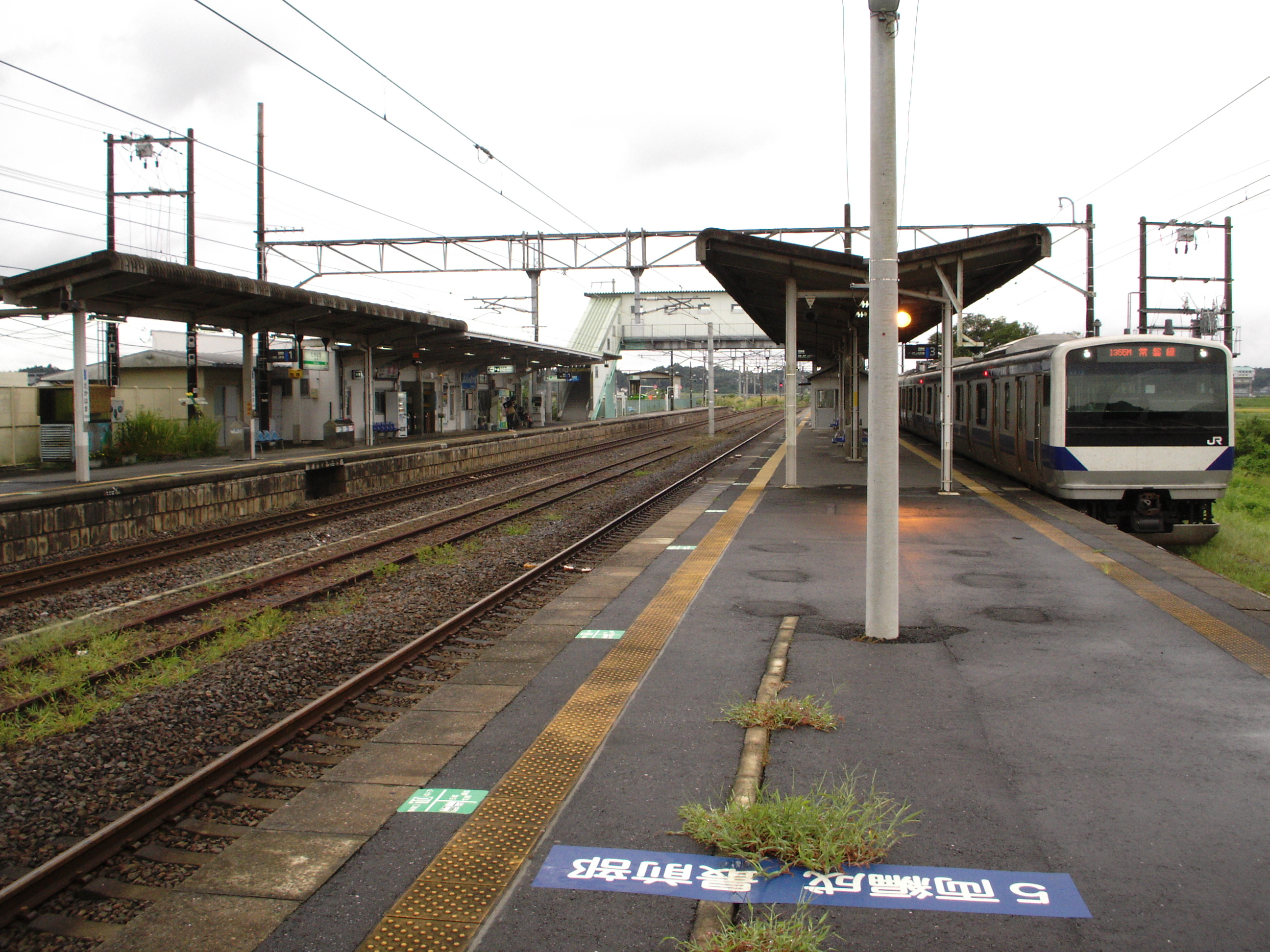
Takahama Station platforms, 2007

Takahama Station (高浜駅, Takahama-eki) is a passenger railway station located in the city of Ishioka, Ibaraki Prefecture, Japan operated by the East Japan Railway Company (JR East).

== Lines ==
Takahama Station is served by the Jōban Line, and is located 76.4 km from the official starting point of the line at Nippori Station.

== Station layout ==
The station consists one side platform and one island platform, connected to the station building by a footbridge. The station is staffed. Two local trains stop approximately every hour during the day.

=== Platforms ===
1	■ Jōban Line ( Ueno-Tokyo Line)	for Tsuchiura, Toride, Ueno, Tokyo and Shinagawa
2, 3	■ Jōban Line	for Ishioka, Tomobe, Mito, Takahagi and Iwaki

== History ==
Takahama Station was opened on 4 November 1895. The station was absorbed into the JR East network upon the privatization of the Japanese National Railways (JNR) on 1 April 1987.

== Passenger statistics ==
In fiscal 2019, the station was used by an average of 1118 passengers daily (boarding passengers only).

== Surrounding area ==
- National Route 355
- Takahama Post Office
- Funazukayama Kofun

== See also ==
- List of railway stations in Japan
