= Japan National Route 355 =

National highway in Japan

National Route 355
- 国道355号
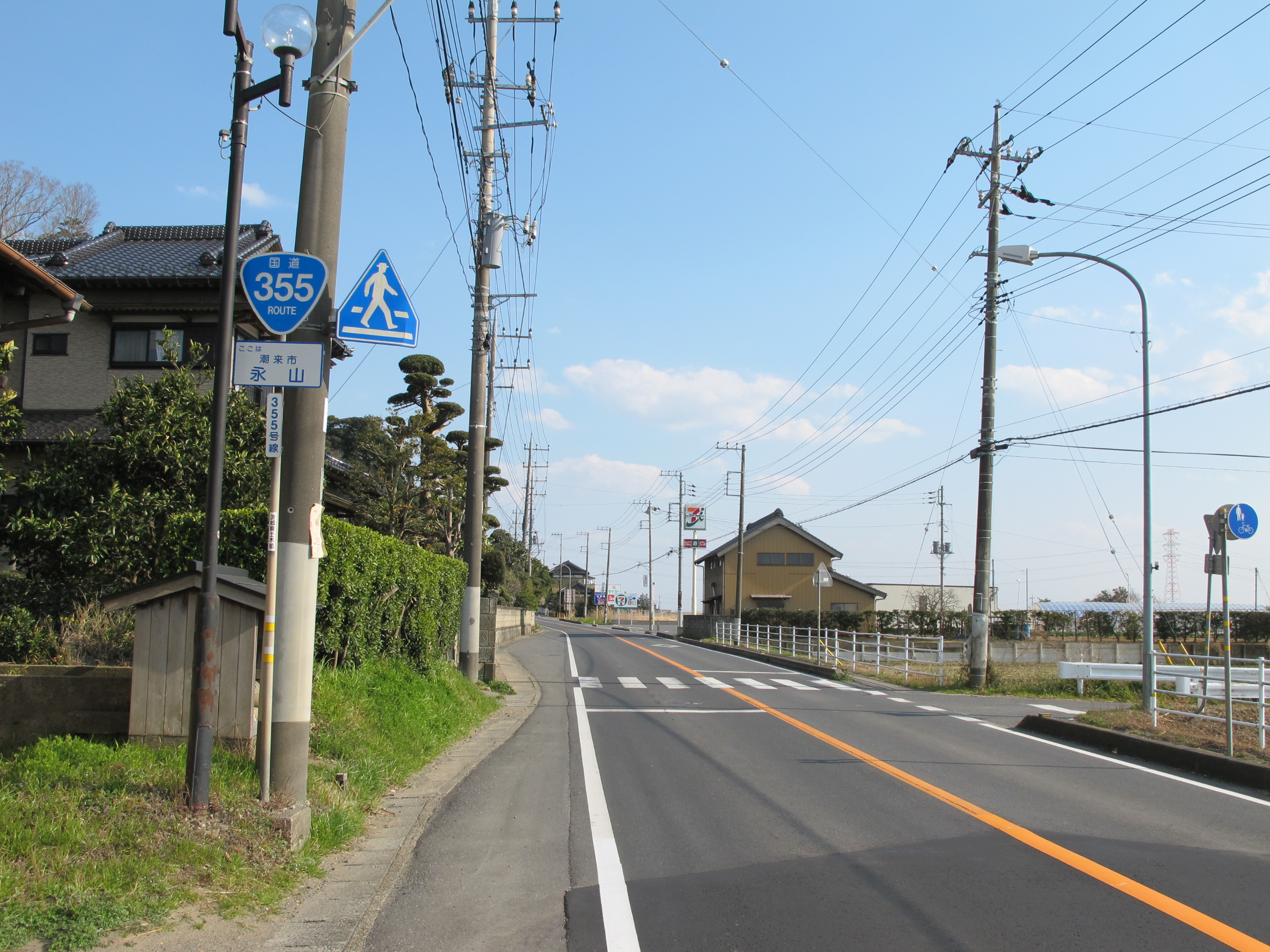

Route information
- Length: 73.8 km (45.9 mi)
- Existed: 1 April 1975–present

Major junctions
- North end: National Route 50 in Kasama, Ibaraki
- South end: National Route 51 in Katori, Chiba

Location
- Country: Japan

Highway system
- National highways of Japan; Expressways of Japan
| ← National Route 354 | → National Route 356 |

National Route 355 is a national highway of Japan connecting Katori, Chiba and Kasama, Ibaraki in Japan, with a total length of 73.8 km (45.86 mi).
