= Ishioka Station =

Railway station in Ishioka, Ibaraki Prefecture, Japan

Ishioka Station 石岡駅
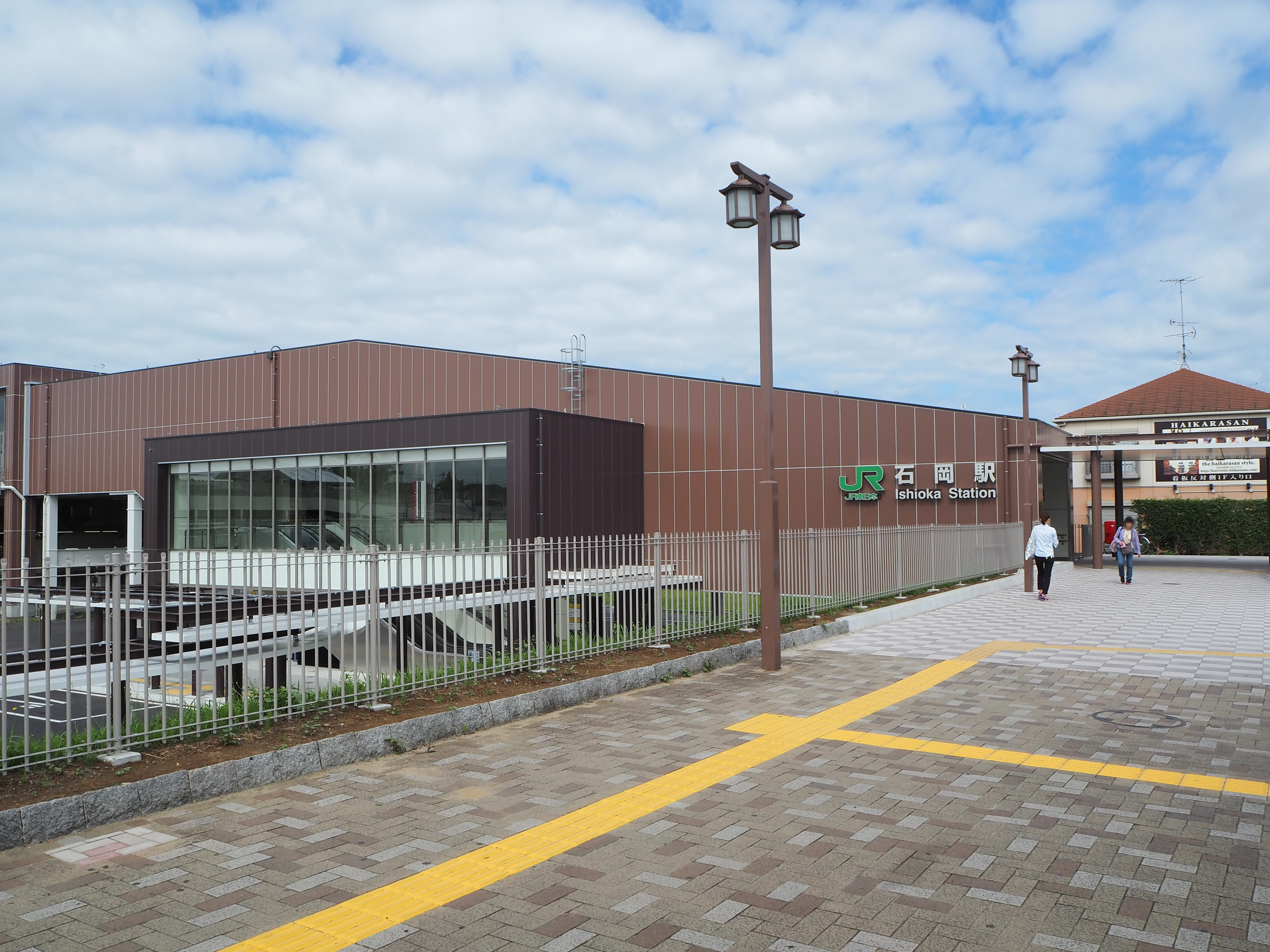
- The east entrance of Ishioka Station in September 2016

General information
- Location: 1-1-17 Kokufu, Ishioka-shi, Ibaraki-ken 315-0014; Japan
- Coordinates: 36°11′29″N 140°16′47″E
- Operator: JR East
- Line: ■ Joban Line
- Distance: 80.0 km from Nippori
- Platforms: 1 side platform + 1 island platform
- Tracks: 3

Other information
- Status: Staffed ("Midori no Madoguchi" )
- Website: www.jreast.co.jp/estation/station/info.aspx?StationCd=112

History
- Opened: 4 November 1895

Passengers
- FY2019: 5591 daily

Services
Preceding station	JR East	Following station
Tsuchiura towards Shinagawa	Tokiwa	Tomobe towards Takahagi
Takahama towards Shinagawa	Jōban Line Local-Futsuu	Hatori towards Sendai
Location
- Location within Ibaraki Prefecture Location within Japan

Ishioka Station (石岡駅, Ishioka-eki) is a passenger railway station located in the city of Ishioka, Ibaraki Prefecture, Japan operated by the East Japan Railway Company (JR East).

== Lines ==
Ishioka Station is served by the Joban Line, and is located 80.0 km from the official starting point of the line at Nippori Station. It also used to be the terminal for the Kashima Railway Line until the line closed on 31 March 2007.

== Station layout ==
The station consists of one side platform and one island platform, connected to the station building by a footbridge. The station has a "Midori no Madoguchi" staffed ticket office.

=== Platforms ===
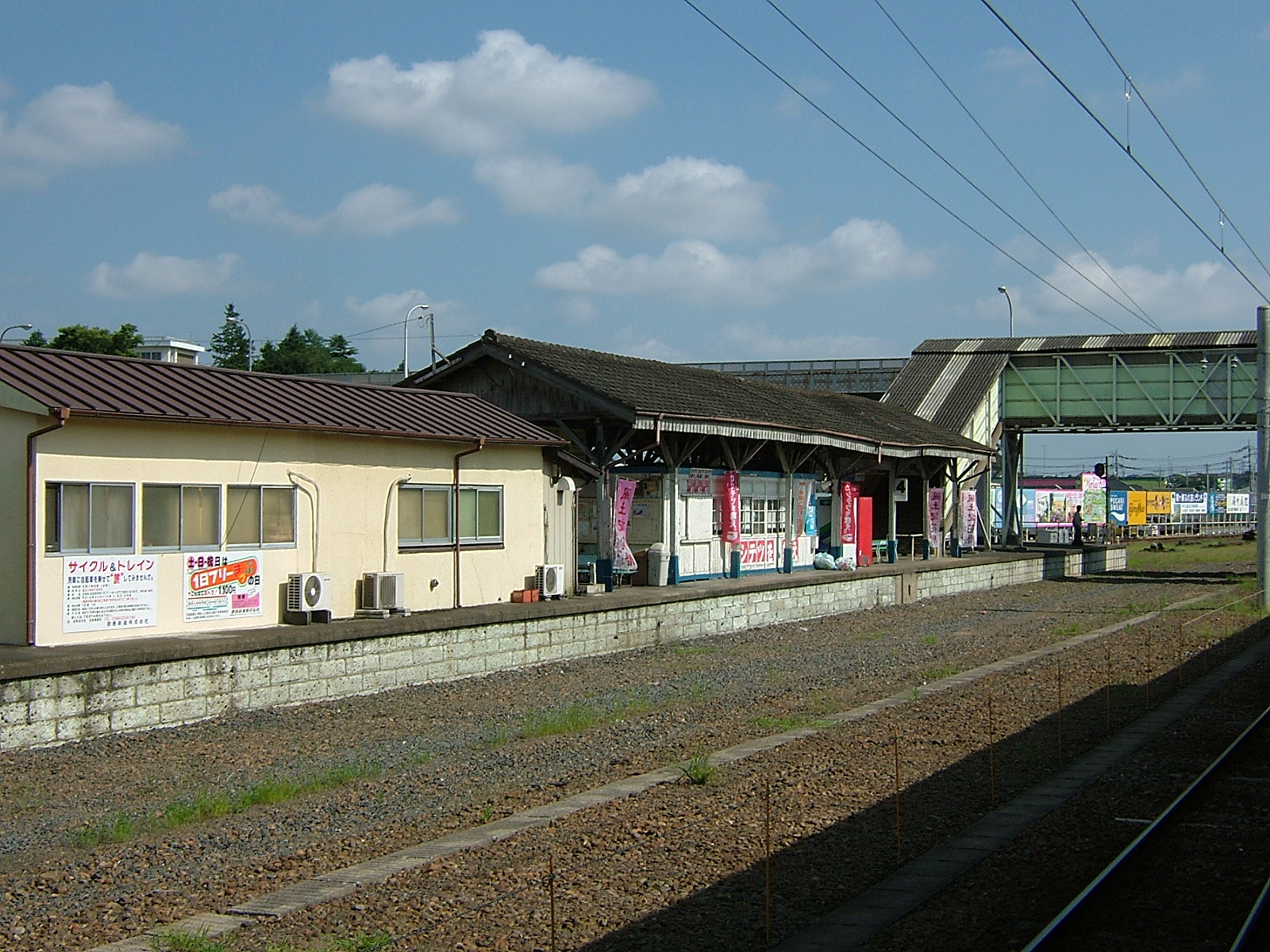
The former Kashima Railway platform in September 2006

1	■ Jōban Line	for Tomobe, Mito, Katsuta, Hitachi, Takahagi and Iwaki
2, 3	■ Jōban Line ( Ueno-Tokyo Line)	for Tsuchiura, Toride, Kashiwa, Ueno, Tokyo and Shinagawa

There was also a platform and depot for the Kashima Railway Line, from 1922 until it closed on 31 March 2007.

== History ==
The station opened on 4 November 1895. The station was absorbed into the JR East network upon the privatization of the Japanese National Railways (JNR) on 1 April 1987.

== Passenger statistics ==
In fiscal 2019, the station was used by an average of 5591 passengers daily (boarding passengers only).

== Surrounding area ==
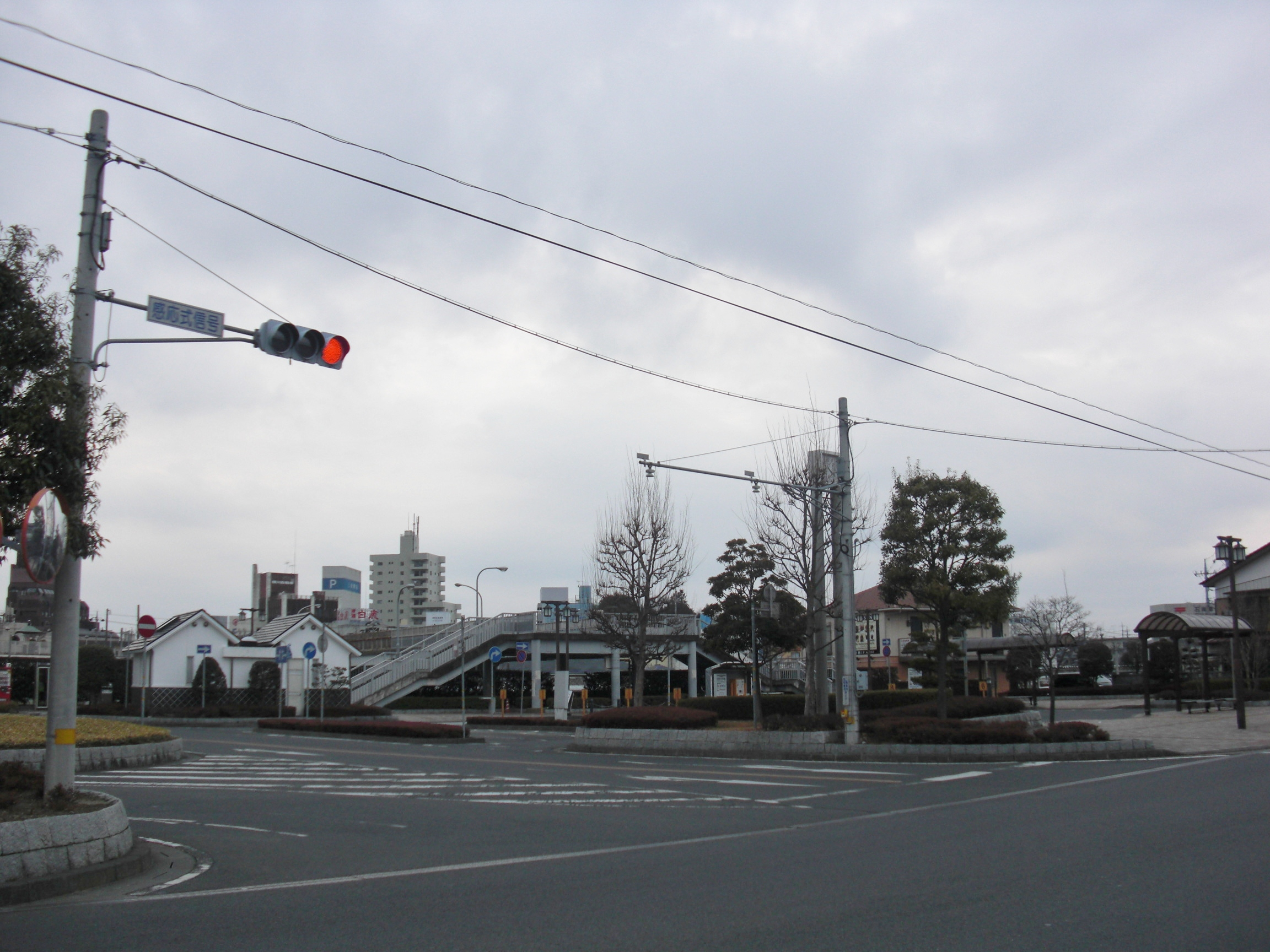
East side of the station, February 2012

- Ishioka City Hall
- Ishioka No1. High School

There is a bus service from here to Ibaraki Airport, Hokota Station and Shin-Hokota Station.

== See also ==
- List of railway stations in Japan
