= List of places of scenic beauty of Japan (Ibaraki) =

This list is of the places of scenic beauty of Japan located within the Prefecture of Ibaraki.

== National Places of Scenic Beauty ==
As of 1 June 2022, five Places have been designated at a national level.

Site	Municipality	Comments	Image	Coordinates	Type	Ref.
Fukuroda Falls 袋田の滝及び生瀬滝; Fukuroda-no-taki oyobi nama-sedaki	Daigo			36°45′52″N 140°24′28″E	6	
Sakuragawa 桜川（サクラ） Sakuragawa (sakura)	Sakuragawa			36°21′57″N 140°08′14″E	3	
Tokiwa Park 常磐公園; Tokiwa kōen	Mito	also an Historic Site; see also Kairaku-en and Tokiwa Jinja		36°22′28″N 140°27′09″E	1	
Nishiyama Goten Site (Seizansō) 西山御殿跡（西山荘） Nishiyama goten ato (Seizansō)	Hitachiōta	also an Historic Site		36°32′31″N 140°30′24″E	8	
Okayama Family Gardens (Yōkō-en) 岡山氏庭園(養浩園); Okayama-shi teien (Yōkō-en)	Hitachiōmiya					

== Prefectural Places of Scenic Beauty ==
As of 1 January 2022, five Places have been designated at a prefectural level.

Site	Municipality	Comments	Image	Coordinates	Type	Ref.
Cape Ayu 歩崎; Ayu-mizaki	Kasumigaura	in Suigō-Tsukuba Quasi-National Park		36°04′27″N 140°22′30″E		
Hiro Bay 広浦; Hiro-ura	Ibaraki			36°17′11″N 140°31′17″E		
Oyazawa 親沢; Oyazawa	Ibaraki			36°16′40″N 140°28′45″E		
Fukuroda Falls 袋田瀧; Fukuroda-no-taki	Daigo			36°45′52″N 140°24′28″E		
Hanazono Valley 花園渓谷「七ツ滝」 Hanazono keikoku (Nanatsu-taki)	Kitaibaraki			36°53′15″N 140°37′33″E		

== Municipal Places of Scenic Beauty ==
As of 1 May 2021, twelve Places have been designated at a municipal level.

== Registered Places of Scenic Beauty ==
As of 1 June 2022, one Monument has been registered (as opposed to designated) as a Place of Scenic Beauty at a national level.

Place	Municipality	Comments	Image	Coordinates	Type	Ref.
Former Okakura Tenshin Residence and Gardens - Dai-Izura, Shō-Izura 岡倉天心旧宅・庭園及び大五浦・小五浦; Okakura Tenshin kyū-taku・teien oyobi Dai-Izura・Shō-Izura	Kitaibaraki	also a registered Historic Site		36°50′00″N 140°48′12″E		

== See also ==
- Cultural Properties of Japan
- List of parks and gardens of Ibaraki Prefecture
- List of Historic Sites of Japan (Ibaraki)
- List of Cultural Properties of Japan – paintings (Ibaraki)
