= The Museum of Modern Art, Ibaraki =

- 茨城県近代美術館
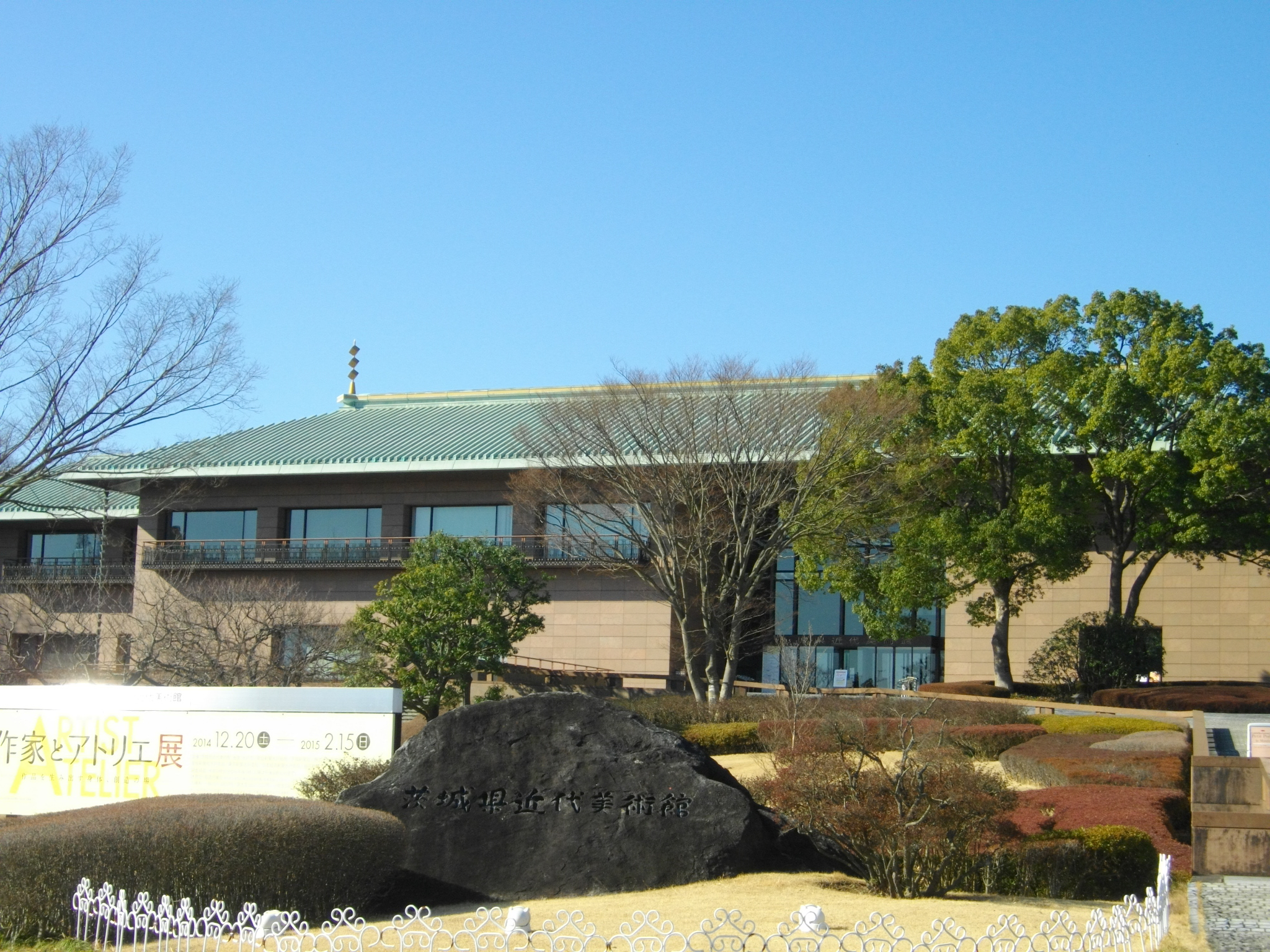
- Established: October 1988
- Location: 666-1 Higashikubo, Senba-chō, Mito, Ibaraki Prefecture 310-0851, Japan
- Coordinates: 36°22′04″N 140°27′55″E
- Type: modern art
- Accreditation: Ibaraki Prefectural Board of Education
- Collection size: 3,700
- Owner: Ibaraki Prefecture
- Website: www.modernart.museum.ibk.ed.jp
- Building details

Technical details
- Floor area: 10,502 m^{2}

Design and construction
- Architect: Junzō Yoshimura

The Museum of Modern Art, Ibaraki (茨城県近代美術館, Ibaraki-ken kindai bijutsukan) opened on the shore of Lake Senba (千波湖) in Mito, Ibaraki Prefecture, Japan, in October 1988. The collection, numbering some 3,700 pieces as of October 2015, includes works by Manet, Monet, and Renoir, Gustave Courbet, Eugène Carrière, Camille Pissarro und Alfred Sisley as well as Yōga and Nihonga by artists including Tsuguharu Foujita, Heihachirō Fukuda, Taikan Yokoyama, Yukihiko Yasuda, Tetsugoro Yorozu, Kanzan Shimomura, Kenzo Okada, Yasuo Kuniyoshi, Kiyokata Kaburagi, Kokei Kobayashi, Gyoshū Hayami, Hishida Shunsō, and Shikō Imamura.

Noteworthy works in the collection include Chrysanthèmes by Édouard Manet, Grotte de Port-Domois by Claude Monet and Portrait de Mademoiselle Francois by Pierre-Auguste Renoir.

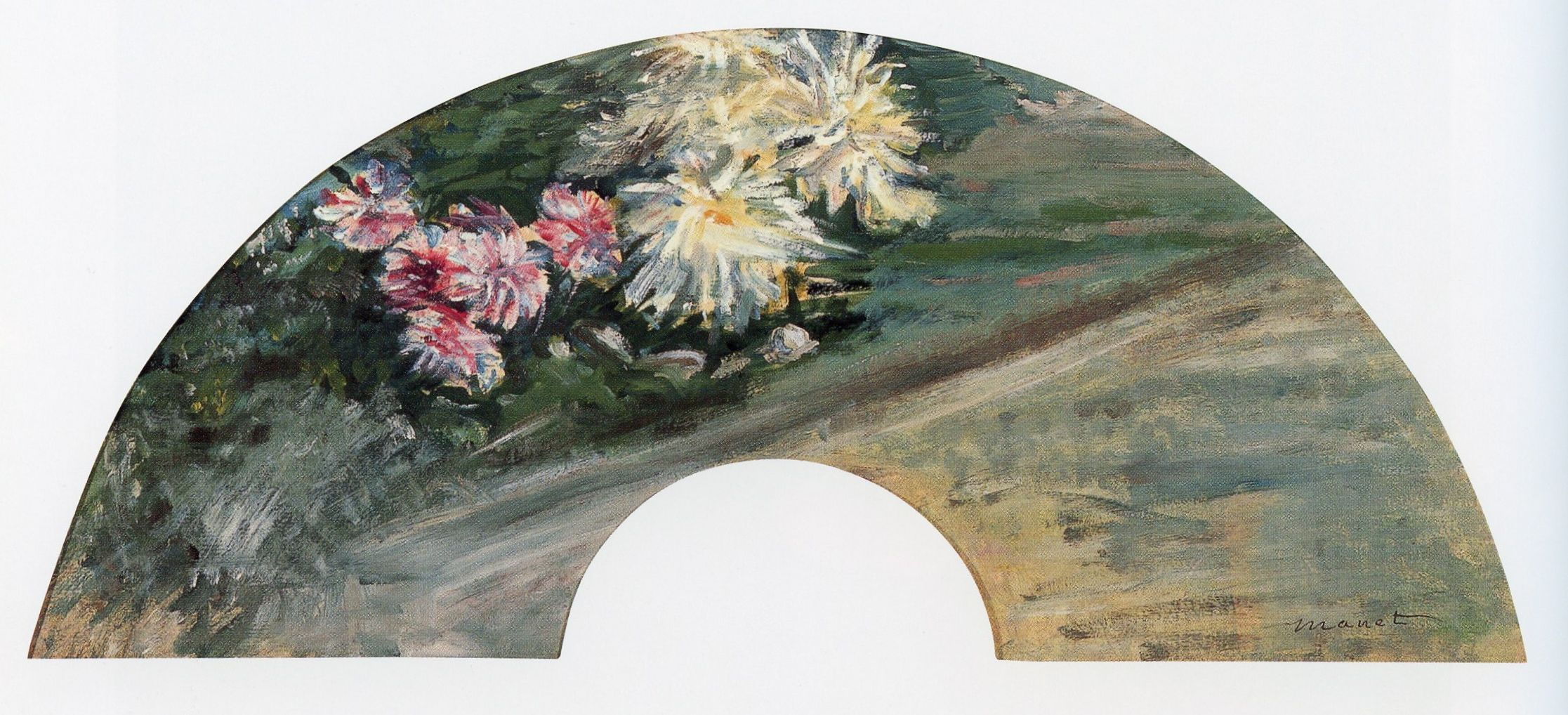
Édouard Manet:
Chrysanthèmes

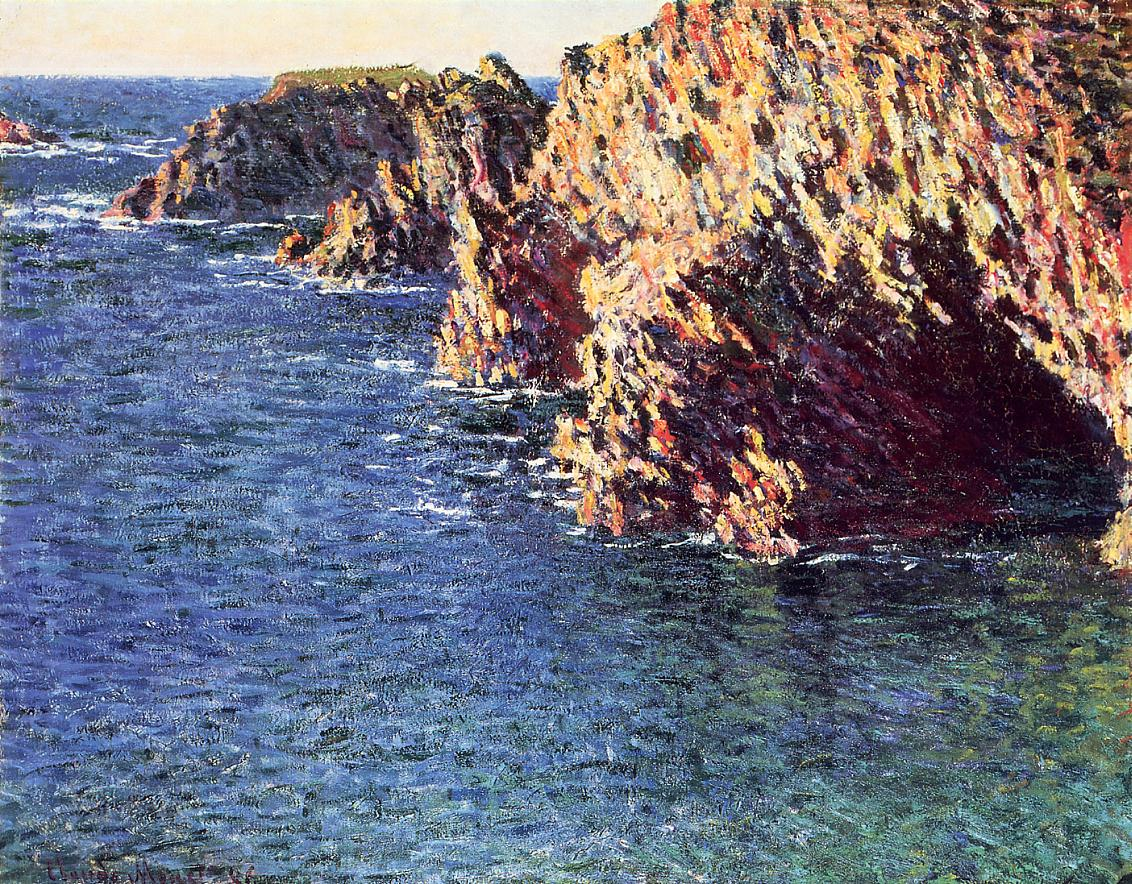
Claude Monet:
Grotte de Port-Domois

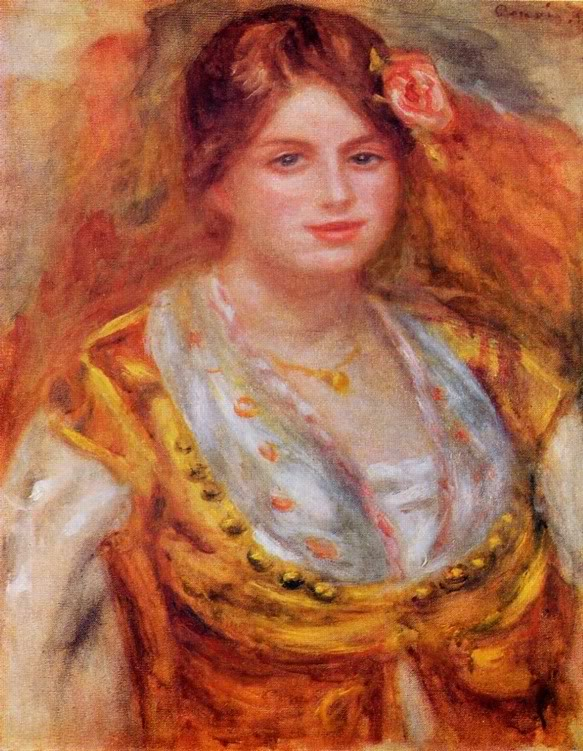
Pierre-Auguste Renoir:
Portrait de Mademoiselle Francois

== See also ==
- Ibaraki Prefectural Museum of History
- List of Cultural Properties of Japan - paintings (Ibaraki)
