= List of cultural properties of Japan – paintings (Ibaraki) =

This list is of the cultural properties of Japan designated in the category of paintings (絵画, kaiga) for the Prefecture of Ibaraki.

== National Cultural Properties ==
As of 1 June 2020, seven Important Cultural Properties have been designated, being of national significance.

| Property | Date | Municipality | Ownership | Comments | Image | Dimensions | Coordinates | Ref. |
|---|---|---|---|---|---|---|---|---|
| Kōhō Oshō, colour on silk Fukuan Oshō, colour on silk 絹本著色高峰和尚像 絹本著色復庵和尚像〈自賛／〉 kenpon chakushoku Kōhō Oshō zō kenpon chakushoku Fukuan Oshō zō (ji-san) | 1290 | Tsuchiura | Hōun-ji (法雲寺) (kept at Tsuchiura City Museum (土浦市立博物館)) | Yuan dynasty; designation includes a portrait of Chūhō Oshō (中峰和尚) | | | 36°05′07″N 140°11′50″E | |
| Sixteen Arhats, colour on silk 絹本著色十六羅漢像 kenpon chakushoku jūroku rakan zō | Kamakura period | Ryūgasaki | Kinryū-ji (金龍寺) | sixteen scrolls | | | 35°56′18″N 140°08′33″E | |
| Hōnen Shōnin, colour on silk 絹本著色法然上人像 kenpon chakushoku Hōnen Shōnin zō | Kamakura period | Naka | Jōfuku-ji (常福寺) | | | | 36°30′11″N 140°27′08″E | |
| Biography of Shūi Kotoku, colour on paper 紙本著色拾遺古徳伝 shihon chakushoku Shūi Kotoku den | 1323 | Naka | Jōfuku-ji (常福寺) | nine scrolls | | 41.5 centimetres (16.3 in) by 1,521 centimetres (49 ft 11 in) to 2,573 centimetres (84 ft 5 in) | 36°30′11″N 140°27′08″E | |
| Biography of Shūi Kotoku, colour on paper (fragment) 紙本著色拾遺古徳伝〈（残闕）／〉 shihon chakushoku Shūi Kotoku den (zanketsu) | Kamakura period | Hokota | Muryōju-ji (無量寿寺) | one scroll | | 40.3 centimetres (15.9 in) by 1,979.8 centimetres (64 ft 11.4 in) | 36°10′39″N 140°28′00″E | |
| Illustrated Biography of Shōtoku Taishi, colour on paper 紙本著色聖徳太子絵伝 shihon chakushoku Shōtoku Taishi e-den | 1321 | Mito | Jingū-ji (上宮寺) (kept at Ibaraki Prefectural Museum of History) | one scroll | | 37.8 centimetres (14.9 in) by 739.4 centimetres (24 ft 3.1 in) | 36°22′45″N 140°27′00″E | |
| Illustrated Biography of Shōtoku Taishi, colour on silk 絹本著色聖徳太子絵伝 kenpon chakushoku Shōtoku Taishi e-den | early Muromachi period | Bandō | Myōan-ji (妙安寺) | one scroll | | 139.4 centimetres (54.9 in) by 81.8 centimetres (32.2 in) | 36°04′26″N 139°51′10″E | |

== Prefectural Cultural Properties ==
As of 1 April 2020, eight-two properties have been designated at a prefectural level.

| Property | Date | Municipality | Ownership | Comments | Image | Dimensions | Coordinates | Ref. |
|---|---|---|---|---|---|---|---|---|
| Wife of Yūki Masatomo, colour on paper 紙本著色結城政朝夫人肖像画 shihon chakushoku Yūki Masatomo fujin shōzōga | Momoyama period | Yūki | Kōkenji (孝顕寺) | | | 54.9 centimetres (21.6 in) by 40.0 centimetres (15.7 in) | 36°18′11″N 139°52′18″E | |
| Doi Toshikatsu, colour on silk 絹本著色土井利勝肖像画 kenpon chakushoku Doi Toshikatsu shōzōga | Edo period | Koga | Shōjō-ji (正定寺) | | | 80 centimetres (31 in) by 37 centimetres (15 in) | 36°11′47″N 139°42′00″E | |
| Oda Masaharu, colour on paper 紙本著色小田政治肖像画 shihon chakushoku Oda Masaharu shōzōga | end of Muromachi period | Tsuchiura | Hōun-ji (法雲寺) | | | | 36°07′45″N 140°08′45″E | |
| Oda Ujiharu, colour on paper 紙本著色小田氏治肖像 shihon chakushoku Oda Ujiharu shōzō | end of Muromachi period | Tsuchiura | Hōun-ji (法雲寺) | | | | 36°07′45″N 140°08′45″E | |
| Makabe Dōmu, colour on paper 紙本著色伝真壁道無像 shihon chakushoku den-Makabe Dōmu zō | C16 | Sakuragawa | Sakuragawa Folklore and History Museum (桜川市歴史民俗資料館) | | | | 36°16′39″N 140°06′03″E | |
| Floating Lanterns, colour on silk, by Yokoyama Taikan 絹本著色「流燈」横山大観筆 kenpon chakushoku ryūtō Yokoyama Taikan hitsu | 1909 | Mito | The Museum of Modern Art, Ibaraki | | | | 36°22′04″N 140°27′55″E | |
| Still Life with Calpis Wrapping Paper, oil on canvas, by Nakamura Tsune カルピスの包み紙のある静物 中村彝筆 油絵麻布 1923年 1面; Karupisu no tsutsumigami no aru seibutsu Nakamura Tsune hitsu abura-e asanuno | 1923 | Mito | The Museum of Modern Art, Ibaraki | | | | 36°22′04″N 140°27′55″E | |
| Fire Destroying the Epang Palace, colour on silk, by Kimura Buzan 絹本彩色 阿房劫火 木村武山筆 kenpon saishoku Abōgō-ka Kimura Buzan hitsu | 1897 | Mito | The Museum of Modern Art, Ibaraki | | | 131 centimetres (52 in) by 230.8 centimetres (90.9 in) | 36°22′04″N 140°27′55″E | |

== See also ==
- Cultural Properties of Japan
- List of National Treasures of Japan (paintings)
- Japanese painting
- List of Historic Sites of Japan (Ibaraki)
- Rokkakudō (Kitaibaraki)
