= Tokiwa Park =

Park in Ube, Japan

- 常盤公園
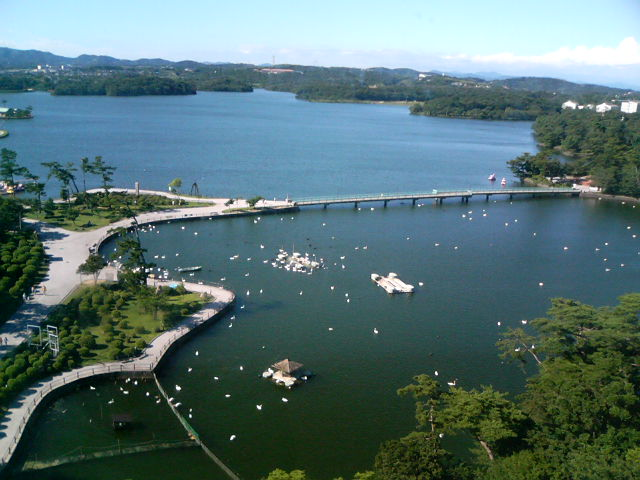
- Interactive map of Tokiwa Park
- Coordinates: 33.948°N 131.283°E
- Created: 1925
- Website: www.tokiwapark.jp

Tokiwa Park (常盤公園, Tokiwa Kōen) is a park located in Ube City in Yamaguchi Prefecture, Japan.

There are great white pelicans living in an enclosure at the park. "Katta-kun", a pelican named because his parents came from Kolkata in India, was born there in 1985 and became a mascot for the park after visiting schools nearby by himself. An anime film titled Katta-kun Monogatari was made about him in 1995. Katta-kun died in 2008.

Australian black swans that had originally been donated by Ube's sister city of Newcastle in Australia lived in the lake until 2011. In either 1978 or 1983 some of these were donated to Mito in Ibaraki Prefecture where some continue to reside in Lake Senba.

There was an outbreak of H1N5 avian influenza there in February 2011, leading to a cull of local birds. All mute swans and black swans at the lake were killed, along with some ducks. The great white pelicans at the park were not culled.

A pair of mute swans was introduced to the park in May 2017, and started breeding the same year.
