= Ōarai Station =

Railway station in Ōarai, Ibaraki Prefecture, Japan

Ōarai Station 大洗駅
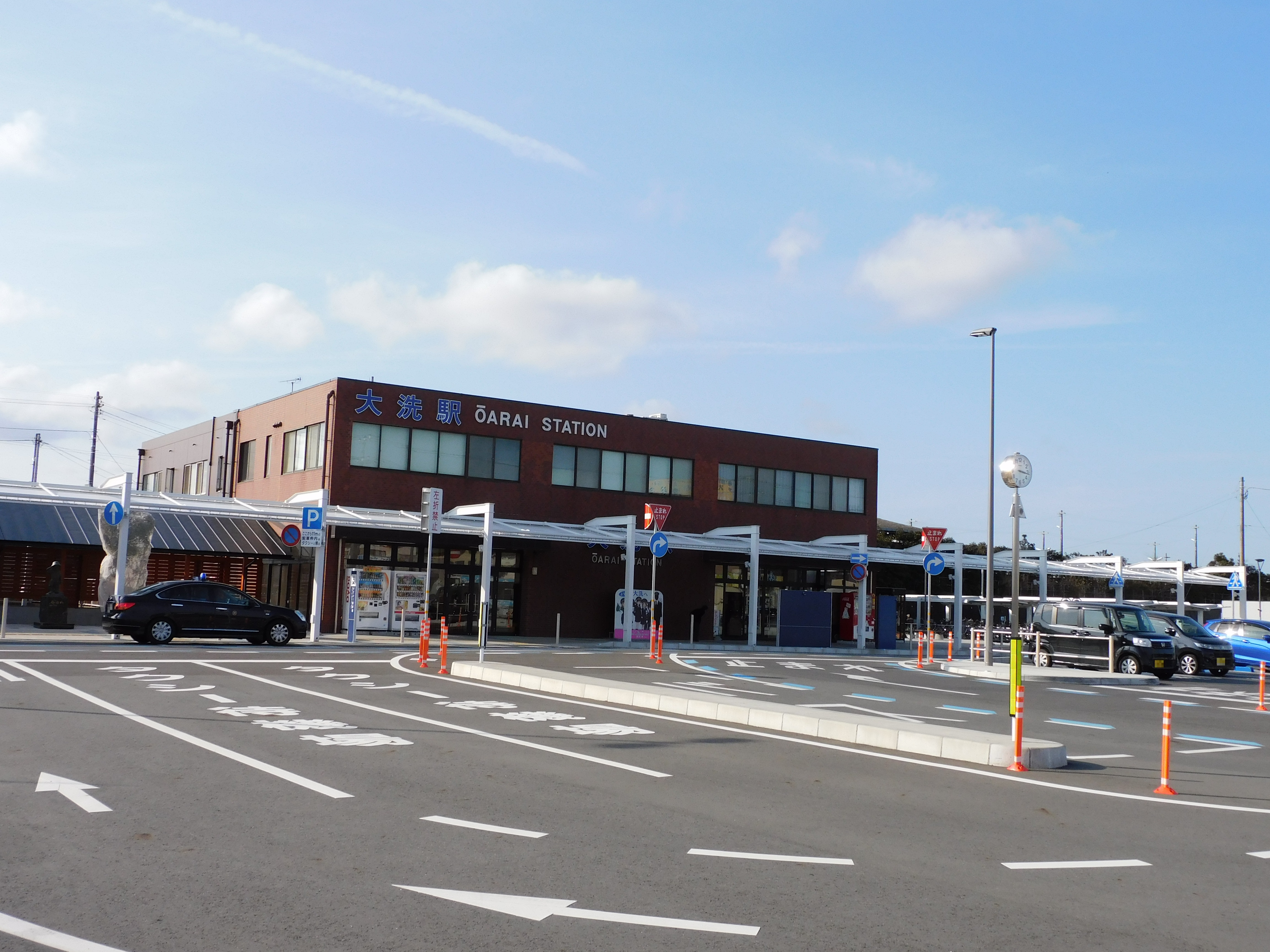
- View of the station entrance in March 2021

General information
- Location: Sakiuramichi 301, Ōarai-machi, Higashiibaraki-gun, Ibaraki-ken 311-1307; Japan
- Coordinates: 36.3152°N 140.5629°E
- Operator: Kashima Rinkai Tetsudo
- Line: ■ Ōarai-Kashima Line
- Distance: 11.6 km from Mito Station
- Platforms: 3 (1 island platform, 1 side platform)
- Connections: Bus terminal

Construction
- Structure type: Elevated

Other information
- Status: Staffed
- Website: Official website

History
- Opened: 14 March 1985

Passengers
- FY2015: 2166 daily

Services
Preceding station	Kashima Rinkai Railway	Following station
Tsunezumi towards Mito	Ōarai Kashima Line	Hinuma towards Kashimajingū
Location
- Location within Ibaraki Prefecture Location within Japan

Ōarai Station (大洗駅, Ōarai-eki) is a passenger railway station in the town of Ōarai, Ibaraki Prefecture, Japan operated by the third sector Kashima Rinkai Railway.

== Lines ==
Ōarai Station is served by the Kashima Rinkai Railway Ōarai Kashima Line from Mito to Kashima Soccer Stadium. Located between Tsunezumi and Hinuma Stations, it is 11.6 km from the line's terminus at Mito.

== Station layout ==
The station consists of one side platform and one island platform, serving a total of three tracks. The station is staffed.

=== Platforms ===
1	■ Ōarai Kashima Line	for Kashimajingū
2, 3	■ Ōarai Kashima Line	for Shin-Hokota and Mito

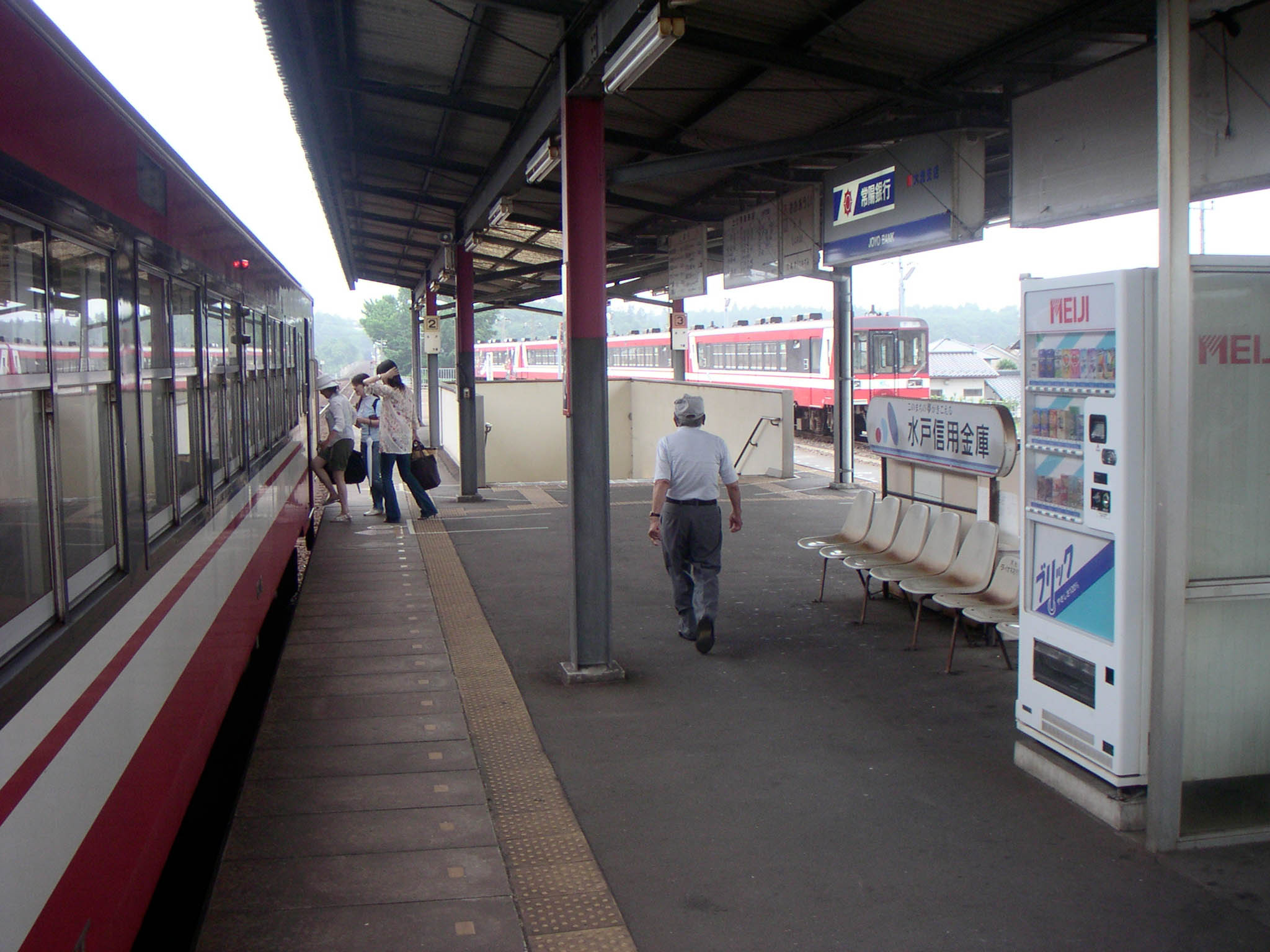
View of the platform, July 2005

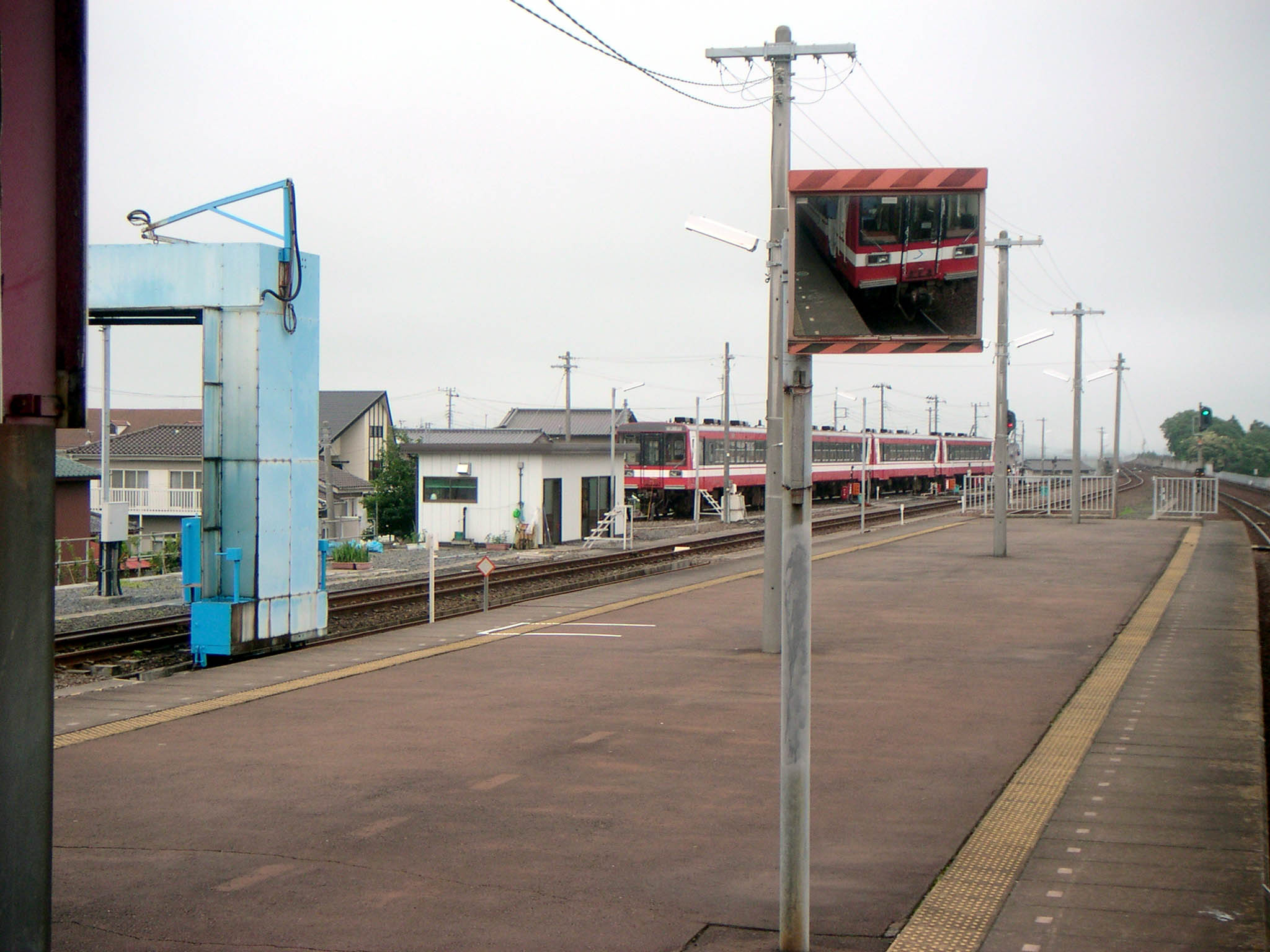
View of the line's depot from the platform, July 2005

== History ==
The station opened on 14 March 1985 with the opening of the Ōarai Kashima Line.

== Passenger statistics ==
In fiscal 2015, the station was used by an average of 2166 passengers daily.

== Surrounding area ==
- Ōarai town hall
- Ōarai Sun Beach
- Ōarai Marine Tower
- Aqua World
- Ōarai Isosaki Shrine
- National Route 51

== See also ==
- List of railway stations in Japan
