= Ibaraki Prefectural Museum of History =

Museum

- 茨城県立歴史館
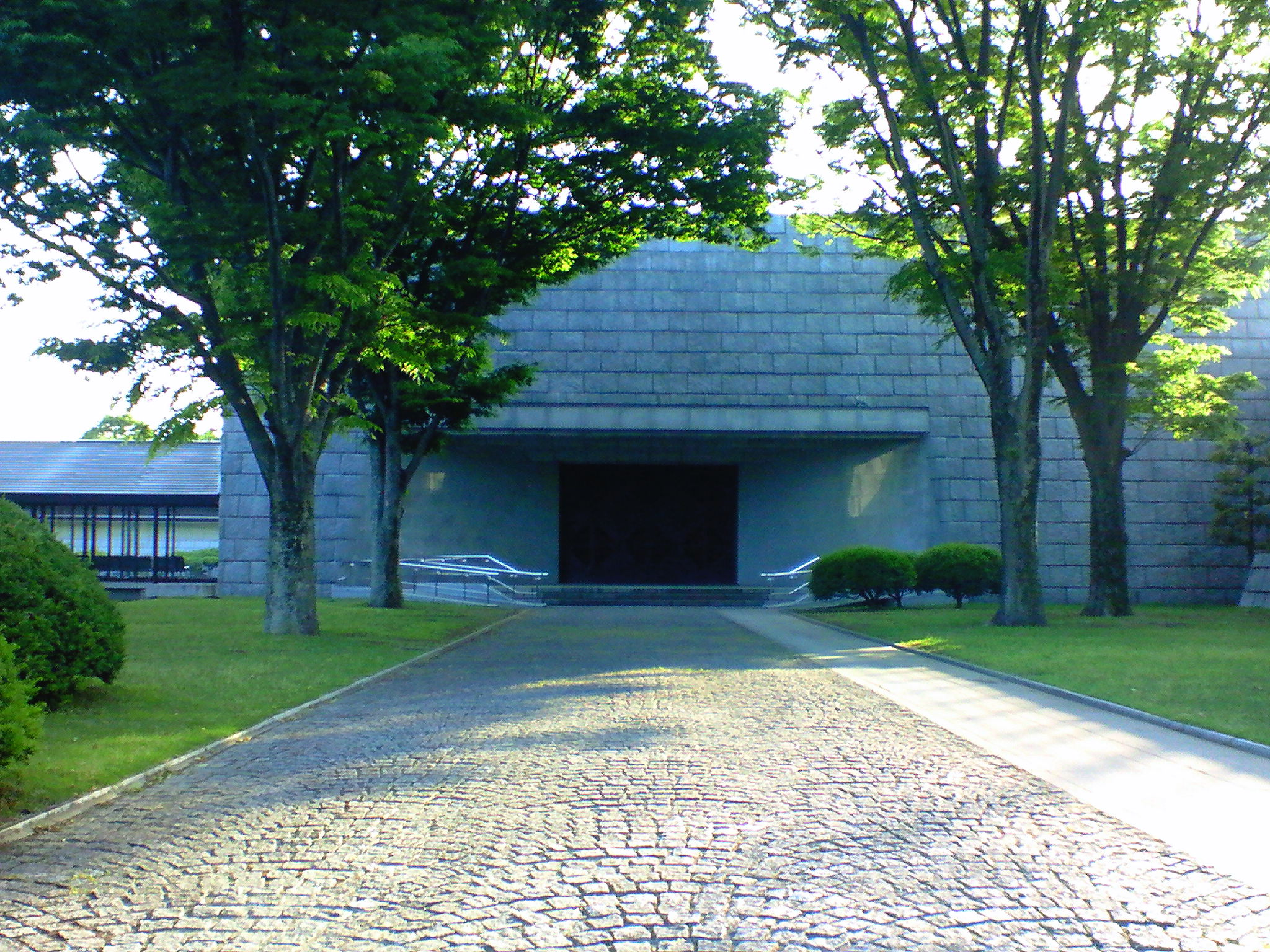
- Established: 3 September 1974
- Location: Midoricho 2-1-1, Mito, Ibaraki Prefecture, Japan 310-0034
- Coordinates: 36°22′45″N 140°27′00″E
- Type: History
- Accreditation: Ibaraki Prefectural Board of Education
- Collection size: 398,886
- Visitors: 93,976 (FY2007)
- Owner: Ibaraki Prefecture
- Website: www.rekishikan.museum.ibk.ed.jp/index.htm
- Building details

Technical details
- Floor area: 8,438 m^{2}

Design and construction
- Architect: Mori Kyosuke Architects

The Ibaraki Prefectural Museum of History (茨城県立歴史館, Ibaraki kenritsu rekishikan) is a local history museum in Mito, Ibaraki, Japan. It is one of Japan's many museums which are supported by a prefecture.

The museum opened in September 1974. The collection focuses on the history of Ibaraki and the grounds also include a number of Edo-period farm buildings and examples of western-style Japanese architecture from the Meiji period. The collection also houses numerous artworks, historical artifacts and extensive documentation from the Tokugawa clan, who ruled Mito Domain during the Edo period.

== See also ==
- Kōdōkan
- Kairaku-en
- Prefectural museum
