= Kairaku-en =

Japanese garden in Mito, Japan

- 偕楽園
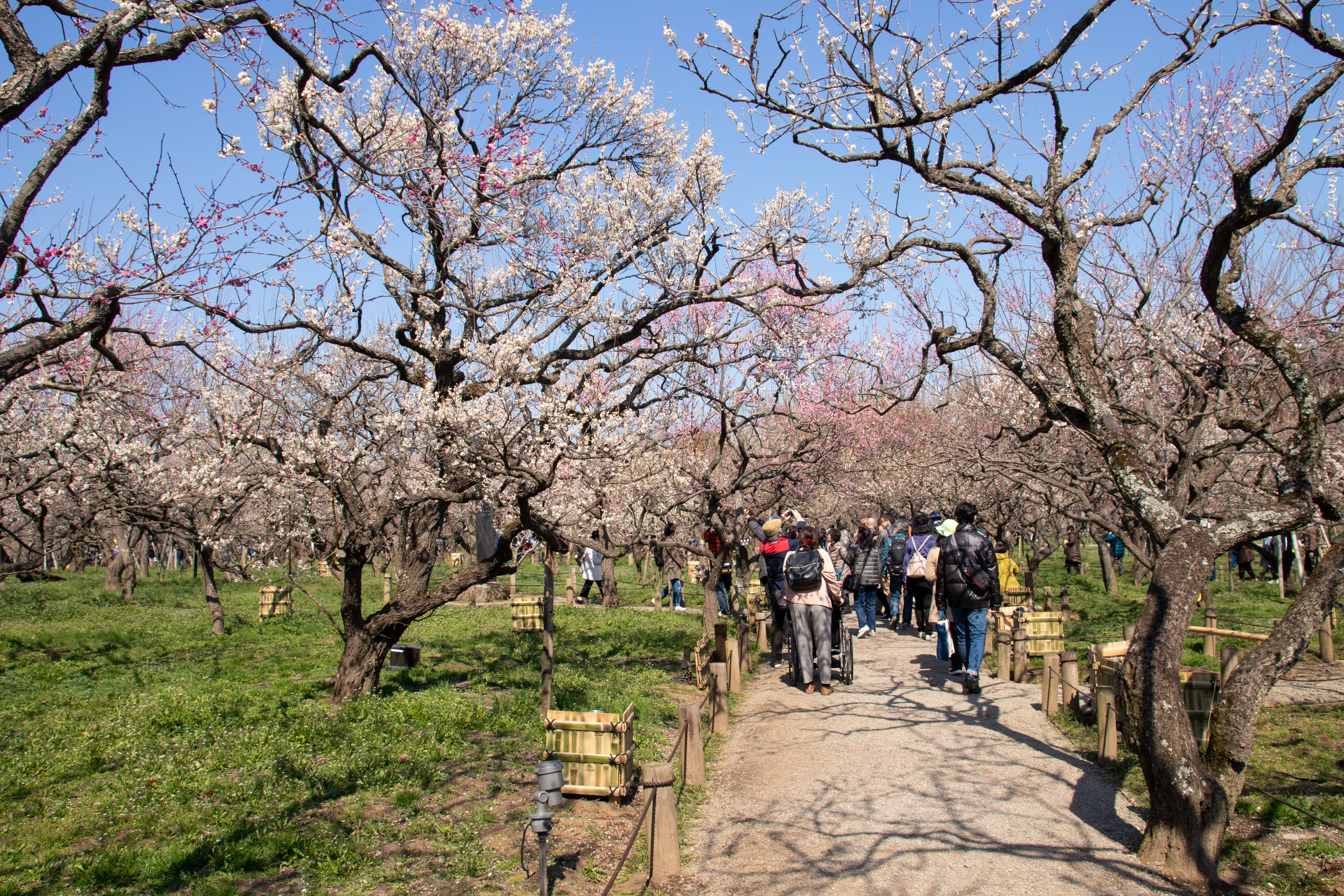

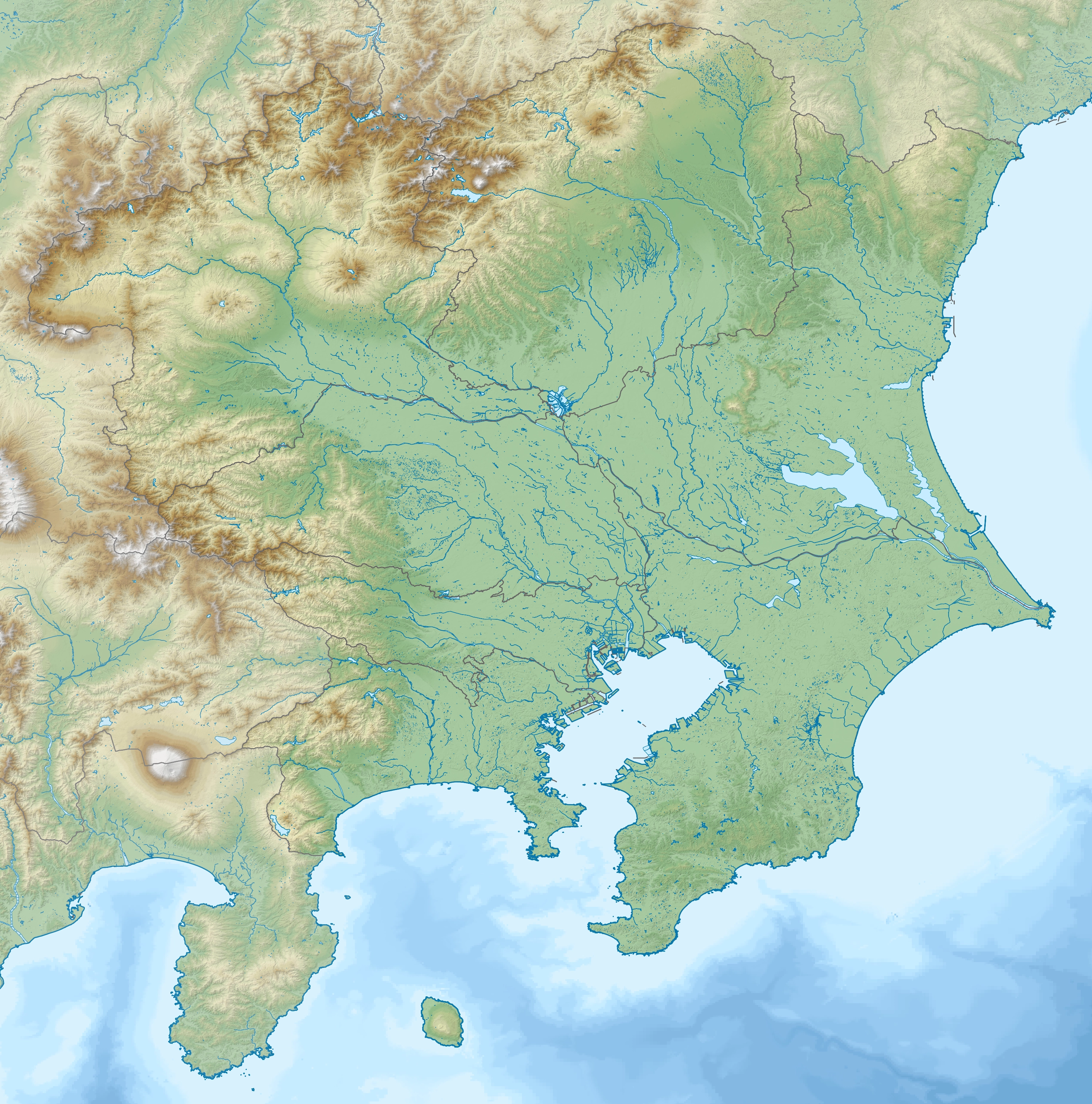
- Location within Ibaraki Prefecture Location within Kanto Area Location within Japan
- Type: Urban park
- Location: Mito, Ibaraki, Japan
- Coordinates: 36°22′23″N 140°27′22″E
- Area: 300 hectares (740 acres)
- Created: 1 July 1842
- National Historic Site of Japan National Place of Scenic Beauty

Kairaku-en (Japanese: 偕楽園; Kairakuen Park) is a Japanese garden located in Mito, Ibaraki Prefecture, Japan. Along with Kenroku-en and Koraku-en, it is considered one of the Three Great Gardens of Japan.

== Overview ==
Kairaku-en was built in the year 1842 by Tokugawa Nariaki, daimyō of Mito Domain. Unlike Japan's other two great gardens, Kairaku-en was originally intended to be enjoyed by the public, by which Tokugawa Nariaki meant the samurai class. Ordinary commoners were admitted only on certain dates each year. The gardens are especially noted for the plum blossom season, which usually takes place in late February and March. Besides the plum tree grove, where one hundred different plum tree varieties with white, pink and red blossoms are planted, Kairaku-en also features a bamboo grove, cedar grove, and the Kobuntei, a three-story pavilion for use in poetry contests and for the Japanese tea ceremony.

Following the Meiji restoration, the park became property of the Japanese government, and the Tokiwa Jinja, a Shinto shrine was built within its grounds. The garden was officially renamed Tokiwa Park in 1873. In 1922 it was designated a National Historic Site and also a National Place of Scenic Beauty. The Kobuntei pavilion burned down in 1945 during the bombing of Mito in World War II, but was restored in 1958. The name of the park was also officially changed to "Kairaku-en" in 1948. The total area of the park is 300 hectares. It is served by Kairaku-en Station on the JR East Jōban Line, but the station is only open during the plum blossom season. Sakurayama, noted for its cherry blossoms in April, is part of the park area, but is located on the opposite side of the train tracks.

== Four seasons ==
Kairaku-en is famous for its plum tree blossoms, which can be enjoyed year-round. In spring, the park also has a great deal of sakura, or cherry blossoms. The park is also famous for its koyo, or autumn leaves. The full area of the park is 58 hectares, and features a variety of different flora and fauna.

== Gallery ==
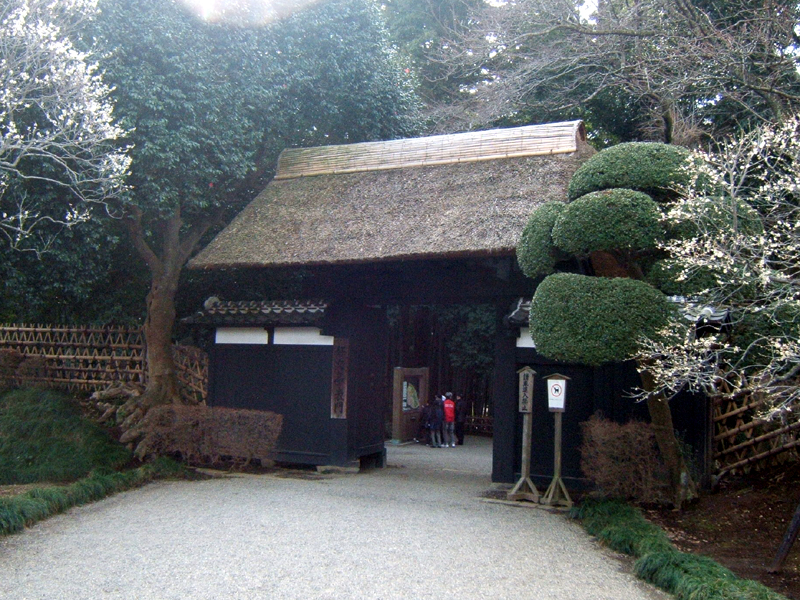
Old front gate

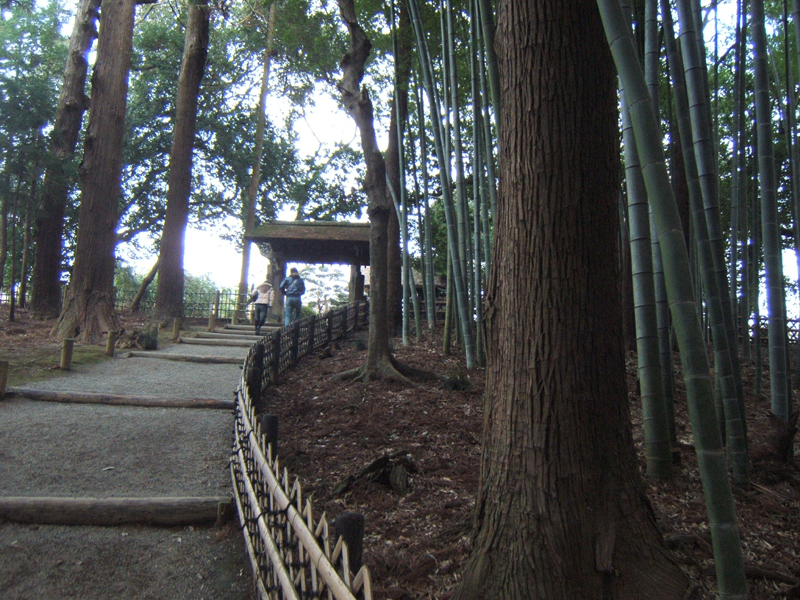
Bamboo grove and cedar woods

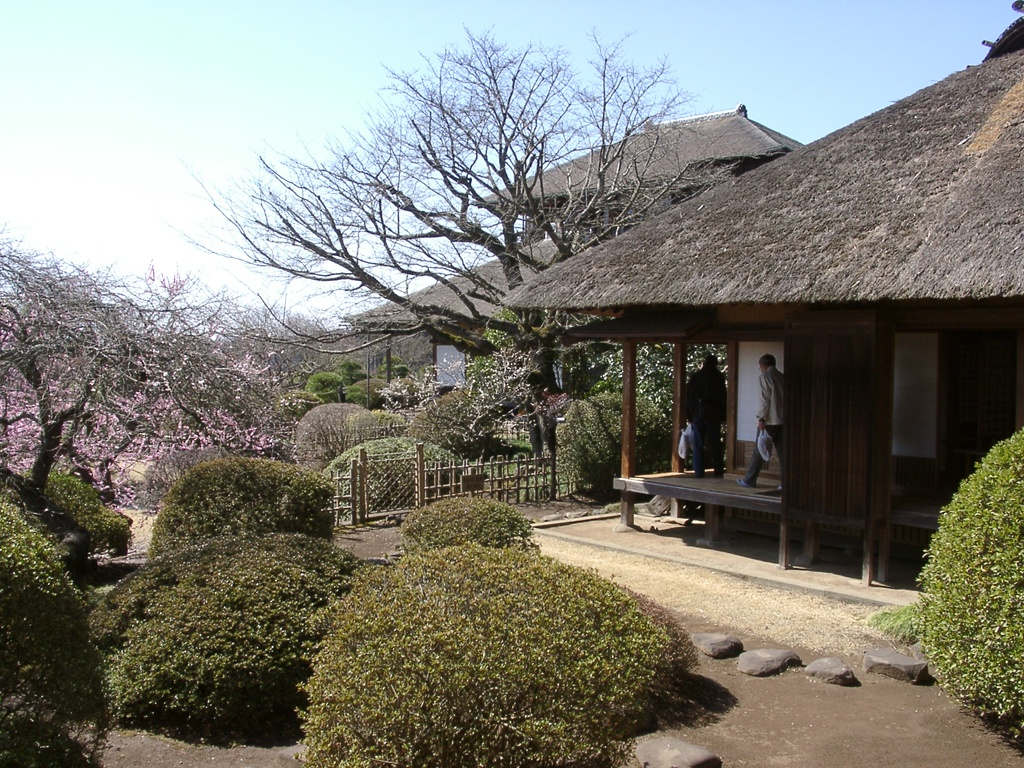
Kobuntei

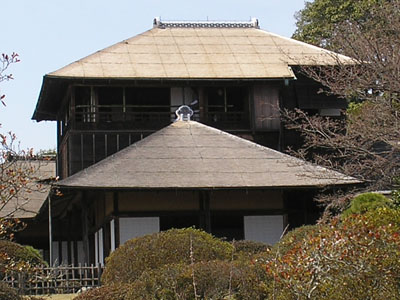
Kobuntei

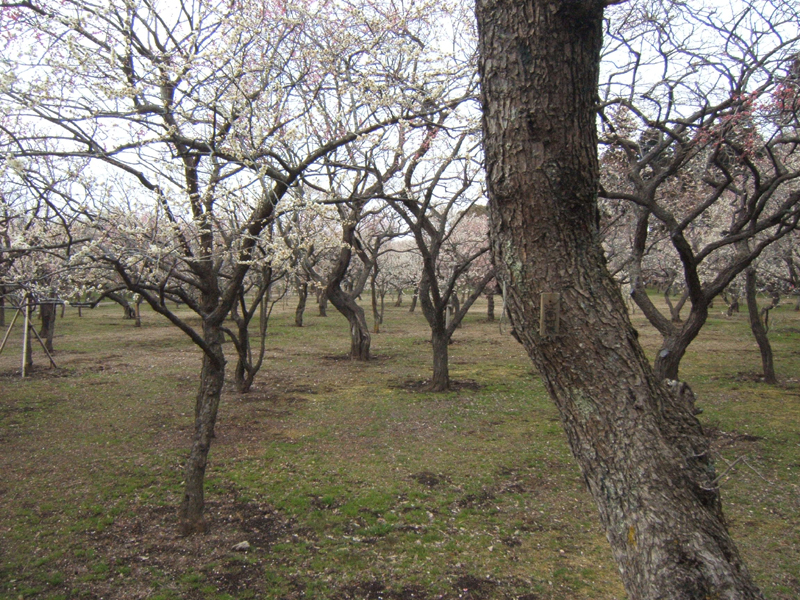
Plum trees

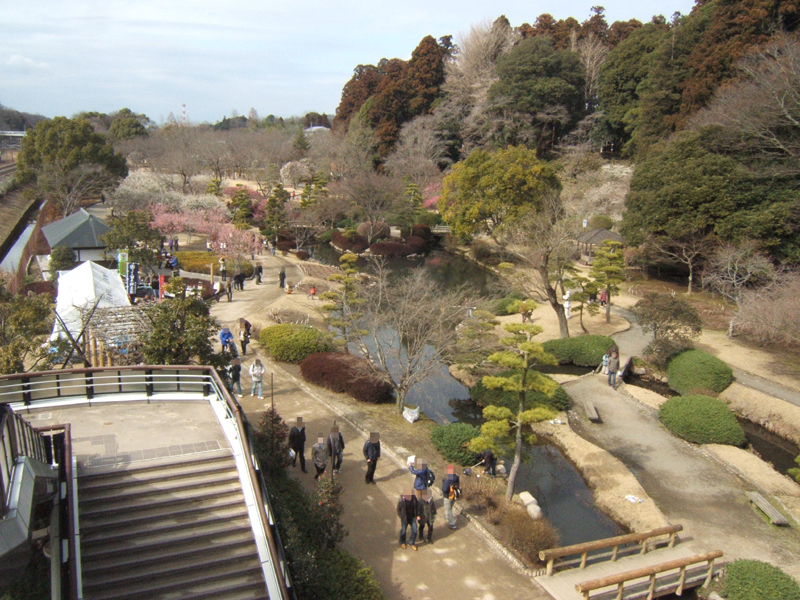
South garden

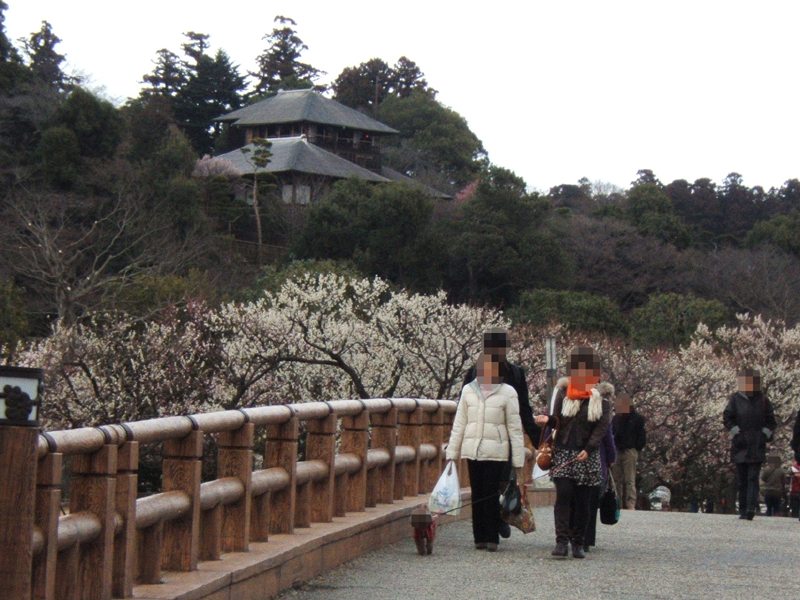
Kairaku-en Park and Kobuntei

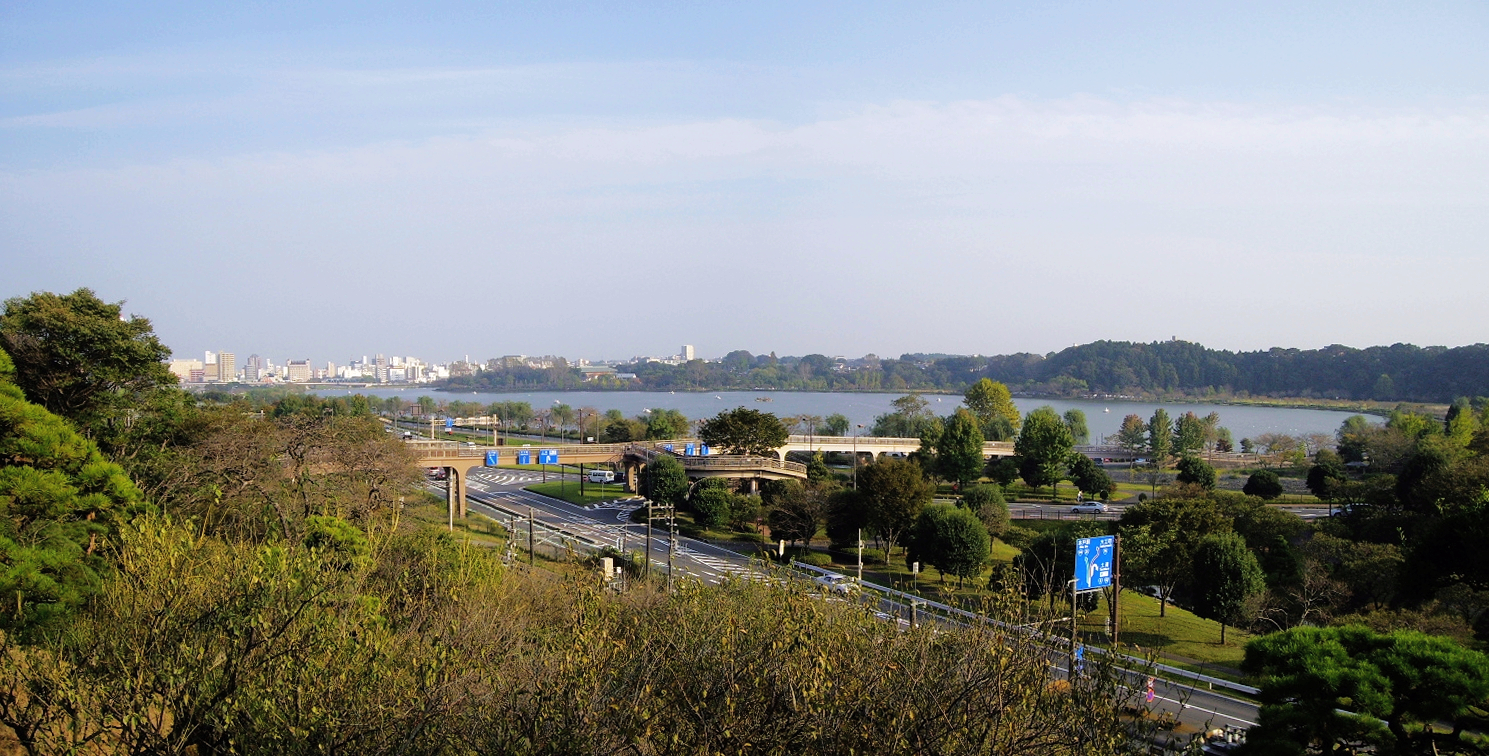
Lake Senba

== See also ==
- Kōdōkan
- List of Historic Sites of Japan (Ibaraki)
- List of Places of Scenic Beauty of Japan (Ibaraki)
