= Tokiwa shrine =

Shinto shrine in Mito, Japan

Tokiwa Jinja
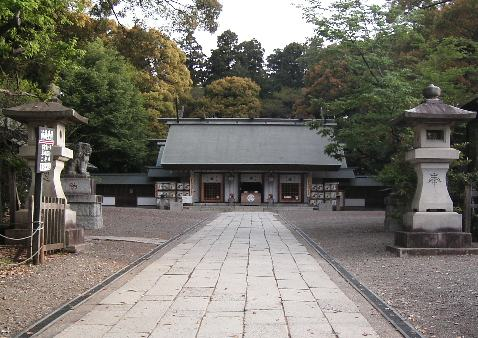
- Haiden

- Location within Japan

Religion
- Affiliation: Shinto

Location
- Location: 1-3-1 Tokiwa-cho, Mito-shi, Ibaraki-ken
- Interactive map of Tokiwa Jinja
- Coordinates: 36.3746°N 140.4556°E

Architecture
- Established: 1874

Website
- komonsan.jp/for_english/tokiwa_jinja_shrine.html

Tokiwa Jinja (常磐神社) is a Shinto shrine adjacent to the gardens of Kairakuen in Mito, Ibaraki, Japan. Founded in 1874, enshrined are Tokugawa Mitsukuni, second daimyō of the Mito Domain and compiler of Dai Nihonshi, and Tokugawa Nariaki, ninth lord and founder of the nearby Kōdōkan han school. In 1882 the shrine joined the ranks of the bekkaku kanpeisha (別格官幣社) or Imperial Shrines. The Tokiwa Jinja Reisai or annual festival is held on 12 May. A cannon and a drum have been designated as Cultural Properties by the city.

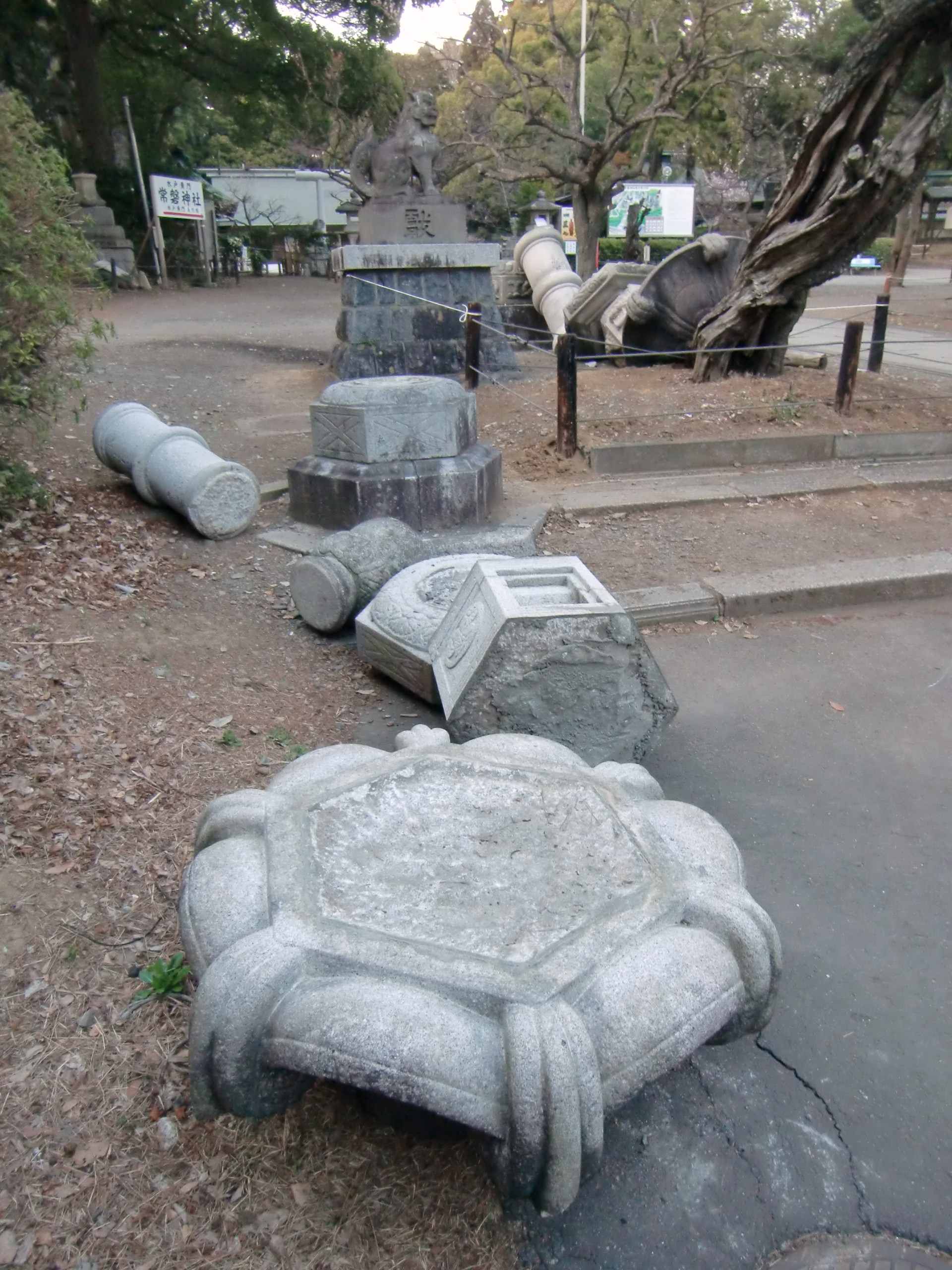
Tōrō toppled by the March 2011 Tōhoku earthquake

== See also ==
- Mito Domain
- Tokugawa clan
- Kōdōkan
- Tōshō-gū
- Modern system of ranked Shinto Shrines
