= Tsunezumi Station =

Railway station in Mito, Ibaraki Prefecture, Japan

Tsunezumi Station 常澄駅
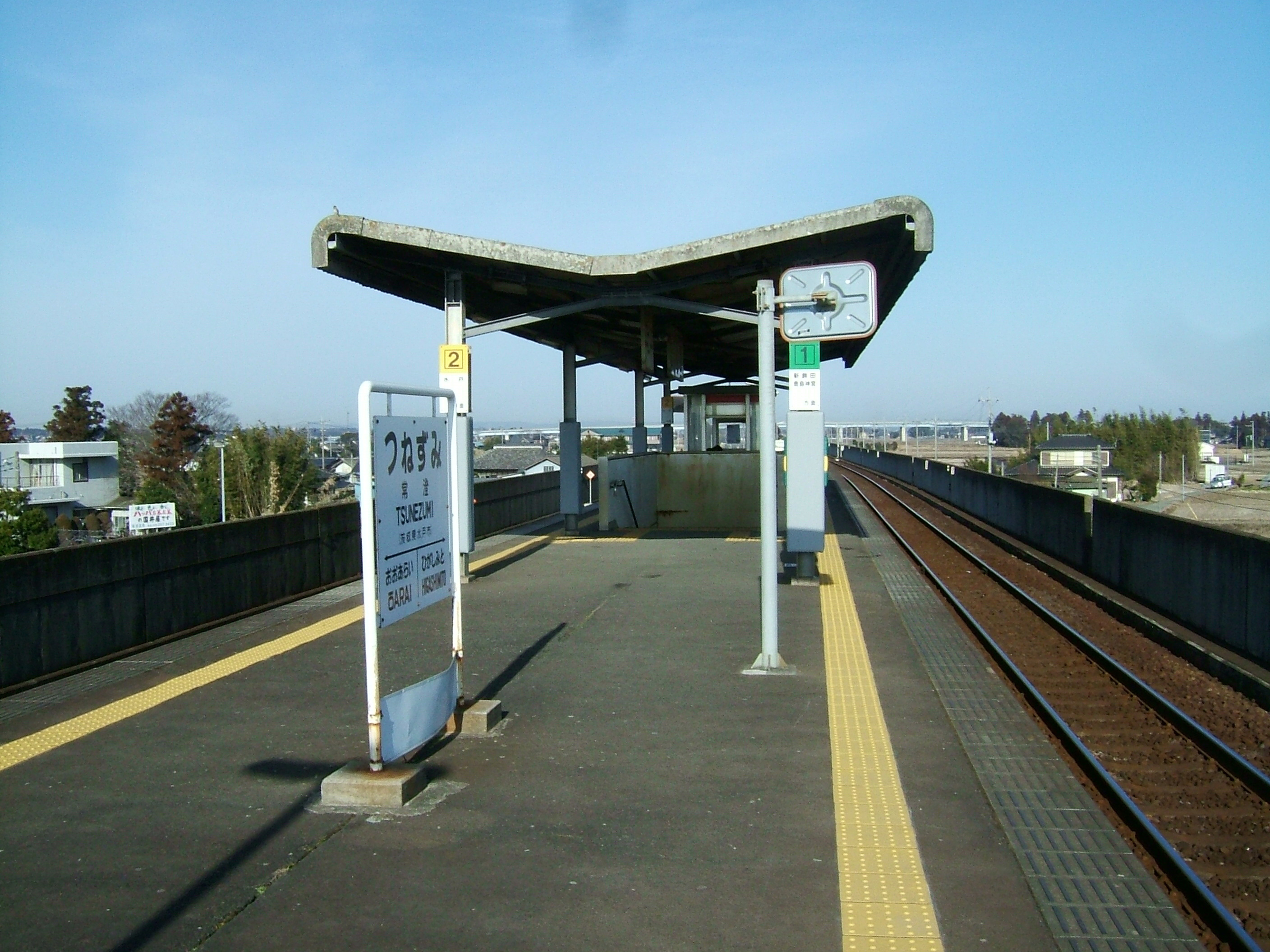
- Tsunezumi Station, March 2008

General information
- Location: Shiozaki-cho 3300-2, Mito-shi, Ibaraki-ken 311-1114; Japan
- Coordinates: 36.3409°N 140.5588°E
- Operator: Kashima Rinkai Tetsudo
- Line: ■ Ōarai-Kashima Line
- Platforms: 2 (1 island platform)
- Connections: Bus terminal

Construction
- Structure type: Elevated

Other information
- Status: Unstaffed
- Website: Official website

History
- Opened: 14 March 1985

Passengers
- FY2018: 743 daily

Services
| Preceding station | Kashima Rinkai Railway | Following station |
|---|---|---|
| Higashi-Mito towards Mito | Ōarai Kashima Line | Ōarai towards Kashimajingū |
Location
- Location within Ibaraki Prefecture Location within Japan

Tsunezumi Station (常澄駅, Tsunezumi-eki) is a passenger railway station in the city of Mito, Ibaraki Prefecture, Japan operated by the third sector Kashima Rinkai Railway.

== Lines ==
Tsunezumi Station is served by the Ōarai Kashima Line, and is located 8.3 km from the official starting point of the line at Mito Station.

== Station layout ==
The station consists of a single elevated island platform. The station is unattended.

=== Platforms ===
| 1 | ■ Ōarai Kashima Line | for Kashimajingū |
| 2 | ■ Ōarai Kashima Line | for Mito |

== History ==
Tsunezumi Station was opened on 14 March 1985 with the opening of the Ōarai Kashima Line.

== Passenger statistics ==
In fiscal 2018, the station was used by an average of 743 passengers daily.

== Surrounding area ==
- National Route 51
- National Route 245
- Tsunezumi Post Office

== See also ==
- List of railway stations in Japan
