= Lake Senba =

Lake in Mito, Ibaraki, Japan

- 千波湖 (Japanese)
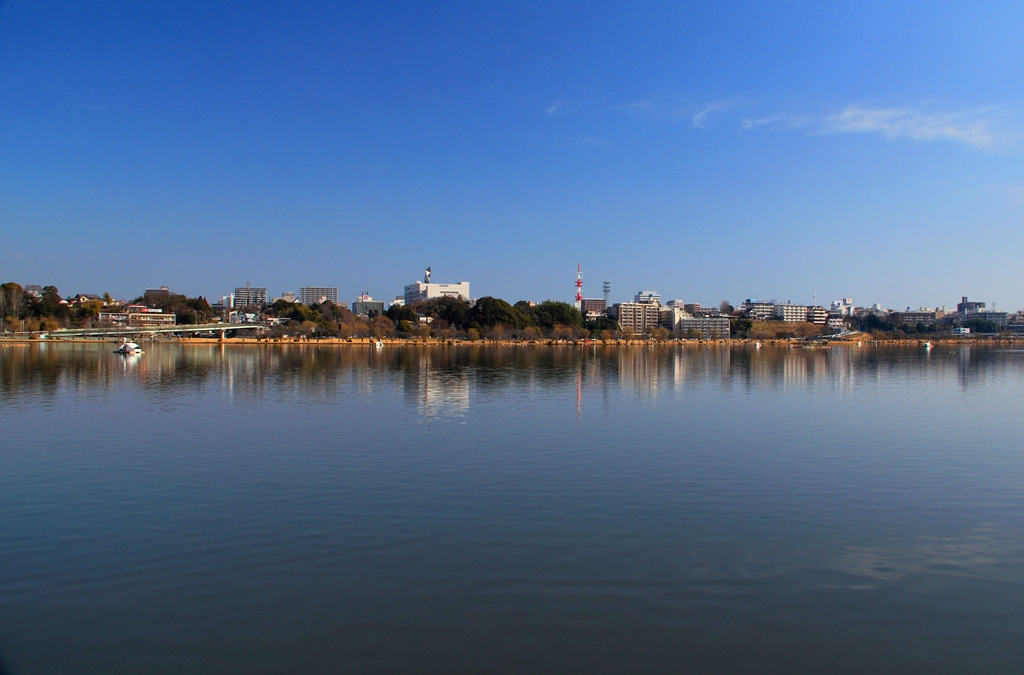

- Location within Ibaraki Prefecture Location within Japan
- Location: Ibaraki Prefecture, Honshū
- Coordinates: 36°22′12″N 140°27′35″E
- Basin countries: Japan

Lake Senba (千波湖, senbako) is a lake in Mito, Ibaraki, Japan.

The lake is part of Senba Park. It is located next to Kairaku-en, a large park built in the Edo period known for its large number of plum blossoms. The Ibaraki Prefectural Cultural Center is also located nearby, as is the Tokugawa Museum, and Gokoku Shrine.

In 1969 Hikone in Shiga Prefecture donated a pair of mute swans and in either 1978 or 1983 two Australian black swans were donated by Ube in Yamaguchi Prefecture. In 1987 Mito city donated black swans to Hikone city in Shiga Prefecture. As of 2019 one of them was still residing in the moat of Hikone Castle.

The lake is home to a large number of wild birds including descendants of the donated swans, eastern spot-billed ducks, little egrets, intermediate egrets, great egrets, kingfishers and more. During the winter tundra swans, whooper swans, Eurasian widgeons, mallards, common coots, white wagtails, black-headed gulls, herring gulls, great crested grebes, little grebes, moorhens, northern pintails, pochards and other species can be seen.

Black swans and mute swans in particular breed near the lake. During the winter of 2016-2017 at least 56 wild birds died of avian influenza. It was reported in 2017 that Mito city was placing decoy eggs in nests near lake Senba to gradually reduce the population over time.
