= Kōdōkan (Mito) =

- 弘道館
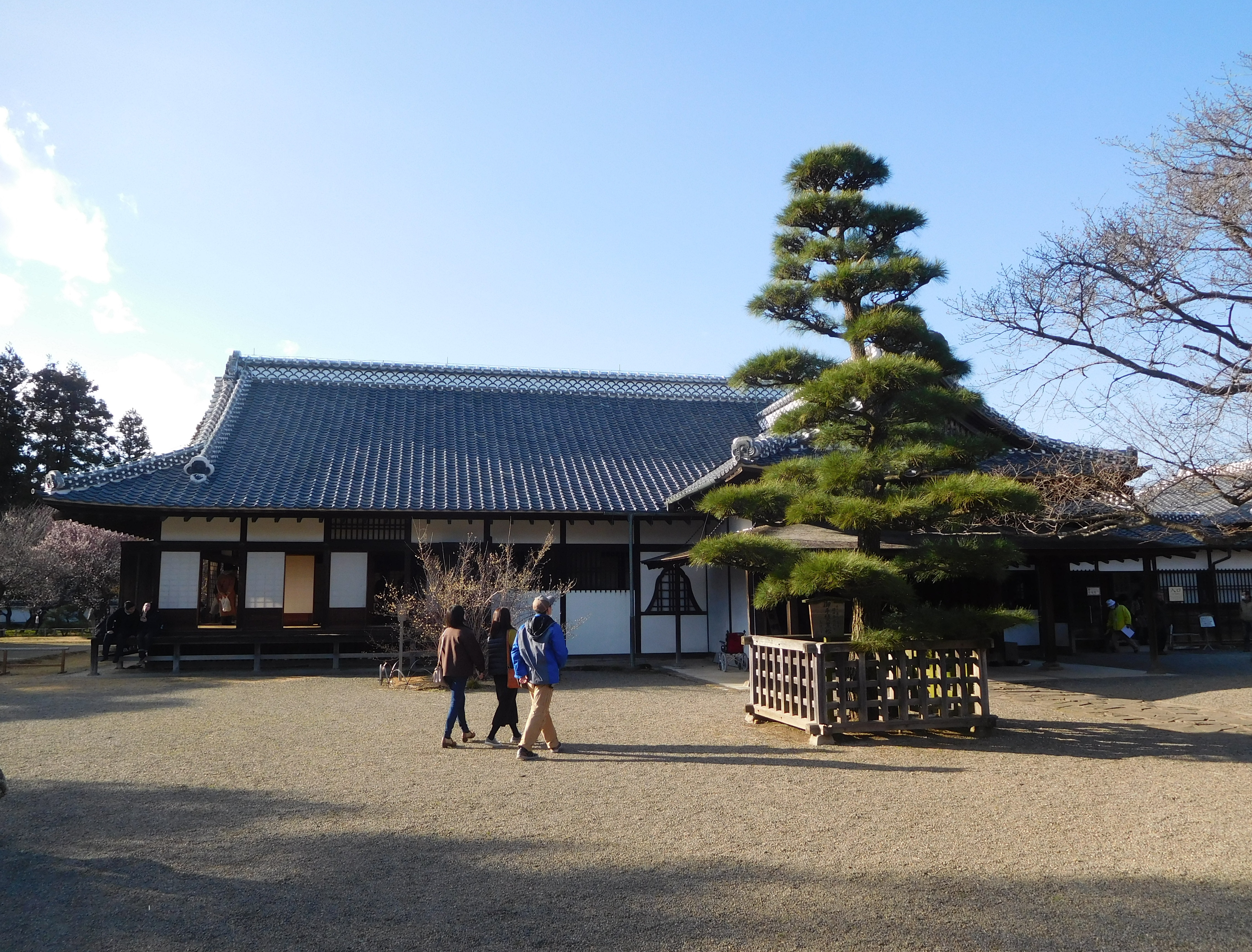
- The Seichō building of the Mito Kōdōkan, founded in 1841, today an Important Cultural Property

- Location within Ibaraki Prefecture Location within Japan

General information
- Architectural style: Shoin-zukuri
- Location: 1 Chome-6-29 Sannomaru, Mito, Ibaraki 310-0011, Japan
- Coordinates: 36°22′31″N 140°28′37″E
- Inaugurated: 1841

The Kōdōkan (弘道館) was the largest han school in Bakumatsu period Japan. Located in Mito, Ibaraki Prefecture, three of its buildings have been designated Important Cultural Properties and the school is a Special Historic Site.

== History ==
The Kōdōkan was founded in 1841 by Tokugawa Nariaki, ninth daimyō of Mito Domain.

Tokugawa Nariaki was a leading figure in the late Tokugawa shogunate and a strong proponent of efforts to defend the country against encroaching foreigners. His pro-sonnō jōi views often were at odds with the tairō Ii Naosuke and he was also influenced by the nativist kokugaku philosophy, both of which laid the foundations of the Meiji Restoration as well as the development of State Shinto. The academy he founded in Mito also promoted to Mitogaku school established by Tokugawa Mitsukuni. It was located in the third bailey of Mito Castle, and construction work on its buildings was not completed until 1857.

Admission was at age 15; however, in line with Mito Domain's philosophy on education, classes were open to all ages provided that academic ability was above a certain level. The number of days a student attended was also dependent on his social standing. The curriculum included widespread topics, including medicine, mathematics, astronomy, Confucianism, history, music, and military arts.

From 1863 to 1864, the Kōdōkan was the epicenter of the Mito rebellion, a civil war within Mito Domain which involved an uprising and terrorist actions against the central power of the Shogunate by proponents of more rapid and direct action against the foreign powers. In April 1868, Tokugawa Yoshinobu (who was himself a native of Mito Domain and once a student at the Kōdōkan), abdicated his position as Shogun and was ordered by the new Meiji government to retire under house arrest to a building within the Kōdōkan. However, the situation in Mito Domain was very unstable during the Boshin War, and he was ordered to relocate to Shizuoka a few months later. The Meiji government's fears were well-founded, as only a few months after he relocated, survivors of the Battle of Aizu barricaded themselves within the Kōdōkan. In the ensuing battle with government troops, many of the structures in the school were damaged or destroyed.

The school closed in 1872 after the Meiji Restoration and the introduction of the new school system and the site was designated as a public park. Most of the library was taken over by the Mito High School, were destroyed by the air raid on Mito (水戸空襲) on August 2, 1945. The park is planted with some 60 varieties of Prunus mume, some of which date from the time of Tokugawa Nariaki. The Kōdōkan was designated as a national historic site in 1922 and became a special historic site in 1952.It is about a 10-minute walk from Mito Station on the JR East Joban Line.

Some of the buildings were damaged in the 2011 Tōhoku earthquake and tsunami.

== Notable buildings ==
- Seimon (正門) (1841) (ICP) Main gate, pillars have bullet holes from the 1868 battle
- Seichō (正庁) (1841) (ICP) The administration complex of the Kōdōkan. It includes the Bunkan (consisting of four dormitories for studying, training, and boarding), a training ground sword practice, and ground for martial arts training.
- Shizendō (至善堂) (1841) (ICP) Four rooms located in the northeast of the main office. wereused as a waiting room for the daimyo and a place for learning for his children

== Gallery ==
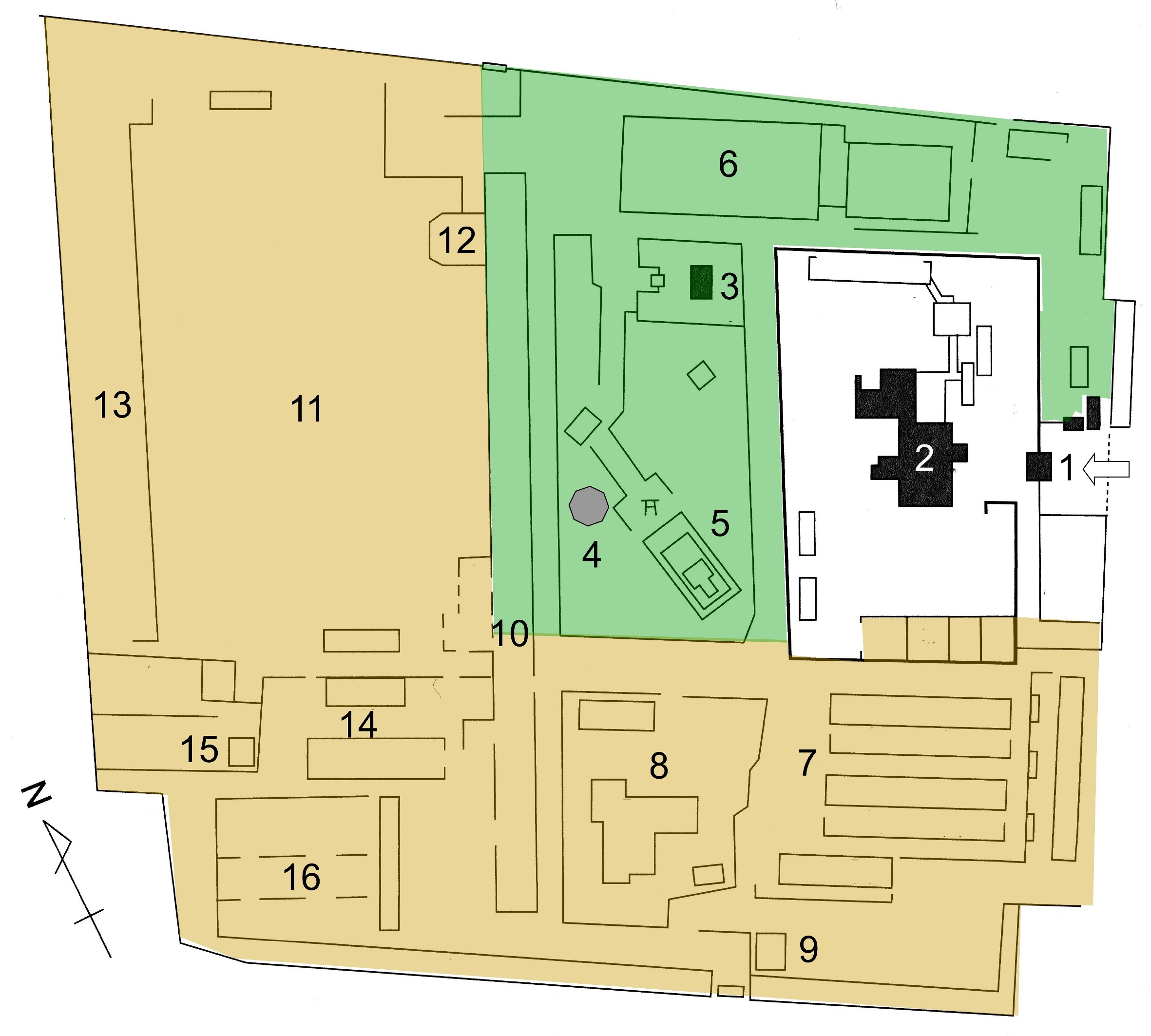
Map of the Kōdōkan

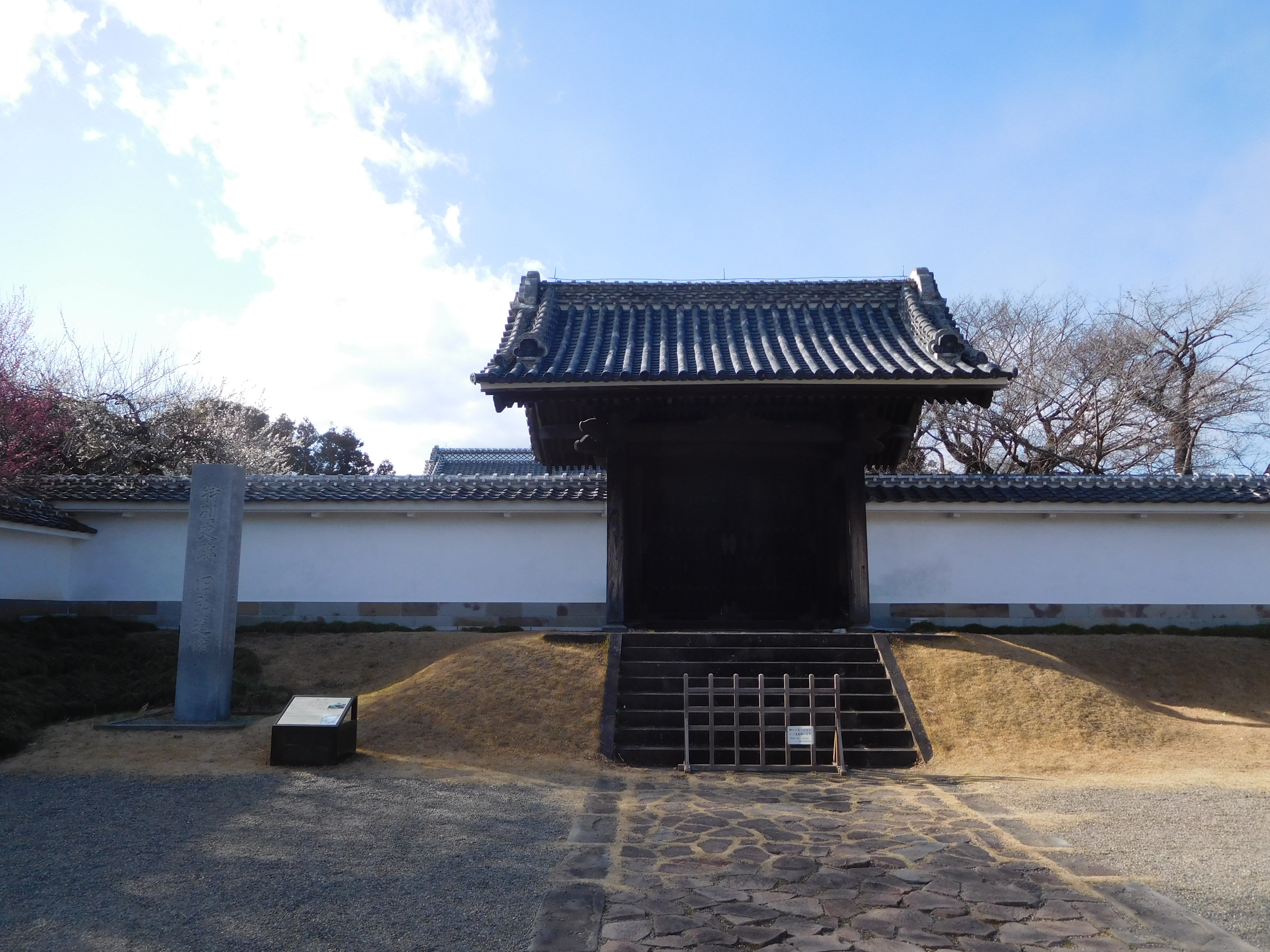
Seimon

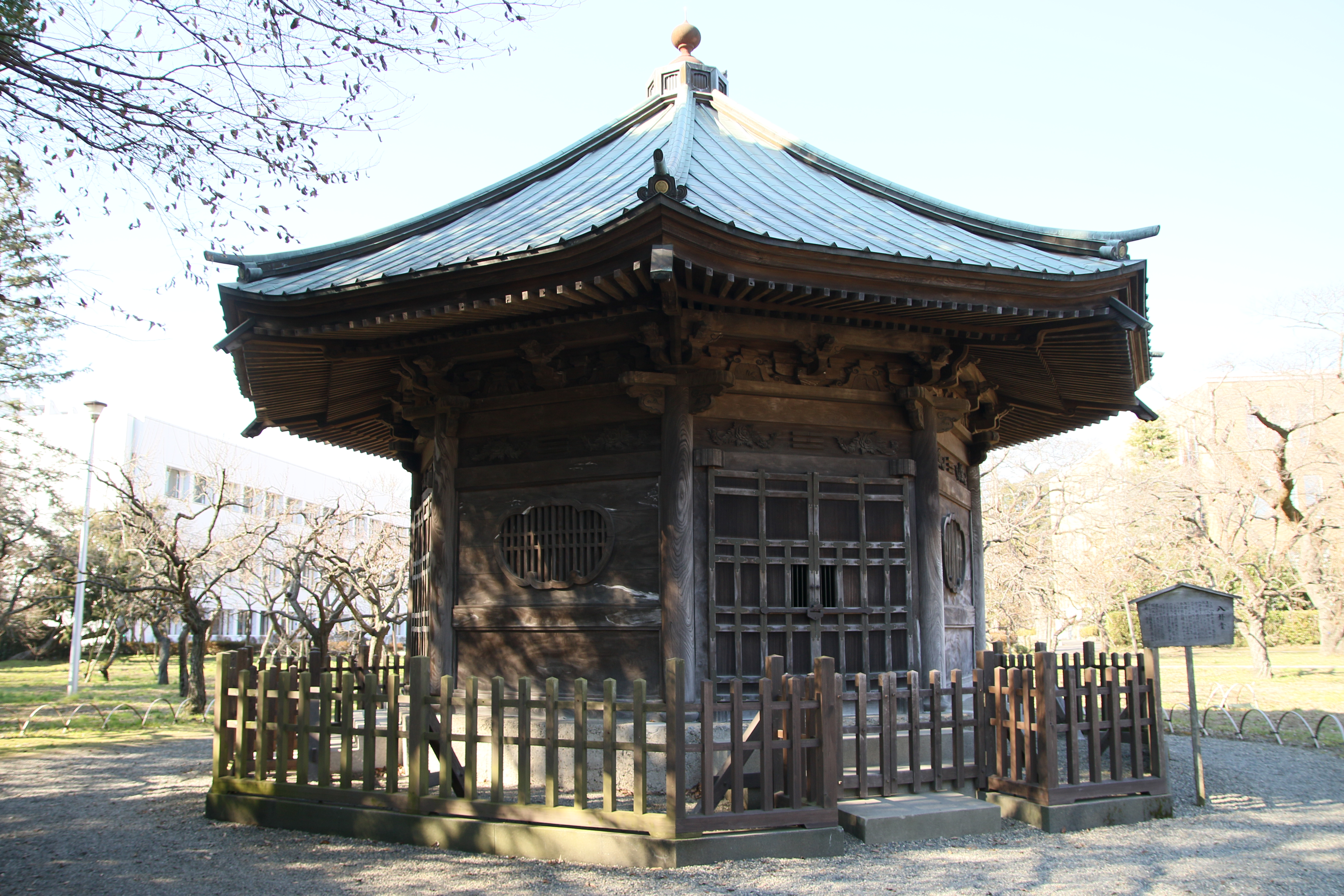
Octagonal chapel

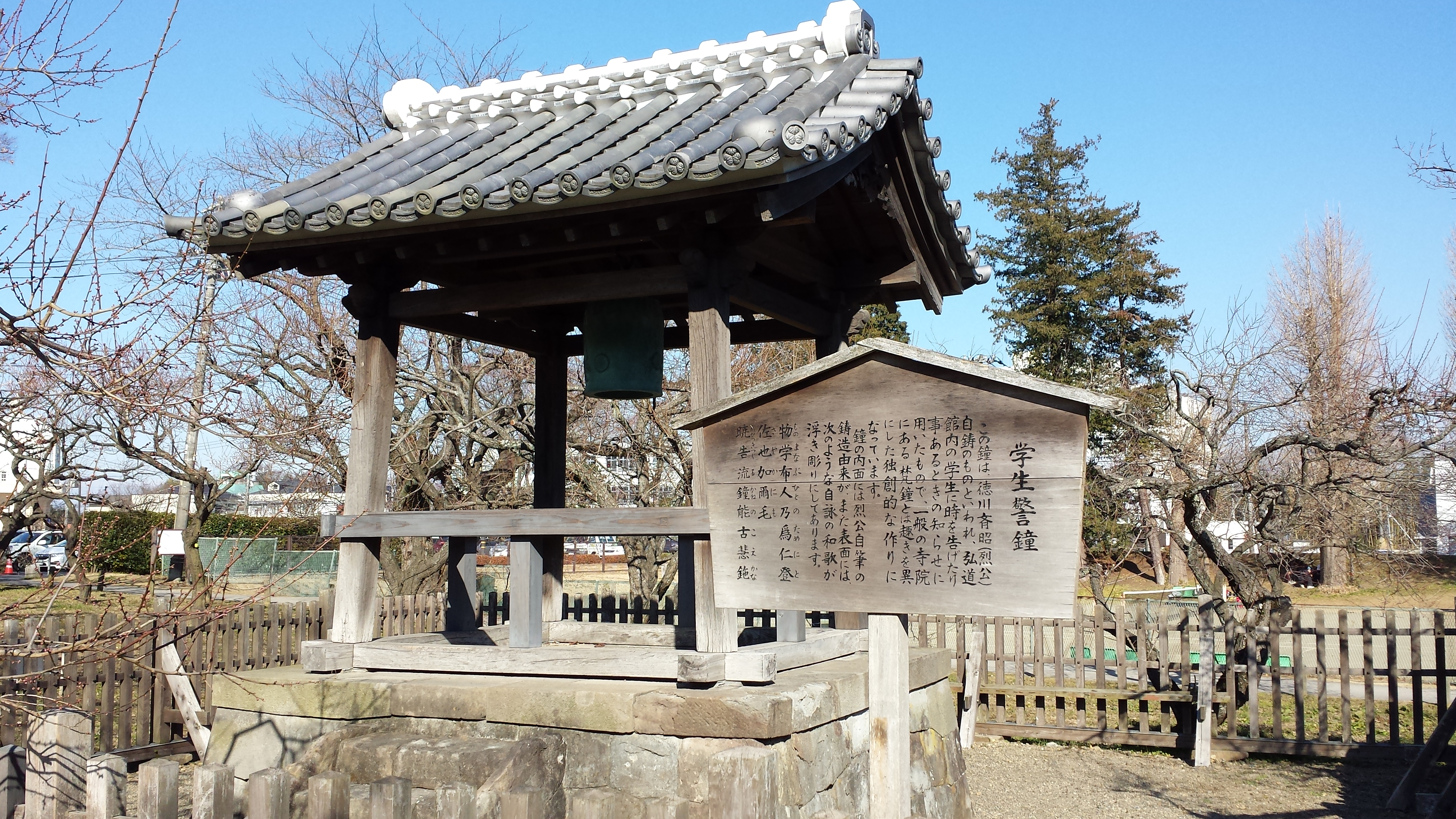
Belfry

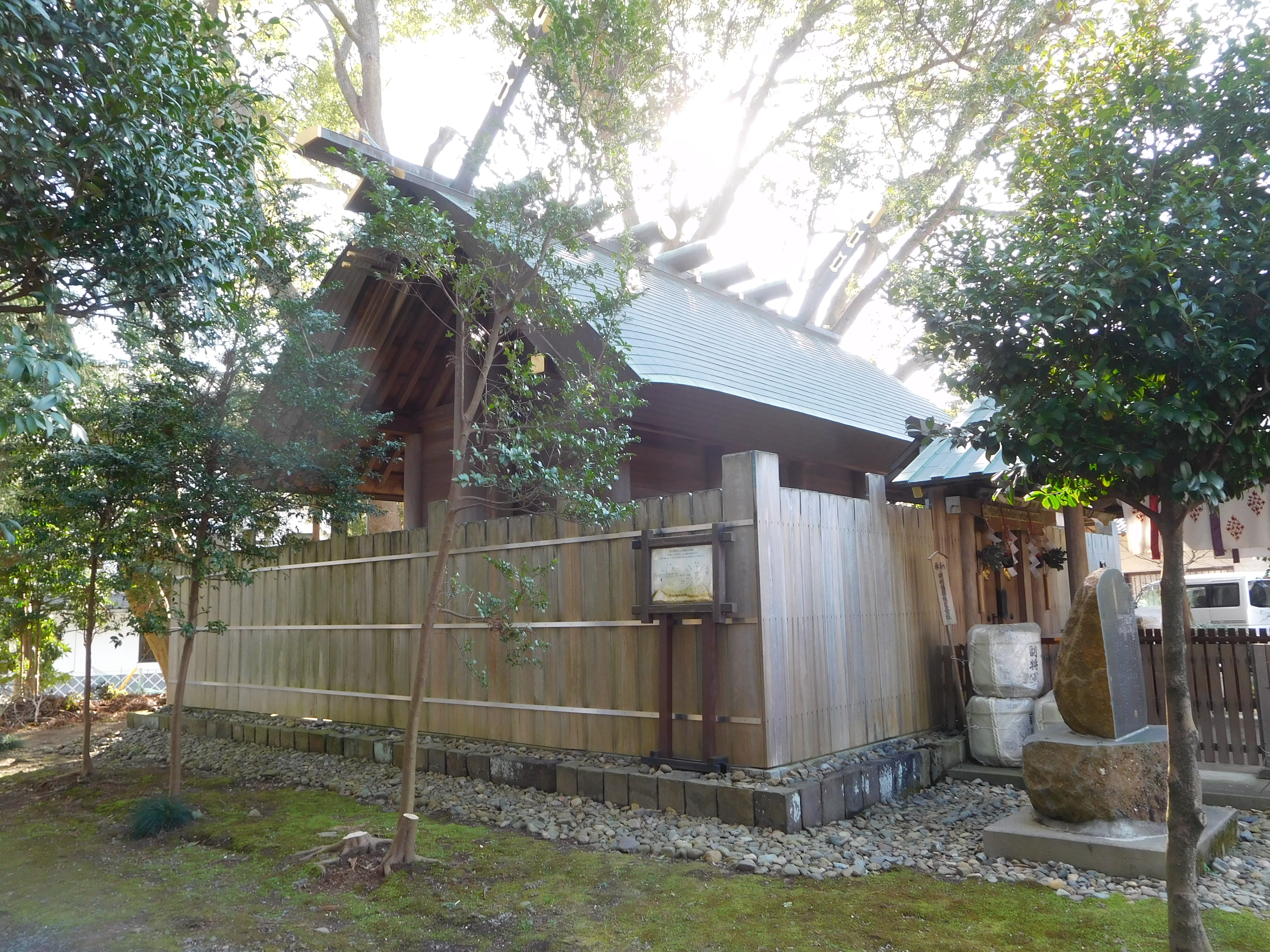
Kashima Shrine

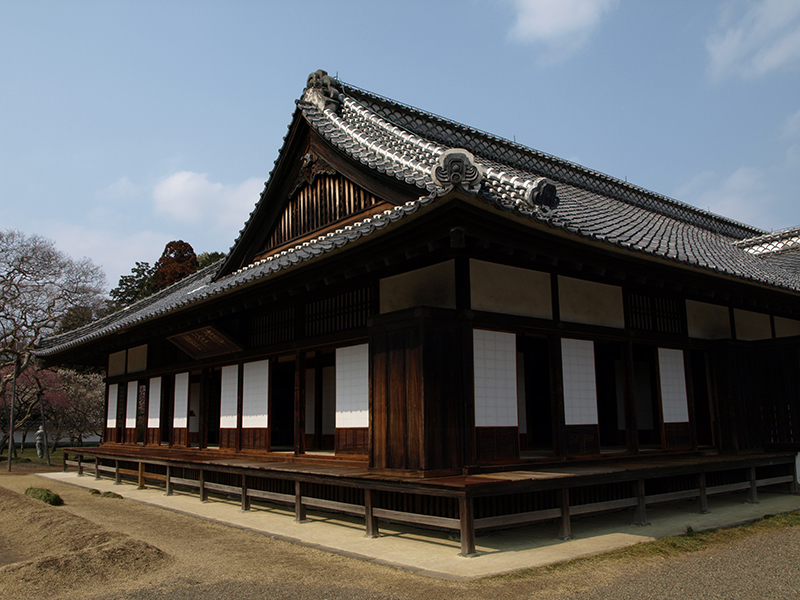
Seichō

== See also ==
- List of Historic Sites of Japan (Ibaraki)
- History of education in Japan
- Meirinkan
- Shizutani School
