= Mito, Ibaraki =

Mito 水戸市
- Prefecture capital and Core city
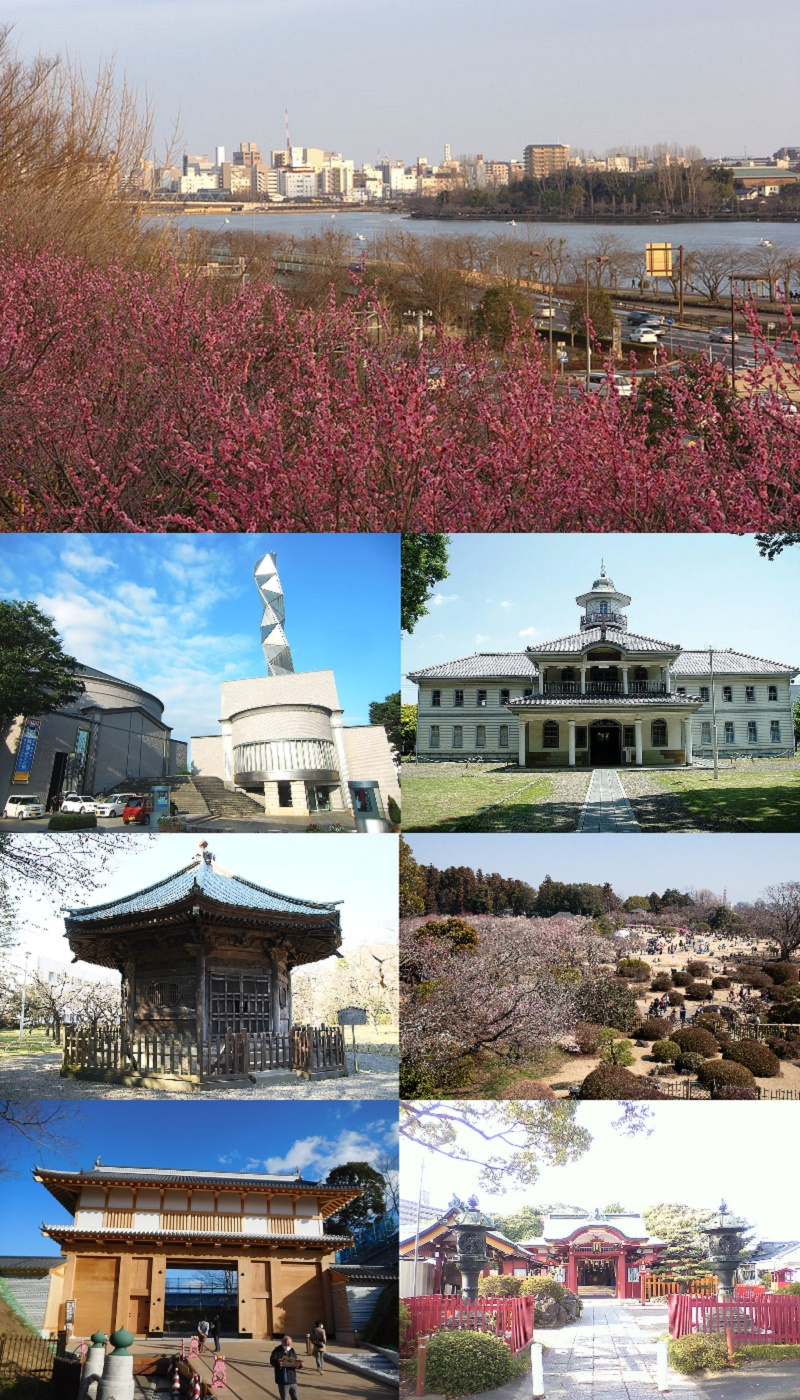
Lake Senba and central Mito
Mito Art Center	Ibaraki Prefectural Museum of History
Kōdōkan	Kairaku-en
Mito Castle	Mito Tōshō-gū
- Flag Seal
- Interactive map of Mito
- Coordinates: 36°21′57″N 140°28′16.5″E
- Country: Japan
- Region: Kantō
- Prefecture: Ibaraki

Area
  - Total: 217.32 km^{2} (83.91 sq mi)

Population (January 2024)
  - Total: 268,036
  - Density: 1,233.4/km^{2} (3,194.4/sq mi)
- Time zone: UTC+9 (Japan Standard Time)
- Tree: Prunus mume
- Flower: Bush clover (hagi)
- Bird: White wagtail
- Phone number: 029-224-1111
- Address: 1-4-1 Chūō, Mito-shi, Ibaraki-ken 310−8610
- Website: Official website

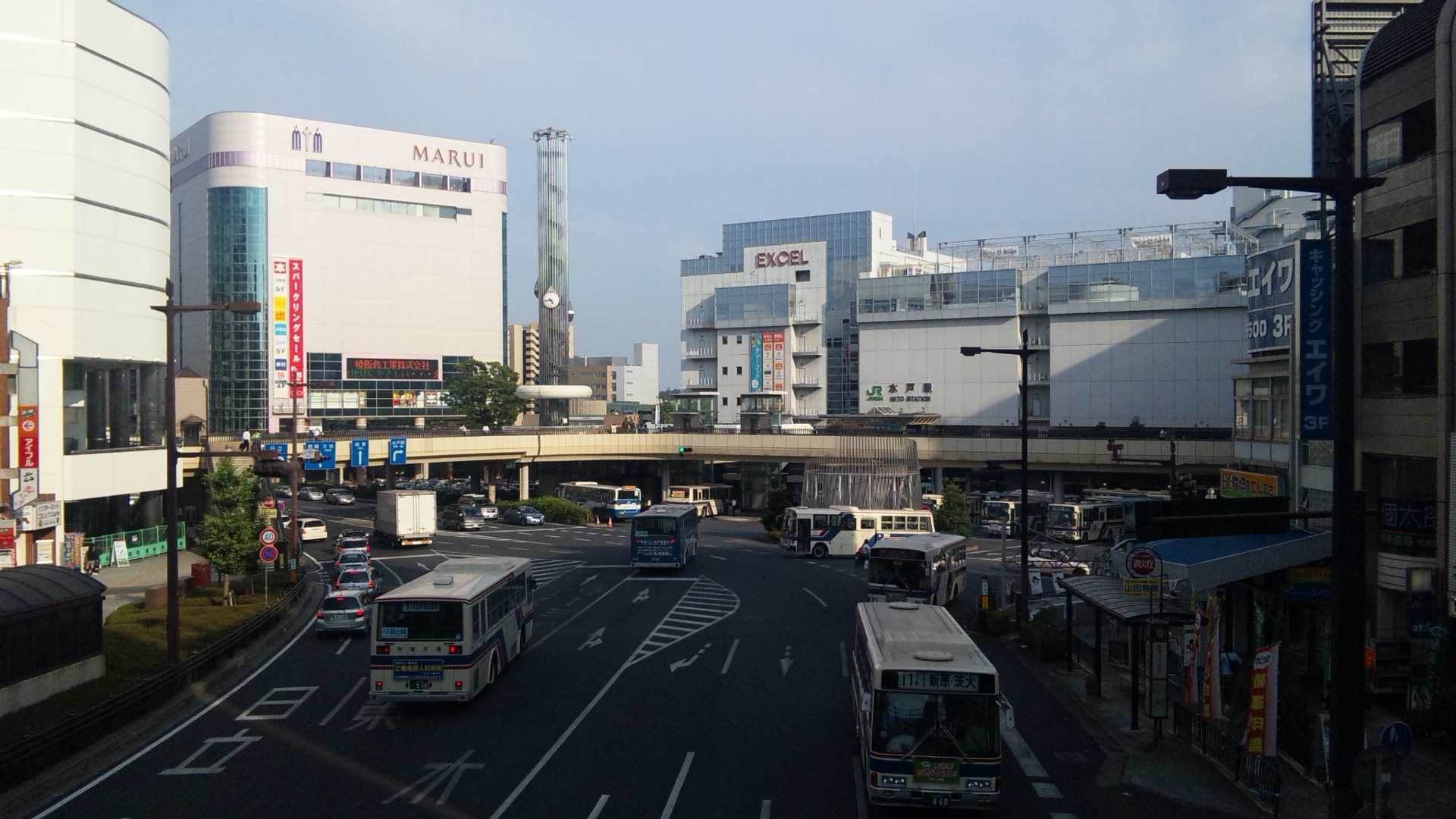
Plaza outside north exit of Mito Station

Mito (水戸市, Mito-shi; Japanese pronunciation: [mʲì.tó̞(.ɕì)]) is the capital city of Ibaraki Prefecture, in the northern Kantō region of Japan. As of 1 January 2024, the city had an estimated population of 268,036 in 126,055 households and a population density of 1,233 persons per km^{2}. The percentage of the population aged over 65 was 27.1%. The total area of the city is 217.32 square kilometres (83.91 sq mi).

== Geography ==
Mito is located in central Ibaraki Prefecture. Mito Station is about 10 km inland from the Pacific Ocean which Naka River, flowing from the north to the east of the city, pours into. Immediately south is Lake Senba, a recreational area. A main street extends from Mito Station to the west, and residential areas to the south and the west in particular.

=== Surrounding municipalities ===
Ibaraki Prefecture

- Hitachinaka
- Ibaraki
- Kasama
- Naka
- Ōarai
- Shirosato

=== Climate ===
Mito has a Humid subtropical climate (Köppen Cfa) characterized by warm summers and cold winters with light snowfall. The average annual temperature in Mito is 13.6 °C. The average annual rainfall is 1353.8 mm with September as the wettest month. The temperatures are highest on average in August, at around 25.2 °C, and lowest in January, at around 3.0 °C.

Climate data for Mito (1991−2020 normals, extremes 1897−present)
Month	Jan	Feb	Mar	Apr	May	Jun	Jul	Aug	Sep	Oct	Nov	Dec	Year
Record high °C (°F)	23.8 (74.8)	24.3 (75.7)	25.9 (78.6)	31.0 (87.8)	33.4 (92.1)	36.2 (97.2)	38.4 (101.1)	38.4 (101.1)	36.9 (98.4)	33.1 (91.6)	26.2 (79.2)	25.0 (77.0)	38.4 (101.1)
Mean maximum °C (°F)	14.9 (58.8)	17.9 (64.2)	21.5 (70.7)	25.7 (78.3)	29.0 (84.2)	31.2 (88.2)	34.7 (94.5)	35.5 (95.9)	32.9 (91.2)	27.8 (82.0)	22.1 (71.8)	17.7 (63.9)	36.0 (96.8)
Mean daily maximum °C (°F)	9.2 (48.6)	9.8 (49.6)	13.0 (55.4)	17.8 (64.0)	22.0 (71.6)	24.5 (76.1)	28.5 (83.3)	30.0 (86.0)	26.4 (79.5)	21.2 (70.2)	16.3 (61.3)	11.4 (52.5)	19.2 (66.6)
Daily mean °C (°F)	3.3 (37.9)	4.1 (39.4)	7.4 (45.3)	12.3 (54.1)	17.0 (62.6)	20.3 (68.5)	24.2 (75.6)	25.6 (78.1)	22.1 (71.8)	16.6 (61.9)	10.8 (51.4)	5.6 (42.1)	14.1 (57.4)
Mean daily minimum °C (°F)	−1.8 (28.8)	−1.2 (29.8)	2.1 (35.8)	7.0 (44.6)	12.5 (54.5)	17.0 (62.6)	21.0 (69.8)	22.2 (72.0)	18.6 (65.5)	12.5 (54.5)	5.9 (42.6)	0.5 (32.9)	9.7 (49.5)
Mean minimum °C (°F)	−6.0 (21.2)	−5.7 (21.7)	−3.3 (26.1)	0.2 (32.4)	6.4 (43.5)	12.1 (53.8)	17.0 (62.6)	18.2 (64.8)	12.3 (54.1)	5.7 (42.3)	−0.2 (31.6)	−4.4 (24.1)	−6.4 (20.5)
Record low °C (°F)	−12.0 (10.4)	−12.7 (9.1)	−9.0 (15.8)	−3.5 (25.7)	−0.1 (31.8)	7.3 (45.1)	10.2 (50.4)	12.7 (54.9)	7.9 (46.2)	−0.5 (31.1)	−4.7 (23.5)	−8.2 (17.2)	−12.7 (9.1)
Average precipitation mm (inches)	54.5 (2.15)	53.8 (2.12)	102.8 (4.05)	116.7 (4.59)	144.5 (5.69)	135.7 (5.34)	141.8 (5.58)	116.9 (4.60)	186.3 (7.33)	185.4 (7.30)	79.7 (3.14)	49.6 (1.95)	1,367.7 (53.85)
Average snowfall cm (inches)	4 (1.6)	6 (2.4)	1 (0.4)	0 (0)	0 (0)	0 (0)	0 (0)	0 (0)	0 (0)	0 (0)	0 (0)	1 (0.4)	12 (4.7)
Average precipitation days (≥ 0.5 mm)	5.5	6.0	10.5	11.3	12.2	13.0	12.5	9.4	11.8	12.0	8.0	5.9	118.1
Average relative humidity (%)	63	63	66	70	74	81	82	81	81	79	75	68	74
Mean monthly sunshine hours	195.4	174.3	182.7	183.5	186.1	137.8	150.8	179.4	138.7	140.6	153.7	178.0	2,000.8
Source: Japan Meteorological Agency

== Demographics ==
Per Japanese census data, the population of Mito has steadily increased over the past century.

Historical population
Year	Pop.	±%
1950	141,154	—
1960	162,160	+14.9%
1970	195,818	+20.8%
1980	239,742	+22.4%
1990	260,456	+8.6%
2000	261,562	+0.4%
2010	268,750	+2.7%
2020	270,685	+0.7%

== History ==
The Yamato people settled in Mito around the 4th century CE. Around the end of the Heian period, Baba Sukemoto, a warlord of the Heike clan, moved to Mito and built a castle there. Mito Castle changed hands several times after that; coming under the control of the Satake clan won it in Sengoku period, but the Satake were forced to surrender it to Tokugawa Ieyasu in 1603 after the Battle of Sekigahara. Ieyasu's son Tokugawa Yorifusa was then given Mito Castle, becoming head of one of the three "gosanke" branches of the clan qualified to provide a new shōgun should the main family line fail. During this period, Mito was the seat of the so-called Mito School, a congregation of nativist scholars of Confucian persuasion led by Aizawa Seishisai, who during the 18th and 19th centuries advocated Western learning as a means not only to further Japanese technological development and international strength, but as means to prove Japanese uniqueness and superiority among nations. The Kōdōkan was the largest of the han schools. The capital of Edo was directly connected to Mito by the Mito Kaidō. The Tokugawa ruled Mito until the Meiji Restoration.

The city of Mito was formed on April 1, 1889, with the establishment of the modern municipalities system. It was one of the first 31 cities to be established in Japan. With a population of 25,000, it was designated as the prefectural capital of Ibaraki Prefecture. By 1900, the Jōban Line connected Mito to Tokyo, and by 1910, telephones and electric lighting were available throughout the city. More than three-quarters of the city was burned to the ground during the Mito air raid of August 2, 1945, just before the end of World War II.

The borders of Mito expanded in 1955 through 1958 through the annexation of the neighboring villages:

- On 1 April 1955, the villages of Kamiono, Watari, Yoshida, Sakedo (excluding the section of Wakamiya), Kawawada and Yanagawa
- On 1 June 1957, the villages of Kunita and Iitomi (excluding the section of Kamikunii)
- On 1 April 1958, the village of Akatsuka

The village of Tsunezumi was annexed in 1992. In 2001, Mito was designated a special city with increased local autonomy. The neighboring town of Uchihara was annexed in 2005. The city suffered from severe damage in the 2011 Tōhoku earthquake and tsunami with 25,982 houses completely or partially destroyed; however, there were only two fatalities.

Mito was designated a core city, with further increases in local autonomy on April 4, 2020.

== Government ==
Mito has a mayor-council form of government with a directly elected mayor and a unicameral city council of 28 members. Mito contributes six members to the Ibaraki Prefectural Assembly. In terms of national politics, the city is divided between the Ibaraki 1st district and the Ibaraki 2nd district of the lower house of the Diet of Japan.

== Economy ==
Mito is primarily a regional commercial center and administrative city as most industry in Ibaraki is concentrated around the nearby cities of Tsukuba and Hitachi. Mito has a modest but thriving tourism industry, centered on the Kairaku-en gardens and local museums dedicated to the Tokugawa family.

== Education ==
- Ibaraki University
- Tokiwa Junior College
- Tokiwa University
- Mito has 32 public elementary schools and 15 public middle schools operated by the city government, and one public elementary school and one public middle school operated by the national government. The city also has one private elementary school and two private middle schools. Mito has seven public high school operated by the Ibaraki Prefectural Board of Education and seven private high schools, as well as one public and one private high school which offers only night and correspondence courses. The prefecture also operates six special education schools for the handicapped.
- Ibaraki Korean Primary, Middle and High School, a North Korean school, is in the city.

== Transportation ==
=== Railway ===
JR East - Mito Line / Jōban Line

- Uchihara - Akatsuka - Kairakuen - Mito

JR East – Suigun Line

- Mito

Kashima Rinkai Railway Ōarai Kashima Line

- Mito - Higashi-Mito - Tsunezumi

=== Highway ===
- Jōban Expressway – Mito Interchange
- Kita-Kantō Expressway – Mito Minami Interchange
- Higashi-Mito Road – Mito-Oarai Interchange
- National Route 6
- National Route 50
- National Route 51
- National Route 118
- National Route 123
- National Route 124
- National Route 245
- National Route 349
- National Route 400

== Media ==
- Ibaraki Shimbun
- Ibaraki Broadcast System

== Local attractions ==
- Mito is the site of the Japanese garden Kairaku-en which is counted as one of the Three Great Gardens of Japan. Constructed by Tokugawa Nariaki in 1842, the park is known nationwide for its ume trees. Many people come to the park in spring to view the blossoms, particularly during the Ume Festival. In summer, Mito also holds the Mito Koumon Festival.
- Art Tower Mito
- The Museum of Modern Art, Ibaraki
- Ibaraki Prefectural Museum of History
- Kōdōkan School
- Lake Senba
- Mito Castle
- Mito Municipal Botanical Park
- Tokiwa Jinja

== Professional sports ==
- Mito HollyHock, J. League
- Ibaraki Robots, B. League
- Malva FC, F. League

== Sister cities ==
- Anaheim, California, United States, since December 21, 1976
- Chongqing, China, friendship city since June 6, 2000
- Tsuruga, Japan, since October 10, 1964
- Tainan, Taiwan, friendship city since November 22, 2024

== Notable people ==
- Kinji Fukasaku, movie director
- Mayumi Gojo, singer
- Aritomo Gotō, IJN admiral
- Shin'ichirō Ikebe, musician
- Mika Katsumura, actress
- Takashi Koizumi, movie director
- Takeo Kurita, IJN admiral
- Musōyama Masashi, sumo wrestler (Ōzeki)
- Mitoizumi Masayuki, sumo wrestler (Sekiwake)
- Megumi Nakajima, voice actress, singer
- Yutaka Nakajima, actor
- Sugiura Shigemine, World War 2 fighter pilot, worshiped now as a god in Tainan, Taiwan
- Teru Shimada, actor
- Hidenori Shoji, video game music composer
- Yuko Suzuhana, musician
- Azusa Tadokoro, voice actress, singer
- Yokoyama Taikan, artist
- Stomu Takeishi, musician
- Hitachiyama Taniemon, sumo wrestler (Yokozuna)
- Tatsuro, musician and singer of Mucc
- Miyabiyama Tetsushi, sumo wrestler (Ōzeki)
- Nobuo Tobita, voice actor
- Nakamura Tsune, artist
- Ayase Ueda, footballer
- Hiroyuki Watanabe, actor
- Takashi Yagihashi, chef
- Huwie Ishizaki, singer-songwriter
- Saya Hiyama, freelance announcer and former weather forecaster

== Gallery ==
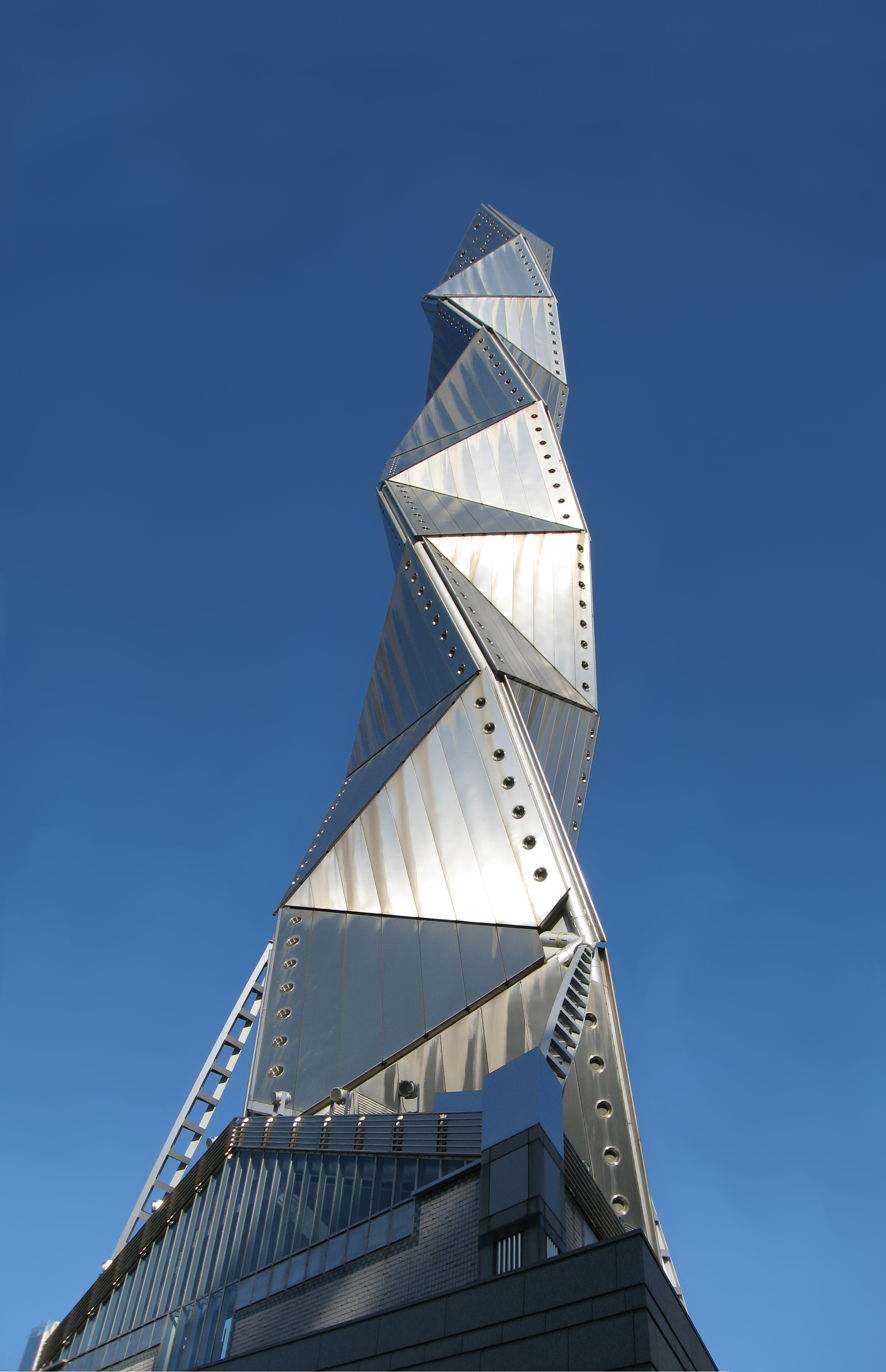
Art Tower Mito

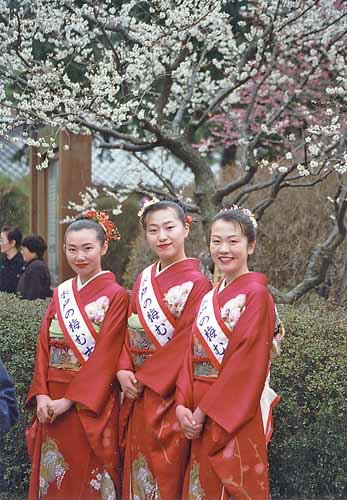
Ume Festival at Kairaku-en Park

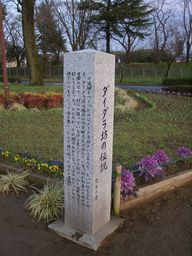
Legend of Daidarabotchi

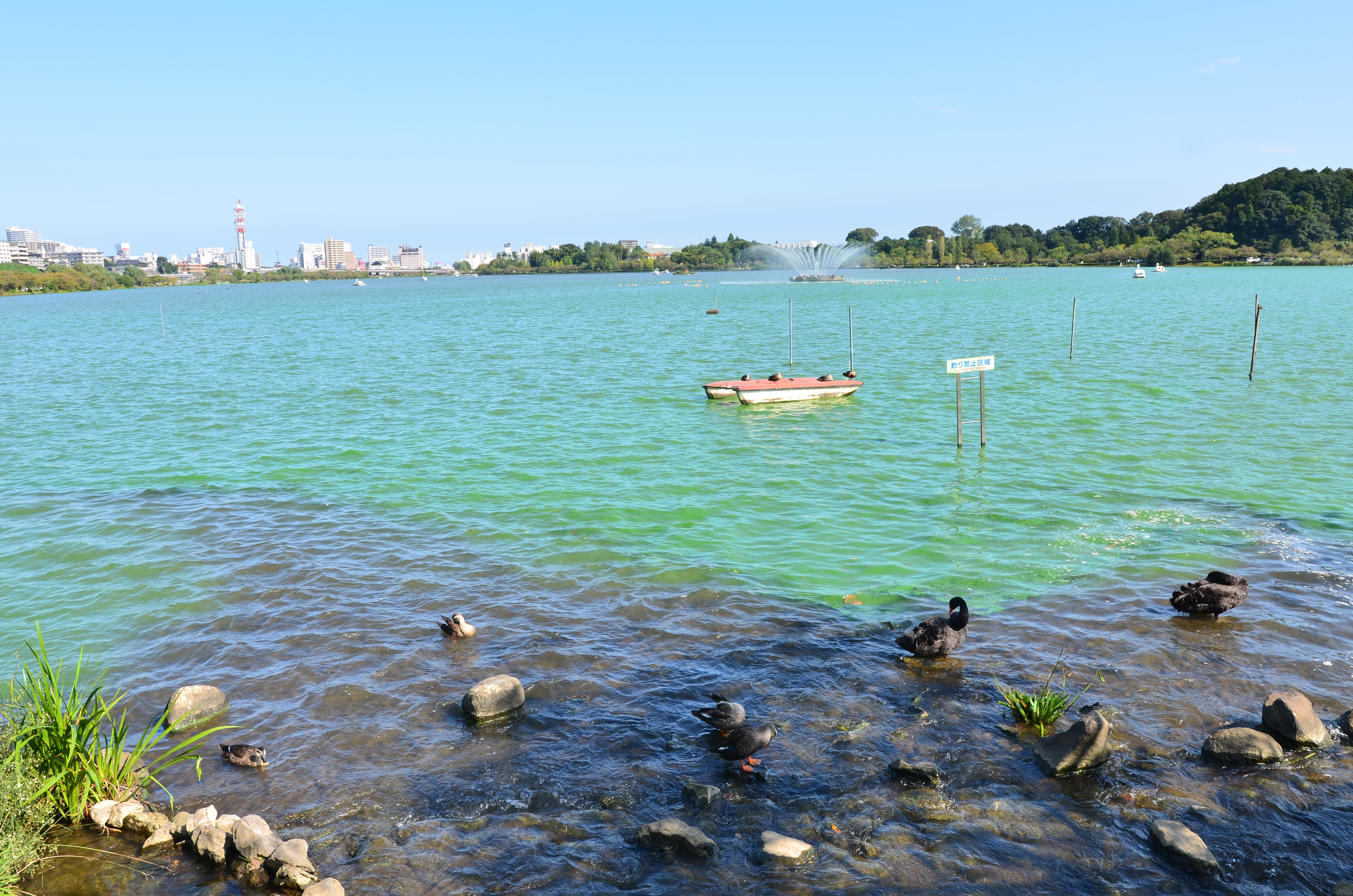
LakeSenba & Duck

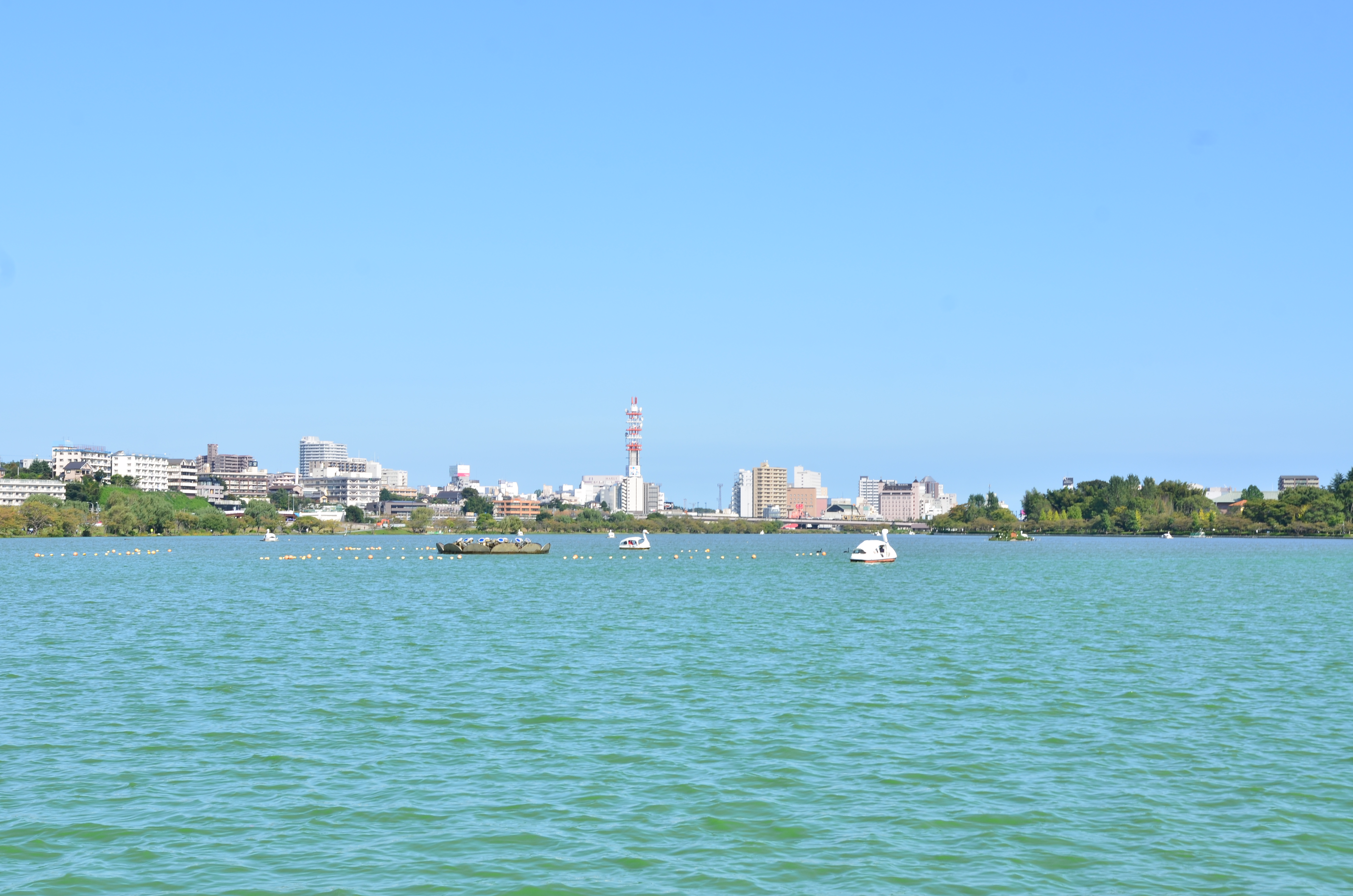
Lake Senba & Mito city

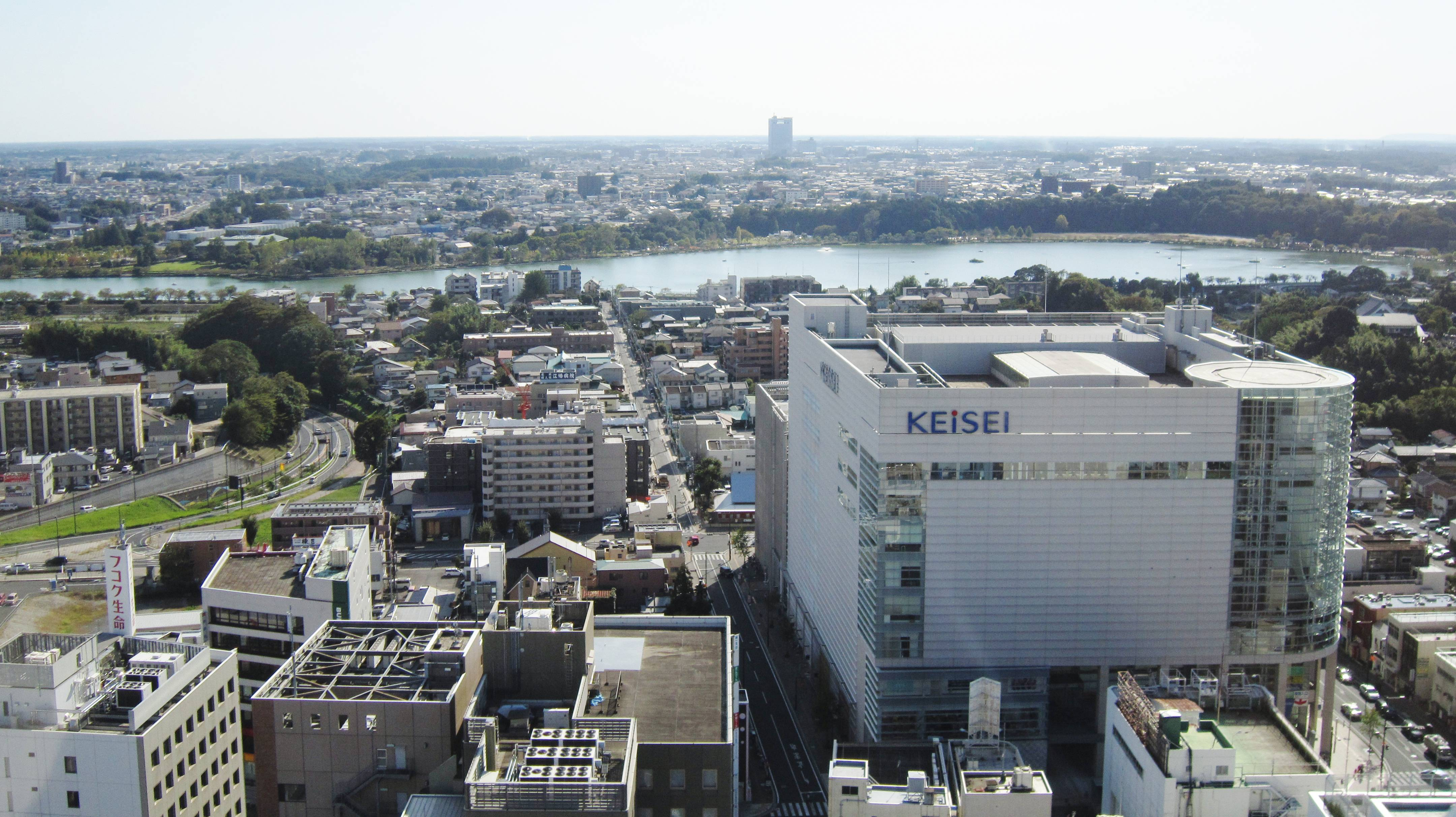
Downtown of Mito city
