= Suigō-Itako Bus Terminal =

Bus station in Itako, Ibaraki, Japan

Suigō-Itako Bus Terminal 水郷潮来バスターミナル
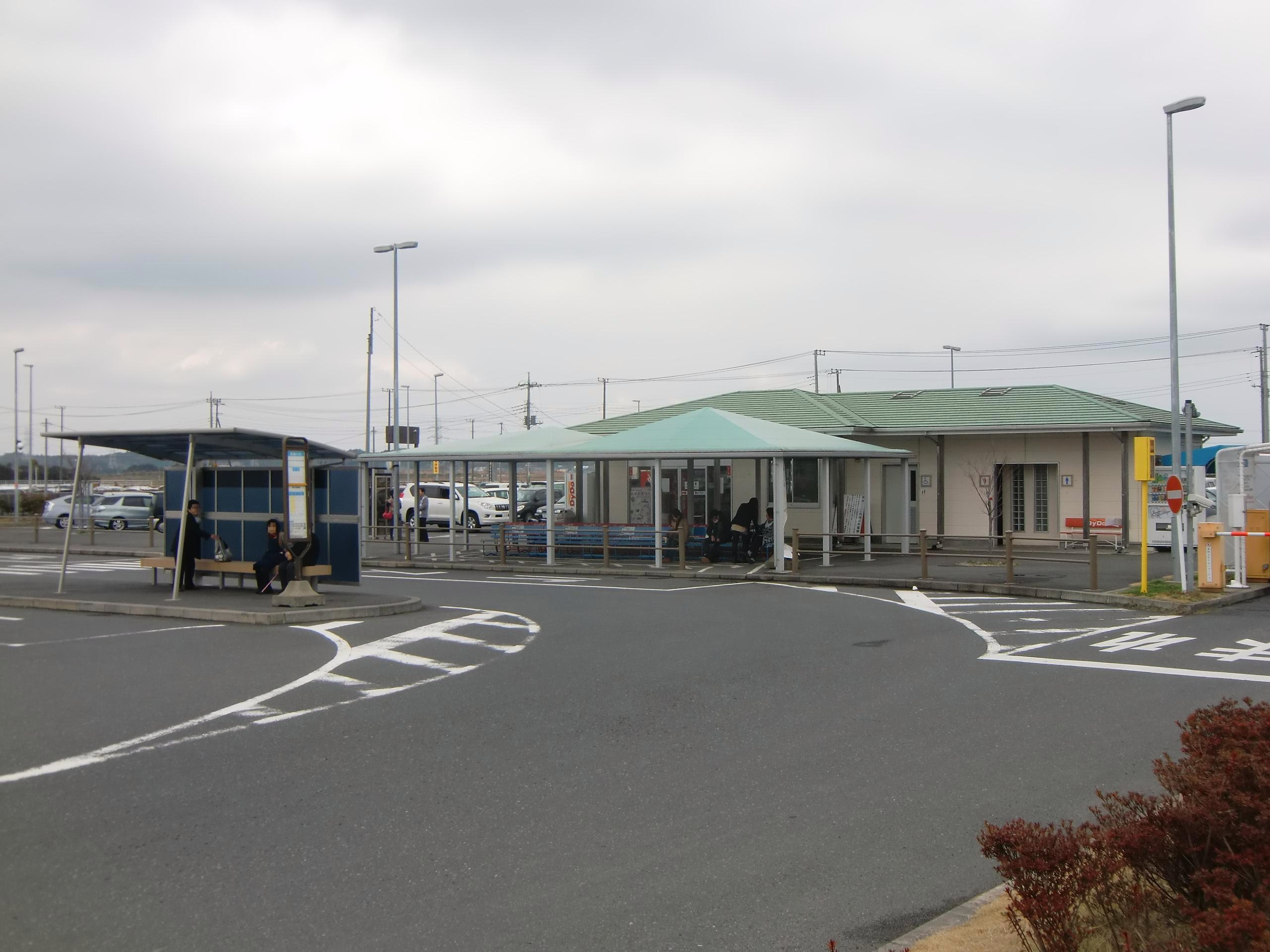

General information
- Location: 3707-2 Nobukata, Itako, Ibaraki Prefecture; Japan
- Coordinates: 35.938363°N 140.585320°E,

Other information
- Website: Official website

History
- Opened: 2002
Location
- Location within Ibaraki Prefecture Location within Japan

The Suigō-Itako Bus Terminal (水郷潮来バスターミナル, Suigō-Itako Basu Tāminaru) is a bus terminal situated in Itako, Ibaraki, Japan. It is used by the Kantō Railway, Keisei Bus and JR Bus Kantō, among others.

== Overview ==
The bus terminal is located near the Itako interchange on the Higashi-Kantō Expressway. The terminal was moved to the present spot in 2002 because the users had increased in number. There is an adjacent parking area.

There are 5 highway buses (For the direct of Tokyo Station, Narita Airport, Haneda Airport, Kaihinmakuhari Station, Tokyo Disney Resort and Odaiba) and two route bus (bound to Kashima and Namegata).

The Suigo-Itako Ayame Festival is held annually in Itako from late May to late June. The Suigo-Itako Ayame Garden, where the festival is held, is located near the terminal.

== Buses ==
=== Highway buses ===
An IC card (Pasmo and Suica) can be used on highway buses except Roze Liner.

Name	Via	Terminal	Company
Kashima		Tokyo Station	JR Bus Kantō, Kantō Railway
Hasaki		Tokyo Station	Kantō Railway, JR Bus Kantō
KashimaーHaneda Airport Line		Haneda Airport	Kantō Railway, Keihin Kyuko Bus
KashimaーOdaiba Line	Kaihin-Makuhari Station・Tokyo Disney Resort	Tokyo Teleport Station	Kantō Railway
Roze Liner		Narita Airport	Ibaraki Kotsu, Chiba Kōtsū

=== Route buses ===
An IC card (Pasmo and Suica) can be used on route buses except Ikeda Kōtsū.

Name	Via	Terminus	Company
Kōiki Renkei Route Bus Rokko Kitaura Line	Itako Shiyakusho Iriguchi・Itako Station・Nobukata Station・Namegata Farmers Village・Asō Chōsha	Asō Onsen Shiraho no Yu	Kantetsu Green Bus
Kōiki Renkei Route Bus Rokko Kitaura Line		Michi no Eki Itako	Kantetsu Green Bus
Rokko Kōiki Bus Jingū・Ayame・Shiraho Line	Michi no Eki Itako・Nobukata Station・Kashimajingū Station・Oyama Kinen Byoin	Aeon Cheerio	Kantō Railway, Ikeda Kōtsū
Rokko Kōiki Bus Jingū・Ayame・Shiraho Line	Itako Station・Itako Shiritsu Toshokan・Asō Tomita	Asō Chōsha	Kantō Railway, Ikeda Kōtsū

== Nearby stations and ports ==
Nobukata Station and Itako Station, both on the Kashima Line, are a respective 35 and 40 minutes on foot from the bus terminal. 50 minute's walk will bring from the terminal to Itako Port. Passengers are able to travel from this port to Tsuchiura Station via ferry.

== See also ==
- Suigō-Tsukuba Quasi-National Park
