= Nobukata Station =

Railway station in Itako, Ibaraki Prefecture, Japan

Nobukata Station 延方駅
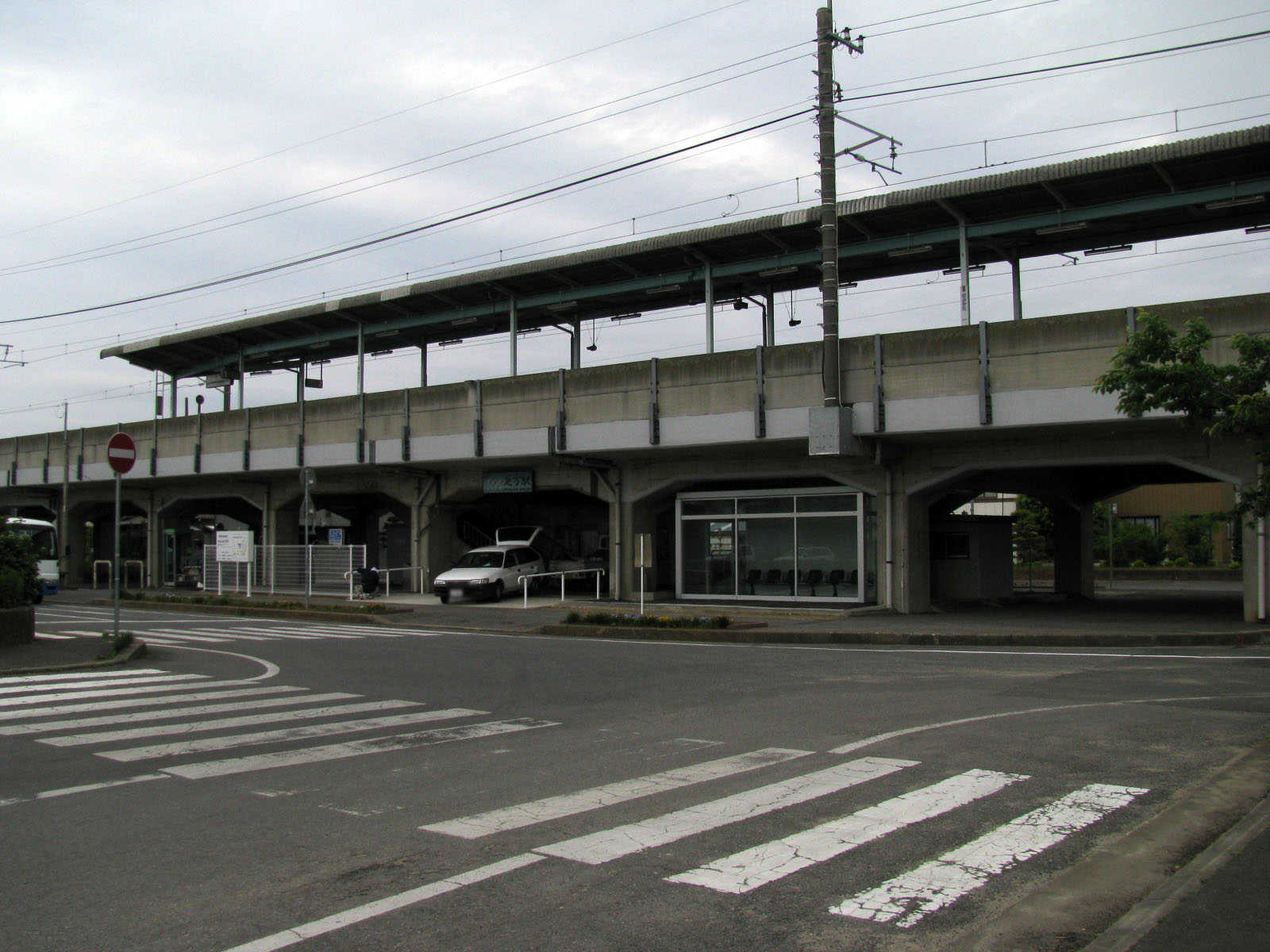
- Nobukata Station, May 2008

General information
- Location: Miyamae 1-chome 15, Itako-shi, Ibaraki-ken 311-2412; Japan
- Coordinates: 35.9580°N 140.5886°E
- Operator: JR East
- Line: ■ Kashima Line
- Distance: 10.4 km from Katori
- Platforms: 1 island platform

Other information
- Status: Unstaffed
- Website: Official website

History
- Opened: 20 August 1970

Services
Preceding station	JR East	Following station
Itako towards Sawara	Kashima Line	Kashimajingū towards Kashima Soccer Stadium
Location
- Location within Ibaraki Prefecture Location within Japan

Nobukata Station (延方駅, Nobukata-eki) is a passenger railway station located in the city of Itako, Ibaraki Prefecture, Japan operated by the East Japan Railway Company (JR East).

== Lines ==
Nobukata Station is served by the Kashima Line, and is located 10.4 km from the official starting point of the line at Katori Station.

== Station layout ==
The station consists of one elevated island platform with the station building underneath. The station is unattended.

=== Platforms ===
1	■ Kashima Line	for Kashimajingū
2	■ Kashima Line	for Sawara and Narita and Tokyo

== History ==
Nobukata Station was opened on 20 August 1970. The station was absorbed into the JR East network upon the privatization of the Japanese National Railways (JNR) on 1 April 1987.

== Surrounding area ==
- Nobukata Post Office

== See also ==
- List of railway stations in Japan
