= Jūnikyō Station =

Railway station in Katori, Chiba Prefecture, Japan

Jūnikyō Station 十二橋駅
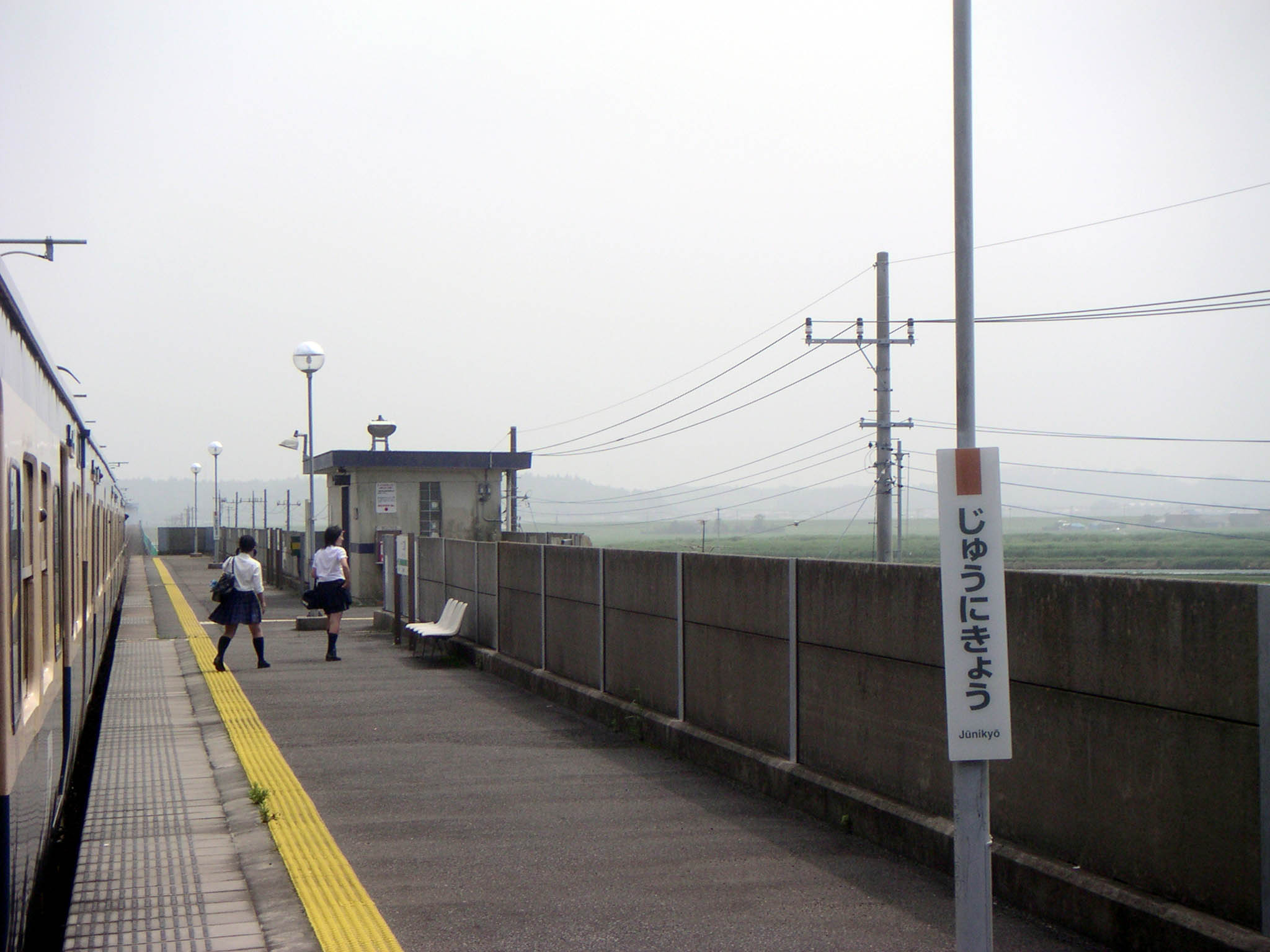
- Junikyo Station platform, July 2005

General information
- Location: Tsu-no-miya 3928-14, Katori-shi, Chiba-ken 287-0803; Japan
- Coordinates: 35.9167°N 140.5457°E
- Operator: JR East
- Line: ■ Kashima Line
- Distance: 3.0 km from Katori
- Platforms: 1 side platform

Other information
- Status: Unstaffed
- Website: Official website

History
- Opened: 20 August 1970

Passengers
- FY2006: 55 (daily)

Services
| Preceding station | JR East | Following station |
|---|---|---|
| Katori towards Sawara | Kashima Line | Itako towards Kashima Soccer Stadium |
Location
- Location within Ibaraki Prefecture Location within Japan

Jūnikyō Station (十二橋駅, Jūnikyō-eki) is a passenger railway station located in the city of Katori, Chiba Prefecture, Japan operated by the East Japan Railway Company (JR East).

== Lines ==
Jūnikyō Station is served by the Kashima Line, and is located 3.0 km from the official starting point of the line at Katori Station.

== Station layout ==
The station consists of one elevated side platform with a weather shelter, but no station building. The platform is short and can accommodate trains of up to six carriages. The station is unattended.

== History ==
Jūnikyō Station was opened on August 20, 1970, as a passenger station on the Japan National Railways (JNR). The station was absorbed into the JR East network upon the privatization of the Japan National Railways (JNR) on April 1, 1987.

== Surrounding area ==
- Suigō Sawara Aquatic Botanical Garden

== See also ==
- List of railway stations in Japan
