= Shimōsa-Kōzaki Station =

Railway station in Kōzaki, Chiba Prefecture, Japan

Shimōsa-Kōzaki Station 下総神崎駅
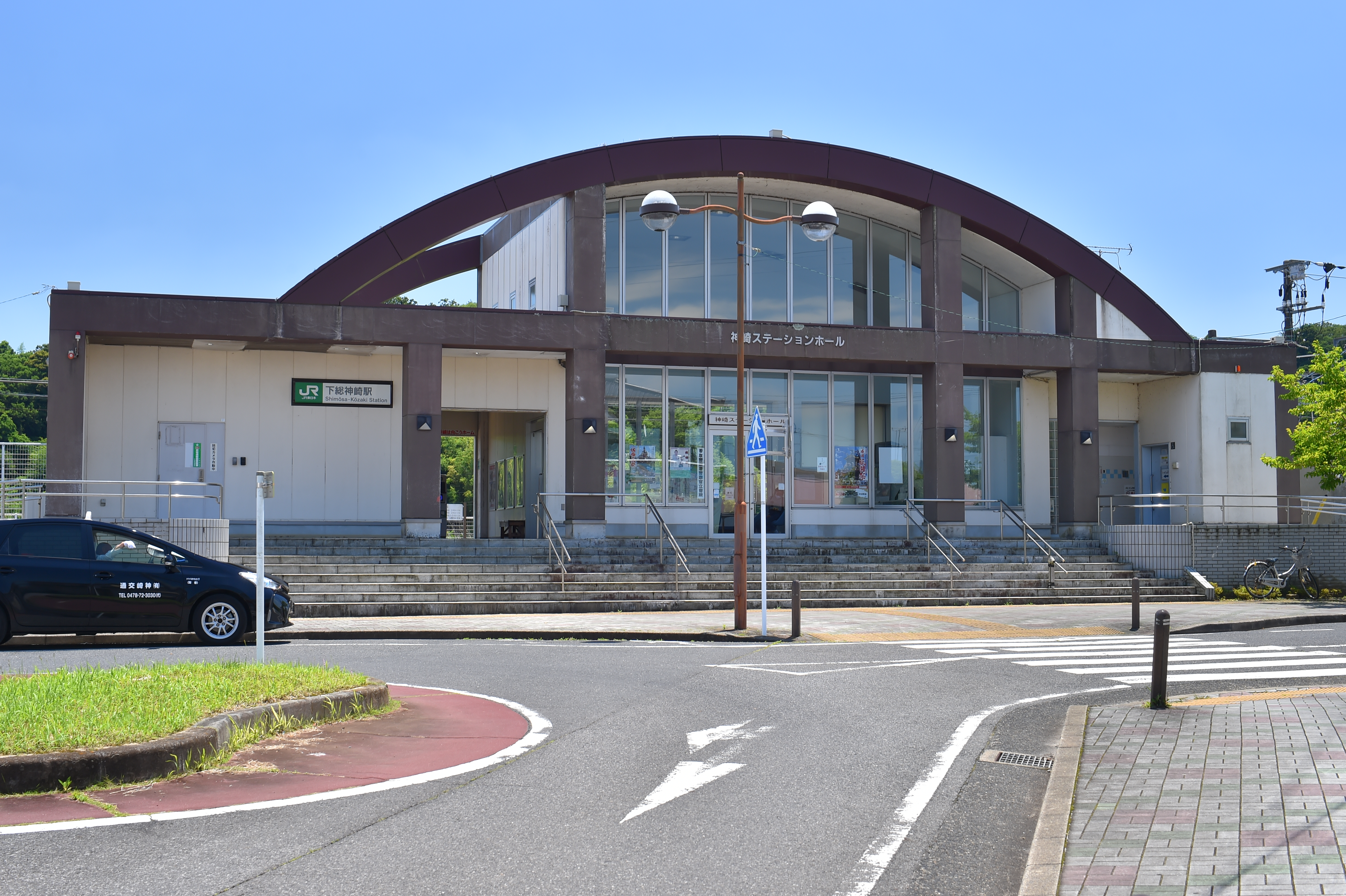
- Shimōsa-Kōzaki Station, June 2023

General information
- Location: Kōri 1234, Kōzaki-machi, Katori-gun, Chiba-ken 289-0202; Japan
- Coordinates: 35.8946°N 140.4105°E
- Operator: JR East
- Line: ■ Narita Line
- Distance: 31.6 km from Sakura
- Platforms: 2 side platforms

Other information
- Status: Staffed
- Website: Official website

History
- Opened: February 3, 1898
- Former names: Kōri (until 1957)

Passengers
- FY2019: 793

Services
Preceding station	JR East	Following station
Namegawa towards Chiba	Narita Line	Ōto towards Chōshi
Location
- Location within Chiba Prefecture Location within Japan

Shimōsa-Kōzaki Station (下総神崎駅, Shimōsa-Kōzaki-eki) is a passenger railway station in the town of Kōzaki, Chiba, Japan, operated by the East Japan Railway Company (JR East).

== Lines ==
Shimōsa-Kōzaki Station is served by the Narita Line, and is located 31.6 kilometers from the terminus of line at Sakura Station.

== Station layout ==
Shimōsa-Kōzaki Station consists of dual opposed side platforms connected by a footbridge. The station building is adjacent to Platform 1. The station is staffed.

=== Platforms ===
1	■ Narita Line	For Narita, Sakura, Chiba
2	■ Narita Line	For Sawara , Chōshi, Kashima-Jingu

== History ==
Shimōsa-Kōzaki Station was opened on February 3, 1898, as Kōri Station (郡駅, Kōri-eki) on the Narita Railway for both passenger and freight operations. The Narita Railway was nationalised on September 1, 1920, becoming part of the Japanese Government Railway (JGR). The station was renamed to its present name on April 1, 1957. After World War II, the JGR became the Japan National Railways (JNR). Scheduled freight operations were suspended from April 1, 1971. The station was absorbed into the JR East network upon the privatization of the Japan National Railways (JNR) on April 1, 1987. The station building was rebuilt in 1998.

== Passenger statistics ==
In fiscal 2019, the station was used by an average of 793 passengers daily (boarding passengers only).

== Surrounding area ==
- Ōsugi Shrine, also known as "Ambasama" (安婆嶋 – あんばさま)
- Kozaki Town Hall
- Kozaki Municipal Kanzaki Junior High School

== See also ==
- List of railway stations in Japan
