= Namegawa Station =

Railway station in Narita, Chiba Prefecture, Japan

Namegawa Station 滑河駅
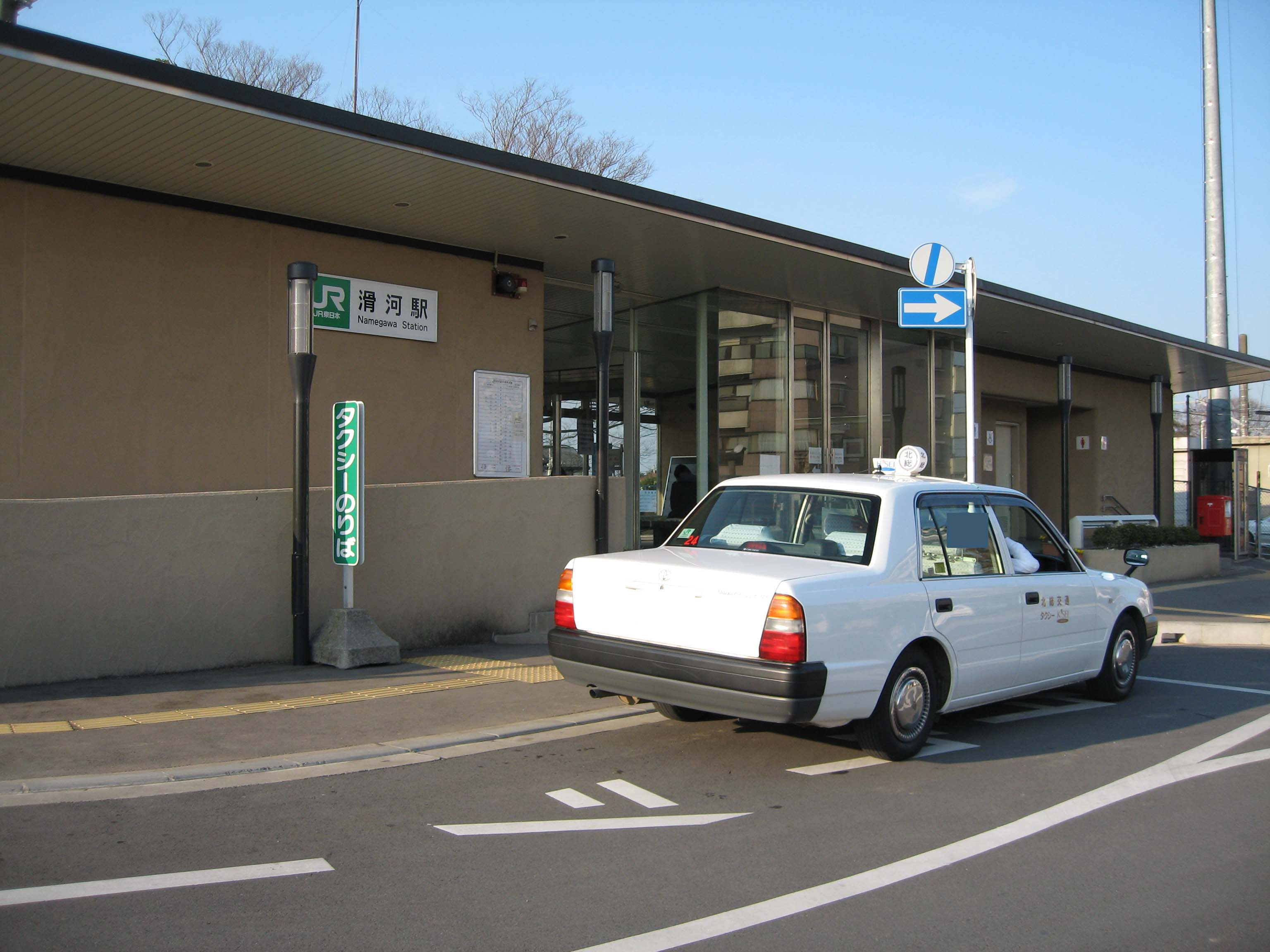
- Namegawa Station in January 2007

General information
- Location: Saruyama265, Narita-shi, Chiba-ken 289-0107; Japan
- Coordinates: 35.8773°N 140.3481°E
- Operator: JR East
- Line: ■ Narita Line
- Distance: 25.5 km from Sakura
- Platforms: 2 side platforms

Other information
- Status: Staffed
- Website: Official website

History
- Opened: December 29, 1897

Passengers
- FY2019: 809

Services
Preceding station	JR East	Following station
Kuzumi towards Chiba	Narita Line	Shimōsa-Kōzaki towards Chōshi
Location
- Location within Chiba Prefecture Location within Japan

Namegawa Station (滑河駅, Namegawa-eki) is a passenger railway station in the city of Narita, Chiba, Japan, operated by the East Japan Railway Company (JR East).

== Lines ==
Namegawa Station is served by the Narita Line, and is located 25.5 kilometers from the terminus of line at Sakura Station.

== Station layout ==
The station consists of dual opposed side platforms connected to the station building by a footbridge; however, platform 1 is used only during peak hours. The station is staffed.

=== Platforms ===
1	■ Narita Line	For Sawara , Chōshi, Kashima-Jingu
2	■ Narita Line	For Narita, Sakura, Chiba
2	■ Narita Line	For Sawara , Chōshi, Kashima-Jingu

== History ==
Namegawa Station was opened on December 29, 1897 as a terminal station on the Narita Railway for both passenger and freight operations. The line was extended to Sawara on February 3, 1898. A new station building was completed in 1920, just before the Narita Railway was nationalised on September 1, 1920, becoming part of the Japanese Government Railway (JGR). After World War II, the JGR became the Japan National Railways (JNR). Scheduled freight operations were suspended from April 1, 1971. The station was absorbed into the JR East network upon the privatization of the Japan National Railways (JNR) on April 1, 1987. The station building was rebuilt in 2005.

== Passenger statistics ==
In fiscal 2019, the station was used by an average of 238 passengers daily (boarding passengers only).

== Surrounding area ==
- Tone River
- former Shimofusa town hall
- Shimofusa Post Office

== See also ==
- List of railway stations in Japan
