= Ōto Station =

Railway station in Katori, Chiba Prefecture, Japan

Ōto Station 大戸駅
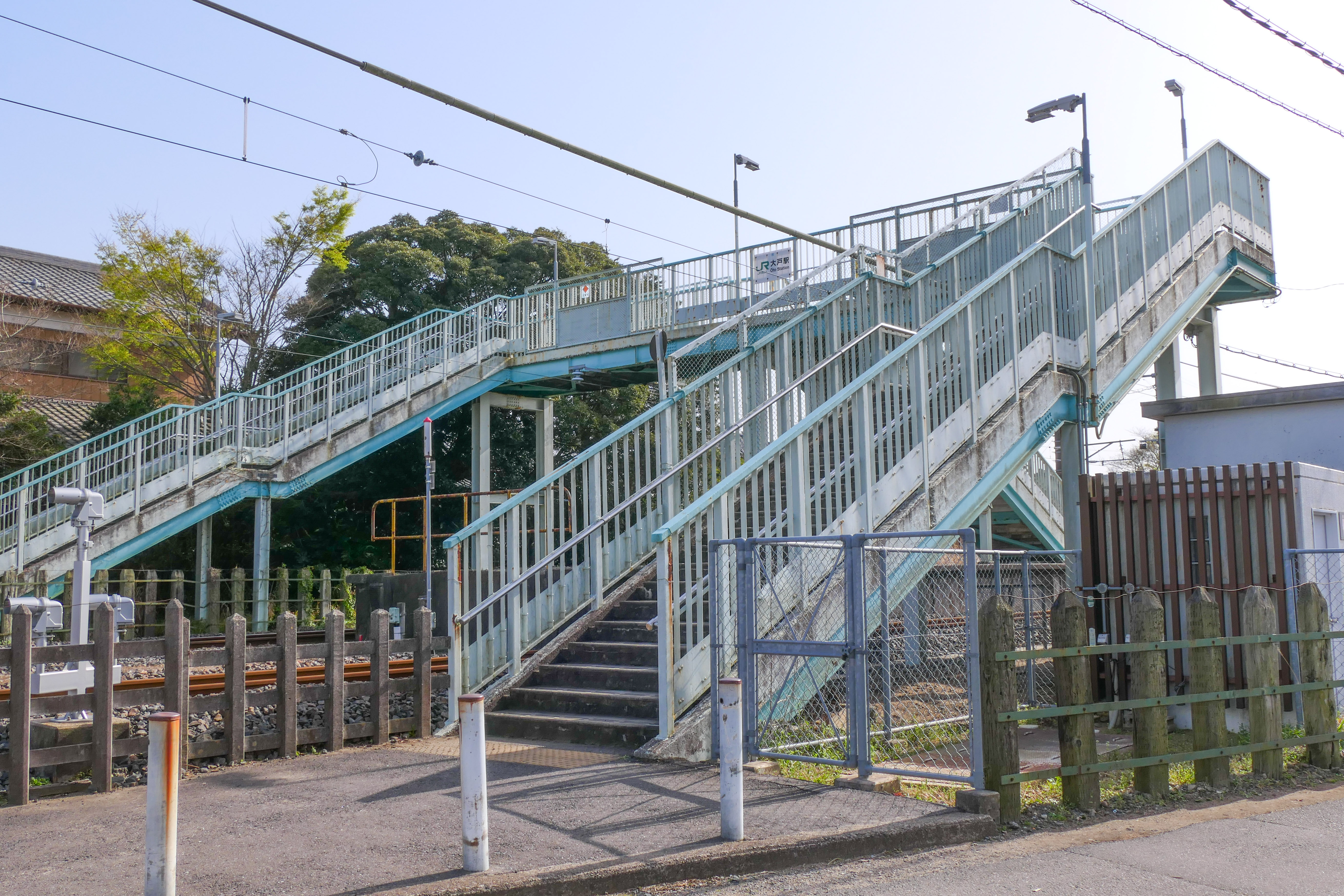
- Ōto Station entrance, March 2021

General information
- Location: Ōtogawa 11, Katori-shi, Chiba-ken 287-0054; Japan
- Coordinates: 35.8901°N 140.4579°E
- Operator: JR East
- Line: ■ Narita Line
- Distance: 36.1 km from Sakura
- Platforms: 1 island platform

Other information
- Status: Unstaffed
- Website: Official website

History
- Opened: April 1, 1926

Passengers
- 2006: 243 daily

Services
| Preceding station | JR East | Following station |
|---|---|---|
| Shimōsa-Kōzaki towards Chiba | Narita Line | Sawara towards Chōshi |
Location
- Location within Chiba Prefecture Location within Japan

Ōto Station (大戸駅, Ōto-eki) a passenger railway station in the city of Katori, Chiba, Japan, operated by the East Japan Railway Company (JR East).

== Lines ==
Ōto Station is served by the Narita Line, and is located 36.1 kilometers from the terminus of line at Sakura.

== Layout ==
Ōto Station has a single ground-level island platform connected to the neighboring streets by a footbridge. There is no station building. Bathrooms are located to the north of the station.

=== Platforms ===
| 1 | ■ Narita Line | for Sawara, Chōshi, and Kashima-Jingu |
| 2 | ■ Narita Line | for Narita, Sakura, and Chiba |

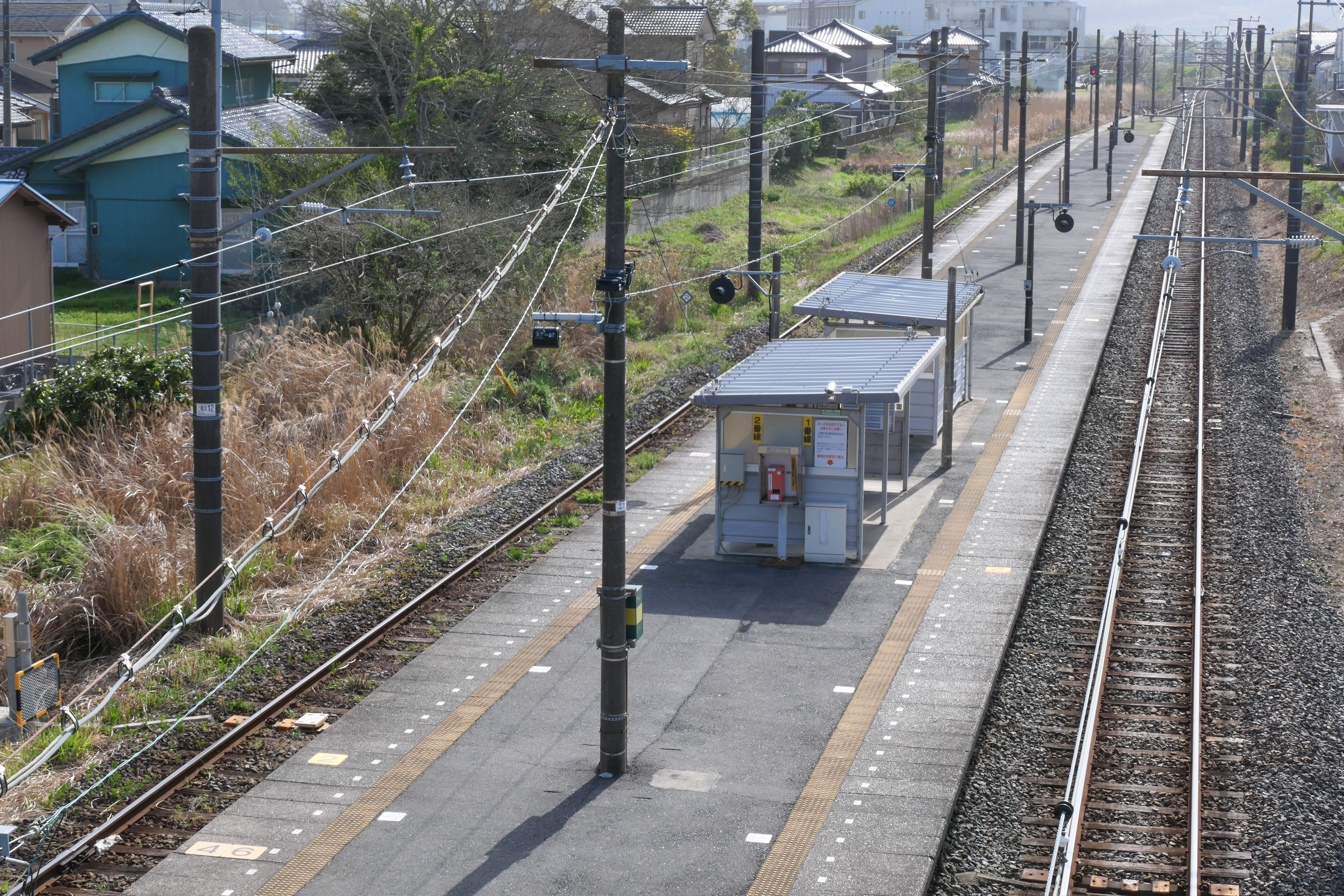
Ōto Station platforms, March 2021

== History ==
Ōto Station was opened on April 1, 1926, as a station on the Japanese Government Railway (JGR) for both passenger and freight operations. After World War II, the JGR became the Japan National Railways (JNR). Scheduled freight operations were suspended from October 1, 1962. The station has been unattended since July 1, 1970. The station was absorbed into the JR East network upon the privatization of the Japan National Railways (JNR) on April 1, 1987. The station building was rebuilt from 2007 to 2011.

== Passenger statistics ==
In fiscal 2006, the station was used by an average of 243 passengers daily.

== Surrounding area ==
- National Route 356
- Ōto Jinja

== See also ==
- List of railway stations in Japan
