= Itako Station =

Railway station in Itako, Ibaraki Prefecture, Japan

Itako Station 潮来駅
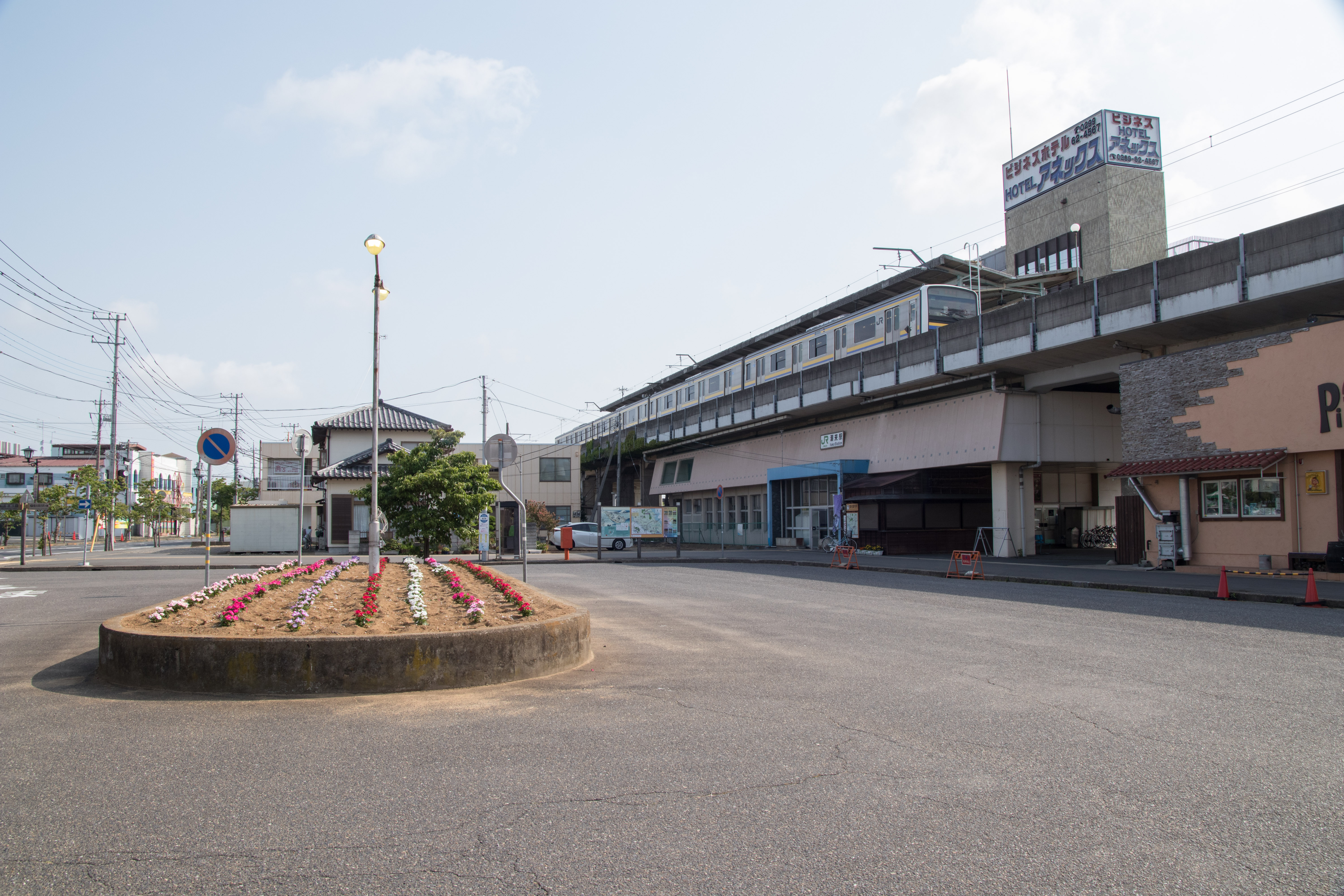
- Itako Station, May 2018

General information
- Location: Ayame 1-chome 1-1-16, Itako-shi, Ibaraki-ken 311-2425; Japan
- Coordinates: 35.9372°N 140.5494°E
- Operator: JR East
- Line: ■ Kashima Line
- Distance: 5.2 km from Katori
- Platforms: 1 island platform

Other information
- Status: Staffed
- Website: Official website

History
- Opened: 20 August 1970

Passengers
- FY2019: 320 (daily)

Services
Preceding station	JR East	Following station
Jūnikyō towards Sawara	Kashima Line	Nobukata towards Kashima Soccer Stadium
Location
- Location within Ibaraki Prefecture Location within Japan

Itako Station (潮来駅, Itako-eki) is a passenger railway station located in the city of Itako, Ibaraki Prefecture, Japan operated by the East Japan Railway Company (JR East).

== Lines ==
Itako Station is served by the Kashima Line, and is located 5.2 km from the official starting point of the line at Katori Station.

== Station layout ==
The station consists of one elevated island platform with the station building underneath. The station is staffed.

=== Platforms ===
1	■ Kashima Line	for Kashimajingū
2	■ Kashima Line	for Sawara and Narita and Tokyo

== History ==
Itako Station was opened on 20 August 1970. The station was absorbed into the JR East network upon the privatization of the Japanese National Railways (JNR) on 1 April 1987.

== Passenger statistics ==
In fiscal 2019, the station was used by an average of 320 passengers daily (boarding passengers only).

== Surrounding area ==
- Itako Post Office

== See also ==
- List of railway stations in Japan
