= E217 series =

Japanese train type

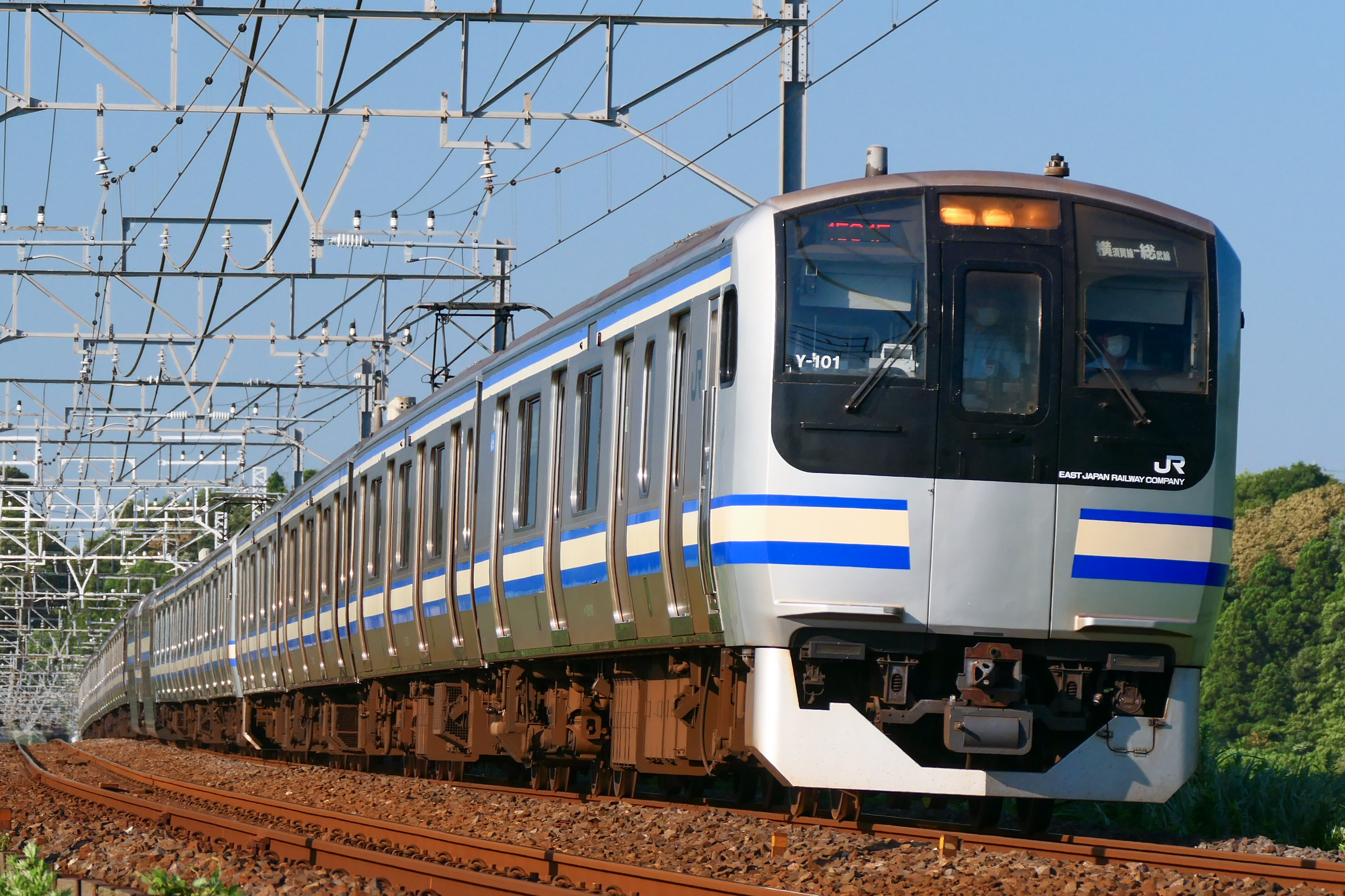
- E217 series set Y-101 in June 2022
- In service: 1994 – 8 March 2025
- Manufacturers: Tokyu Car, Kawasaki Heavy Industries, JR East (Niitsu/Ofuna)
- Replaced: 113 series
- Constructed: 1994–1999
- Entered service: 3 December 1994
- Refurbished: 2008–2012
- Scrapped: 2021–2025
- Number built: 745 vehicles (97 sets)
- Number in service: None
- Successor: E235-1000 series
- Formation: 4/11 cars per trainset
- Fleet numbers: Y-01 – Y-51, Y-101 – Y-146
- Operator: JR East
- Depot: Kamakura
- Lines served: Yokosuka Line; Sōbu Line (Rapid); Narita Line; Sōbu Main Line; ■ Kashima Line; ■ Uchibō Line; ■ Sotobō Line; Tokaido Main Line; Shōnan-Shinjuku Line

Specifications
- Car body construction: Stainless steel
- Car length: 19,500 mm (64 ft 0 in) (20,000 mm (65 ft 7 in) when couplers included)
- Width: 2,950 mm (9 ft 8 in)
- Doors: 4 per side
- Maximum speed: 120 km/h (75 mph)
- Traction system: Variable frequency (GTO/IGBT)
- Power output: 1,520 kW
- Acceleration: 2.0 km/(h⋅s) (1.2 mph/s)
- Deceleration: 4.2 km/(h⋅s) (2.6 mph/s)
- Electric system: 1,500 V DC overhead catenary
- Braking system: Regenerative brake
- Safety systems: ATS-P, ATS-SN, ATC (not service)
- Coupling system: Shibata type
- Track gauge: 1,067 mm (3 ft 6 in)

The E217 series (E217系) was a suburban electric multiple unit (EMU) train type operated by East Japan Railway Company (JR East) in the Kantō region of Japan from 1994 to 2025.

== Design ==
Introduced in 1994 to replace the 113 series EMUs running on the Sōbu Line (Rapid) and Yokosuka Line, the E217 series was the first outer-suburban train type in Japan to feature four pairs of doors per side per car. The basic design was developed from the 209 series commuter EMUs. It replaced all the Yokosuka Line 113 series trains by 1999. The trains were built jointly by Kawasaki Heavy Industries, Tokyu Car, and JR East (Niitsu and Ofuna factories).

For traction, they used Mitsubishi Electric-manufactured VVVF inverters with IGBT (formerly GTO) switching devices which control Mitsubishi MT68/73 traction motors. The gear ratio was 97:16.

== Former operations ==
- Kashima Line (Sawara – Kashima-Jingū)
- Narita Line (Chiba – Narita Airport, Sawara)
- Sōbu Main Line (Tokyo – Narutō)
- Sotobō Line (Chiba – Kazusa-Ichinomiya)
- Uchibō Line (Chiba – Kimitsu)
- Yokosuka Line (Tokyo – Kurihama)
- Shōnan–Shinjuku Line (Shinjuku – Zushi) (December 2001 – October 2004)
- Tōkaidō Main Line (Tokyo – Atami) (March 2006 – March 2015)
- Airport Narita (name discontinued March 2018)

== Formations ==
=== Yokosuka/Sōbu Line formations ===
==== 11-car Yokosuka/Sōbu Line sets ====
The 11-car sets were based at Kamakura Depot and formed with four motored ("M") cars and seven non-powered trailer ("T") cars.

	← Kimitsu, Narita Airport Kurihama →										
Car No.	11	10	9	8	7	6	5	4	3	2	1
Designation	Tc	T	M	M'	T		Tsd	Tsd'	M	M'	Tc'
Numbering	KuHa E217	SaHa E217	MoHa E217	MoHa E216-1000	SaHa E217-2000		SaRo E217	SaRo E216	MoHa E217-2000	MoHa E216-2000	KuHa E216-2000

- Cars 3 and 9 each had one scissors pantograph.
- Cars 1 and 11 had an accessible/priority "free space".
- Cars 1, 5, and 11 each had a toilet (universal design in car 1, Japanese-style in car 11).
- Car 8 was designated as a mildly air-conditioned car.
- Cars 4 and 5 were bilevel Green Cars with transverse seating.
- Cars 9, 10, and 11 had a mix of longitudinal and transverse box seating.

==== 4-car Yokosuka/Sōbu Line sets ====
The four-car sets were based at Kamakura Depot and formed with two motored ("M") cars and two non-powered trailer ("T") cars.

	← Kimitsu, Narita Airport Kurihama →			
Car No.	+4	+3	+2	+1
Designation	Tc	M	M'	Tc'
Numbering	KuHa E217-2000	MoHa E217-2000	MoHa E216-2000	KuHa E216-1000/2000

- Car +3 had a scissors pantograph.
- Cars +1 and +4 had an accessible/priority "free space".
- Car +1 had a Japanese-style toilet.

=== Tōkaidō Line formations ===
==== 10-car Tōkaidō Line sets ====
Three 10-car sets (F-01–F-03) were based at Kōzu Depot and formed with four motored ("M") cars and six non-powered trailer ("T") cars.

	← Tokyo Atami →									
Car No.	10	9	8	7	6	5	4	3	2	1
Designation	Tc	M	M'	T		Tsd	Tsd'	M	M'	Tc'
Numbering	KuHa E217	MoHa E217	MoHa E216-1000	SaHa E217-2000		SaRo E217	SaRo E216	MoHa E217-2000	MoHa E216-2000	KuHa E216-2000

- Cars 3 and 9 each had one scissors pantograph.
- Cars 1 and 10 had an accessible/priority "free space".
- Cars 1, 5, and 10 each had a toilet (universal design in car 1, Japanese-style in car 10).
- Car 8 was designated as a mildly air-conditioned car.
- Cars 4 and 5 were bilevel Green Cars with transverse seating.
- Cars 9 and 10 had a mix of longitudinal and transverse box seating.

==== 5-car Tōkaidō Line sets ====
Three five-car sets (F-51–F-53) were based at Kōzu Depot and formed with two motored ("M") cars and three non-powered trailer ("T") cars.

	← Tokyo Atami →				
Car No.	15	14	13	12	11
Designation	Tc	T	M	M'	Tc'
Numbering	KuHa E217-2000	SaHa E217	MoHa E217-2000	MoHa E216-2000	KuHa E216-1000

- Car 13 had a scissors pantograph.
- Cars 11 and 15 had an accessible/priority "free space".
- Car 11 had a Japanese-style toilet.
- Car 14 had a mix of longitudinal and transverse box seating.
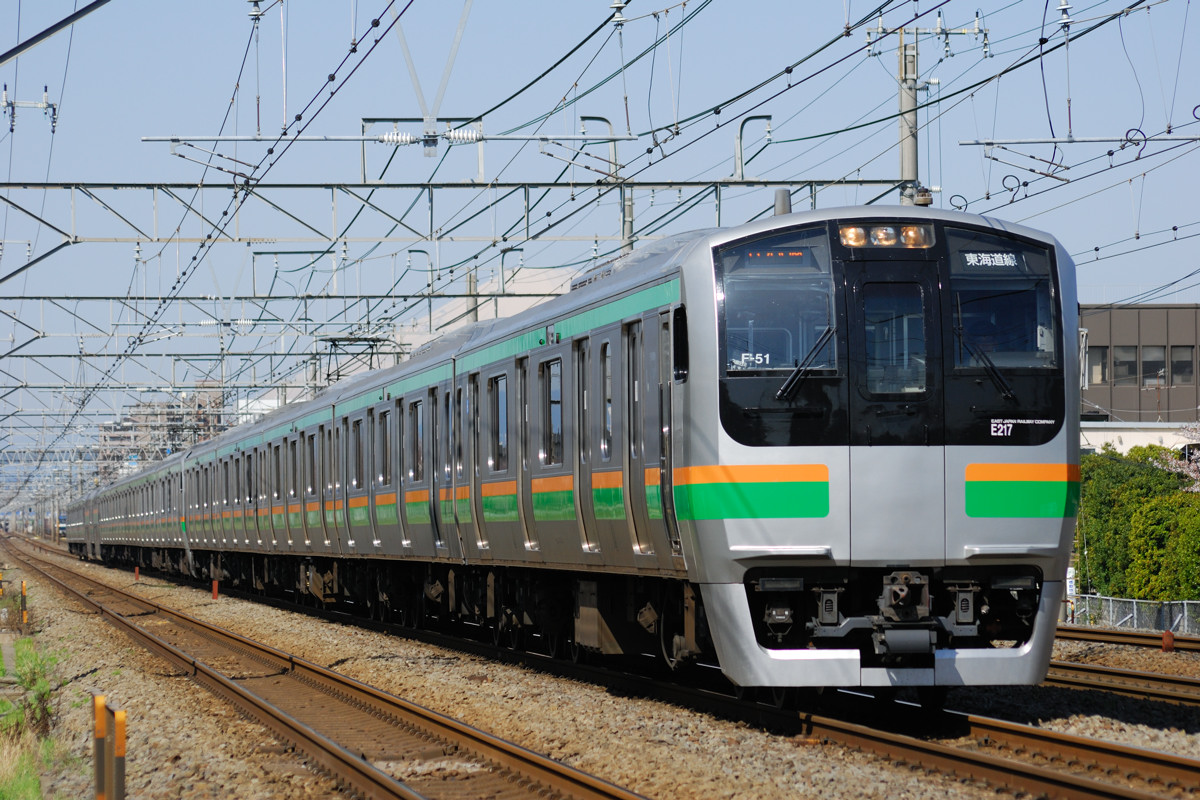
E217 series in Shōnan livery, April 2007

== Interior ==
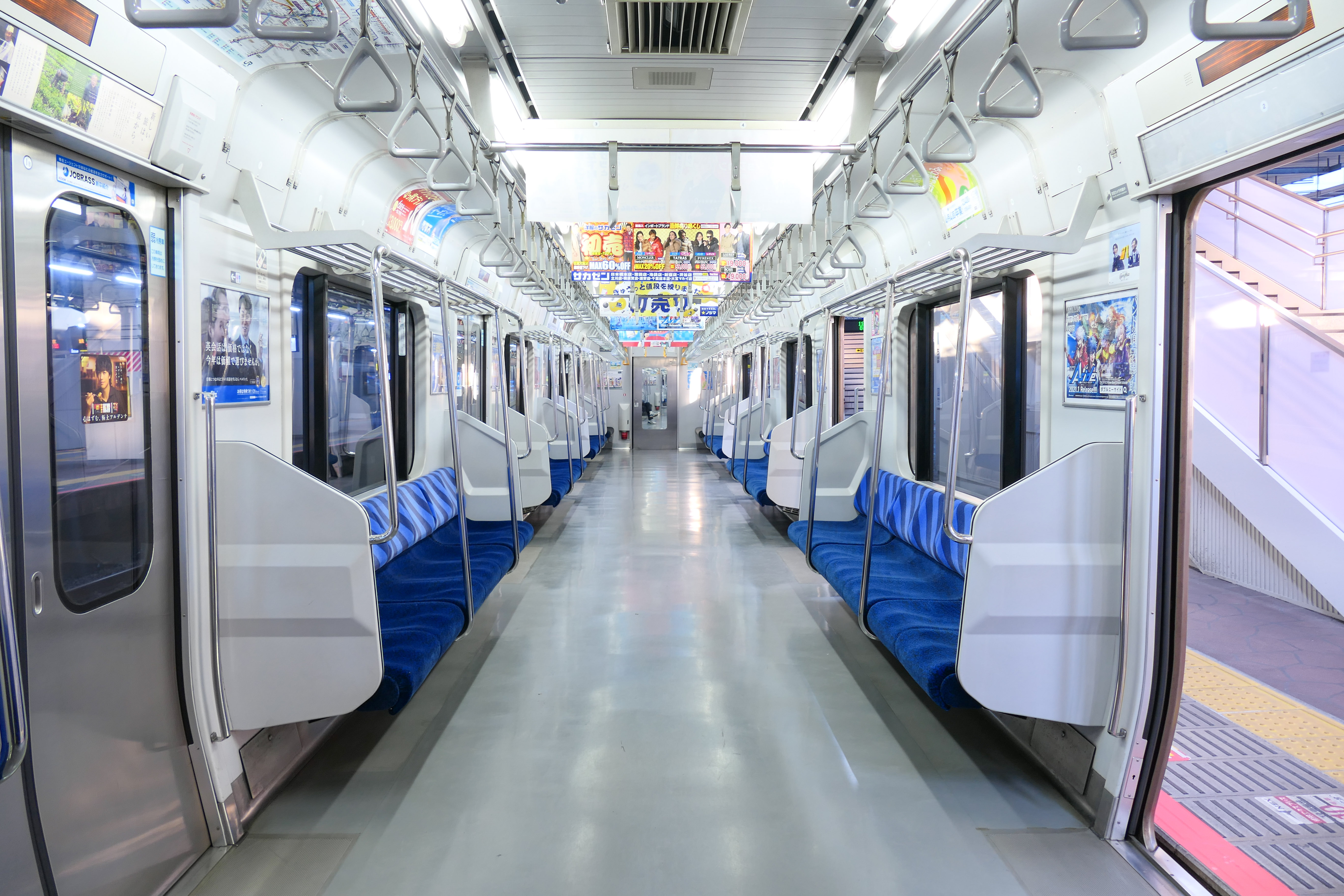
E217 series longitudinal seating

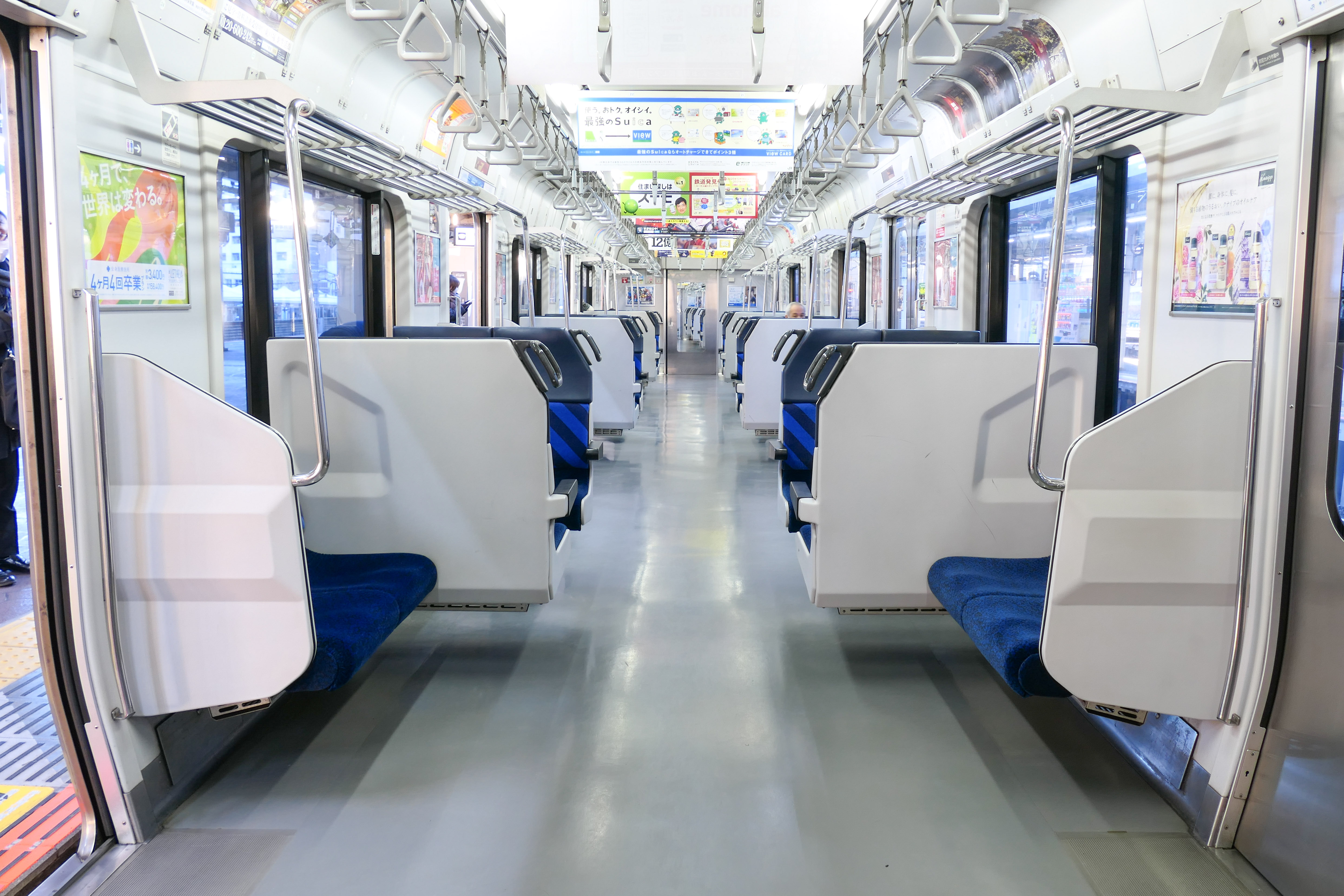
E217 series transverse seating

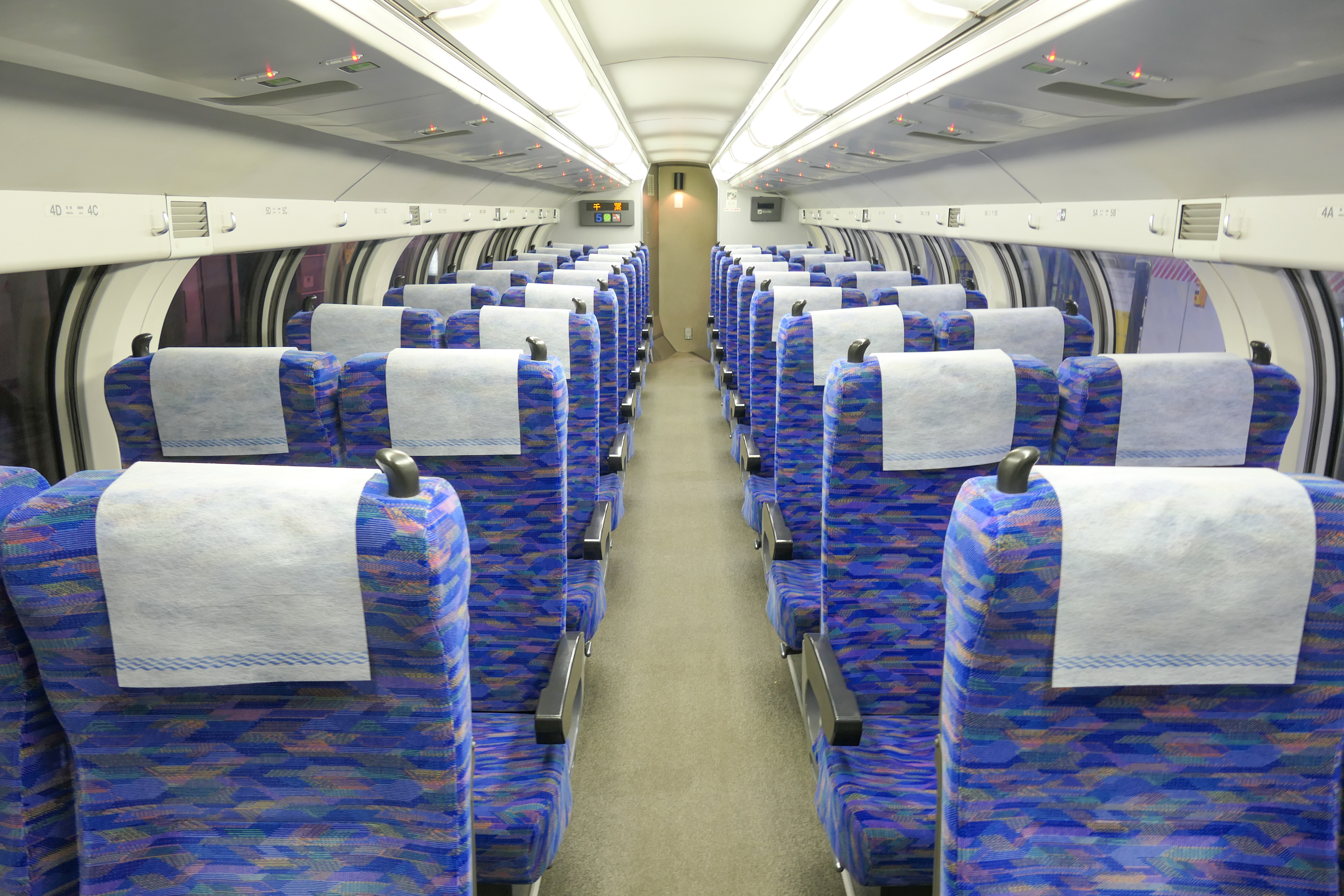
Green car upper saloon, October 2021

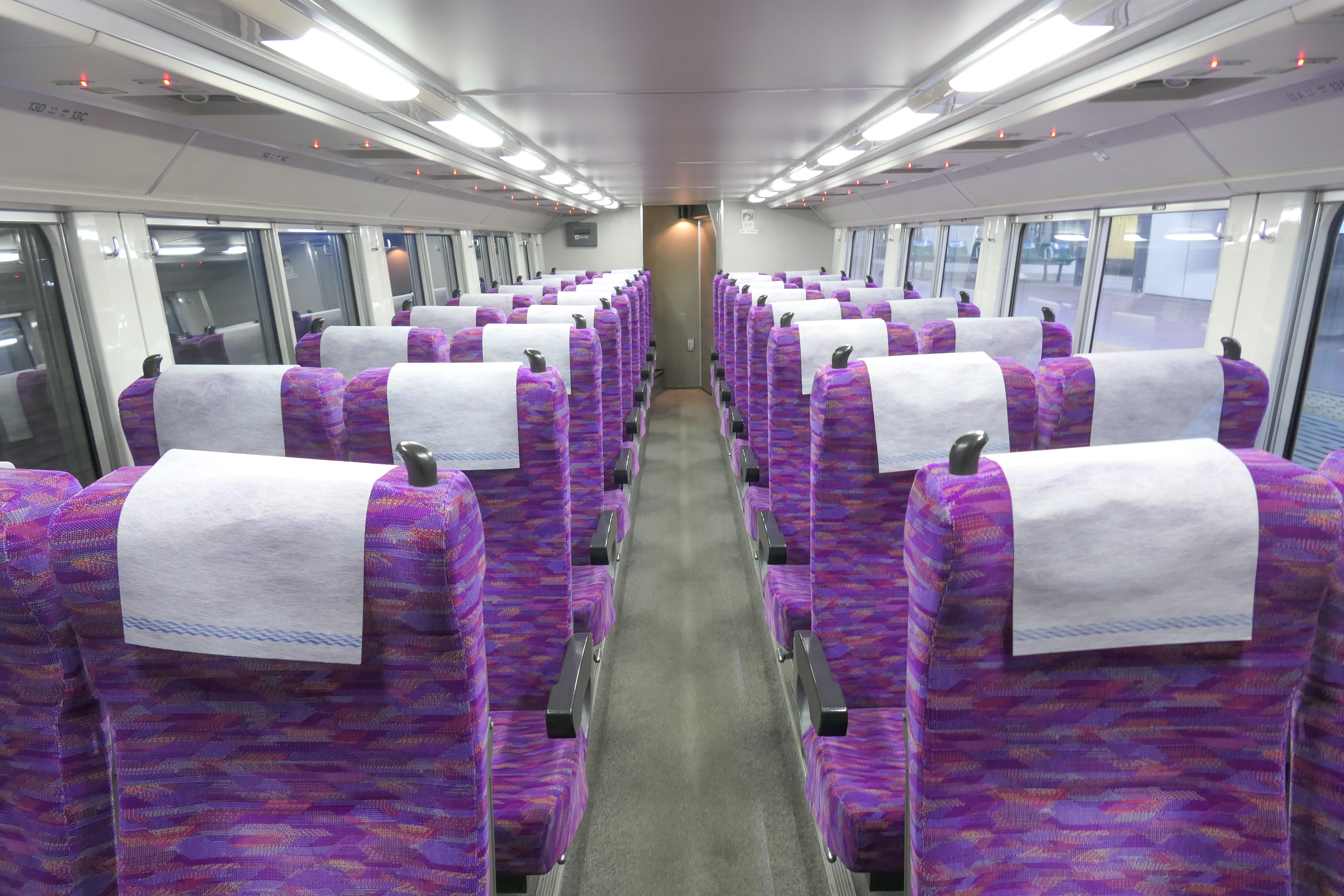
Green car lower saloon, October 2021

== History ==
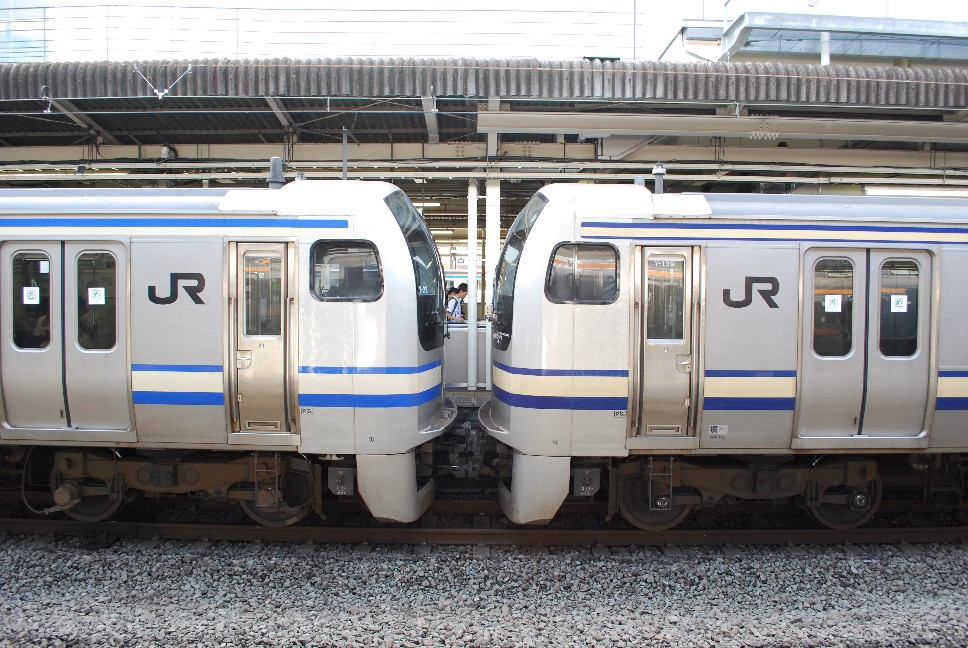
Refurbished (left) and unrefurbished (right) sets, August 2008

The E217 series trains entered revenue service from 3 December 1994.

From December 2001, 11-car trains were used on the Shōnan–Shinjuku Line between Shinjuku and Zushi. This continued until October 2004 when Shōnan–Shinjuku Line services were unified using E231-1000 series trains.

In March 2006, three 15-car trains were reformed as 10+5-car sets and transferred to Kōzu depot for use from 14 March 2006 on Tōkaidō Main Line duties out of Tokyo alongside E231-1000 series trains. The sets were repainted into the same Shonan color scheme of orange and green bodyside stripes as applied to the E231s. These sets were all transferred back to Yokosuka/Sōbu Line services by March 2015.

A program of refurbishment on the fleet commenced in 2008 and was completed in 2012. Externally, sets received lighter blue and cream stripes.

Following the introduction of newer E235-1000 series sets, withdrawals commenced in fiscal 2020. The first withdrawn set was transferred to Nagano in January 2021.

The last remaining sets were withdrawn from service after their final runs on 8 March 2025 before the start of the revised timetable on 15 March of that year.

=== Rejected export to Indonesia ===
In September 2022, Indonesian state railway operator Kereta Api Indonesia (KAI) filed for permission to import 348 used E217 series cars between 2023 and 2024 to replace older trainsets in its subsidiary commuter network KAI Commuter. This request was rejected by the Indonesian Ministry of Industry in January 2023, resulting in domestic controversy. Following meetings with government ministries, KAI later announced in June 2023 that they would buy new trainsets from Japan and Indonesia instead of used E217 series sets.
