= Suigō Station =

Railway station in Katori, Chiba Prefecture, Japan

Suigō Station 水郷駅
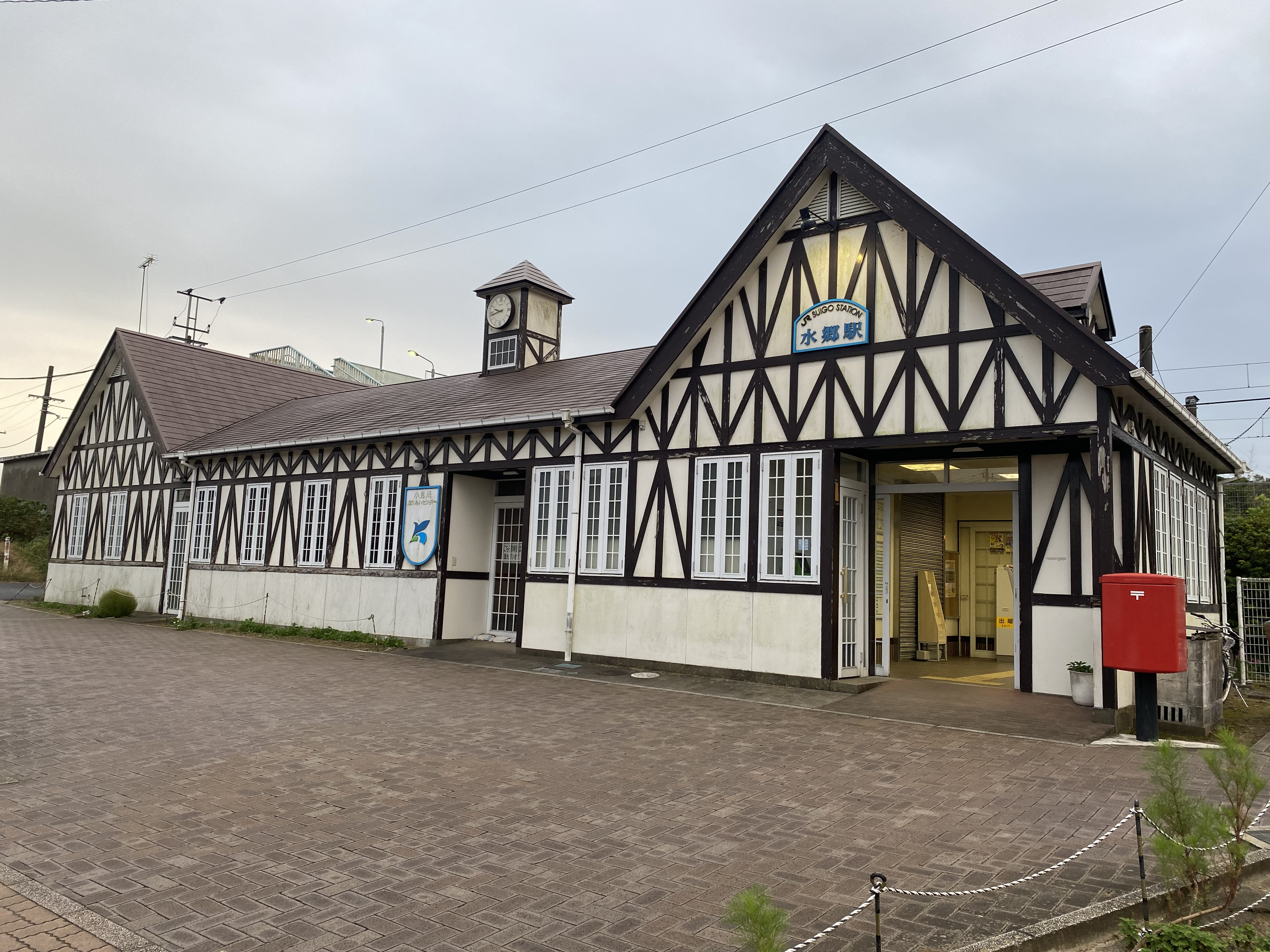
- Suigō Station building in September, 2021

General information
- Location: Ichi-no-wakame 1120, Katori-shi, Chiba-ken 289-0301; Japan
- Coordinates: 35.8856°N 140.5702°E
- Operator: JR East
- Line: ■ Narita Line
- Distance: 47.5 km from Sakura
- Platforms: 2 side platforms

Other information
- Status: Unstaffed
- Website: Official website

History
- Opened: November 10, 1931

Passengers
- FY2006: 185

Services
Preceding station	JR East	Following station
Katori towards Chiba	Narita Line	Omigawa towards Chōshi
Location
- Location within Chiba Prefecture Location within Japan

Suigō Station (水郷駅, Suigō-eki)a passenger railway station in the city of Katori, Chiba, Japan, operated by the East Japan Railway Company (JR East).

== Lines ==
Suigō Station is served by the Narita Line, and is located 47.5 kilometers from the terminus of line at Sakura Station.

== Layout ==
The station consists of dual opposed side platforms connected by a footbridge to a wooden, single-story station building. The station is unattended.

=== Platforms ===
1	■ Narita Line	For Chōshi
2	■ Narita Line	For Sawara, Narita, Sakura, Chiba

== History ==
Suigō Station was opened on November 10, 1931, as a station on the Japanese Government Railways (JGR) for both freight and passenger operations. After World War II, the JGR became the Japanese National Railways (JNR). Scheduled freight operations were suspended from October 1, 1962. The station has been unattended since July 1, 1970. The station was absorbed into the JR East network upon the privatization of the Japanese National Railways (JNR) on April 1, 1987. A new station building was completed in June 2009.

== Passenger statistics ==
In fiscal 2006, the station was used by an average of 185 passengers daily.

== Surrounding area ==
- Kanto Driving School
- National Route 356

== See also ==
- List of railway stations in Japan
