= E217 =

E217 may refer to:

- E217 series, a suburban electric train type
- Sodium propyl para-hydroxybenzoate
