= Itako, Ibaraki =

Itako 潮来市
- City
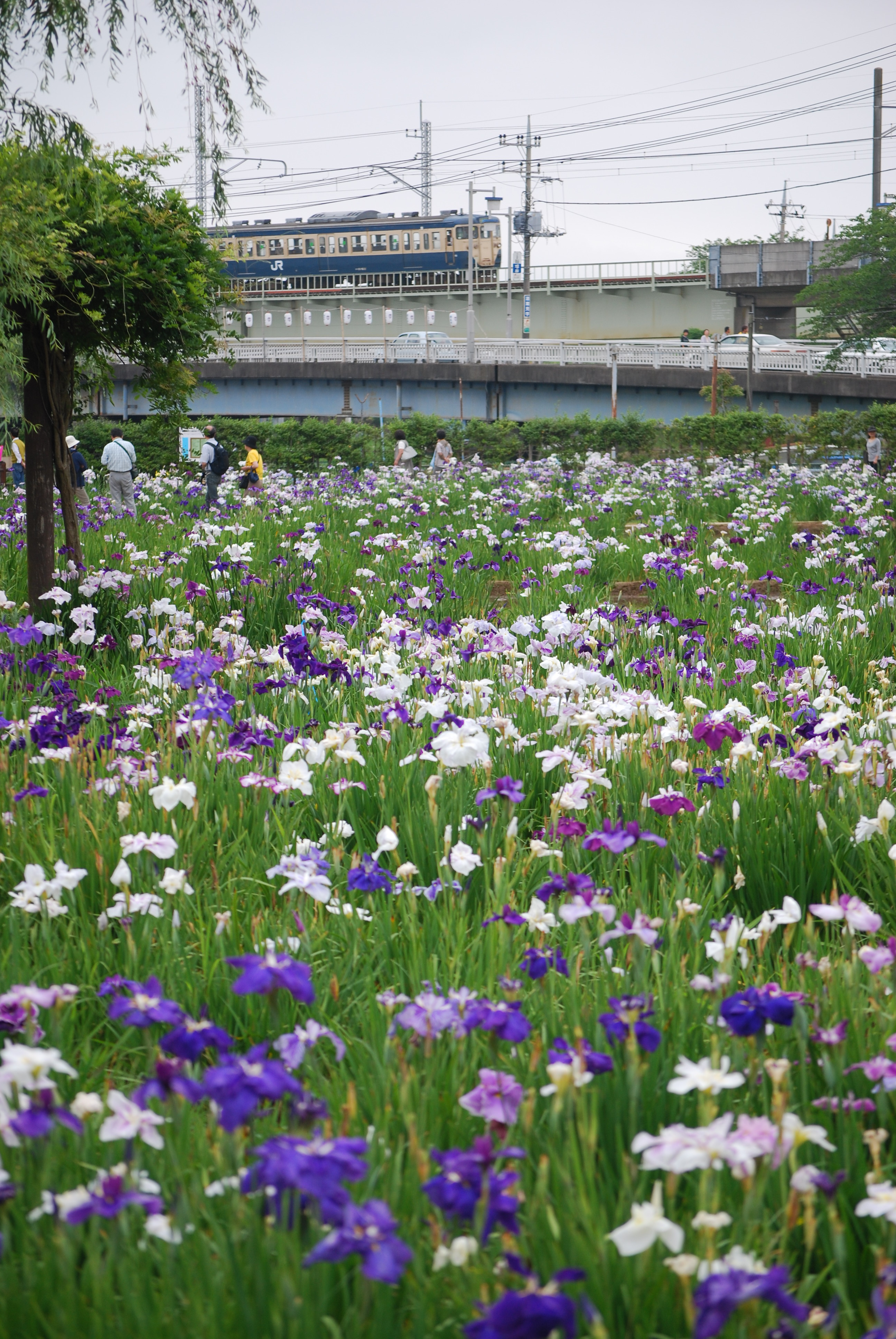
- Maekawa Iris Park

- Flag Seal

- Location of Itako in Ibaraki Prefecture

- Coordinates: 35°56′49.7″N 140°33′19.3″E
- Country: Japan
- Region: Kantō
- Prefecture: Ibaraki

Area
  - Total: 71.40 km^{2} (27.57 sq mi)

Population (October 2020)
  - Total: 27,512
  - Density: 385.3/km^{2} (998.0/sq mi)
- Time zone: UTC+9 (Japan Standard Time)
- Symbols
  - Tree: Populus
  - Flower: Iris
  - Bird: Great reed warbler
- Phone number: 0299-23-1111
- Address: 626 Tsuji, Itako-shi, Ibaraki-ken 311-2493
- Website: Official website

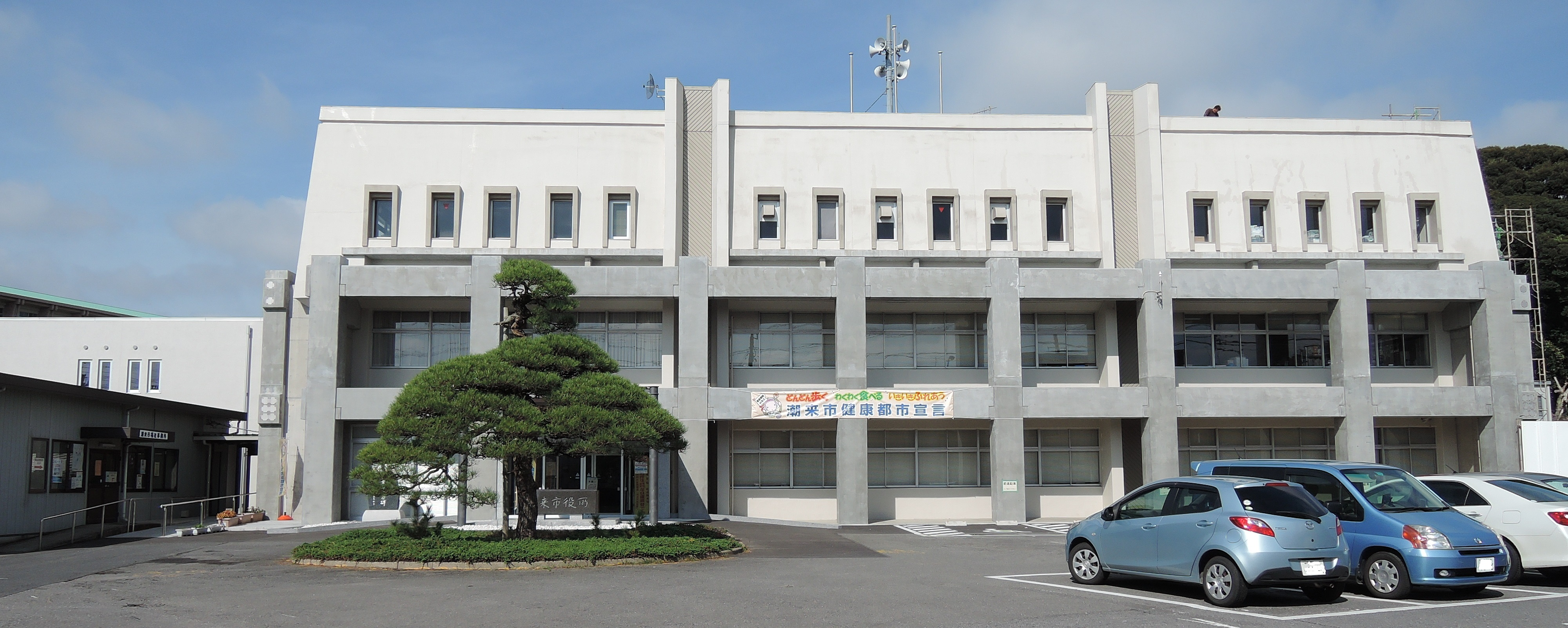
Itako city hall

Itako (潮来市, Itako-shi; Japanese pronunciation: [ì.tä́.kó̞(.ɕì)]) is a city located in Ibaraki Prefecture, Japan. As of 1 November 2024, the city had an estimated population of 26,063 in 10,849 households and a population density of 365 persons per km^{2}. The percentage of the population aged over 65 was 32.9%. The total area of the city is 71.40 square kilometres (27.57 sq mi). It is known for its annual iris festival (Itako Ayame Matsuri). Much of the city is within the borders of the Suigo-Tsukuba Quasi-National Park.

== Geography ==
Itako is located in southern Ibaraki Prefecture, bordered by Chiba Prefecture to the south, and sandwiched between Lake Kasumigaura to the west and Lake Kitaura to the east. The Tone River also flows through the city, which has been noted since the Edo period for its network of canals. The city is approximately 80 kilometres north of Tokyo.

=== Surrounding municipalities ===
Chiba Prefecture

- Katori

Ibaraki Prefecture

- Inashiki
- Kashima
- Kamisu
- Namegata

=== Climate ===
Itako has a humid subtropical climate (Köppen Cfa) characterized by warm summers and cool winters with light snowfall. The average annual temperature in Itako is 14.5 °C. The average annual rainfall is 1455 mm with September as the wettest month. The temperatures are highest on average in August, at around 25.9 °C, and lowest in January, at around 4.3 °C.

== Demographics ==
Per Japanese census data, the population of Itako peaked around the year 2000 and has declined slightly since.

Historical population
Year	Pop.	±%
1920	17,385	—
1930	18,453	+6.1%
1940	20,007	+8.4%
1950	25,516	+27.5%
1960	24,467	−4.1%
1970	25,005	+2.2%
1980	29,075	+16.3%
1990	30,863	+6.1%
2000	31,944	+3.5%
2010	30,534	−4.4%
2020	27,604	−9.6%

== History ==
The town of Itako was established within Namegata District with the creation of the modern municipalities system on April 1, 1889. Itako merged with the neighboring villages of Tsuwa, Nobukata and Ouhara on February 11, 1955. It was raised to city status on April 1, 2001, by absorbing the town of Ushibori.

== Government ==
Itako has a mayor-council form of government with a directly elected mayor and a unicameral city council of 16 members. Itako contributes one member to the Ibaraki Prefectural Assembly. In terms of national politics, the city is part of Ibaraki 2nd district of the lower house of the Diet of Japan.

== Economy ==
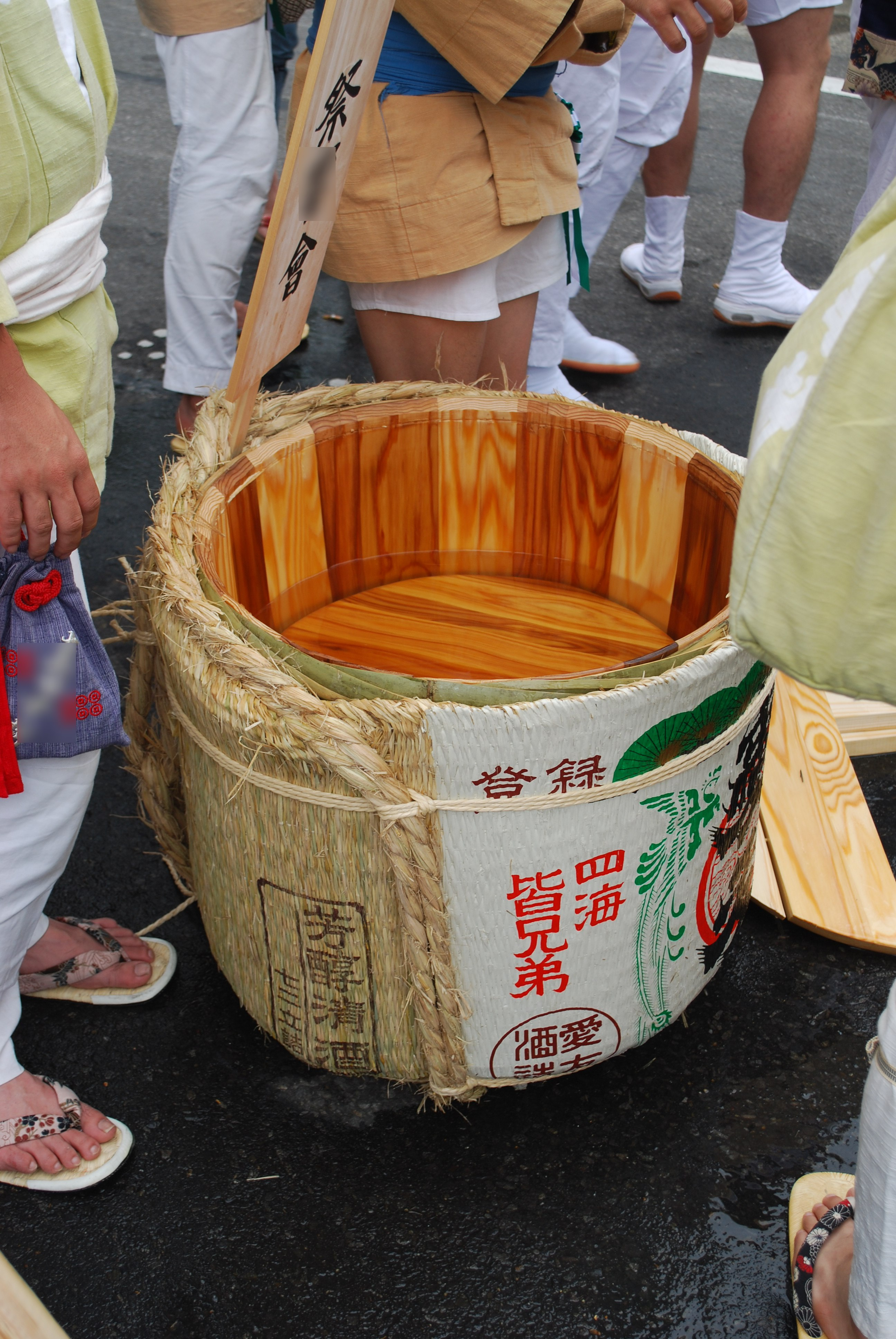
Sake barrel in Itako

- Aiyu Sake Brewery (愛友酒造) has been producing sake since 1804.

== Education ==
The education system in Itako, Ibaraki, is structured and comprehensive, reflecting Japan's commitment to quality education. Itako has six public elementary schools and four public junior high schools that provide compulsory education for children aged 6 to 15, ensuring free tuition and access to textbooks. For senior high school, there is one public institution where students must pass entrance exams for admission, with tuition fees applicable. The city also offers various options for part-time and correspondence courses to accommodate diverse student needs. Higher education opportunities are available at nearby institutions, such as Ibaraki University, which provides a range of academic programs. Additionally, financial support is accessible for low-income families at all educational levels, helping to ensure that all children have the opportunity to pursue their education without financial barriers. Overall, Itako's education system emphasizes accessibility, quality, and community support.

== Transportation ==
=== Railway ===
JR East – Kashima Line

- Itako – Nobukata

=== Bus ===
- Suigō-Itako Bus Terminal

=== Highway ===
- Higashi-Kantō Expressway – Itako IC
- National Route 51
- National Route 355

== Local attractions ==
- Chōshō-ji Buddhist temple
- Inariyama Park
- Junikyo Bridges
- Kongenyama park
- Nihonmatsu-dera Buddhist temple
- Road Station Itako
- Suigo Dragonfly Park
- Suigo Hokusai Park
- Suigo Itako Iris Gardens

== Notable people from Itako ==
- Tatsuya Kawahara, professional football player
- Kenji Koyano, professional football player
- Keita Sugimoto, professional football player
- Mitsuo Yanagimachi, movie director
