= Kashima Line =

Railway line in the prefectures of Chiba and Ibaraki, Japan

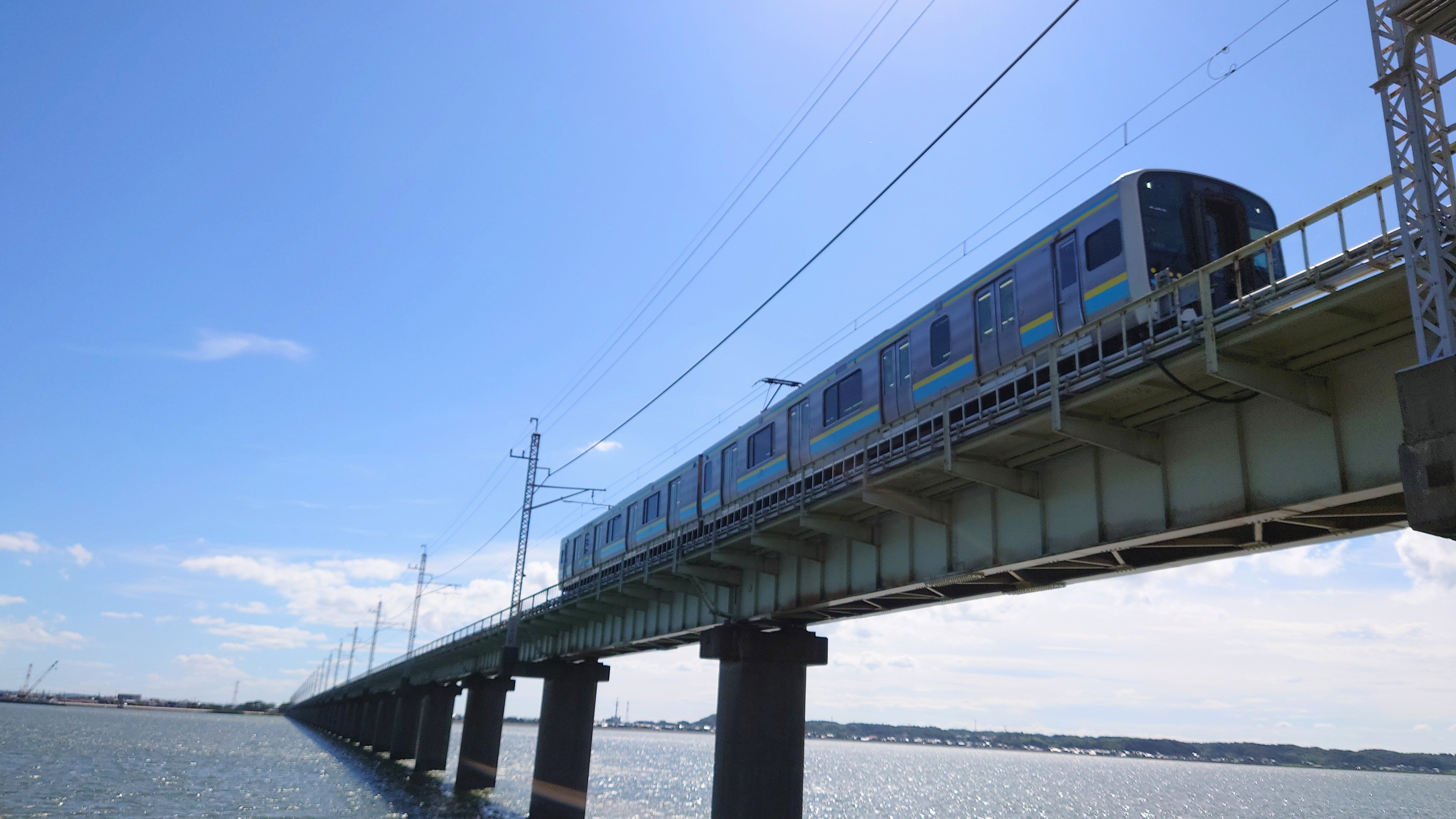
- E131 series train running on the Kitaura Bridge (July 2022)

Overview
- Owner: JR East
- Locale: Chiba Prefecture, Ibaraki Prefecture
- Termini: Katori; Kashimajingū
- Stations: 5

Service
- Type: Heavy rail
- Operator(s): JR East, JR Freight
- Rolling stock: E131 Series; Past: 113 Series, 209 series

History
- Opened: 20 August 1970; 56 years ago

Technical
- Line length: 17.4 km (10.8 mi)
- Track gauge: 1,067 mm (3 ft 6 in)
- Electrification: 1,500 V DC overhead catenary

The Kashima Line (鹿島線, Kashima-sen) is a railway line operated by East Japan Railway Company (JR East). It links Katori Station in Katori, Chiba with Kashimajingū Station in Kashima, Ibaraki. Services continue one station further past Kashimajingū to Kashima Soccer Stadium Station on days when soccer matches are being held at the adjacent Kashima Soccer Stadium.

The line features 3 large bridges - the Tone River Railway Bridge over the Tone River, the Hitachitone River Railway Bridge over the Hitachitone River (the boundary between Chiba Prefecture and Ibaraki Prefecture), and the 1.236 km (4,060 ft) long Kitaura Railway Bridge over Lake Kitaura (itself part of Lake Kasumigaura, Japan's second largest lake).

== Operation ==
All services commence from Sawara Station on the Narita Line (one stop, 3.6 km (2.2 mi) before Katori) then stop at all stations between Katori and Kashimajingū. Trains operate approximately once per hour.

Kashima Line services continue one station further past Kashimajingū to Kashima Soccer Stadium Station on days when soccer matches are being held at the adjacent Kashima Soccer Stadium, the home stadium of Kashima Antlers in J.League (Japan Professional Football League).

At Kashimajingū, passengers can transfer to Kashima Rinkai Railway Ōarai Kashima Line trains to Oarai and Mito. These trains also only stop at Kashima Soccer Stadium Station on days when soccer matches are being held.

Until 2015, the Limited Express Ayame service ran between Tokyo Station and Kashima Jingu once per day, from Kashima Jingu in every morning, from Tokyo in every night, stopping at all stations on the Kashima Line.

JR Freight also operates trains on the Kashima Line from the Tokyo area to the Kashima Rinkai Railway Kashima Rinkō Line. Trains change direction at Kashima Soccer Stadium Station.

== Stations ==
Station	Japanese	Distance (km) (from Katori)	Transfers	Location	
Sawara	佐原	-3.6	Narita Line (for Narita and Chiba)	Katori	Chiba Prefecture
Katori	香取	0.0	Narita Line (for Matsugishi and Chōshi)	Katori	Chiba Prefecture
Jūnikyō	十二橋	3.0		Katori	Chiba Prefecture
Itako	潮来	5.2		Itako	Ibaraki Prefecture
Nobukata	延方	10.4		Itako	Ibaraki Prefecture
Kashimajingū	鹿島神宮	14.2	Kashima Rinkai Railway Ōarai Kashima Line	Kashima	Ibaraki Prefecture
Services continue to/from Kashima Soccer Stadium Station only on days when soccer matches are being held at the adjacent Kashima Soccer Stadium				Kashima	Ibaraki Prefecture
Kashima Soccer Stadium (temporary station)	鹿島サッカースタジアム	17.4	Kashima Rinkai Railway Kashima Rinkō Line (freight line); Kashima Rinkai Railway Ōarai Kashima Line	Kashima	Ibaraki Prefecture

== History ==
This line was planned as the main mass transportation method within the Kashima Industrial Zone along the southern coast of Ibaraki Prefecture, to connect with the Tokyo Metropolis.

- 20 August 1970 – Newly operated between Katori and Kashimajingū (14.2 km (8.8 mi)), as JNR Kashima Line.
- 12 November 1970 – Newly operated between Kashimajingū and Kita-Kashima (3.2 km (2.0 mi)), as the freight line.
- 24 October 1974 – The line was electrified.
- March 1978 – Jet airplane fuel transport service was started from Kashima Rinkai Kashima Rinko Line (owned by Kashima Rinkai Railway), via Kita-Kashima Station, to Tsuchiya Freight Terminal Station, near Narita Station, to supply New Tokyo International Airport.
- 25 July 1978, Passenger service was begun between Kashimajingū and Kita-Kashima, as the beginning of passenger service in Kashima Rinko Line.
- 8 August 1983 – Jet fuel freight line ended (pipelines came on service).
- 1 December 1983 – The passenger service between Kashimajingū and Kita-Kashima was abolished, which was started in 1978.
- 14 March 1985 – The passenger service was re-opened in the section between Kashima- Jingu and Kita-Kashima, as the opening of Kashima Rinkai Oarai Kashima Line.
- 1 April 1987 – JR East succeeded this line from JNR.
- 12 March 1994 – Kita-Kashima Station was renamed to Kashima-Soccer-Stadium Station, and it served as a temporary station for football spectators in Kashima Stadium.
- 2 June 2002 – 2002 FIFA World Cup game, Argentina – Nigeria was played in Kashima Stadium. JR East operated special trains between Chiba Station to Kashima-Soccer-Stadium Station, as special rapid trains.

== Rolling stock ==
- E131 series 2-car EMUs (since 13 March 2021)

Sōbu Line (Rapid) through service

- E235-1000 series 4-car EMUs

=== Past ===
- 113 series EMUs
- 183 series EMUs (Ayame limited express services)
- 209-2000/2100 series 4-car EMUs (until 12 March 2021)
- E257-500 series (Ayame limited express services until 13 March 2015)
- E217 series 4-car EMUs (until 15 March 2025)
