= Katori Station =

Railway station in Katori, Chiba Prefecture, Japan

Katori Station 香取駅
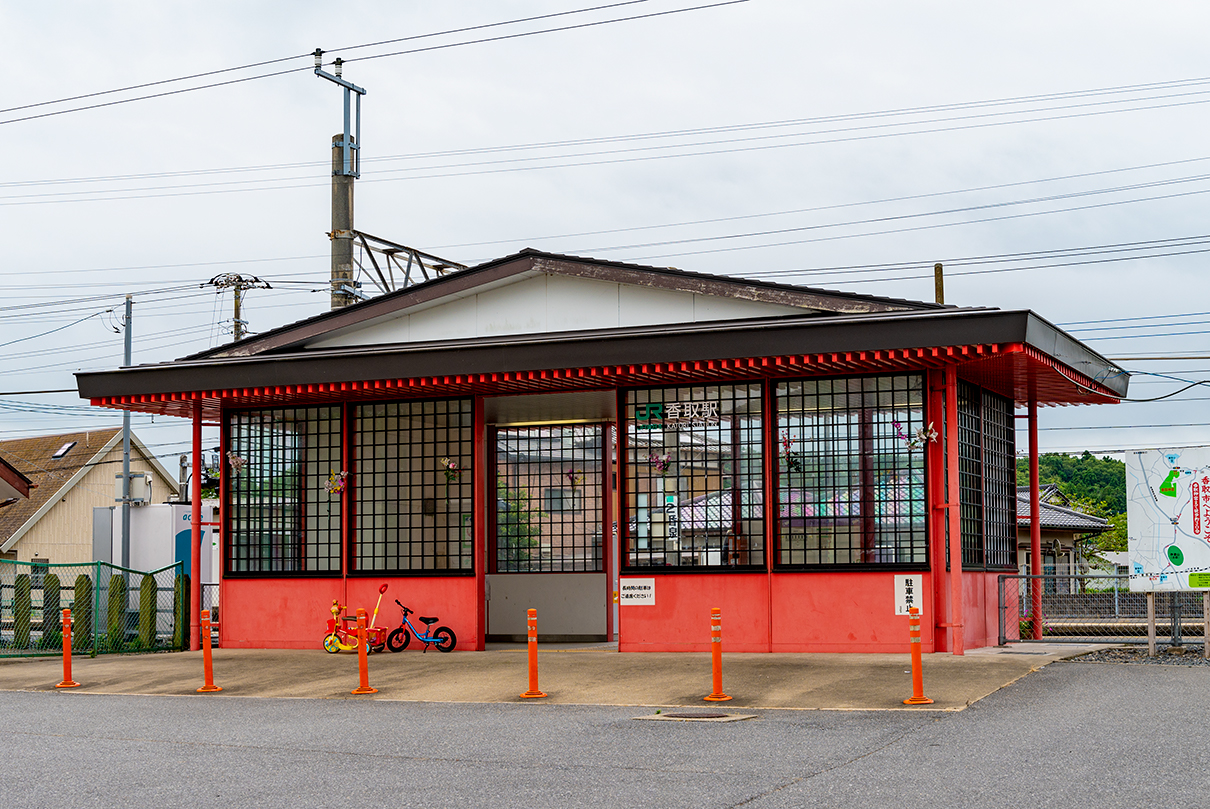
- Station shelter after rebuilding, June 2020

General information
- Location: 1428 Tsunomiya, Katori-shi, Chiba-ken 287-0011; Japan
- Coordinates: 35.8976°N 140.5322°E
- Operator: JR East
- Lines: ■ Kashima Line; ■ Narita Line
- Distance: 43.6 km from Sakura
- Platforms: 2 side platforms

Other information
- Status: Unstaffed
- Website: Official website

History
- Opened: November 10, 1931

Passengers
- FY2006: 232

Services
Preceding station	JR East	Following station
Sawara towards Chiba	Narita Line	Suigō towards Chōshi
Sawara Terminus	Kashima Line	Jūnikyō towards Kashima Soccer Stadium
Location
- Location within Chiba Prefecture Location within Japan

Katori Station (香取駅, Katori-eki) a junction passenger railway station in the city of Katori, Chiba, Japan, operated by the East Japan Railway Company (JR East).

== Lines ==
Katori Station is served by the Narita Line, and is located 43.6 kilometers from the terminus of line at Sakura Station. It is also the nominal terminal station for the Kashima Line, although all Kashima Line trains terminate at Sawara Station.

== Station layout ==
The station has two opposed side platforms connected by a footbridge to a small single-story station building. The station is unattended.

=== Platforms ===
1	■ Narita Line	for Sawara , Narita, Sakura, and Chiba for Sasagawa and Chōshi
1	■ Kashima Line	for Kashima-Jingū
2	■ Narita Line	Sawara , Narita, Sakura, and Chiba

== History ==
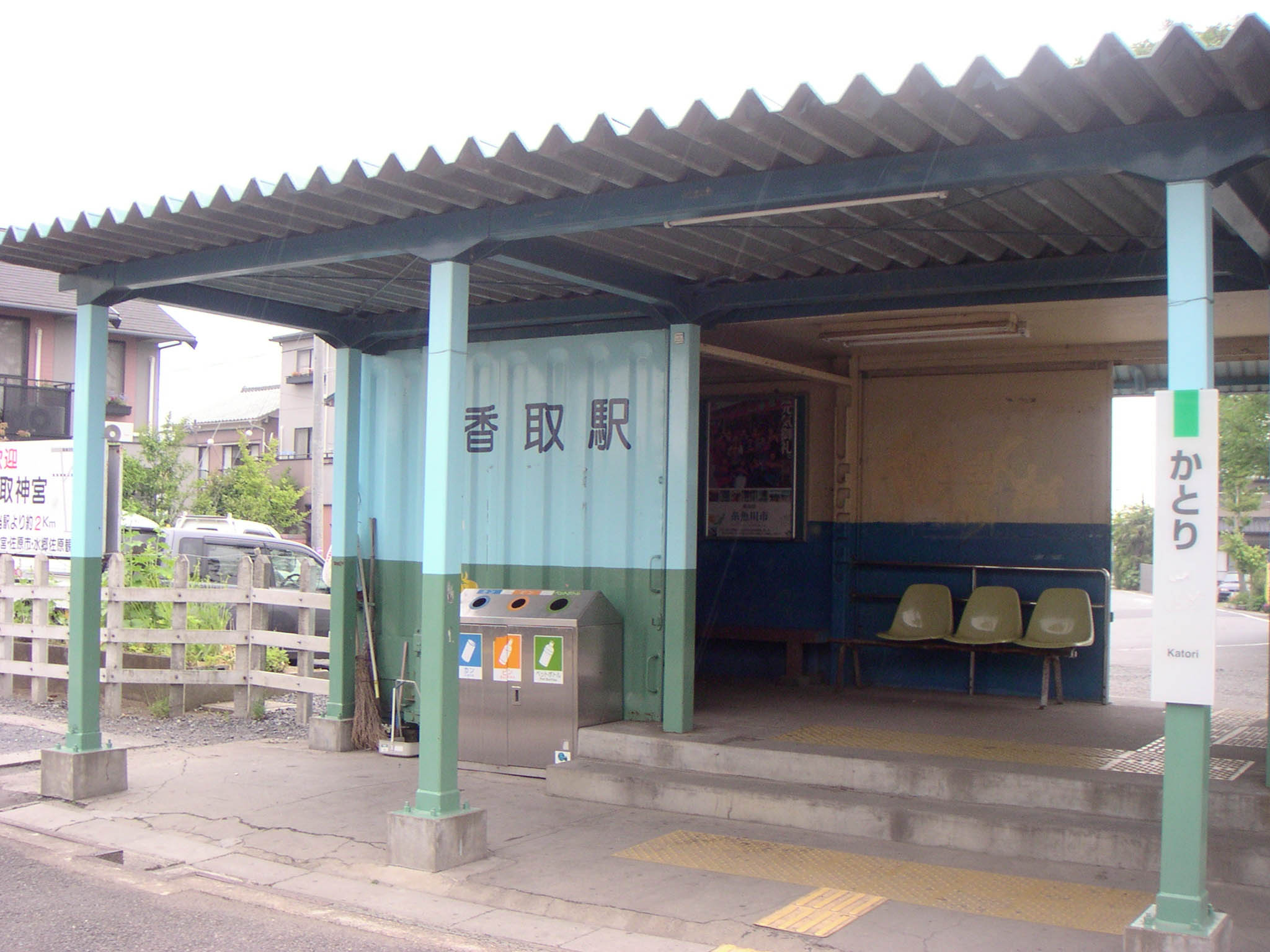
Previous station structure, converted from a former freight wagon, May 2005

Katori Station was opened on November 10, 1931. The station building was replaced in 1986. The station was absorbed into the JR East network upon the privatization of the Japanese National Railways (JNR) on April 1, 1987.

== Passenger statistics ==
In fiscal 2006, the station was used by an average of 232 passengers daily.

== Surrounding area ==
- Katori Middle School
- National Route 356

== See also ==
- List of railway stations in Japan
