= Kashima Soccer Stadium Station =

Railway station in Kashima, Ibaraki Prefecture, Japan

Kashima Soccer Stadium Station 鹿島サッカースタジアム駅
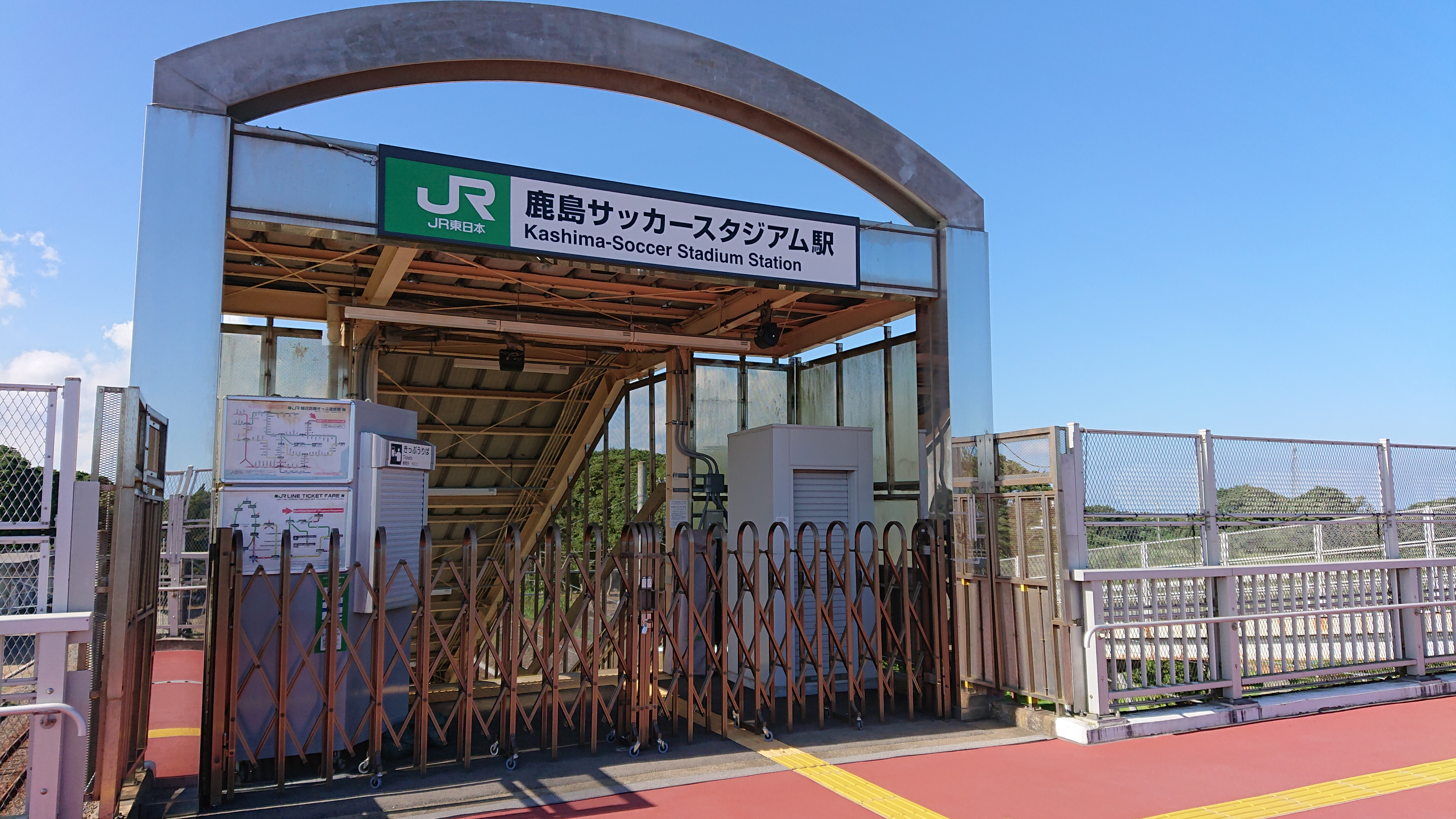
- Entrance of the station in August 2021

General information
- Other names: Kashima-Soccer Stadium Station (JR East)
- Location: Jinkoji 4980, Kashima-shi, Ibaraki-ken 314-0031; Japan
- Coordinates: 35°59′33.78″N 140°38′9.87″E
- Operator: JR East (manager); Kashima Rinkai Tetsudo
- Lines: ■ Kashima Line; ■ Kashima Rinkō Line; ■ Ōarai-Kashima Line
- Distance: 17.4 km from Katori
- Platforms: 2 (1 island platform)

Construction
- Structure type: At-grade

Other information
- Status: Staffed
- Website: Official website

History
- Opened: November 12, 1970
- Former names: Kita-Kashima (until 1994)

Passengers
- FY2019: 411(daily)

Services
Preceding station	JR East	Following station
Kashimajingū towards Sawara	Kashima Line Match days only	Terminus
Preceding station	Kashima Rinkai Railway	Following station
Kashimajingū Terminus	Ōarai Kashima Line Match days only	Kōyadai towards Mito
Location
- Location within Ibaraki Prefecture Location within Japan

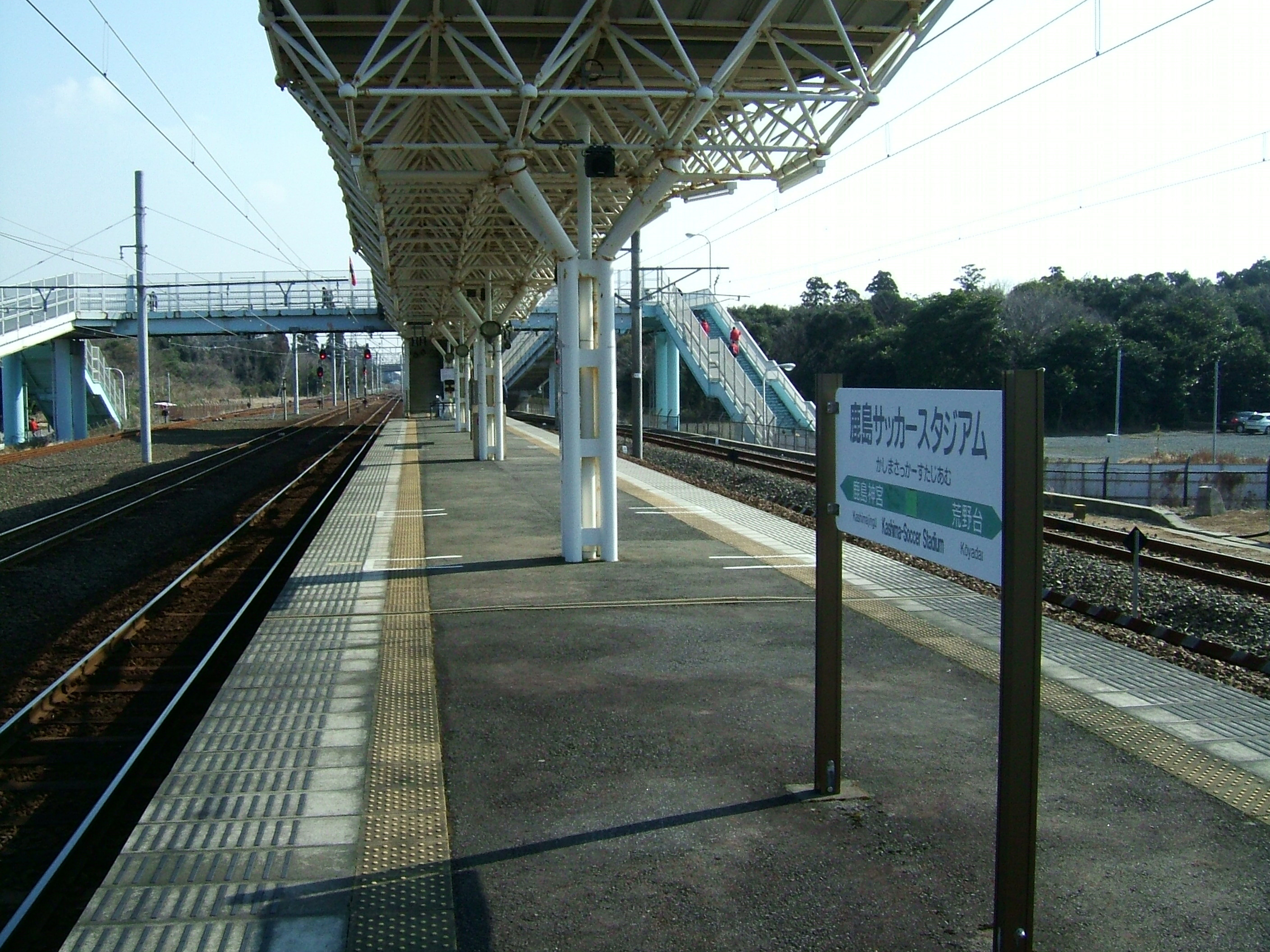
Platform

Kashima Soccer Stadium Station (鹿島サッカースタジアム駅, Kashima Sakkā Sutajiamu-eki), referred to as Kashima-Soccer Stadium Station by JR East, is a joint-use junction passenger railway station in the city of Kashima, Ibaraki Prefecture, Japan, operated by the East Japan Railway Company (JR East) and the third sector Kashima Rinkai Railway. The station premises are managed by JR East. The station is open to passengers only when there is a football match at the nearby Kashima Soccer Stadium. The station is also a freight depot for the freight-only Kashima Rinkō Line to the Okunoyahama Freight Terminal.

== Lines ==
Kashima Soccer Stadium Station is served by the Kashima Line, and is located 17.4 km from the official starting point of the line at Katori Station. It is 53.0 kilometers from the terminus of the Ōarai Kashima Line at Mito Station.

== Layout ==
The station consists of one island platform connected to the station building by a footbridge, serving two tracks as well as separate tracks for freight trains. The station is staffed.

=== Platforms ===
1	■ Ōarai Kashima Line	for Ōarai and Mito
2	■ Ōarai Kashima Line	for Sawara andŌarai and Mito
2	■ Kashima Line	for Sawara and Narita and Tokyo (limited basis)

== History ==
The station opened on November 12, 1970, as a freight terminal named Kita-Kashima Station (北鹿島駅, Kita-Kashima eki). It formed the boundary between Japanese National Railways (Kashima Line) and Kashima Rinkai Railway (Kashima Rinkō Line).

Although the Kashima Rinkō Line provided passenger services between July 25, 1978, and December 1, 1983, and the Ōarai Kashima Line opened on March 14, 1985, for both freight and passenger traffic, Kita-Kashima Station was not used by passenger services. The station was absorbed into the JR East network upon the privatization of the Japanese National Railways (JNR) on 1 April 1987.

On March 12, 1994, the station was renamed to its present name and passenger services began on a limited basis (only on days when there is a game at Kashima Soccer Stadium).

== Passenger statistics ==
In fiscal 2019, the JR station was used by an average of 411 passengers daily (boarding passengers only).

== Surrounding area ==
- Kashima Soccer Stadium
- National Route 51

== See also ==
- List of railway stations in Japan
