= Kashimajingū Station =

Railway station in Kashima, Ibaraki Prefecture, Japan

Kashimajingū Station 鹿島神宮駅
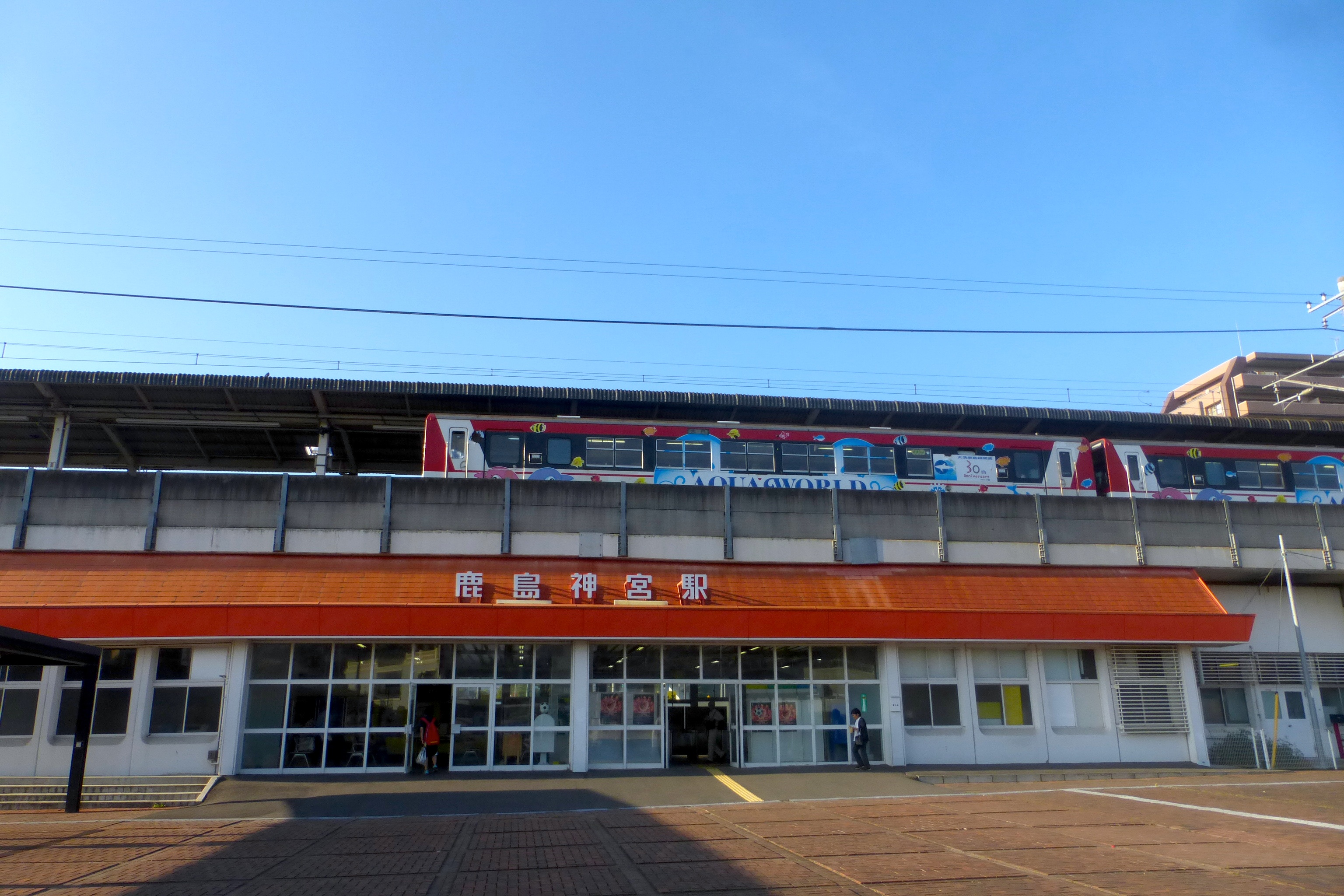
- Kashimajingū Station September 2015

General information
- Location: Miyashita 4-chome, Kashima-shi, Ibaraki-ken 314-0032; Japan
- Coordinates: 35.9706°N 140.6254°E
- Operator: JR East; Kashima Rinkai Tetsudo
- Lines: ■ Kashima Line; ■ Ōarai-Kashima Line
- Distance: 14.2 km from Katori
- Platforms: 2 (1 island platform)

Construction
- Structure type: Elevated

Other information
- Status: Staffed
- Website: Official website

History
- Opened: August 20, 1970

Passengers
- FY2019: 968(daily)

Services
Preceding station	JR East	Following station
Itako towards Sawara	Kashima Line	Terminus
Itako towards Sawara	Kashima Line	Kashima Soccer Stadium (Match days only) Terminus
Preceding station	Kashima Rinkai Railway	Following station
Terminus	Ōarai Kashima Line	Kōyadai towards Mito
Terminus	Ōarai Kashima Line	Kashima Soccer Stadium (Match days only) towards Mito
Location
- Location within Ibaraki Prefecture Location within Japan

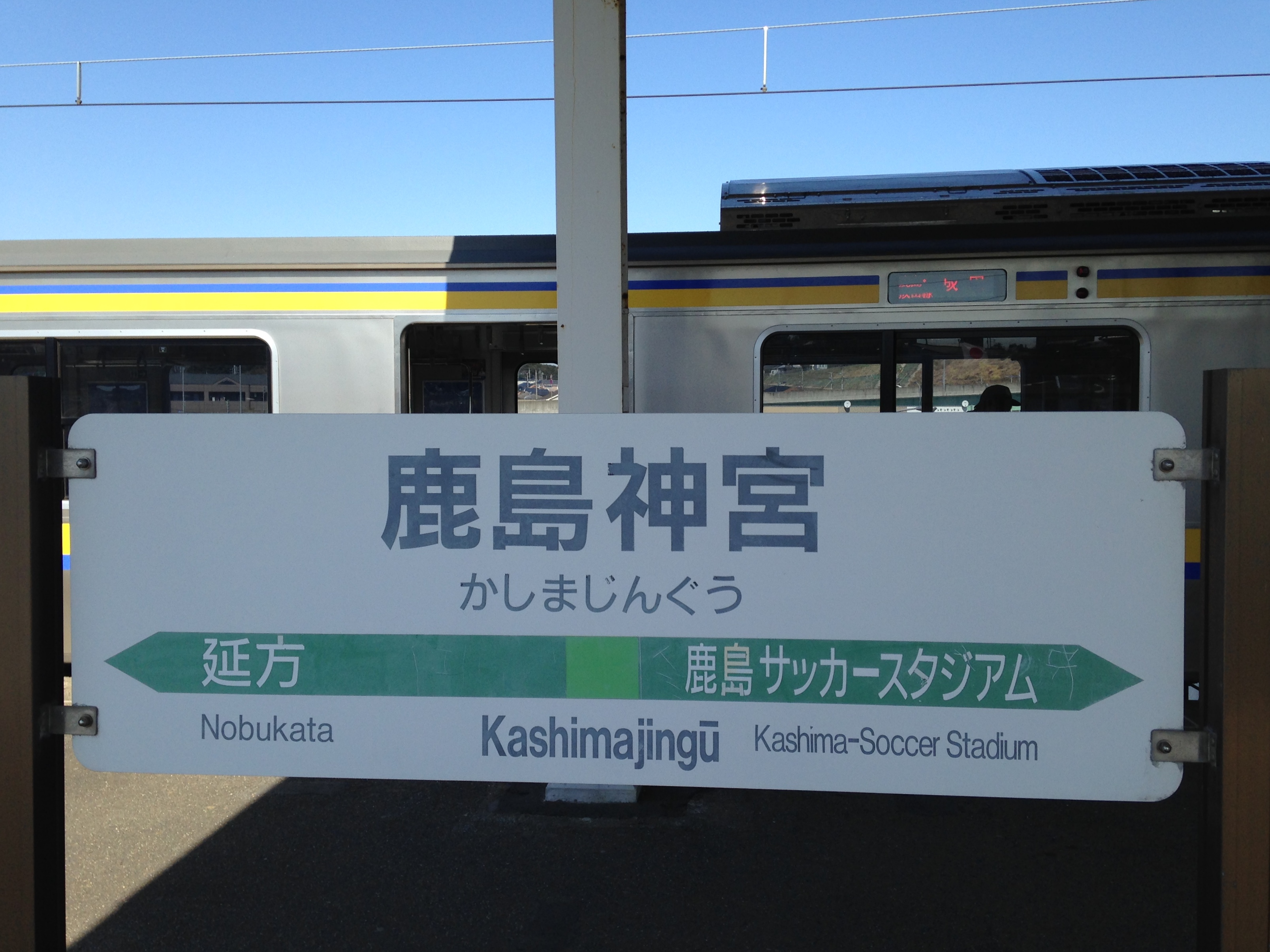
Signboard of Kashimajingū Station

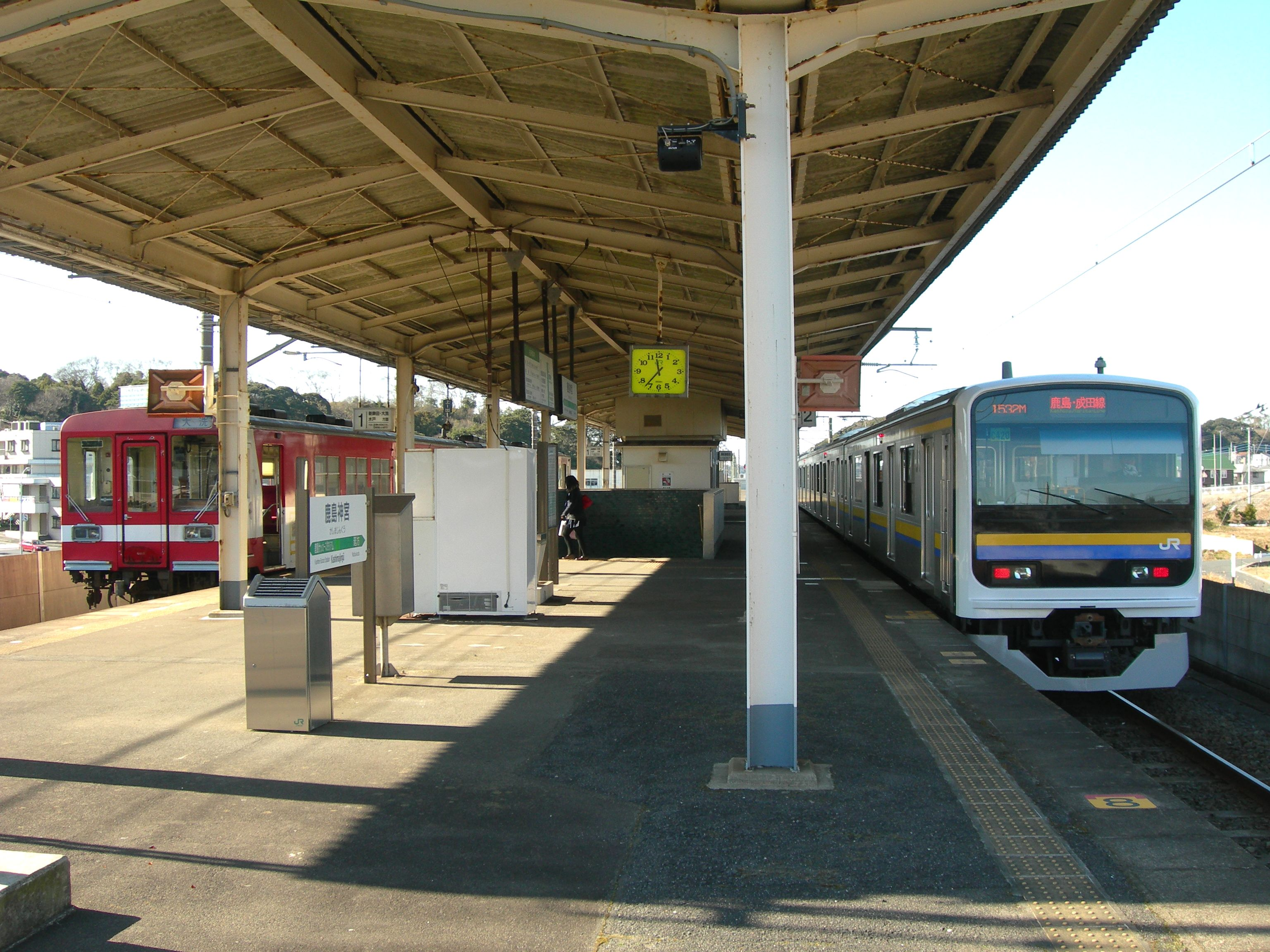
Platform of Kashimajingū Station

Kashimajingū Station (鹿島神宮駅, Kashima-Jingū-eki) is a junction passenger railway station located in the city of Kashima, Ibaraki Prefecture, Japan, operated by the East Japan Railway Company (JR East) and the by the third sector Kashima Rinkai Railway.

== Lines ==
Kashimajingū Station is served by the Kashima Line, and is located 14.2 km from the official starting point of the line at Katori Station. The station is also served by the trains of the Ōarai Kashima Line. The adjacent Kashima Soccer Stadium Station is the boundary of the Kashima Line and the Ōarai Kashima Line.

== Station layout ==
The station consists of one elevated island platform with the station building underneath. The station is staffed.

=== Platforms ===
1	■ Ōarai Kashima Line	for Kashima Soccer Stadium, Ōarai and Mito
2	■ Kashima Line	for Sawara and Narita and Tokyo

== History ==
The station opened on August 20, 1970. The station was absorbed into the JR East network upon the privatization of the Japanese National Railways (JNR) on 1 April 1987.

== Passenger statistics ==
In fiscal 2019, the JR station was used by an average of 968 passengers daily (boarding passengers only).

== Surrounding area ==
- Kashima Shrine

== Bus routes ==
- For Tokyo Station or Tokyo Disney Resort
- For Choshi Station
- For Asō Onsen "Shiraho no Yu" via Itako Station and Suigō-Itako Bus Terminal

== See also ==
- List of railway stations in Japan
