= Sawara Station =

Railway station in Katori, Chiba Prefecture, Japan

Sawara Station 佐原駅
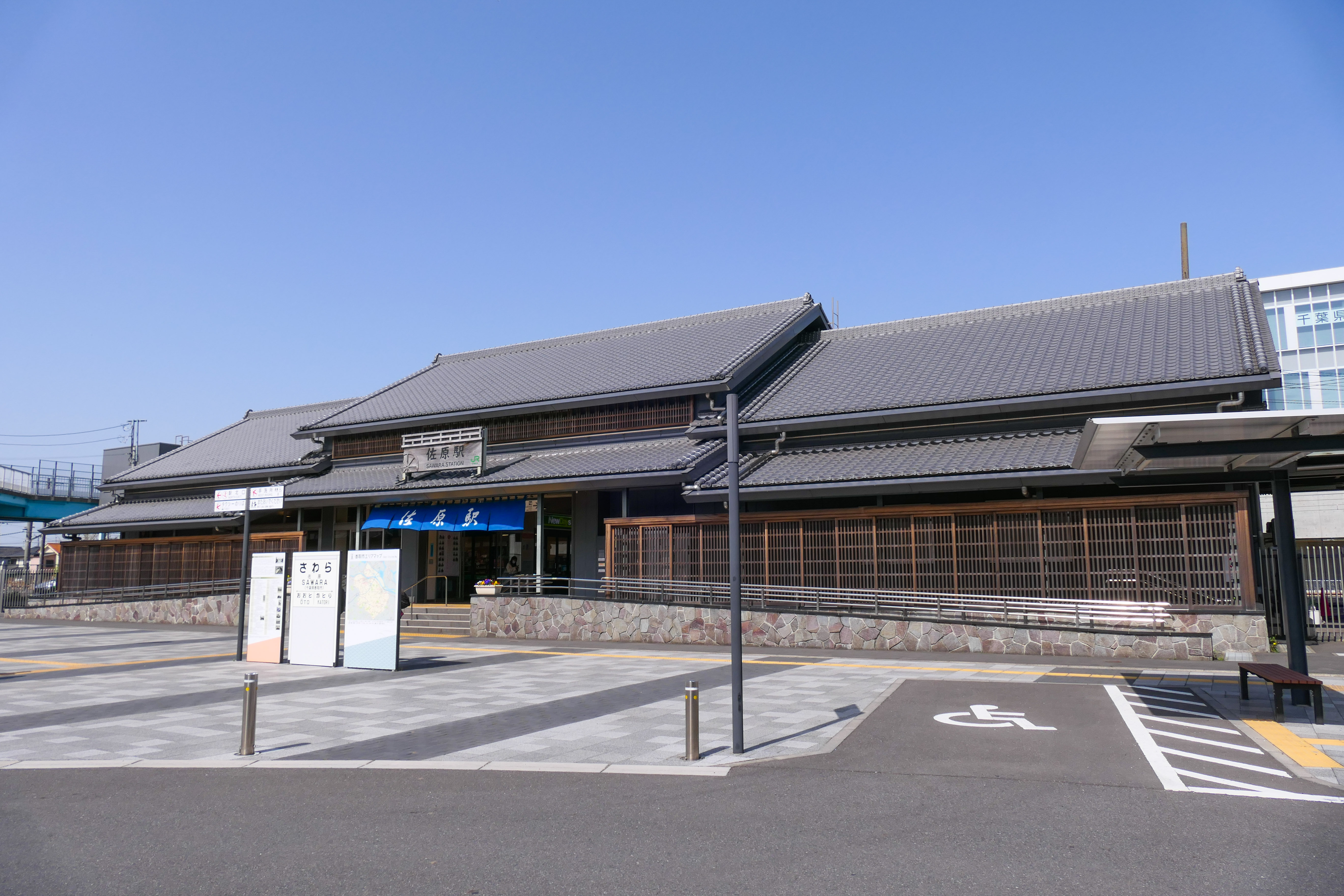
- Sawara Station

General information
- Location: Sawara 74, Katori-shi, Chiba-ken 287-0003; Japan
- Coordinates: 35.8947°N 140.4939°E
- Operator: JR East
- Lines: ■ Kashima Line; ■ Narita Line
- Distance: 40.0 km from Sakura
- Platforms: 1 bay + 1 island platforms

Other information
- Status: Staffed (Midori no Madoguchi)
- Website: Official website

History
- Opened: February 3, 1898

Passengers
- FY2019: 3090

Services
Preceding station	JR East	Following station
Ōto towards Chiba	Narita Line	Katori towards Chōshi
Terminus	Kashima Line	Katori towards Kashima Soccer Stadium
Location
- Location within Chiba Prefecture Location within Japan

Sawara Station (佐原駅, Sawara-eki) is a passenger railway station in the city of Katori, Chiba, Japan, operated by the East Japan Railway Company (JR East).

== Lines ==
Sawara Station is served by the Narita Line, and is located 40.0 kilometers from the terminus of line at Sakura Station. Some trains for the Kashima Line originate at this station.

== Layout ==
Sawara Station has a single bay platform serving two tracks, and an island platform, for a total of four tracks. The island platform is connected to the bay platform by a footbridge. The station has a Midori no Madoguchi staffed ticket office.

=== Platforms ===
0	■ Kashima Line	For Kashima-Jingū
1	■ Narita Line	For Choshi
1	■ Kashima Line	For Kashima-Jingū
2&3	■ Narita Line	For Narita, Sakura, Chiba, Tokyo

== History ==
Sawara Station was opened on February 3, 1898 as a terminal station on the Narita Railway Company for both freight and passenger operations. The Narita Railway was nationalised on September 1, 1920, becoming part of the Japanese Government Railway (JGR). The line was extended to Sasagawa on November 10, 1931. After World War II, the JGR became the Japan National Railways (JNR). Scheduled freight operations were suspended from February 1, 1984. The station was absorbed into the JR East network upon the privatization of the Japan National Railways (JNR) on April 1, 1987. The station building was rebuilt from 2007 to 2011.

== Passenger statistics ==
In fiscal 2019, the station was used by an average of 3090 passengers daily (boarding passengers only).

== Surrounding area ==
- old town of Sawara
- Ino Tadataka Museum
- Katori City Hall

=== Bus Terminal ===
- Ōtō Bus
  - For Koyo Chuo
  - For Koda Shako
  - Edosaki
- JR Bus Kanto
  - For Tako Bus Terminal
- Chiba Kotso
  - For Takodai Bus Terminal
  - For Omigawa Station
- Keisei Bus, Kanto Railway and Chiba Kotsu
  - For Namba Station
  - For Kyoto Station
  - For Tokyo Station
  - For Hokota Station via Itako Station
  - For Choshi Station via Omigawa Station

== See also ==
- List of railway stations in Japan
