= Mawatari Haniwa Production Site =

- 馬渡埴輪製作遺跡 (Japanese)
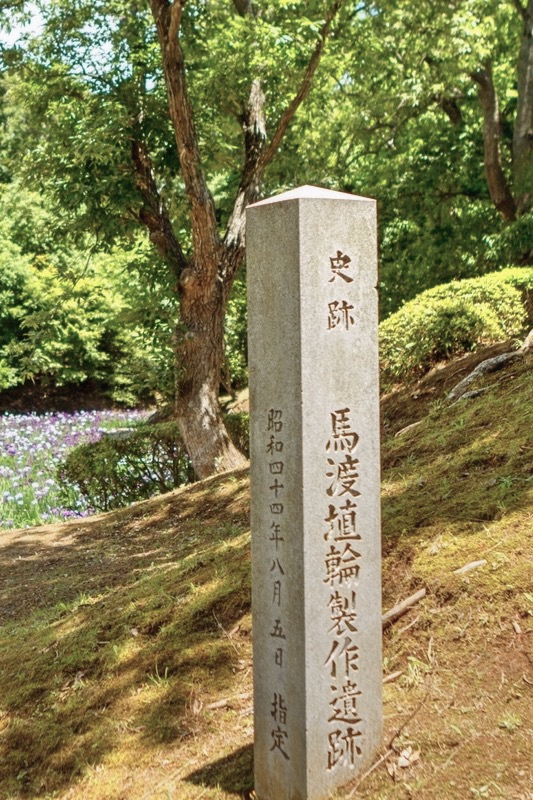
- Mawatari Haniwa Production Site

- Mawatari Haniwa Production Site Mawatari Haniwa Production Site (Japan)
- 36°24′08″N 140°33′41″E
- Periods: Kofun period
- Location: Hitachinaka, Ibaraki Japan
- Region: Kantō region

History
- Built: 5th century to the 6th century AD

Site notes
- Area: 18,514 m^{2} (199,280 sq ft)
- Public access: Yes (public park)

The Mawatari Haniwa Production Site (馬渡埴輪製作遺跡, Mawatari haniwa seisaku iseki) is an archaeological site with the ruins of a Kofun period factory for the production of haniwa clay funerary ceramics, located in what is now the city of Hitachinaka in Ibaraki Prefecture in the northern Kantō region of Japan. It received protection as a National Historic Site in 1969, with the area under protection expanded in 1975.

== Overview ==
The Mawatari site is located on the banks of the Hongo River, a tributary of the Naka River. Per an archaeological excavation conducted in 1965, 25 clay mining pits, 12 workshops, two pit dwellings, and 19 kilns were found in three locations on a plateau overlooking long and narrow paddy fields. Above these ruins, two middens filled with shards of haniwa were also identified. The site has been excavated some 20 times from 1965 to 1991, and many haniwa in various configurations, including cylindrical, horse-shaped, and human-shaped as wells the iron tools used by craftsmen have been found. The site is believed to date from the end of the 5th century to the 6th century AD.

The Kasaya Kofun Group, the Torazuka Kofun Group, and the Nagahori Kofun Group are located about two kilometers from this site, which is considered to be the source of haniwa used at those tumuli. The site has been backfilled after excavations, and the area is open to the public as the Mawatari Haniwa Park (馬渡はにわ公園, Mawatari haniwa kōen). It is located a five-minute walk from the "Mawatari" bus stop on the Ibaraki Kotsu Bus from Katsuta Station on the JR East Jōban Line.

== See also ==
- List of Historic Sites of Japan (Ibaraki)
