= Jūgorō Cave Tombs =

Artificial caves in Hitachinaka, Japan

- 十五郎穴横穴群 (Japanese)
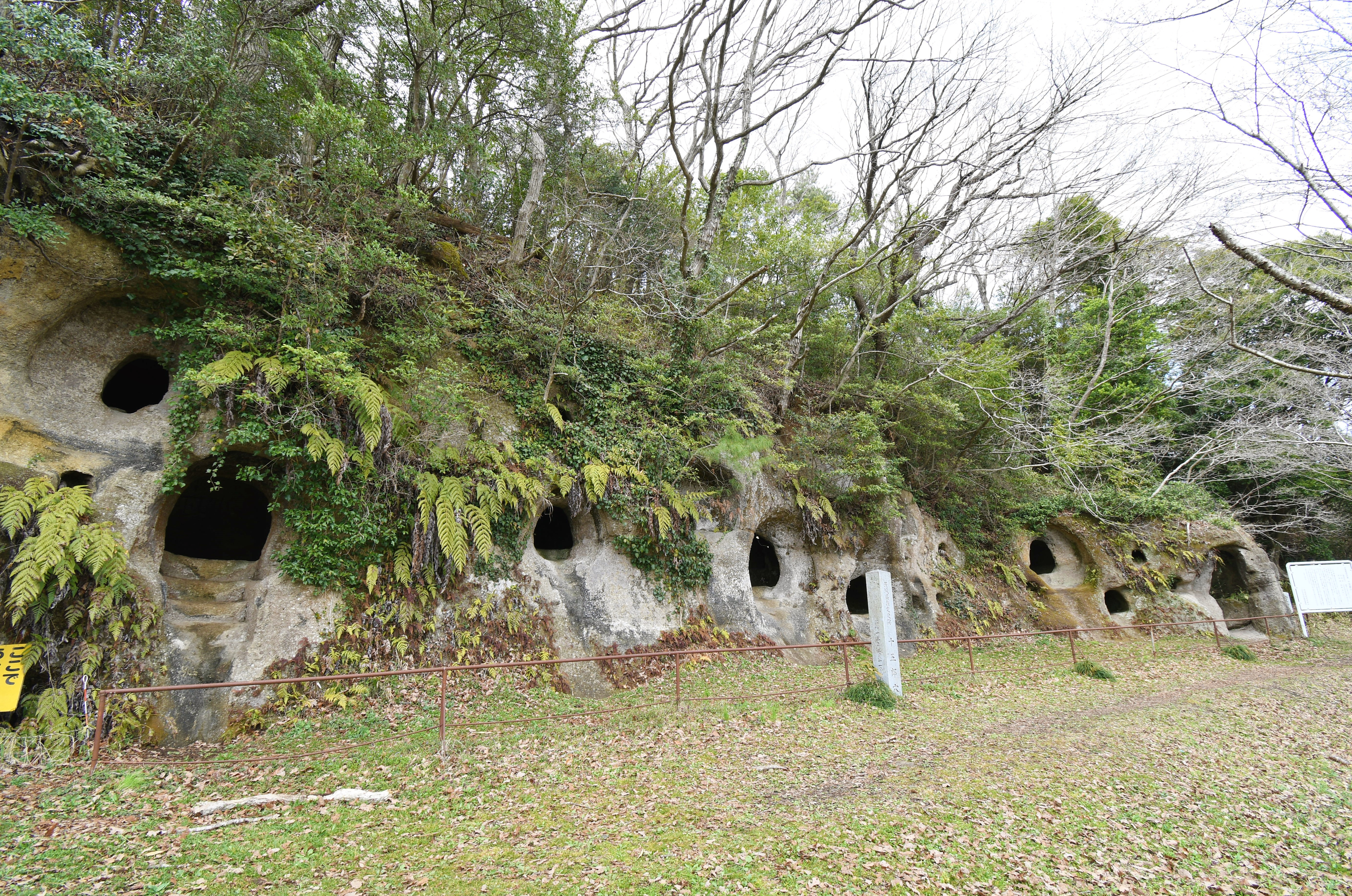
- Tatedashi sub-cluster of the Jūgorō Cave Tombs

- Yokkaichi Cave Tomb Cluster Jūgorō Cave Tombs (Japan)
- Interactive map of Jūgorō Cave Tombs
- 36°22′17.076″N 140°34′12.554″E
- Type: necropolis
- Periods: Kofun - Nara period
- Location: Hitachinaka, Ibaraki, Japan
- Region: Kanto region

History
- Built: 6th-7th century CE

Site notes
- Owner: Public
- Public access: Yes

The Jūgorō Cave Tombs (十五郎穴横穴群, Jūgorō-ana yokoana-gu) is the collective name for a cluster of yokoanabo tombs dug in artificial caves in tuff cliffs in the Sashibu, Tatedashi and Kasaya neighborhoods of the city of Hitachinaka, Ibaraki Prefecture, Japan. It was designated as a National Historic Site in 2024. A total of 272 cave tombs have been confirmed in surveys up to 2014 and the total number is estimated to be over 500, but the exact number is unknown. The name Jūgorō-ana comes from the legend that the Soga Monogatari (Gorō and Jūrō) once hid here.

== Overview ==
In the latter half of the Kofun period, the class of people buried expanded, and mass cemeteries in which a side hole is dug into the slope of a hill to provide a burial chamber began to replace burial mounds. Such cemeteries could contain dozens to hundreds of tombs, with each tomb containing multiple burials.

The Jūgorō Cave Tombs are located on a tongue-shaped plateau sandwiched between the Okawa and Hongo Rivers, tributaries of the Naka River that flow east into the Pacific Ocean. The tombs were dug into the cliffs of the plateau between the early 7th century and the early 9th century, and are distributed across the Sashishibu, Tatedashi, and Kasaya subgroups, which are separated by valleys.

On March 11, 1940, a part of the Tatedashi cluster (34 tombs) was designated as a historic site by Ibaraki Prefecture. In 1950, a large iron sword with a copper square head was excavated from Tomb No. 32 of the Tatedashi cluster. On March 5, 2002, it was designated as a cultural property (archaeological material) designated by Hitachinaka City. During a further archaeological excavation of the Tatedashi cluster in 2011, an iron sword with ornamental metal fittings and a warabi-hilt sword were excavated from Tomb No. 35. The sword has similarities to the a sword in the Shōsōin Repository. This is the second time a warabi-hilt sword has been found in Ibaraki Prefecture.

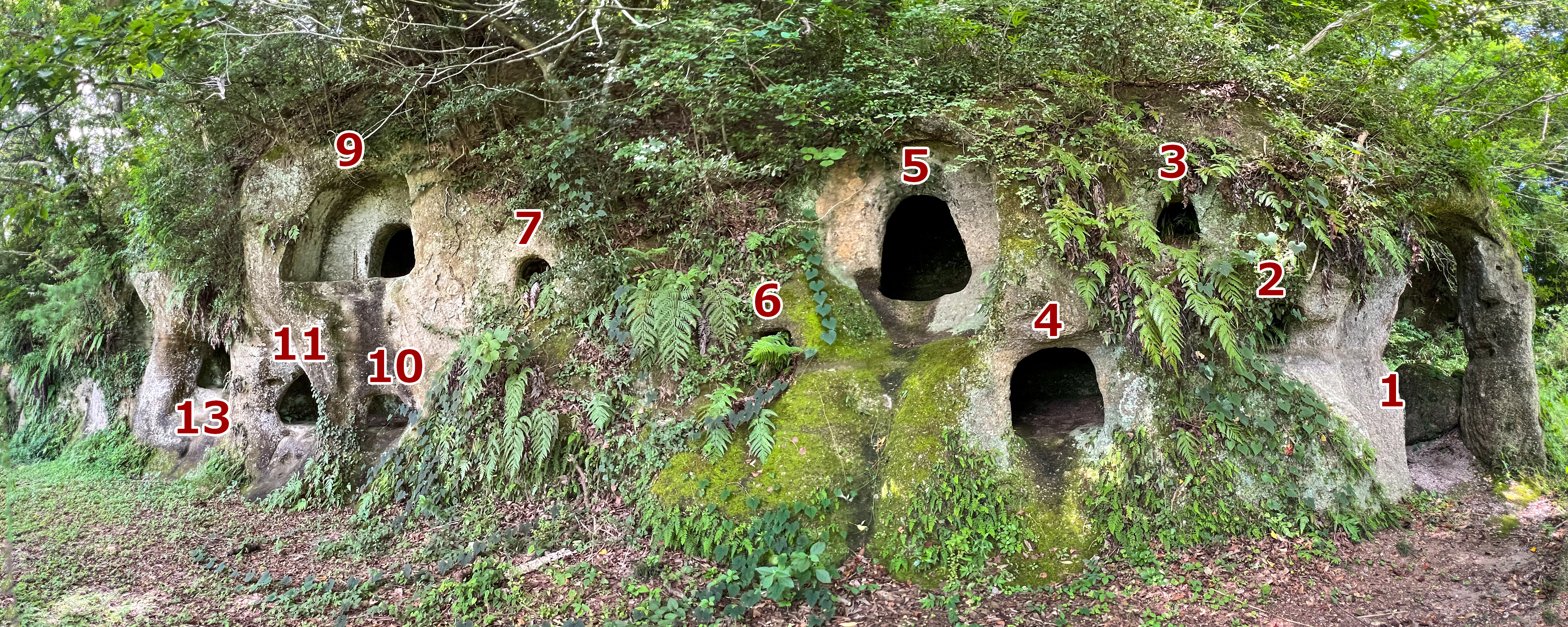
Tomb No.1-13

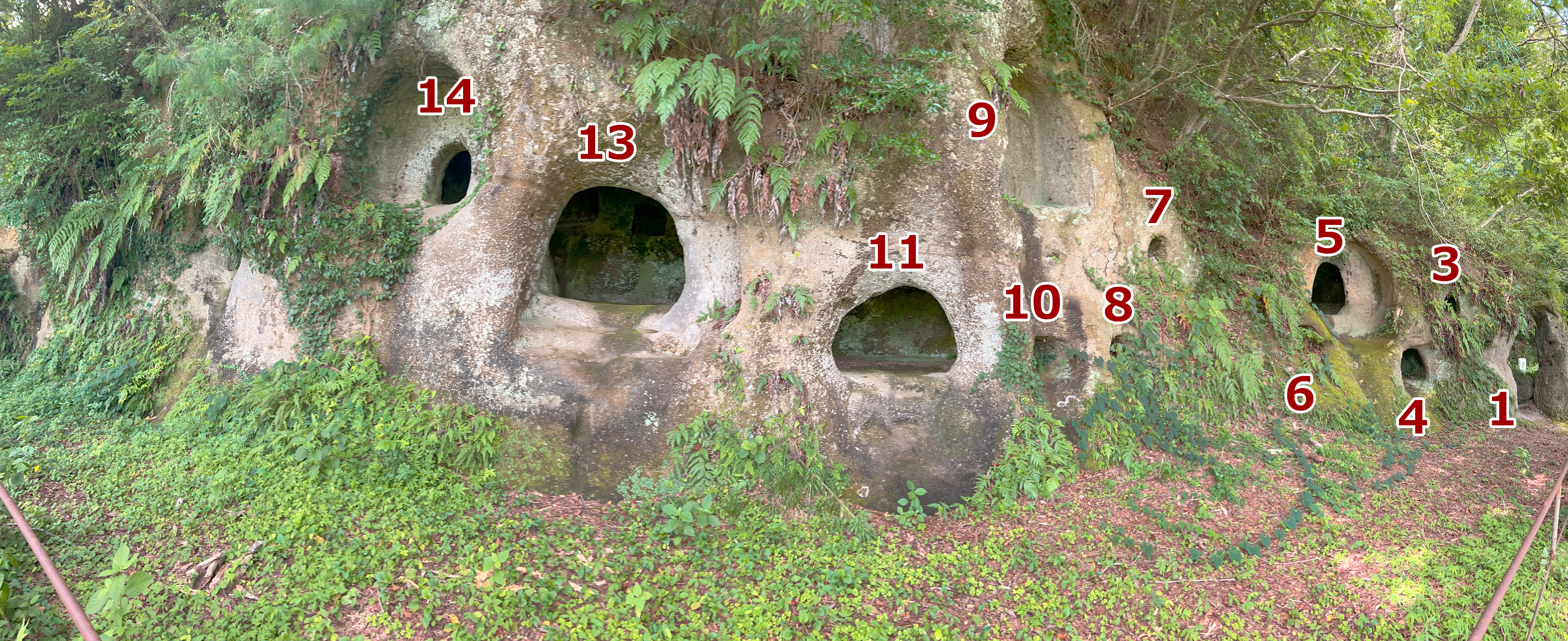
Tomb No.1-14

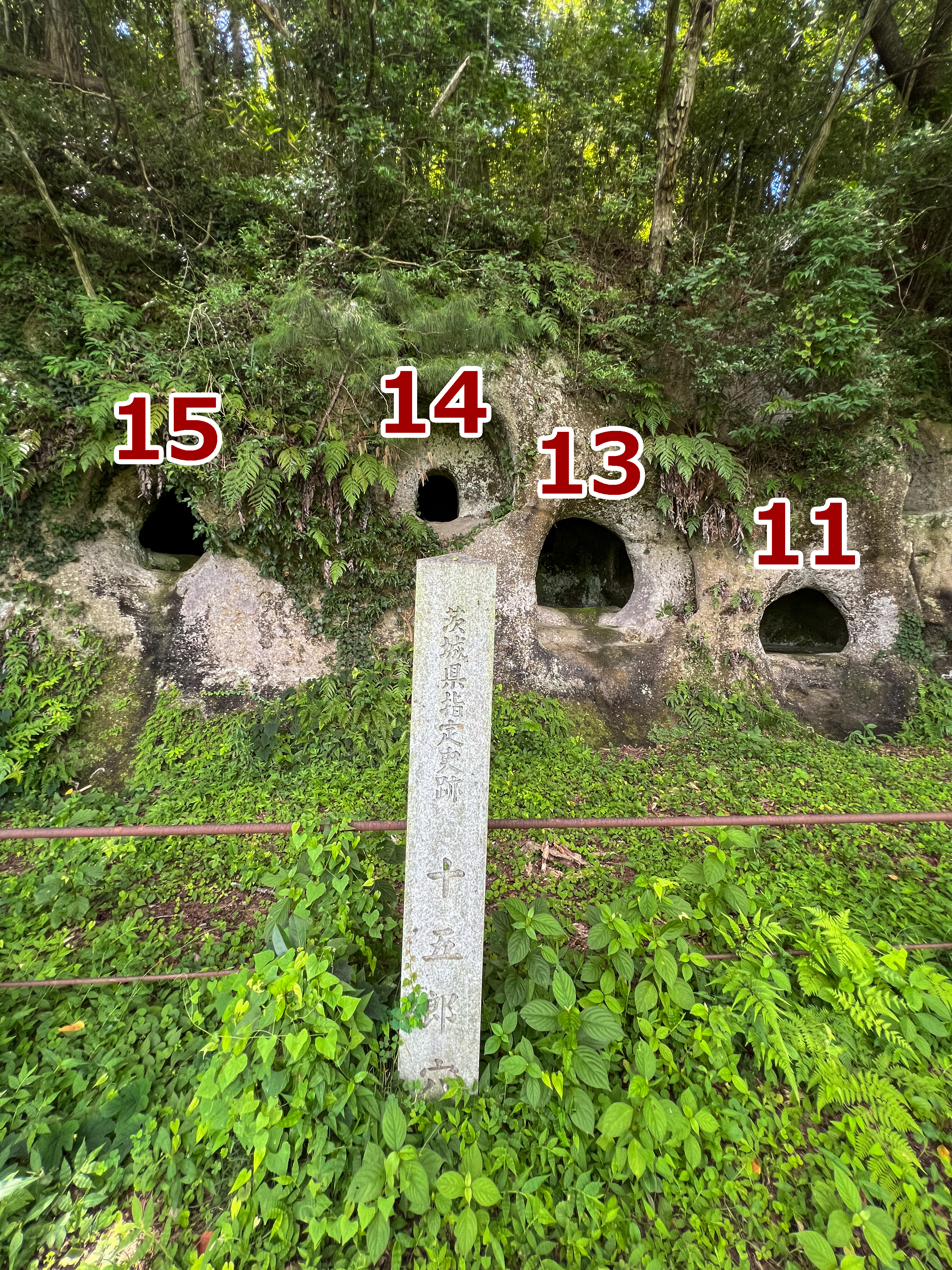
Tomb No.11-15

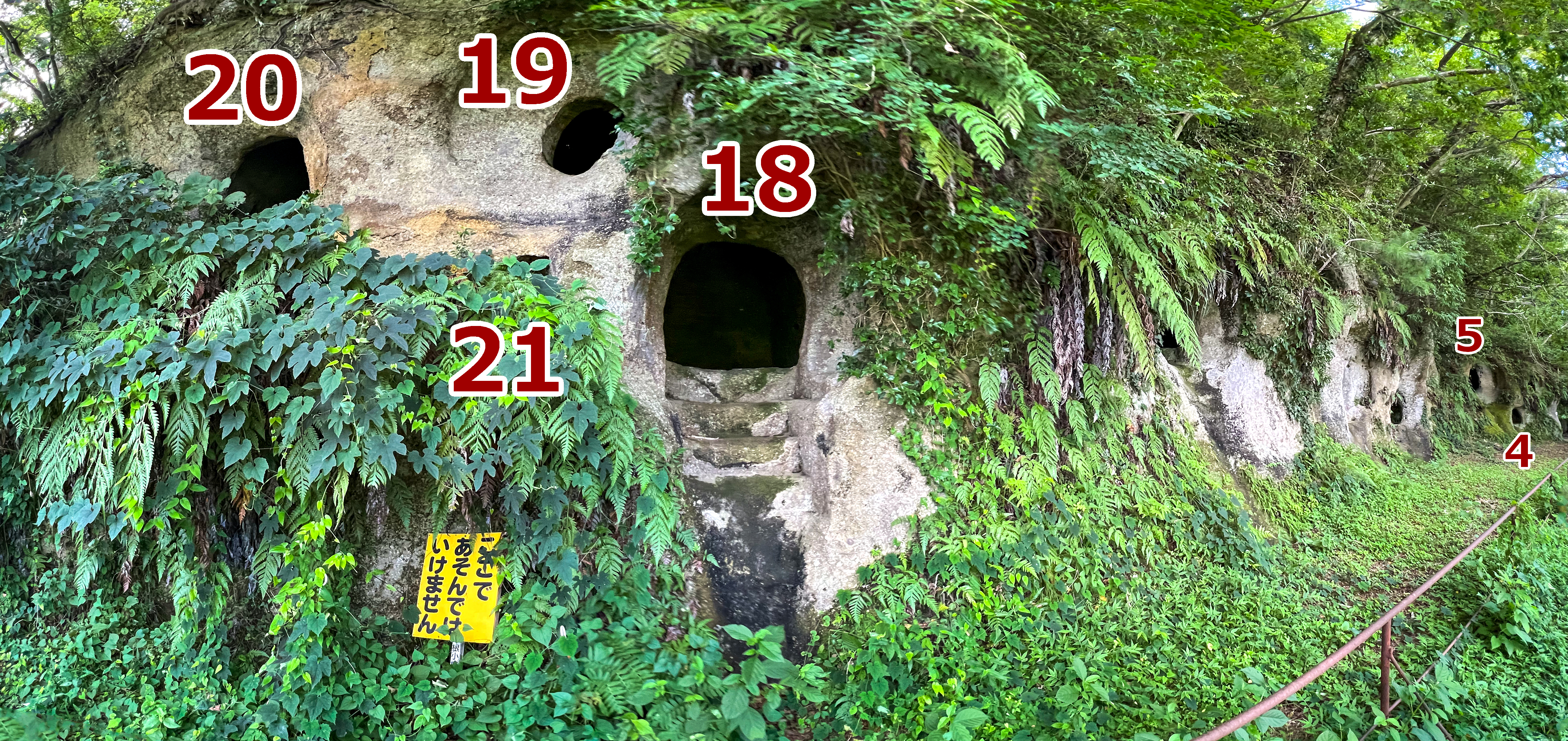
Tomb No.18-21

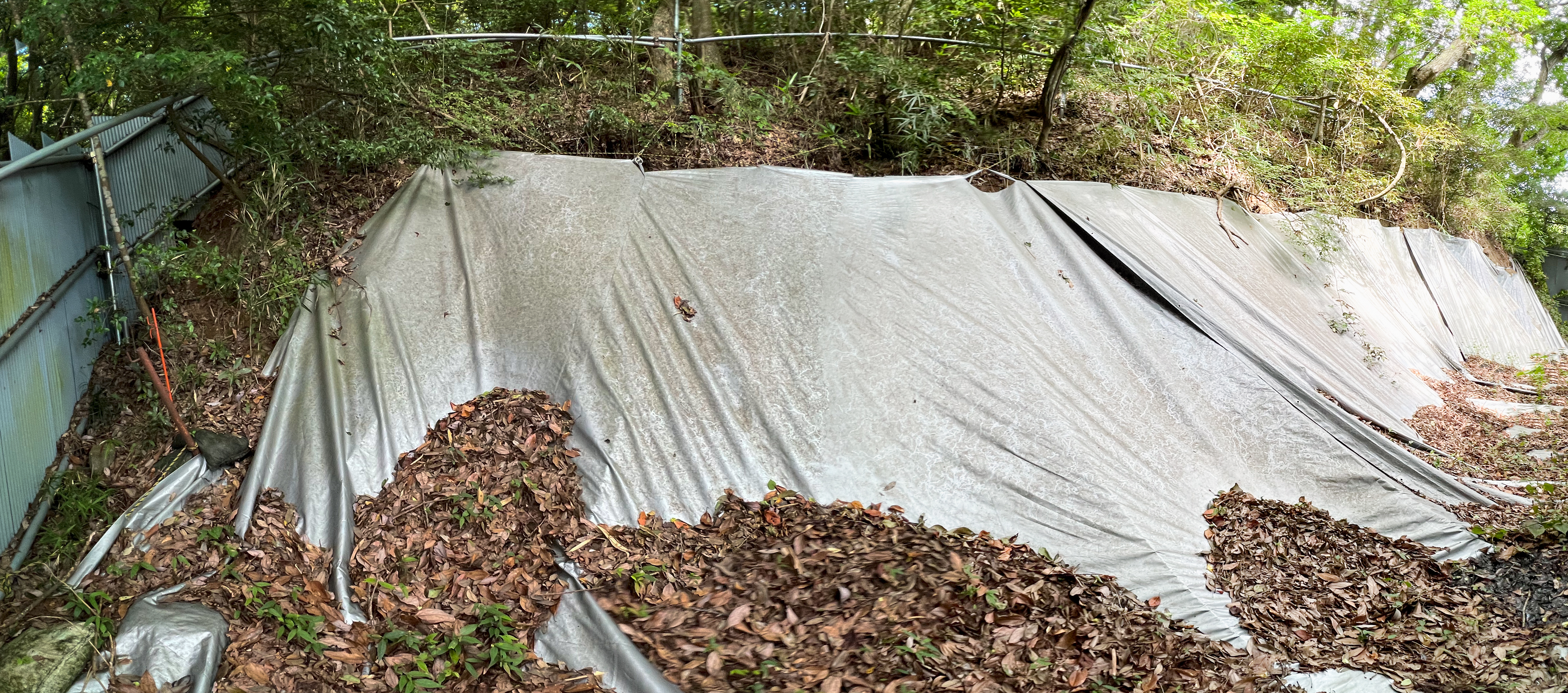
omb No.32-35

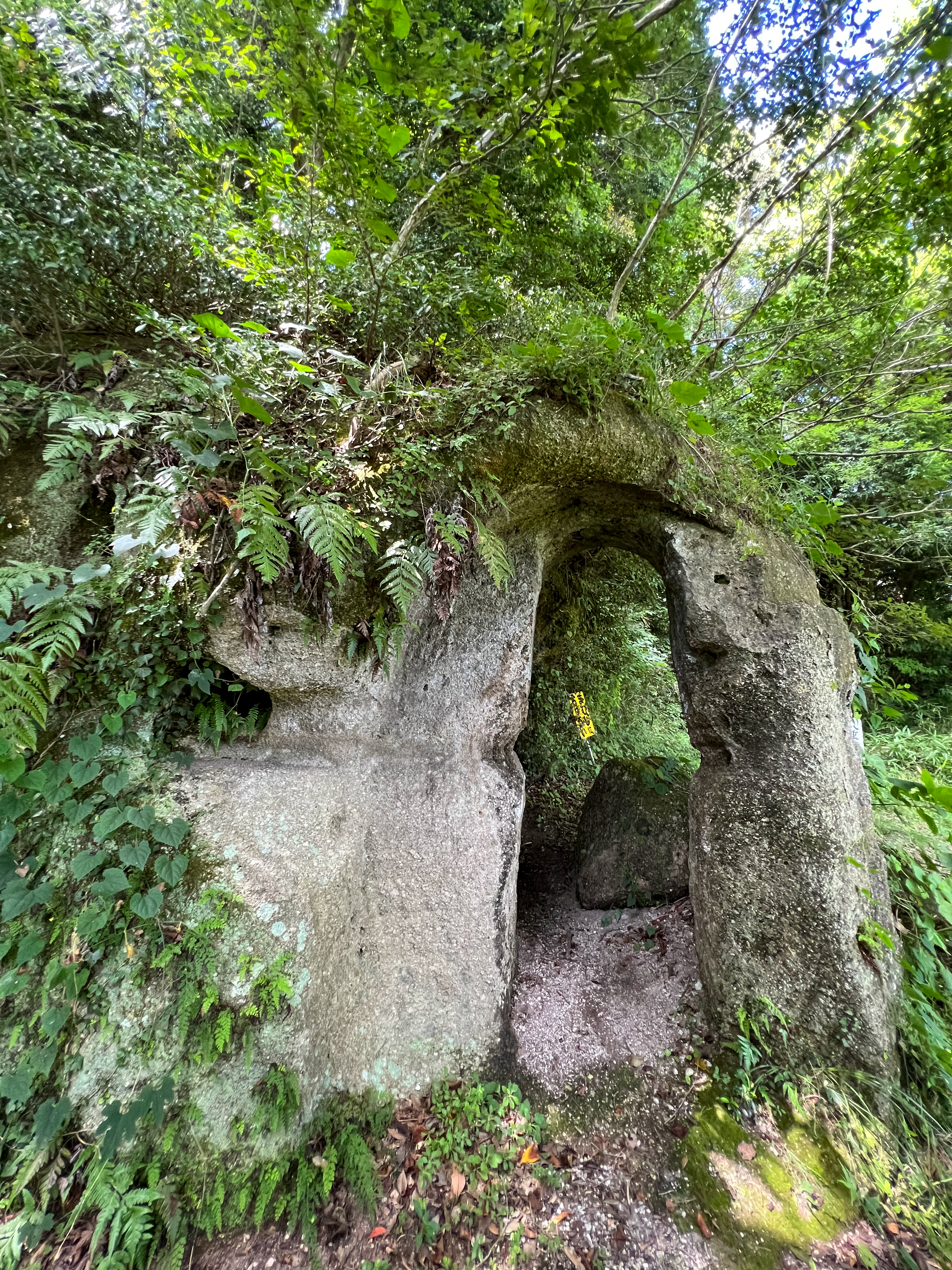
Tomb No.1

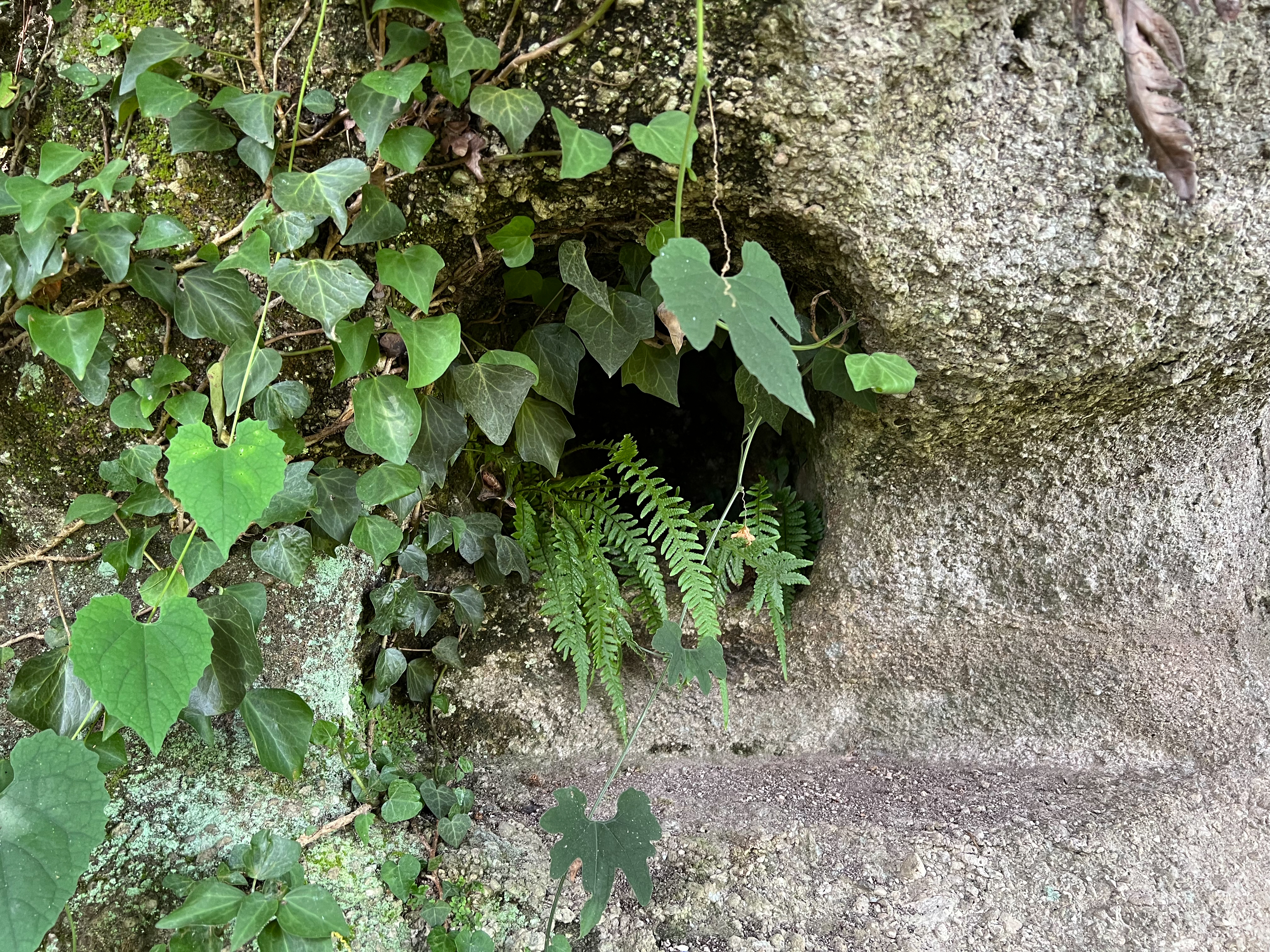
Tomb No.2

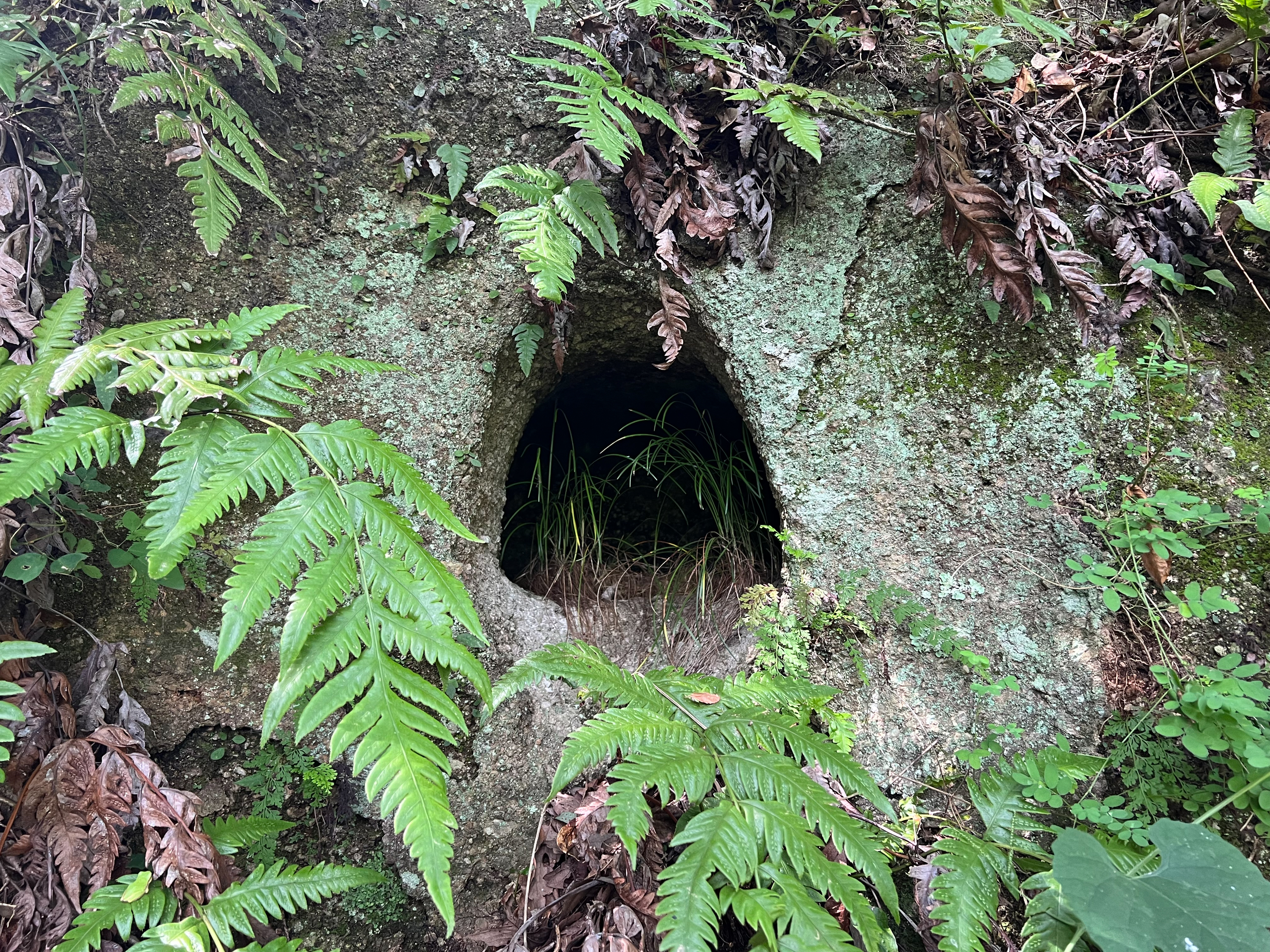
Tomb No.3

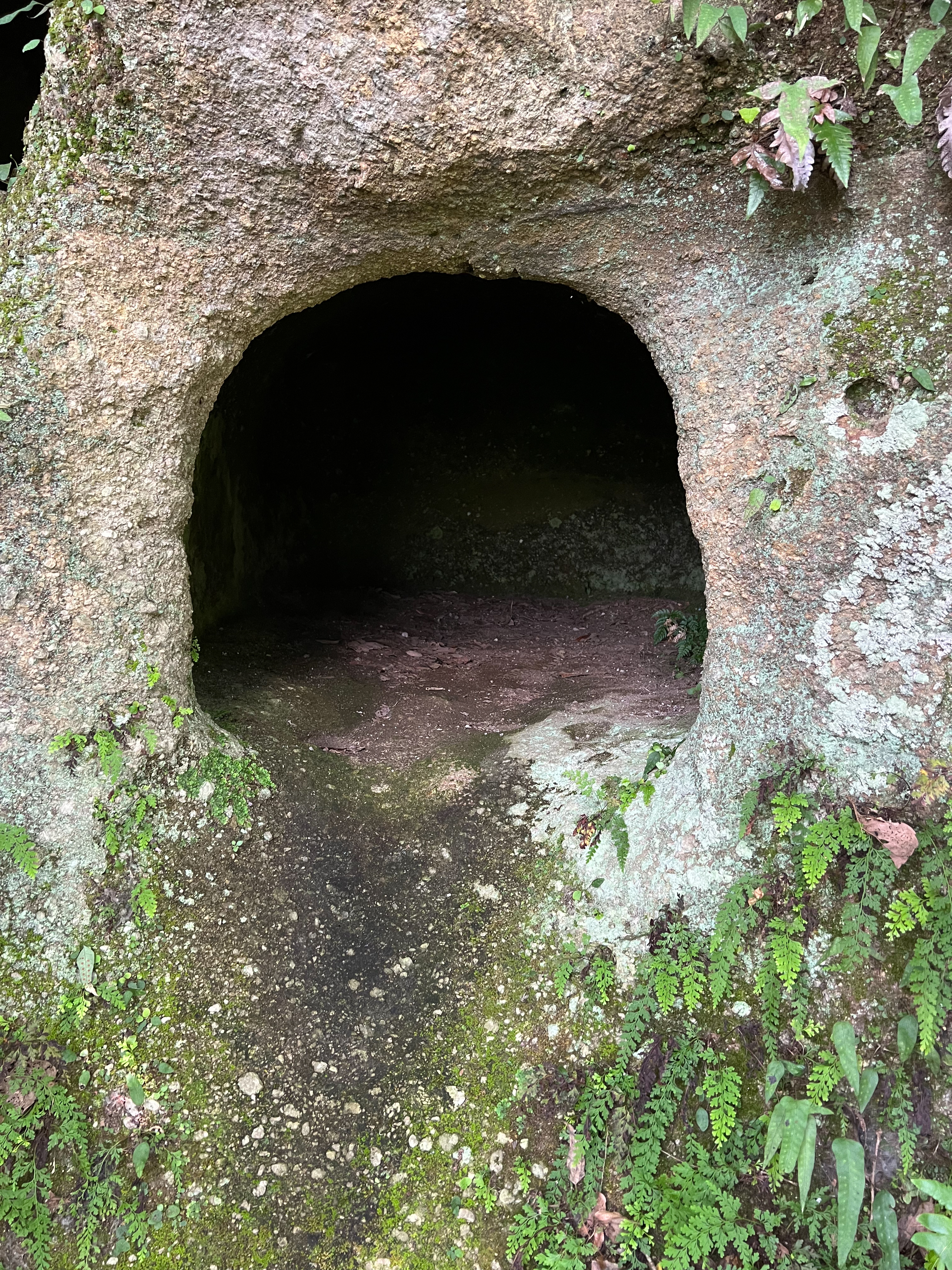
Tomb No.4

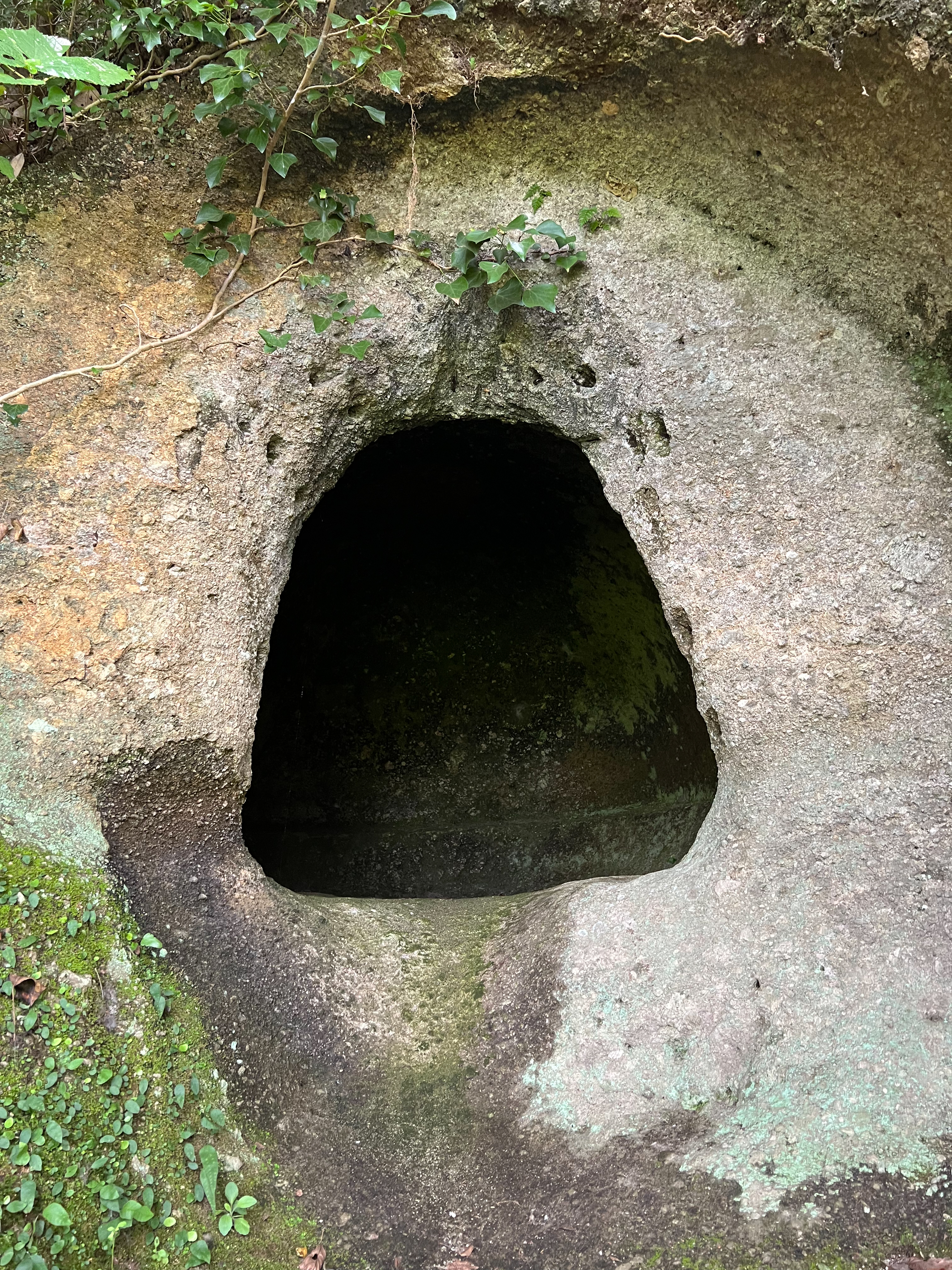
Tomb No.5

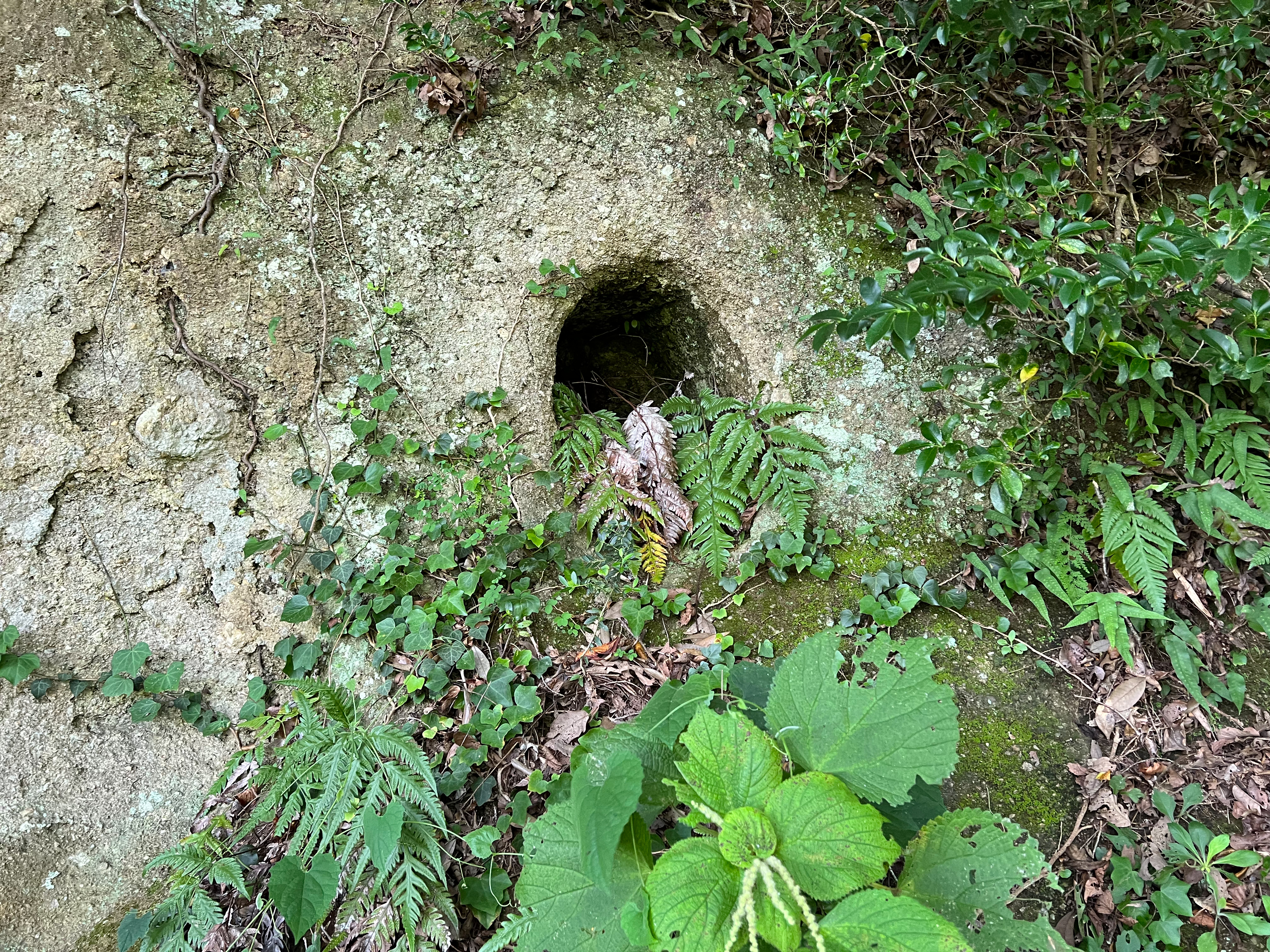
Tomb No.7

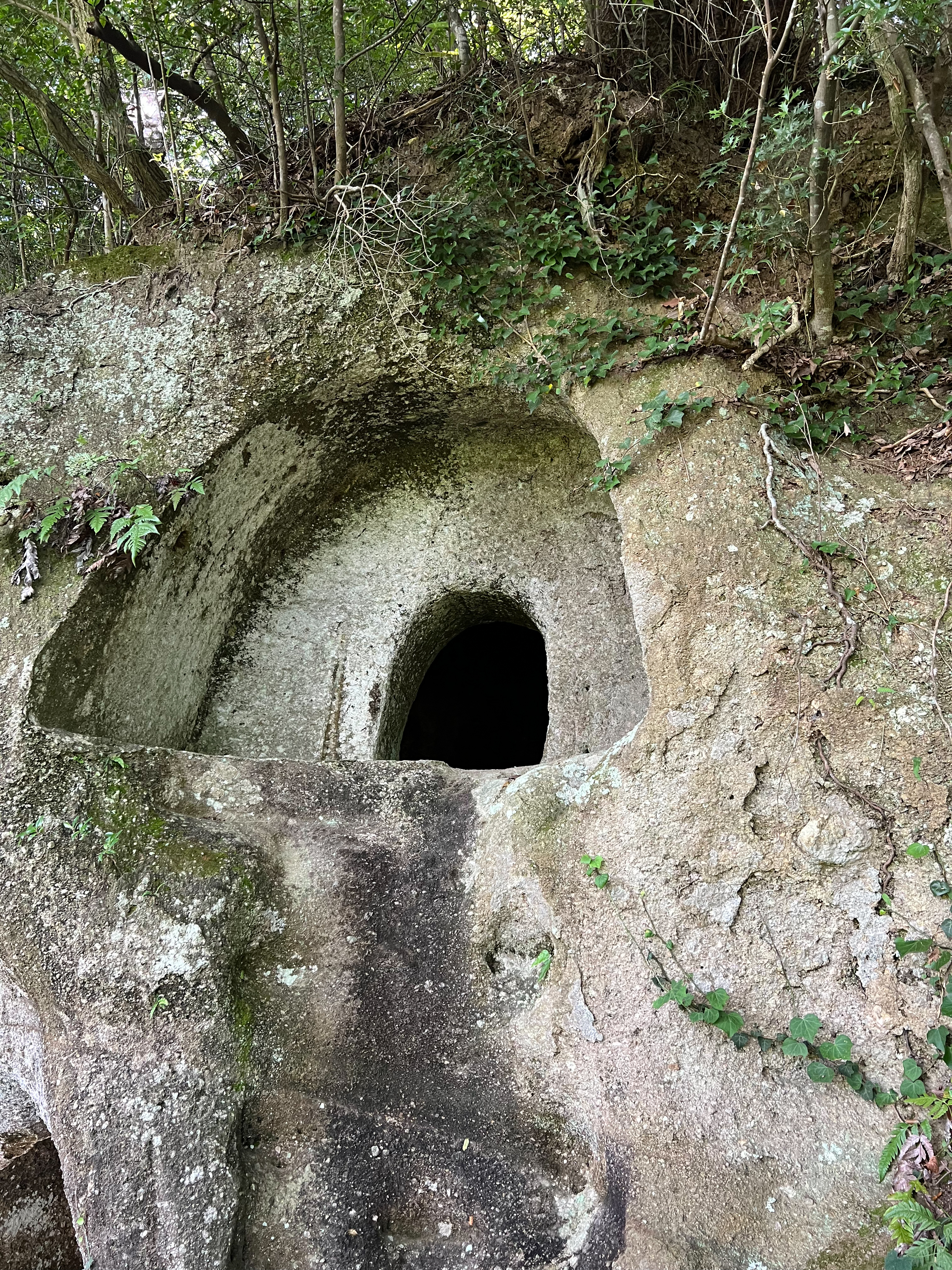
Tomb No.9

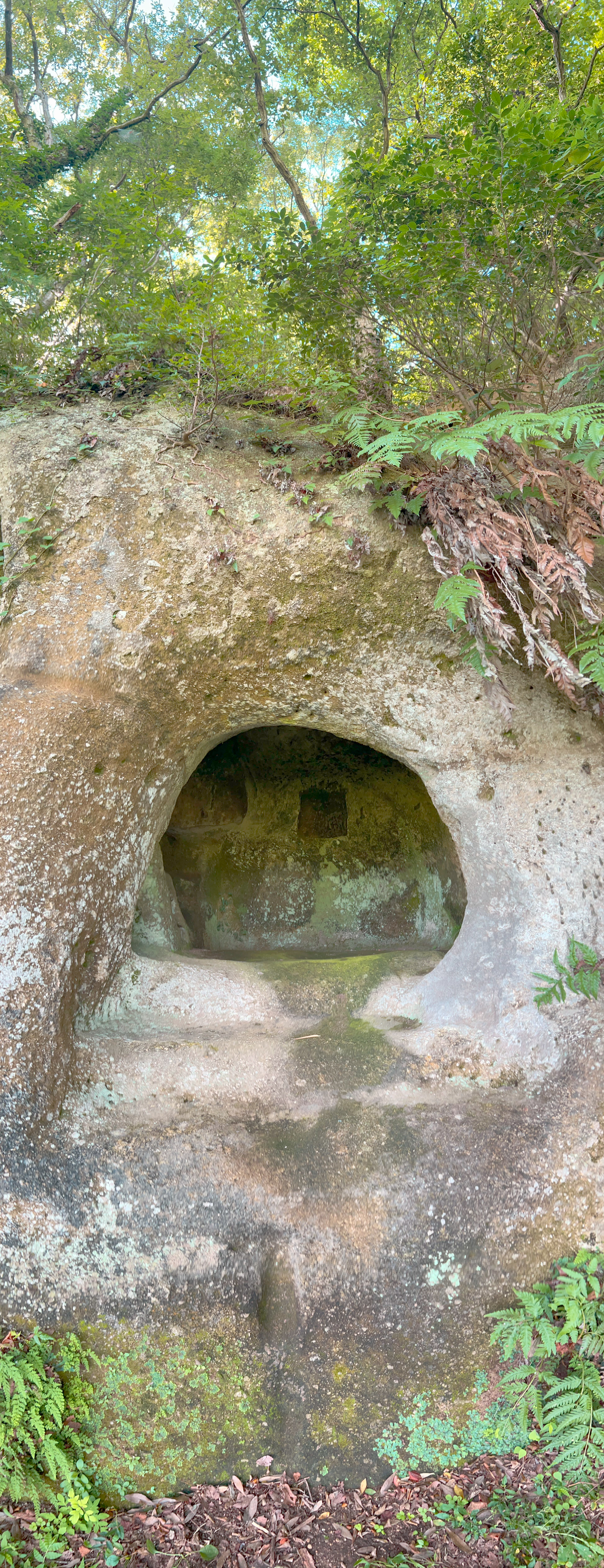
Tomb No.13

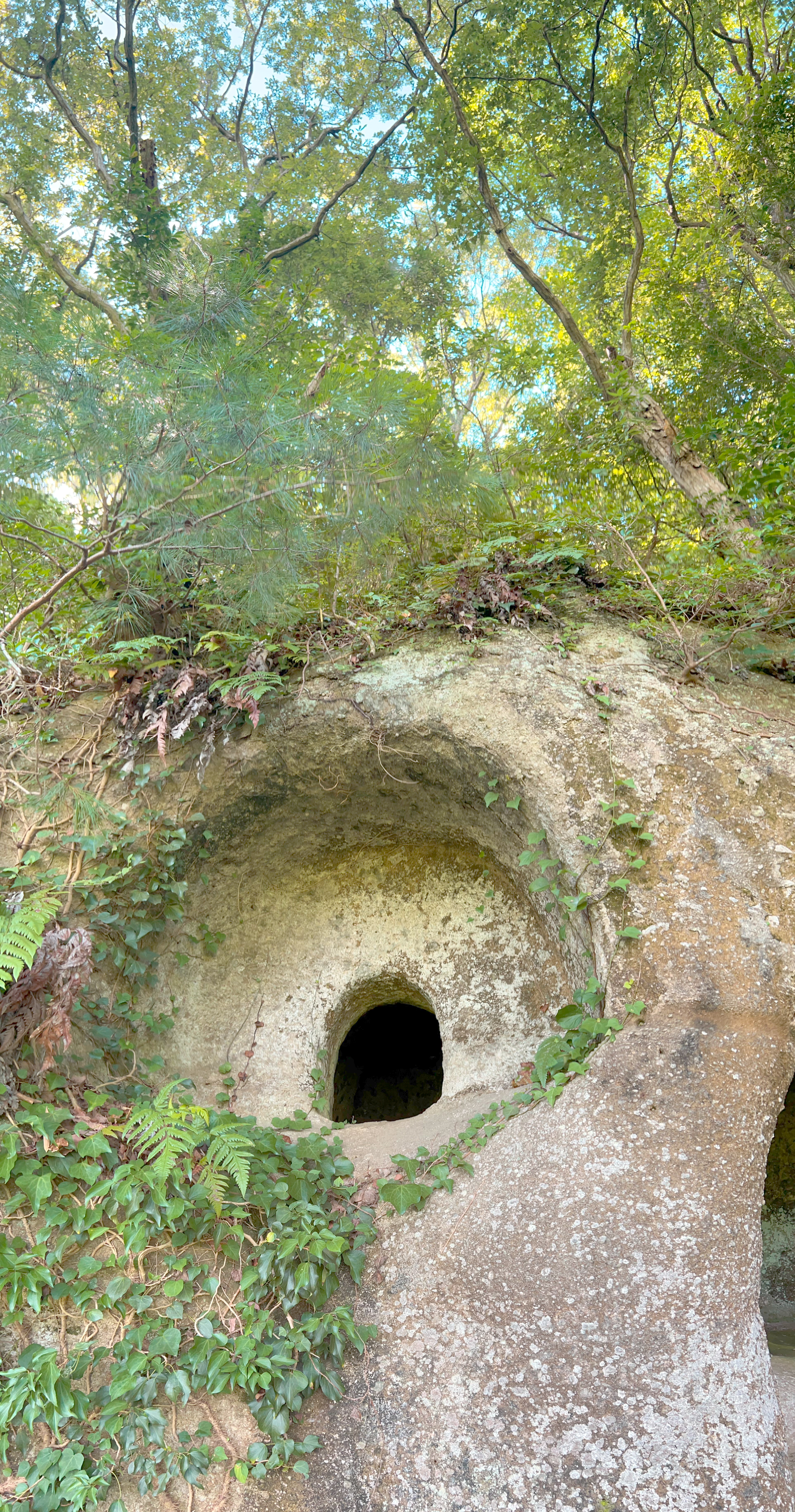
Tomb No.14

When 119 cave tombs were identified during the survey of the Sashibu custer from 1976 to 1980, in addition to the buried human bones, grave goods such as Sue ware pottery, magatama, and cut-glass beads were excavated.

The site is approximately 1.3 kilometers northeast of Nakane Station on the Hitachinaka Seaside Railway Minato Line.

== See also ==
- List of Historic Sites of Japan (Ibaraki)
