= Daiwatari Kanga ruins =

Archaeological site in Mito, Kantõ, Japan

- 台渡里官衙遺跡群 (Japanese)
- Daiwatari Kanga ruins Daiwatari Kanga ruins (Japan)
- 36°24′38″N 140°25′44″E
- Periods: Nara - Heian period
- Location: Mito, Ibaraki, Japan
- Region: Kantō region

Site notes
- Public access: Yes

The Daiwatari Kanga ruins (台渡里官衙遺跡群, Daiwatari kanga iseki-gun) is a group of archaeological sites with the ruins of a Nara to Heian period government administrative complex, associated Buddhist temple, and a warehouse complex located in what is now the Watari neighborhood of the city of Mito in Ibaraki prefecture in the northern Kantō region of Japan. The site has been protected as a National Historic Site from 2005.

== Overview ==
In the late Nara period, after the establishment of a centralized government under the Ritsuryō system, local rule over the provinces was standardized under a kokufu (provincial capital), and each province was divided into smaller administrative districts, known as (郡, gun, kōri), composed of 2–20 townships in 715 AD. Each of the units had an administrative complex built on a semi-standardized layout based on contemporary Chinese design.

The Daiwatari Kanga ruins are located on the edge of a plateau, at an elevation of 30 meters overlooking the Naka River. The ruins consist of three separate areas:

=== Daiwatari temple ruins (台渡里廃寺跡) ===
Intermittent excavation research from 1939 revealed two temple traces from the latter half of the 7th century to the beginning of the 10th century. The excavated relics consist of a large amount of roof tiles including eave tiles and edge tiles with inscriptions, and shards of earthenware. From these artifacts, and fragments of wood and charcoal, it is estimated that the temple was first built during the Hakuho era, but was destroyed by fire and rebuilt in the southern portion the site during the Heian period. The earlier temple grounds covered a rectangular area measuring 126 meters east-to-west and 156 meters north-to-south and contained the ruins of six buildings. It is not clear about the nature of each building, but it is presumed that the building with a tiled floor on the west side was the Lecture Hall, the building in the northeast was the Kondō and one of the other buildings was Pagoda and one in the east was the middle gate. The complex was surrounded by a cloister.

In the temple traces in the southern district, there are traces of the foundations of two towers and a large building which is assumed to be the temple's main hall. The grounds are 220 to 240 meters east-to-west by 210 meters north-to-south, with the building foundations dating from beginning of the 10th century. This area has also had traces of pit dwellings in the 8th and 9th centuries, and evidence of metal casting activities.

In addition to the large amount of roof tiles, tiles depicting Buddhist images, molds for statues, fragments of gold leaf and other Buddhist relics have been unearthed. Some of the tiles are inscribed "Tokurin-ji" and "Naka-ji", it can be inferred that the temple had two names, or were perhaps two separate temples. A Buddhist temple located outside the main enclosure was part of the standardized layout of a county-level administrative complex, and "Naka-ji" would imply that this temple complex is part of the county-level administrative complex for Naka County, which is known from historical records to have been an ancient political division of Hitachi Province.

=== Daiwatari Kanga site (台渡里官衙遺跡) ===
Located to the north of the temple ruins is the "Chojayama area", where the foundations of buildings which are believed to be the official warehouse complex for tax rice was discovered. A survey found traces of two large and small moats that divide these warehouse groups into two areas, and the entire warehouse group covered an area of about 300 meters east-to-west and about 200 meters north-to-south. The foundations of the granaries indicate that the buildings were all lined up in orderly rows. Although the ruins of the actual government administrative complex itself has not yet been discovered, the warehouse area was additionally designated as part of the National Historic Site in 2011, and it is expected that further excavation will eventually uncover the actual Kanga site and clarify the layout of these three sets of ruins.

The sites were backfilled after excavation, and aside from an explanatory placard, there is nothing to see at site. It is located about 15 minutes by car from Mito Station

== See also ==
- List of Historic Sites of Japan (Ibaraki)
