= Hirohata Shell Mound =

Archaeological site in Inashiki, Japan

Hirohata Shell Midden
- 広畑貝塚 (Japanese)
- Hirohata Shell Midden Hirohata Shell Mound (Japan)
- 35°58′43″N 140°23′07″E
- Type: shell midden
- Periods: Jōmon period
- Location: Inashiki, Ibaraki, Japan
- Region: Kantō region

Site notes
- Public access: Yes (no public facilities)

The Hirohata Shell Midden (広畑貝塚, Hirohata kaizuka) is an archaeological site in the Iide neighborhood of the city of Inashiki, Ibaraki Prefecture, in the northern Kantō region of Japan containing a late Jōmon period shell midden. The midden was designated a National Historic Site of Japan in 1982.

== Overview ==
During the early to middle Jōmon period (approximately 4000 to 2500 BC), sea levels were five to six meters higher than at present, and the ambient temperature was also 2 deg C higher. During this period, the northern Kantō region was inhabited by the Jōmon people, many of whom lived in coastal settlements. The middens associated with such settlements contain bone, botanical material, mollusc shells, sherds, lithics, and other artifacts and ecofacts associated with the now-vanished inhabitants, and these features, provide a useful source into the diets and habits of Jōmon society. Most of these middens are found along the Pacific coast of Japan.

The location of this shell midden is at the foot of a hill on the southwest coast of Lake Kasumigaura at an elevation of about 1.5 to 2 meters, The relic inclusion layer continues to the paddy field on the north side. Since the Meiji period, it has been famous as the place where many relics, including a number of perfectly preserved earthenware jars were found. These artifacts have been dated from the late Jōmon period and include clay figurines, Jōmon pottery, earrings and shell bracelets, stone tools, carved bones, and beads. In particular, a group of earthenware pots is very similar to the salt-making pottery found in later Kofun period sites, which indicates that the technology of salt production was already known in the Jōmon period. There are no public facilities at the site, which is located approximately 30 minutes by car from Shimōsa-Kōzaki Station on the JR East Narita Line.

== See also ==
- List of Historic Sites of Japan (Ibaraki)
