= List of historic sites of Japan (Ibaraki) =

This list is of the historic sites of Japan located within Ibaraki Prefecture.

== National Historic Sites ==
As of 29 February 2024, thirty-four Sites have been designated as being of national significance (including three *Special Historic Sites).

Site	Municipality	Comments	Image	Coordinates	Type	Ref.
*Former Kōdōkan 旧弘道館 kyū-Kōdōkan	Mito	Edo period han school	Former Kōdōkan	36°22′33″N 140°28′38″E	4	425
*Hitachi Kokubun-ji ruins 常陸国分寺跡 Hitachi Kokubun-ji ato	Ishioka	Nara period provincial temple of Hitachi Province		36°11′47″N 140°16′25″E	3	427
*Hitachi Kokubunni-ji ruins 常陸国分尼寺跡 Hitachi Kokubunniji ato	Ishioka	Nara period provincial nunnery of Hitachi Province	Hitachi Kokubunniji ruins	36°12′06″N 140°16′04″E	3	428
Atagoyama Kofun 愛宕山古墳 Atagoyama kofun	Mito	Kofun period tumulus	Atagoyama Kofun	36°23′47″N 140°27′06″E	1	434
Seki Castle ruins 関城跡 Seki-jō ato	Chikusei	Nanboku-cho period castle ruins	Seki Castle ruins	36°13′33″N 139°57′53″E	1	435
Yoshida Kofun 吉田古墳 Yoshida kofun	Mito	Kofun period tumulus	Yoshida Kofun	36°21′31″N 140°28′31″E	1	424
Konda Kanga ruins 金田官衙遺跡 Konda kanga iseki	Tsukuba	Nara period county government complex ruins		36°06′02″N 140°07′56″E	2	3429
Yūki temple ruins and Yūki Hachiman Tile Kiln Site 結城廃寺跡 附 結城八幡瓦窯跡 Yūki Haiji ato tsuketari Yūki Hachiman kawara gama ato	Yūki	Nara period temple ruins and kiln ruins		36°15′26″N 139°52′42″E	3	3335
Torazuka Kofun 虎塚古墳 Torazuka kofun	Hitachinaka	Kofun period decorated kofun	Torazuka Kofun	36°22′25″N 140°34′11″E	1	444
Hirohata Shell Mound 広畑貝塚 Hirohata kaizuka	Inashiki	Jōmon period shell midden & settlement trace		35°58′43″N 140°23′07″E	1	448
Sakura Azumao Former Residence 佐久良東雄旧宅 Sakura Azumao kyū-taku	Ishioka	Edo period kokugaku scholar residence	Sakura Azumao Former Residence	36°14′48″N 140°12′22″E	8	440
Kashima Jingū Precincts and Gūke Site 鹿島神宮境内 附 郡家跡 Kashima Jingū keidai tsuketari gūke ato	Kashima	major Shinto shrine complex	Kashima Jingū Precinct and Gūke Site	35°58′13″N 140°38′06″E	2, 3	449
Funazukayama Kofun 舟塚山古墳 Funazukayama kofun	Ishioka	Kofun period tumulus	Funazukayama Kofun	36°10′03″N 140°17′22″E	1	423
Oda Castle ruins 小田城跡 Oda-jō ato	Tsukuba	Nanboku-cho period castle ruins	Oda Castle ruins	36°09′05″N 140°06′39″E	2	438
Obata Kitayama Haniwa Production Site 小幡北山埴輪製作遺跡 Obata Kitayama haniwa seisaku iseki	Ibaraki	Kofun period kiln ruins	Obata Kitayama Haniwa Production Site	36°16′33″N 140°24′26″E	6	450
Kamitakatsu Shell Mound 上高津貝塚 Kamitakatsu kaizuka	Tsuchiura	Jōmon period shell midden & settlement trace	Kamitakatsu Shell Mound	36°04′37″N 140°09′58″E	1	446
Tokiwa Park 常磐公園 Tokiwa kōen	Mito	Edo period daimyo garden; also a Place of Scenic Beauty	Tokiwa Park	36°22′28″N 140°27′09″E	8	426
Hitachi Kokufu ruins 常陸国府跡 Hitachi kokufu ato	Ishioka	provincial capital of Hitachi Province	Hitachi Kokufu ruins	36°11′23″N 140°16′07″E	2	00003680
Niihari Gunga ruins 新治郡衙跡 Niihari Gunga ato	Chikusei	Nara period county government complex ruins	Niihari Gunga ruins	36°20′30″N 140°02′39″E	2	441
Niihari temple ruins and Uenohara Tile Kiln Site 新治廃寺跡 附 上野原瓦窯跡 Niihari Haiji ato tsuketari Uenohara kawara gama ato	Chikusei, Sakuragawa	Nara period temple ruins and kiln ruins		36°20′43″N 140°02′31″E	3, 6	439
Makabe Castle ruins 真壁城跡 Makabe-jō ato	Sakuragawa	Nanboku-cho period castle ruins	Makabe Castle ruins	36°16′29″N 140°06′34″E	2	451
Mito Tokugawa clan cemetery 水戸德川家墓所 Mito Tokugawa-ke bosho	Hitachiōta	Edo period daimyō cemetery at Zuiryu-san	Mito Tokugawa clan cemetery	36°34′22″N 140°31′46″E	7	00003539
Nishiyama Goten Site (Seizansō) 西山御殿跡（西山荘） Nishiyama goten ato (Seizansō)	Hitachiōta	also a Place of Scenic Beauty	Nishiyama Goten Site (Seizansō)	36°32′18″N 140°31′52″E	8	00003935
Daiwatari Kanga ruins 台渡里官衙遺跡群 Daiwatari kanga iseki-gun	Mito	Nara period county government complex ruins; designation comprises the sites Daiwatari Kanga and its associated Daiwatari Haiji (台渡里廃寺跡)		36°24′38″N 140°25′44″E	3	00003449
Ōgushi Shell Mound 大串貝塚 Ōgushi kaizuka	Mito	Jōmon period shell midden & settlement trace	Ōgushi Shell Mound	36°20′00″N 140°32′57″E	1	443
Daihō Castle ruins 大宝城跡 Daihō-jō ato	Chikusei, Shimotsuma	Nanboku-cho period castle ruins	Daihō Castle Site	36°12′12″N 139°58′21″E	2	436
Mawatari Haniwa Production Site 馬渡埴輪製作遺跡 Mawatari haniwa seisaku iseki	Hitachinaka	Kofun period kiln ruin	Mawatari Haniwa Production Site	36°24′08″N 140°33′41″E	1, 6	442
Hirasawa Kanga ruins 平沢官衙遺跡 Hirasawa kanga iseki	Tsukuba	Nara period county government complex ruins	Hirasawa Kanga ruins	36°10′41″N 140°06′12″E	2	447
Okadaira Shell Mound 陸平貝塚 Okadaira kaizuka	Miho	Jōmon period shell midden & settlement trace	Okadaira Shell Mound	36°01′02″N 140°20′57″E	1	3210
Kawaratsuka Kiln ruins 瓦塚窯跡 Kawaratsuka kama ato	Ishioka	Nara/Heian period kiln ruins	Kawaratsuka Kiln Site	36°11′27″N 140°17′14″E	6	00003990
Izumisakashita Site 泉坂下遺跡 Izumisakashita iseki	Hitachiōmiya	Yayoi period necropolis	Izumisakashita Site	36°32′33″N 140°24′39″E	1	00003991
Chōjayama Kanga ruins & Hitachi provincial road 長者山官衙遺跡及び常陸国海道跡 Chōjayama kanga iseki oyobi Hitachi-no-kuni kaidō ato	Hitachi	Nara period county government complex ruins		36°41′00″N 140°42′14″E	2, 6	00004038
Isohama Kofun Cluster 磯浜古墳群 Isohama kofun-gun	Ōarai	Kofun period tumuli	Isohama kofun cluster	36°19′00″N 140°34′18″E	1	00004091
Jūgorō Cave Tombs 十五郎穴横穴群; Jūgorō-ana yokoana-gun	Hitachinaka			36°22′24″N 140°34′17″E		

== Prefectural Historic Sites ==
As of 1 May 2023, fifty-seven Sites have been designated as being of prefectural importance.

Site	Municipality	Comments	Image	Coordinates	Type	Ref.
Naidaijin Taira no Shigemori Supposed Grave 伝内大臣平重盛墳墓 den-Naidaijin Taira no Shigemori funbo	Shirosato	in the grounds of Komatsu-ji (小松寺)		36°26′28″N 140°21′46″E		
Funadama Kofun 船玉古墳; Funadama kofun	Chikusei			36°16′23″N 139°54′33″E		
Koga Shogun Ashikaga Shigeuji Fortified Residence Site and Ashikaga Yoshiuji Grave Site 古河公方足利成氏館址・同足利義氏墓所; Koga Shogun kubō Ashikaga Shigeuji yakata ato dō Ashikaga Yoshiuji bosho	Koga			36°10′39″N 139°42′07″E		
Nandaisan Castle ruins 難台山城址; Nandaisan-jō shi	Kasama			36°18′11″N 140°13′28″E		
Honda Shigetsugu Grave 本多作左衛門重次墳墓; Honda Sakuzaemon Shigetsugu funbo	Toride			35°53′51″N 140°04′15″E		
Nakasai Castle ruins 那珂西城阯; Nakasai-jō shi	Shirosato			36°27′29″N 140°24′32″E		
Urizura Castle ruins 瓜連城阯; Urizura-jō shi	Naka			36°30′11″N 140°27′09″E		
Shizuku Castle ruins 志筑城阯; Shizuku-jō shi	Kasumigaura			36°11′33″N 140°14′04″E		
Abasaki Castle ruins 阿波崎城阯; Abasaki-jō shi	Inashiki			35°57′01″N 140°25′02″E		
Isa Castle ruins 伊佐城阯; Isa-jō shi	Chikusei			36°19′58″N 139°58′34″E		
Koma Castle ruins 駒城阯; Koma-jō shi	Shimotsuma			36°13′12″N 139°55′14″E		
Jingūji Castle ruins 神宮寺城阯; Jingūji-jō shi	Inashiki			35°57′23″N 140°22′07″E		
Yamagata Daini Grave 山県大弐の墓; Yamagata Daini no haka	Ishioka	in the grounds of Tainei-ji (泰寧寺)		36°12′59″N 140°12′57″E		
Hachimanzuka 八幡塚; Hachimanzuka	Tsukuba			36°12′23″N 140°04′48″E		
Kasahara Watercourse 笠原水道; Kasahara suidō	Mito			36°21′15″N 140°27′43″E		
Dainichiyama Kofun 大日山古墳; Dainichiyama kofun	Toride			35°55′31″N 140°03′03″E		
Fujiwara Fujifusa Site 藤原藤房卿遺跡; Fujiwara Fujifusa-kyō iseki	Tsuchiura			36°07′23″N 140°09′10″E		
Nareuma Castle ruins 馴馬城阯; Nareuma-jō shi	Ryūgasaki			35°55′00″N 140°10′27″E		
Jūgorō Cave Tombs 十五郎穴; Jūgorō-ana	Hitachinaka	34 from a larger group of 300 burials of the Kofun and Nara periods; excavated grave goods include Sue ware, swords, magatama, and beads; the name is derived from the local legend that Jūrō and Gōrō, the Soga Brothers from the Tales of Soga (曾我物語), sought refuge in the caves		36°22′24″N 140°34′17″E		
Kugeta Castle ruins 久下田城阯; Kugeta-jō shi	Chikusei			36°21′14″N 139°58′22″E		
Daiwatari Haiji Site 台渡里廃寺阯; Daiwatari Haiji ato	Mito			36°24′33″N 140°25′53″E		
Tsuchiura Castle ruins 土浦城跡及び櫓門; Tsuchiura-jō ato oyobi yagura-mon	Tsuchiura			36°05′06″N 140°11′53″E		
Maruyama Kofun 丸山古墳; Maruyama kofun	Ishioka			36°15′08″N 140°11′58″E		
Bontenyama Kofun Cluster 梵天山古墳群; Bontenyama kofun-gun	Hitachiōta			36°30′34″N 140°29′32″E		
Nagatsuka Takashi Birthplace 長塚節生家; Nagatsuka Takashi seika	Jōsō			36°08′01″N 139°56′19″E		
Hotokegahama 佛ヶ浜; Hotokegahama	Hitachi			36°37′26″N 140°40′34″E		
Mamiya Rinzō Birthplace 間宮林蔵生家; Mamiya Rinzō seika	Tsukubamirai			35°56′25″N 140°02′01″E		
Mamiya Rinzō Grave 間宮林蔵の墓; Mamiya Rinzō no haka	Tsukubamirai			35°56′31″N 140°01′48″E		
Yamadera Canal 山寺水道; Yamadera suidō	Hitachiōta			36°31′57″N 140°30′32″E		
Mizuno Tadakuni Grave 水野越前守忠邦の墓; Mizuno Echizen-no-kami Tadakuni no haka	Yūki			36°13′44″N 139°51′25″E		
Yūki Moat 結城御朱印堀（附地図2帖・証文1・由来帖1） Yūki goshuin bori (tsuketari chizu 2-chō・ shōmon 1・ yuraichō 1)	Yūki	designation includes plans and deeds relating to the tax-exempt area		36°18′21″N 139°52′18″E		
Gokakudō and its Western Clock 五角堂と和時計; Gokakudō to wa-dokei	Tsukuba			36°01′55″N 140°04′24″E		
Ishioka Ichirizuka 石岡の一里塚; Ishioka no ichirizuka	Ishioka			36°11′42″N 140°16′44″E		
Horinouchi Old Kiln Sites 堀の内古窯跡群; Horinouchi koyō ato gun	Sakuragawa			36°23′28″N 140°04′47″E		
Kumazawa Banzan Grave 熊沢蕃山の墓; Kumazawa Banzan no haka	Koga	in the grounds of Keien-ji (鮭延寺)		36°10′35″N 139°43′06″E		
Itaya Hazan Birthplace 板谷波山先生生家; Itaya Hazan sensei seika	Chikusei	Itaya Hazan Memorial Museum		36°18′41″N 139°58′48″E		
Noguchi Ujō Birthplace 野口雨情生家; Noguchi Ujō seika	Kitaibaraki			36°47′47″N 140°45′18″E		
Sukegawa Kaibō Castle ruins 助川海防城跡; Sukegawa Kaibō-jō ato	Hitachi			36°35′31″N 140°38′23″E		
Mito Castle Site 水戸城跡（塁及び濠） Mito-jō ato (rui oyobi hori)	Mito			36°22′30″N 140°28′44″E		
Izumigamori 泉ヶ森; Izumigamori	Hitachi			36°31′08″N 140°37′30″E		
Former Kuhara Headquarters 旧久原本部 kyū-Kuhara honbu	Hitachi			36°37′55″N 140°36′02″E		
Anayakushi Kofun 穴薬師古墳; Anayakushi kofun	Goka			36°07′40″N 139°43′36″E		
Shikamizuka Kofun 鹿見塚古墳; Shikamizuka kofun	Itako			35°59′48″N 140°33′21″E		
Fuchū Atagoyama Kofun 府中愛宕山古墳; Fuchū Atagoyama kofun	Ishioka			36°10′13″N 140°17′36″E		
Makabe Castle Burial Ground 真壁城主累代の墓地及び墓碑群; Makabe-jō shu-ruidai no bochi oyobi bohi-gun	Sakuragawa			36°16′08″N 140°06′47″E		
Ōu Kofun Cluster 大生古墳群; Ōu kofun-gun	Itako			35°59′58″N 140°32′43″E		
Taishi Kofun 太子古墳; Taishi kofun	Kasumigaura			36°06′52″N 140°20′53″E		
Chiyoda Ichirizuka 千代田の一里塚; Chiyoda no ichirizuka	Kasumigaura			36°10′14″N 140°15′03″E		
Kumano Kofun 熊野古墳; Kumano kofun	Kasumigaura			36°10′30″N 140°15′49″E		
Kosuke School Site 小菅郷校跡; Kosuke gōkō ato	Hitachiōta			36°41′59″N 140°30′36″E		
Minamikōya Shell Mound 南高野貝塚; Minamikōya kaizuka	Hitachi			36°29′59″N 140°36′11″E		
Sakasai Castle ruins 逆井城跡; Sakasai-jō ato	Bandō			36°08′33″N 139°51′11″E		
Tōjōji Sutra Mounds 東城寺経塚群; Tōjōji kyōtsuka-gun	Tsuchiura			36°09′45″N 140°08′57″E		
Nakaminato Reverberatory Furnace Site 那珂湊反射炉跡（附那珂湊反射炉資料25点） Nakaminato hansharo ato (tsuketari Nakaminato hansharo shiryō)	Hitachinaka	designation includes twenty-five related items		36°20′37″N 140°35′03″E		
Hoshi Jinja Kofun 星神社古墳; Hoshi Jinja kofun	Hitachiōta			36°30′42″N 140°29′01″E		
Fujimizu Shell Mound 富士見塚; Fujimizu kaizuka	Kasumigaura	designation comprises three shell mounds		36°06′21″N 140°22′07″E		
Ishigami Castle ruins 石神城跡; Ishigami-jō ato	Tōkai			36°28′59″N 140°34′41″E		

== Municipal Historic Sites ==
As of 1 May 2023, a further three hundred and eighty-nine Sites have been designated as being of municipal importance.

== Registered Historic Sites ==
As of 1 February 2024, one Monument has been registered (as opposed to designated) as an Historic Site at a national level.

Place	Municipality	Comments	Image	Coordinates	Type	Ref.
Okakura Tenshin Former Residence and Gardens with Ōizura-Koizura 岡倉天心旧宅・庭園及び大五浦・小五浦; Okakura Tenshin kyūtaku・teien oyobi Ōizura・Koizura	Kitaibaraki	also registered as a Place of Scenic Beauty; includes the site of the Rokkakudō		36°50′00″N 140°48′12″E		

== See also ==
- Cultural Properties of Japan
- Hitachi Province
- Ibaraki Prefectural Museum of History
- List of Places of Scenic Beauty of Japan (Ibaraki)
