= Obata Kitayama Haniwa Production Site =

- 小幡北山埴輪製作遺跡 (Japanese)
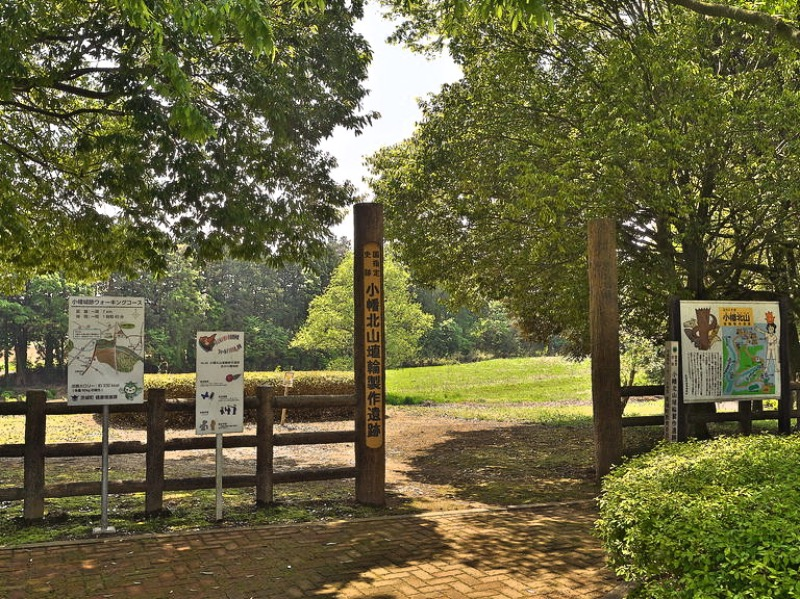
- Obata Kitayama Haniwa Production Site

- Obata Kitayama Haniwa Production Site Obata Kitayama Haniwa Production Site (Japan)
- 36°16′33″N 140°24′26″E
- Periods: Kofun period
- Location: Ibaraki, Ibaraki Japan
- Region: Kantō region

History
- Built: 6th century to the 7th century AD

Site notes
- Public access: Yes (public park)

The Obata Kitayama Haniwa Production Site (小幡北山埴輪製作遺跡, Obata Kitayama haniwa seisaku iseki) is an archaeological site with the ruins of a large-scale Kofun period factory for the production of haniwa clay funerary pottery, located in what is now the town of Ibaraki in Ibaraki Prefecture in the northern Kantō region of Japan. It received protection as a National Historic Site in 1992.

== Overview ==
The Obata Kitayama site is located on a plateau at an elevation of 22.5 to 27 meters, on the southern bank of the Hinuma River and is Japan's largest known haniwa production site. A large amount of haniwa were discovered when the land was cleared by farmers expanding their fields in 1958. In 1987 a new kiln site was discovered from a western side valley, so the remains were found over a much wider area than originally expected. Further archaeological excavations from 1987 to 1988 found that the area covered approximately eight hectares and included two clay mines, eight production locations, and 59 kilns. The haniwa recovered from this location were in a wide variety of styles, including cylindrical, "morning glory-shaped", shield-shaped, horse-shaped, as well as anthropomorphic in the form of a warrior, a figure blowing a whistle, a figure holding a vase, and other configurations. Haniwa made at this site have been recovered from a wide area around Ibaraki Prefecture, including the Funazukayama Kofun on the north coast of Lake Kasumigaura, 15 kilometers away.

The area has an effective natural environment for ceramics production, with high quality clay and abundant spring water and wood for fuel. The site is believed to have been in operation from the latter half of the 6th century to the 7th century AD.

The site is located a short distance from the "Akasaka Iriguchi" bus stop on the Kanto Railway Bus from Mito Station.

== See also ==
- List of Historic Sites of Japan (Ibaraki)
