= Seizansō =

Coordinates: 36°32′28.5″N 140°30′22.7″E

- 西山荘
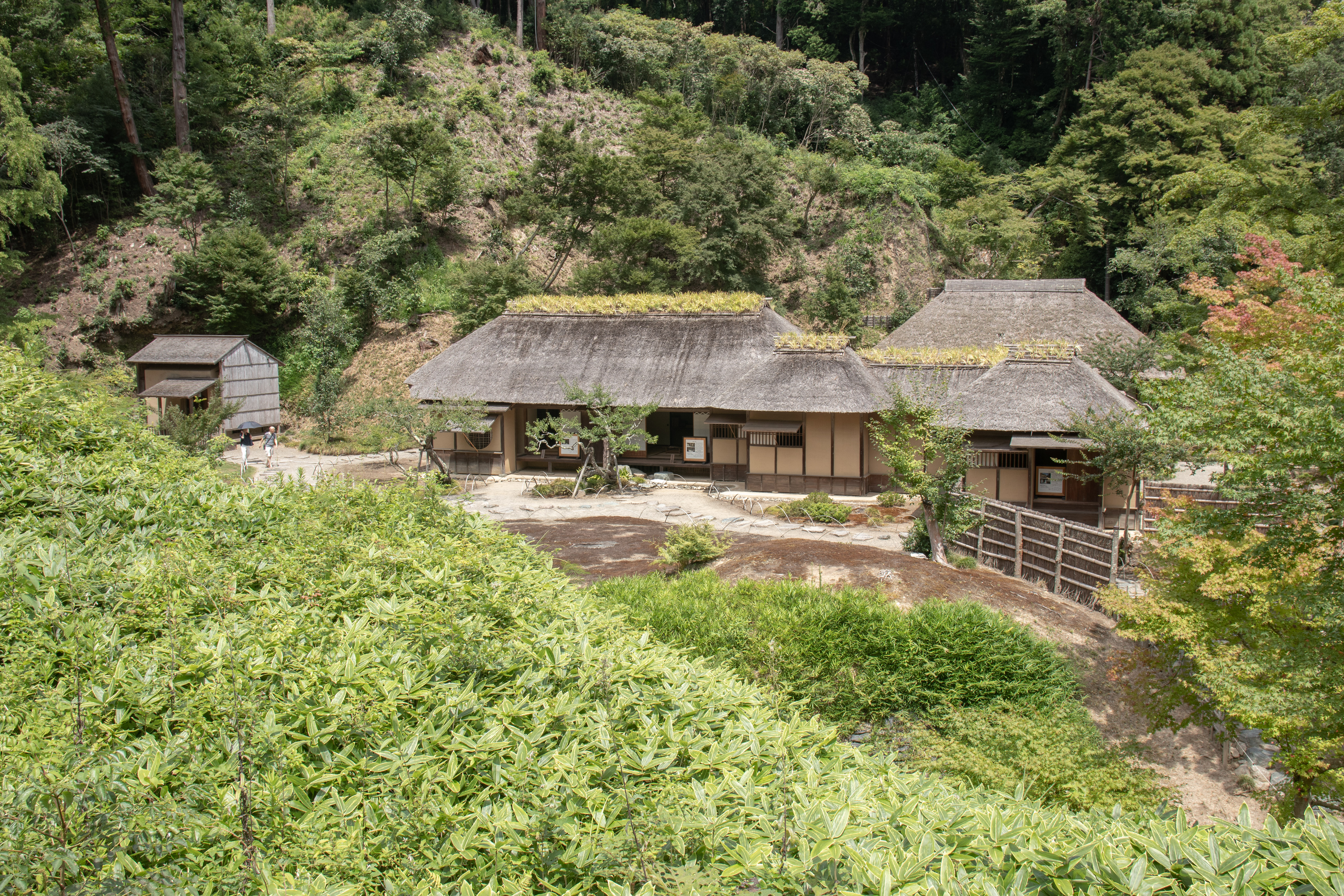
- Seizansō

- Location within Ibaraki Prefecture Location within Japan
- Alternative names: Nishiyama Goten (西山御殿)

General information
- Location: Hitachiōta, Ibaraki, Japan
- Estimated completion: 1690
- Renovated: 1819

Website
- Official website

The Seizansō (西山荘), also known as the Nishiyama Goten (西山御殿) was the retirement villa of Tokugawa Mitsukuni, the second daimyō of Mito Domain under the Edo Period Tokugawa shogunate of Japan. It is located in the city of Hitachiōta, Ibaraki. The villa was designated a National Historic Site and its gardens a National Place of Scenic Beauty in 2007.

== Overview ==
The Seizansō villa was constructed in 1690, and was the residence of Tokugawa Mitsukuni from 1691 unto his death in 1700. It was at this location that he gathered a number of history scholars from around Japan to compile the Dai Nihonshi, a history of Japan, which was not finished until 15 years after his death. The villa burned down in 1817, but was rebuilt in 1819 by the 8th daimyō of Mito Domain, Tokugawa Narinobu. Currently it is managed as part of the "Tokugawa Museum", a foundation controlled by the former Tokugawa clan, and is open to the public as a museum.

The building is a one-story structure with a thatch roof. The interior has rough walls, which reflects Tokugawa Mitsukuni's dislike for any form of ostentation. Outside the main structure is a smaller samurai residence for use by his guards and a Japanese garden.

== Gallery ==
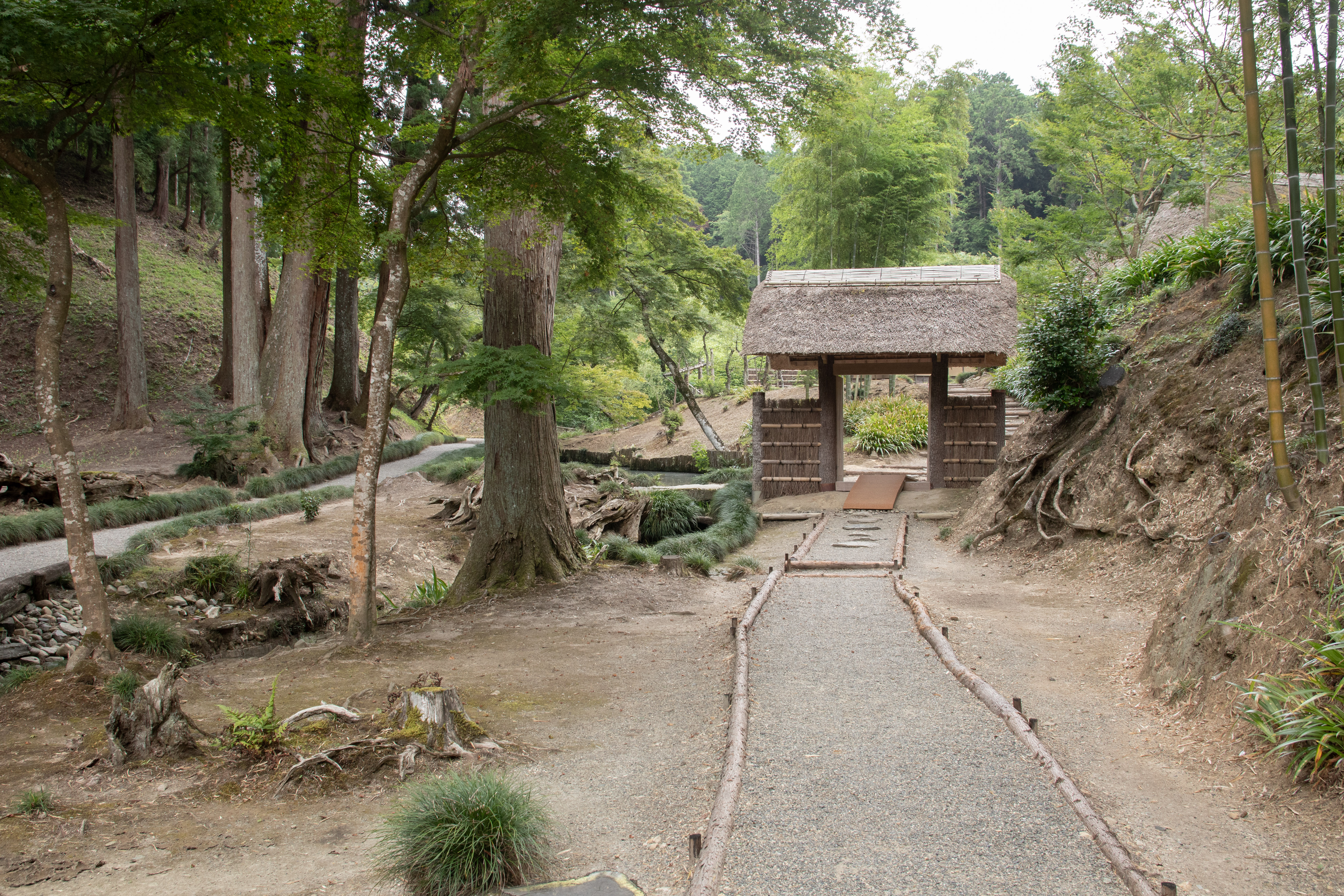
Entry

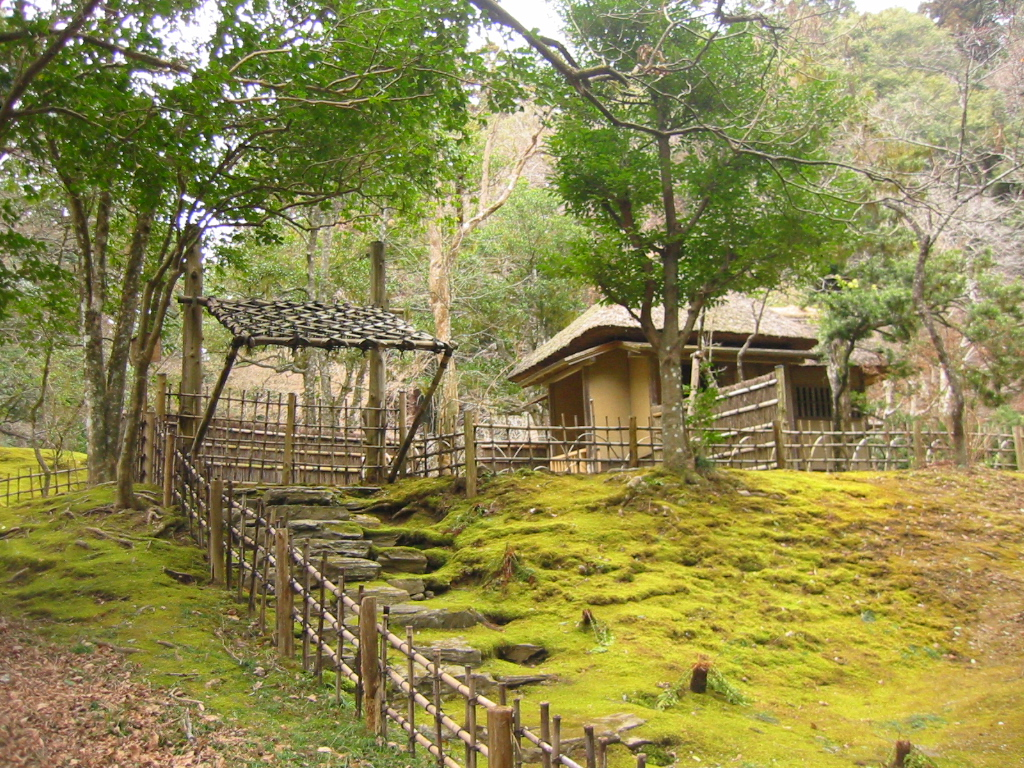
A portion of the gardens

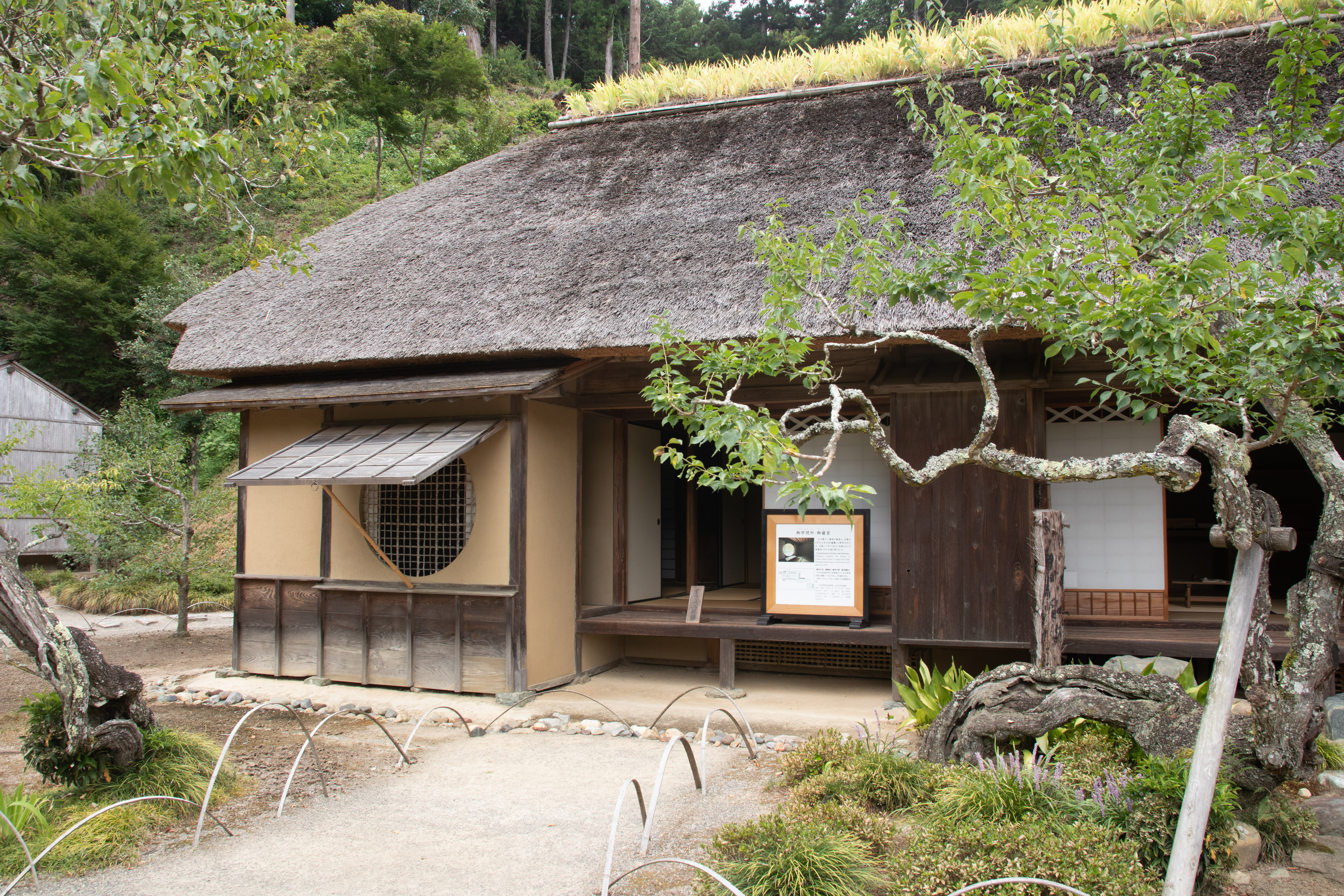
Nishiyama Goten Villa

== See also ==
- List of Historic Sites of Japan (Ibaraki)
