= Yoshida Kofun =

- 吉田古墳 (Japanese)
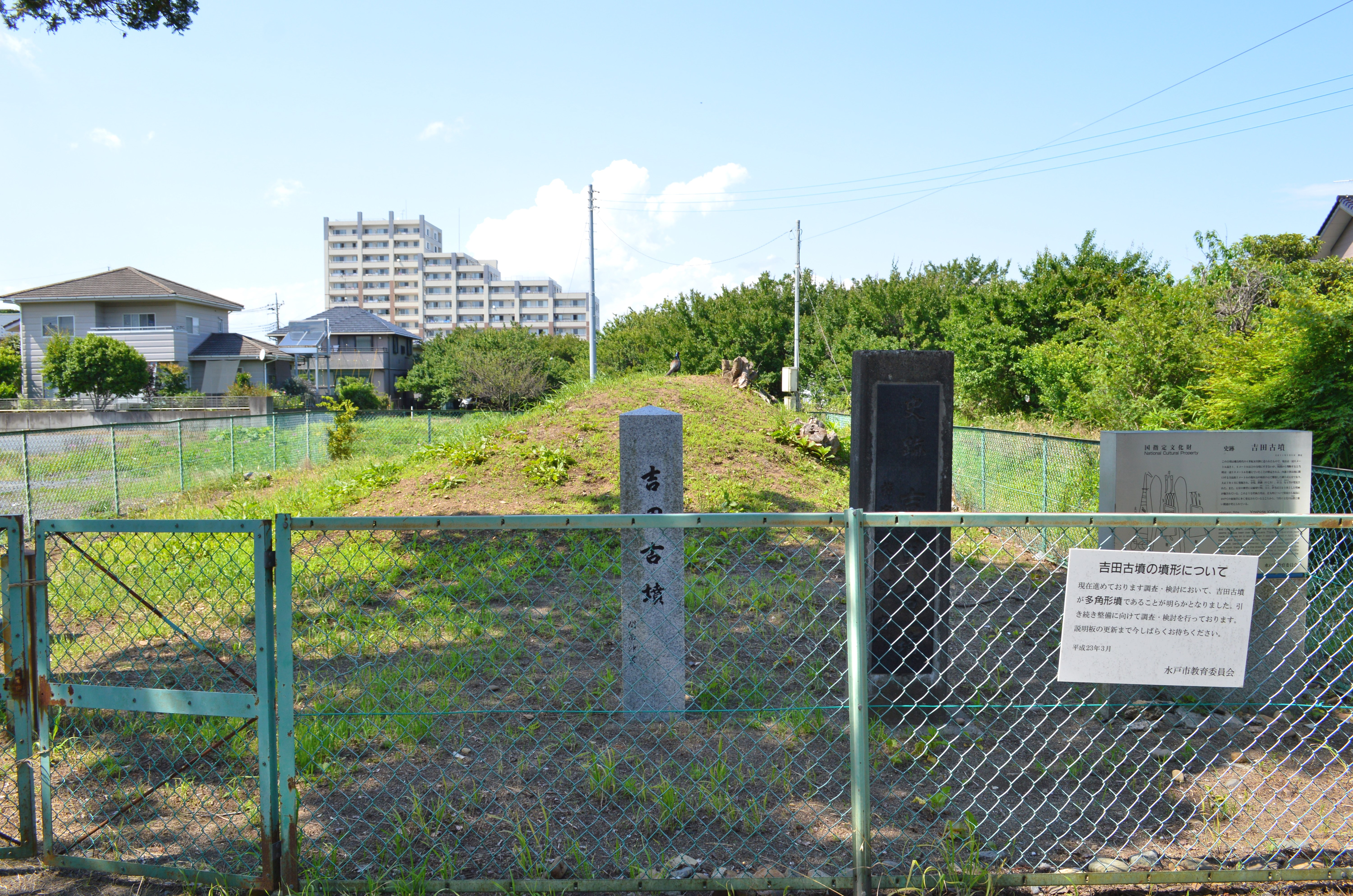
- Yoshida Kofun

- Yoshida Kofun Yoshida Kofun (Japan)
- 36°21′31.1″N 140°28′30.6″E
- Type: kofun
- Periods: Kofun period
- Location: Mito, Ibaraki, Japan
- Region: Kantō region

History
- Built: mid-7th century AD

Site notes
- Elevation: 10 m (33 ft)
- Area: 2,319.64 sq.m
- Excavation dates: 1914, 2006
- Public access: Yes (no facilities)

The Yoshida Kofun (吉田古墳) is kofun burial mound located in the Motoyoshida neighborhood of the city of Mito, Ibaraki in the northern Kantō region of Japan. The kofun was designated a National Historic Site in 1922, with the area under protection extended in 2010 and 2012

== Overview ==
The Yoshida Kofun was initially believed to be a square-type hōfun (方墳). The tumulus has a height of about 1.6 meters and is roughly of 26 meters on each side; however, per a survey conducted in 2006, it is now believed that the tumulus was a highly unusual octagonal-type hakkaku-fun (八角墳) instead. In 1914 an elementary school teacher attached to the Prefectural Mito Women's Normal School, demolished a part of the tumulus for soil, uncovering the burial chamber, which was found to be decorated with mural paintings depicting armor, swords, quivers, and spears. The burial chamber was three meters long and from 1.32 to 1.46 meters in width. Such decorated tombs have been found in the Kansai region and in Kyushu; however, this was the first such tumulus found in the Kantō region. Grave goods included gold rings, fragments of plate armor made of iron, straight swords, and magatama beads. Due to the rarity of decorated kofun, a number of noted archaeologists (including Torii Ryūzō) have researched the site over the years and have determined that it dates from the middle of the 7th century AD.

The tumulus is located a five minute walk from the "Yoshida Kofunen" bus stop on the Kanto Railway bus from Mito Station on the JR East Jōban Line.

== See also ==
- List of Historic Sites of Japan (Ibaraki)
