= Izumisakashita Site =

Izumisakashita site
- 泉坂下遺跡 (Japanese)
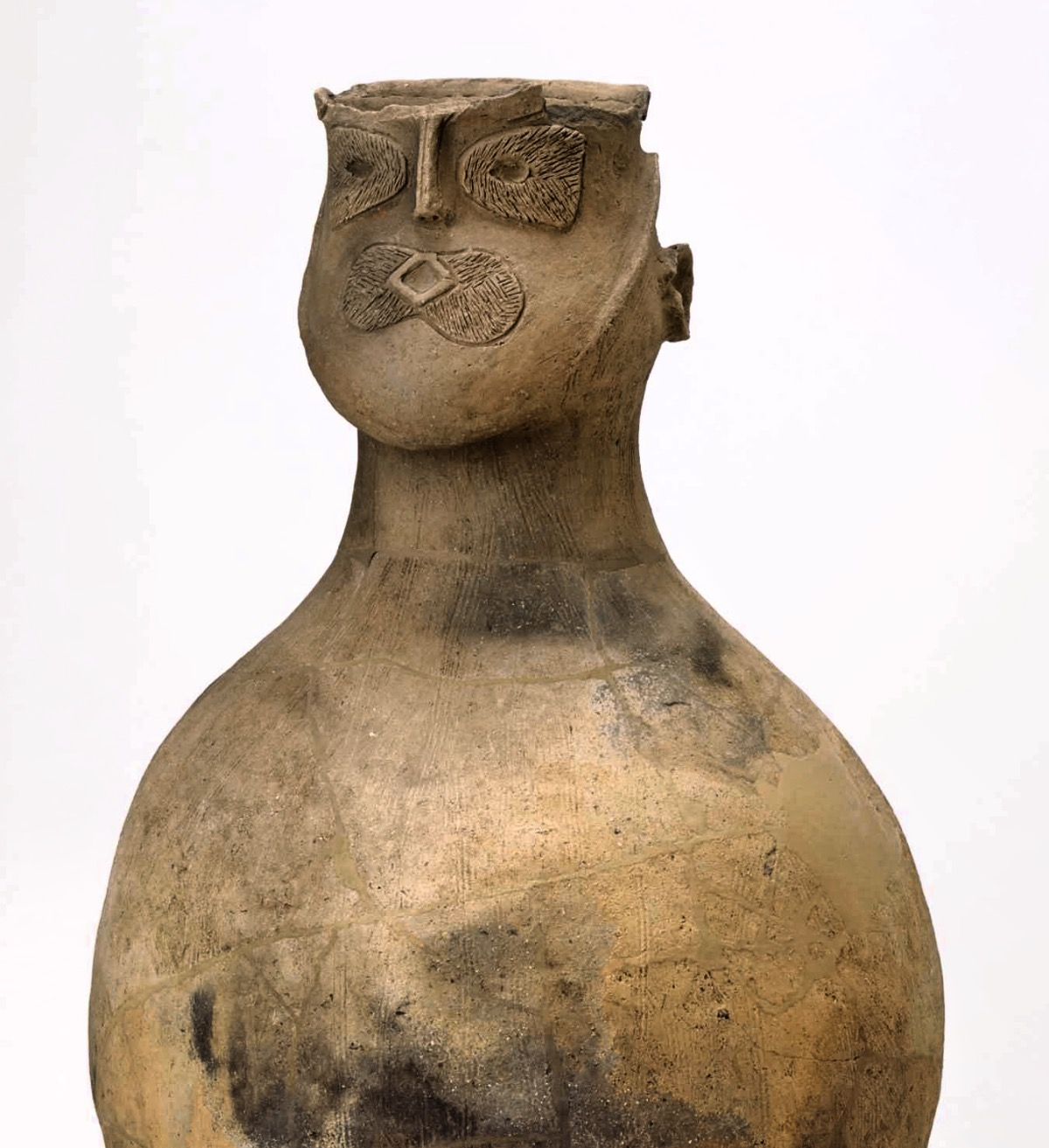
- Yayoi pottery from Izumisakashita site

- Izumisakashita site Izumisakashita Site (Japan)
- 36°32′00″N 140°26′04″E
- Type: kofun
- Periods: Yayoi period
- Location: Hitachiōmiya, Ibaraki, Japan
- Region: Kantō region

History
- Built: 2nd century BC to 2nd century AD

Site notes
- Elevation: 10 m (33 ft)
- Excavation dates: 1914, 2006
- Public access: Yes (no facilities)

The Izumisakashita site (泉坂下遺跡, Izumisakashita iseki) is an archaeological site with a Yayoi period necropolis, located in the Izumisakashita neighborhood of the city of Hitachiōmiya, Ibaraki in the northern Kantō region of Japan. The site dates from the 2nd century BC to 2nd century AD and was designated a National Historic Site in 2017.

== Overview ==
The Izumisakashita site is located about three kilometers northwest of the confluence of the Kuji River, which flows near the eastern end of the city, and its tributary Tamagawa, and is located on a low terrace on the right bank of the Kuji River, east of the Naka Plateau. The site is noted for the discovery of an imposing anthropomorphic pottery jar in an archaeological excavation conducted in 2006. The jar has a height of 77.7 cm and an opening of 14.0 cm, and is decorated with a human face in three-dimensions. It is among the largest of this type of earthenware yet found. Numerous other Yayoi pottery containers were also discovered. It is believed that these earthenware jars were burial urns used in association with the known Yayoi practice of secondary burial, in which the remains were exhumed and reburied after ceremonies after a certain period of time. Some 100 secondary burial sites have been identified in eastern Japan, of which this site is one of the best preserved, and the anthropomorphic pottery jar is one of only 17 known cases from this period.

Per an excavation conducted by the Hitachiōmiya City Board of Education since 2012, thirty grave sites were confirmed. These were divided into two groups, with 24 in the eastern group and six in the western group, along with at least 16 pit graves with no clay sarcophagus. All belong to the middle of the Yayoi period. It is believed that the pit graves were used for primary burials, and that the 30 graves, including the one with the anthropomorphic pottery jar, were used for secondary burial.

All of the relics were donated to Hitachiōmiya City, and the finds, including the anthropomorphic pottery jar, are designated as Important Cultural Properties of Japan. Some of the relics are on display at the permanent exhibition at the Hitachiōmiya Museum of History and Folklore (常陸大宮歴史と民族資料館, Hitachi ōmiyashi rekishi minzoku shiryōkan Ōmiya-kan). The site itself was backfilled after excavation and is now an empty field with no public facilities.

== See also ==
- List of Historic Sites of Japan (Ibaraki)
