= Atagoyama Kofun (Mito) =

Burial mound in Mito, Japan

- 愛宕山古墳 (Japanese)
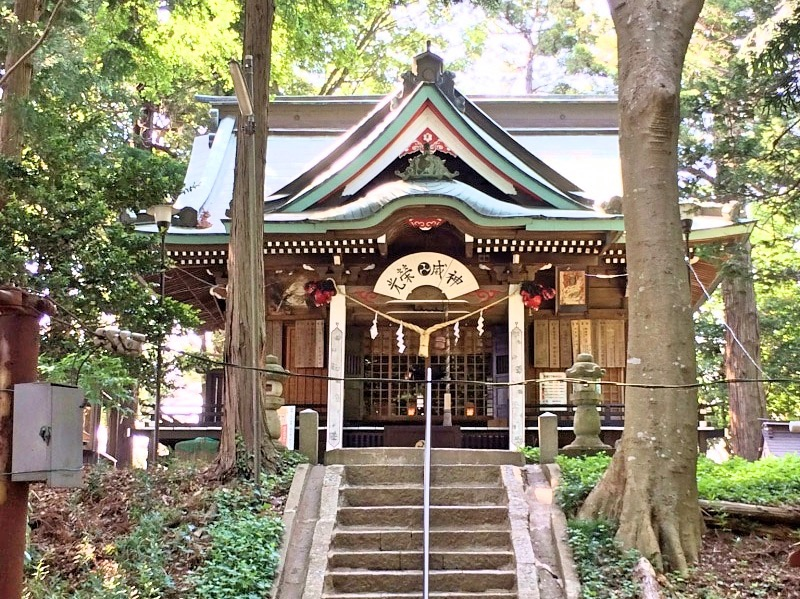
- Atago JInja, where the Atagoyama Kofun is located

- Atagoyama Kofun Atagoyama Kofun (Mito) (Japan)
- 36°23′47.04″N 140°27′5.95″E
- Type: kofun
- Periods: Kofun period
- Location: Mito, Ibaraki, Japan
- Region: Kantō region

History
- Built: early 6th century AD

Site notes
- Elevation: 40 m (130 ft)
- Area: 18,813 m^{2} (202,500 sq ft)
- Public access: Yes (no public facilities)

The Atagoyama Kofun (愛宕山古墳) is a kofun (burial mound) located in the Atago neighborhood of the city of Mito in Ibaraki Prefecture in the northern Kantō region of Japan. It received protection as a National Historic Site in 1934.

== Overview ==
The Atagoyama Kofun is located on a river terrace on the west bank of the Nakagawa River at an elevation of 40 meters. It is a zenpō-kōen-fun (前方後円墳), which is shaped like a keyhole, having one square end and one circular end, when viewed from above, and is one of the best-preserved keyhole-shaped kofun in eastern Japan. It is also one the largest found in Ibaraki Prefecture.

The tumulus has a total length of 136.5 meters with an orientation of northwest to southeast and was surrounded by a moat with a width of 23 meters. The tumulus is well-preserved, but the moat has mostly been filled in and is occupied by private residences. The kofun is named for a Shinto Shrine, and Atago Shrine located at its summit.

The interior of the tomb has not been excavated, but fragments of Sue ware pottery have been found in the vicinity in 1978 survey. Large cylindrical haniwa were found on the ridges and skirts of the posterior part of the posterior dome, so it is estimated that there were originally 3 to 4 rows of haniwa. From the style of the haniwa it is believed to have been built in the early 6th century as the tomb of Takekashima-no-mikoto, the Kuni no miyatsuko of the "Nakanokuni", whose territories existed on either side of the Naka River.

The tumulus is one of a cluster of kofun in the vicinity, which were not accorded protected status. The tumulus is a five-minute walk from the "Hakamatsuka 2-chome” bus stop on the Ibaraki Kotsu Bus from Mito Station.

Total length
136.5 meters
Anterior rectangular portion
73 meters wide x 9 meters high
Posterior circular portion
78 meter diameter x 10 meters high

== See also ==
- List of Historic Sites of Japan (Ibaraki)
