= Isohama Kofun Cluster =

- 磯浜古墳群 (Japanese)
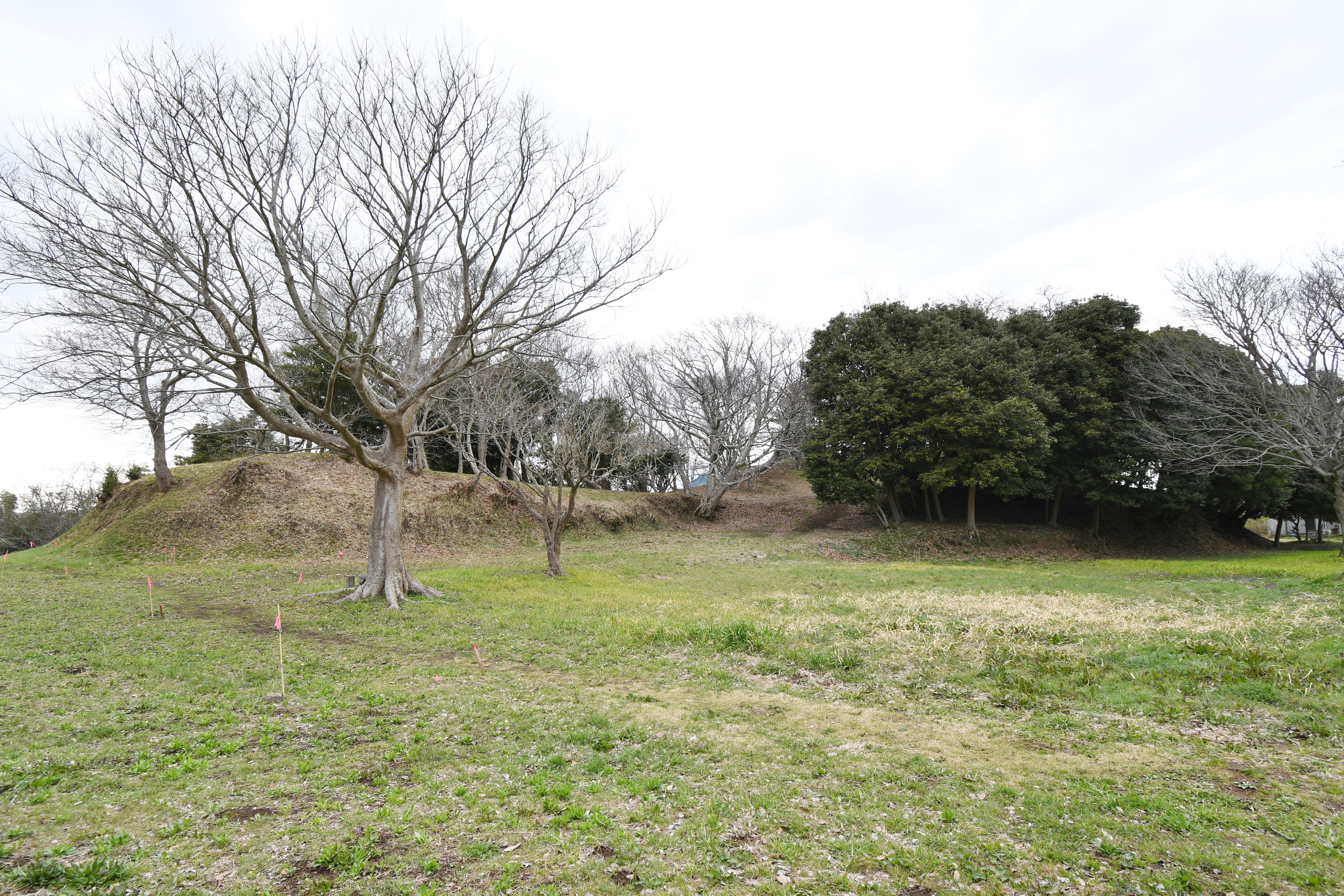
- Hisagezuka Kofun

- Isohama Kofun-gun Isohama Kofun Cluster (Japan)
- Interactive map of Isohama Kofun Cluster
- 36°18′57.60″N 140°34′13.33″E
- Type: kofun
- Periods: Kofun period
- Location: Ōarai, Ibaraki, Japan
- Region: Kantō region

History
- Built: 3rd - 4th century AD

Site notes
- Elevation: 10 m (33 ft)
- Excavation dates: 1949, 2011-2021, 2019-2020
- Public access: Yes (no facilities)

The Isohama Kofun Cluster (磯浜古墳群, Isohama Kofun-gun) is a group of ancient Kofun period burial mounds, located in what is now part of the town of Ōarai, Ibaraki in the northern Kantō region of Japan. Three of the tumuli at this site were designated a National Historic Site in 2020 and three more are under consideration.

== Overview ==
The Isohama Kofun Cluster is located in the central part of Ibaraki prefecture, facing the Pacific Ocean, about three kilometers southwest of the mouth of the Naka River. The site is located on a hill and consists of two zenpō-kōen-fun (前方後円墳), which are shaped like a keyhole, having one square end and one circular end, when viewed from above, one "two-conjoined rectangles" type kofun (zenpō-kōhō-fun (前方後方墳)), two circular-type kofun (empun (円墳)) and two of indeterminate shape. The site once contained many more tumuli, most of which were destroyed due to land development and urban encroachment.

The keyhole-shaped tumuli have been excavated, and over 4100 grave goods were recovered, including two bronze mirrors, iron swords, jade magatama, and jasper tubes, balls and other jewelry, and facsimiles of everyday objects. A number of human remains were also found. The Hisagezuka Kofun, with a total length of 101.4 meters is one of the largest in Ibaraki Prefecture. The posterior circular portion is 65 meters in diameter and numerous haniwa have been recovered.

Likewise, the Kurumazuka Kofun, with a diameter of 88 meters is one of the largest circular-type kofun in Japan. From they grave goods and construction techniques, it is estimated that these tumuli were built from the mid-3rd century to late 4th century.

The surrounding Higekama Ipponmatsu site is a large-scale settlement trace that had continued from the Yayoi period into the Kofun period, so it can be assumed that this necropolis is for the local kings of this region. Its location overlooking the ocean and the mouth of the Naka River also hints at the possibility that these local kings had some maritime connection to the Yamato region of western Japan. The Ōarai Isozaki Shrine is a Shinto shrine located nearby and is dedicated to the Nakakunizo clan, which may also have a connection to these tumuli.

The site is a 12-minute walk from Ōarai Station.

Isohama Kofun Cluster
	Name	Location	Type	Size	Date	Status
1	Himezuka Kofun 姫塚古墳	36°19′4.55″N 140°34′15.95″E	co-joined rectangles	29 m length	mid-3rd C	National H.S.
2	Gohonmatsu Kofun 五本松古墳	36°19′3.6″N 140°34′10.8″E	indeterminate	-	late-3rd to early 4th	
3	Gohonmatsushita Kofun 五本松下古墳	36°19′4.8″N 140°34′12.9″E	indeterminate	-	late-3rd to early 4th	
4	Bochiyama Kofun 坊主山古墳	36°19′1.57″N 140°34′19.48″E	Keyhole	63 m length	early 4th C	
5	Hisagezuka Kofun 日下ヶ塚古墳	36°18′57.60″N 140°34′13.33″E	Keyhole	101.4 m length	mid-4th C	National H.S.
6	Kurumazuka Kofun 車塚古墳	36°19′2.55″N 140°34′34.70″E	Dome	88 m length	late-4th C	National H.S.

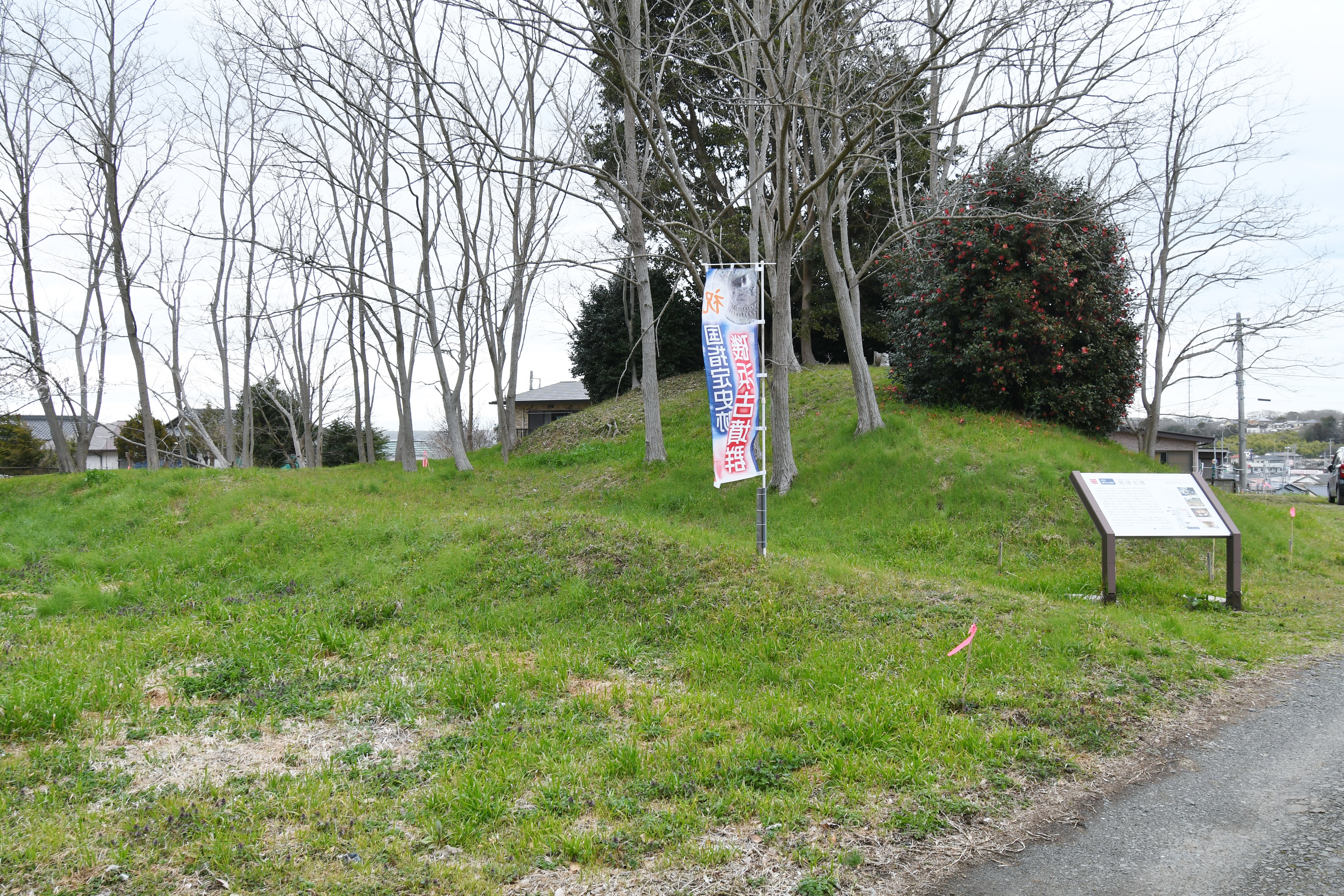
Himezuka Kofun

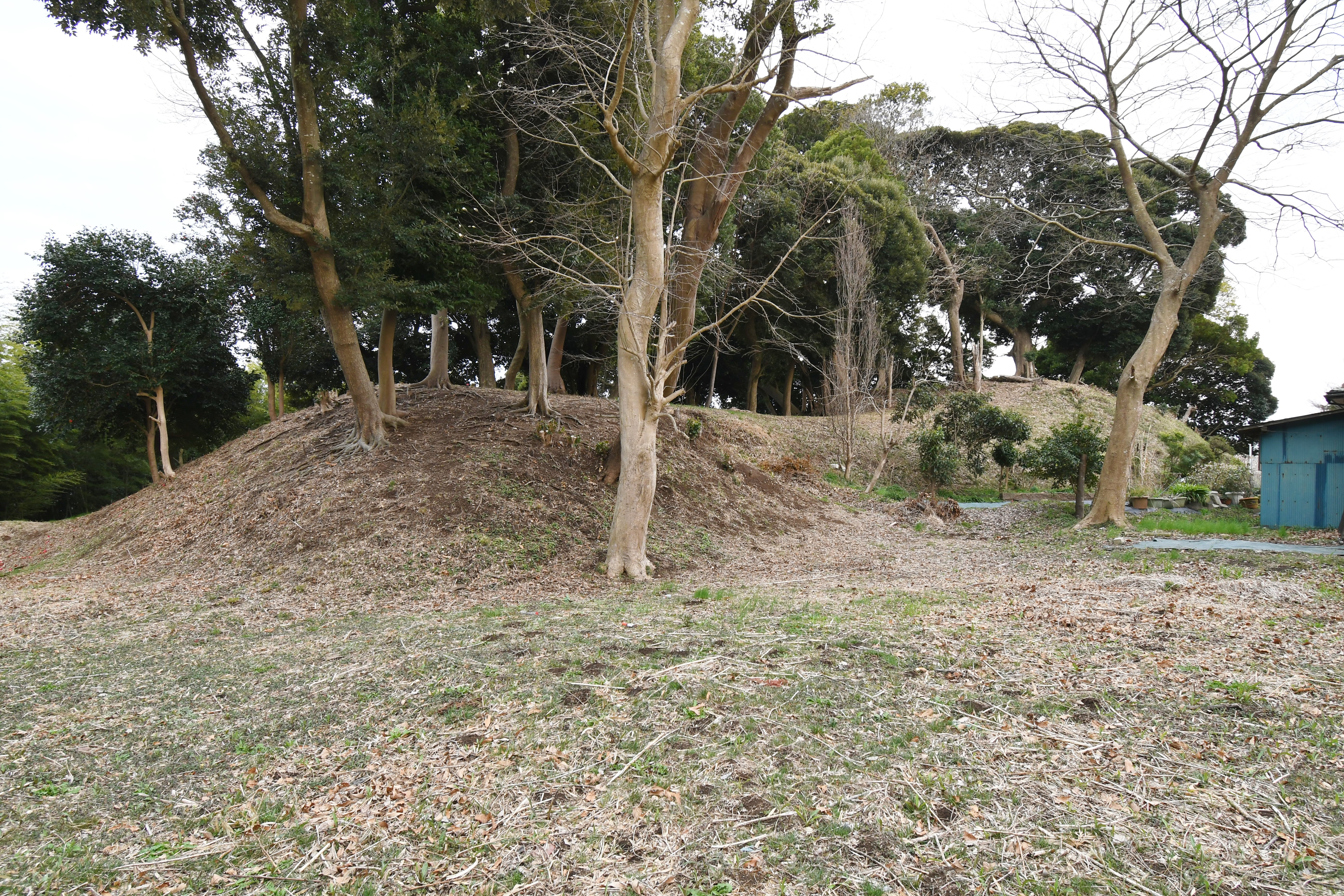
Bochiyama Kofun

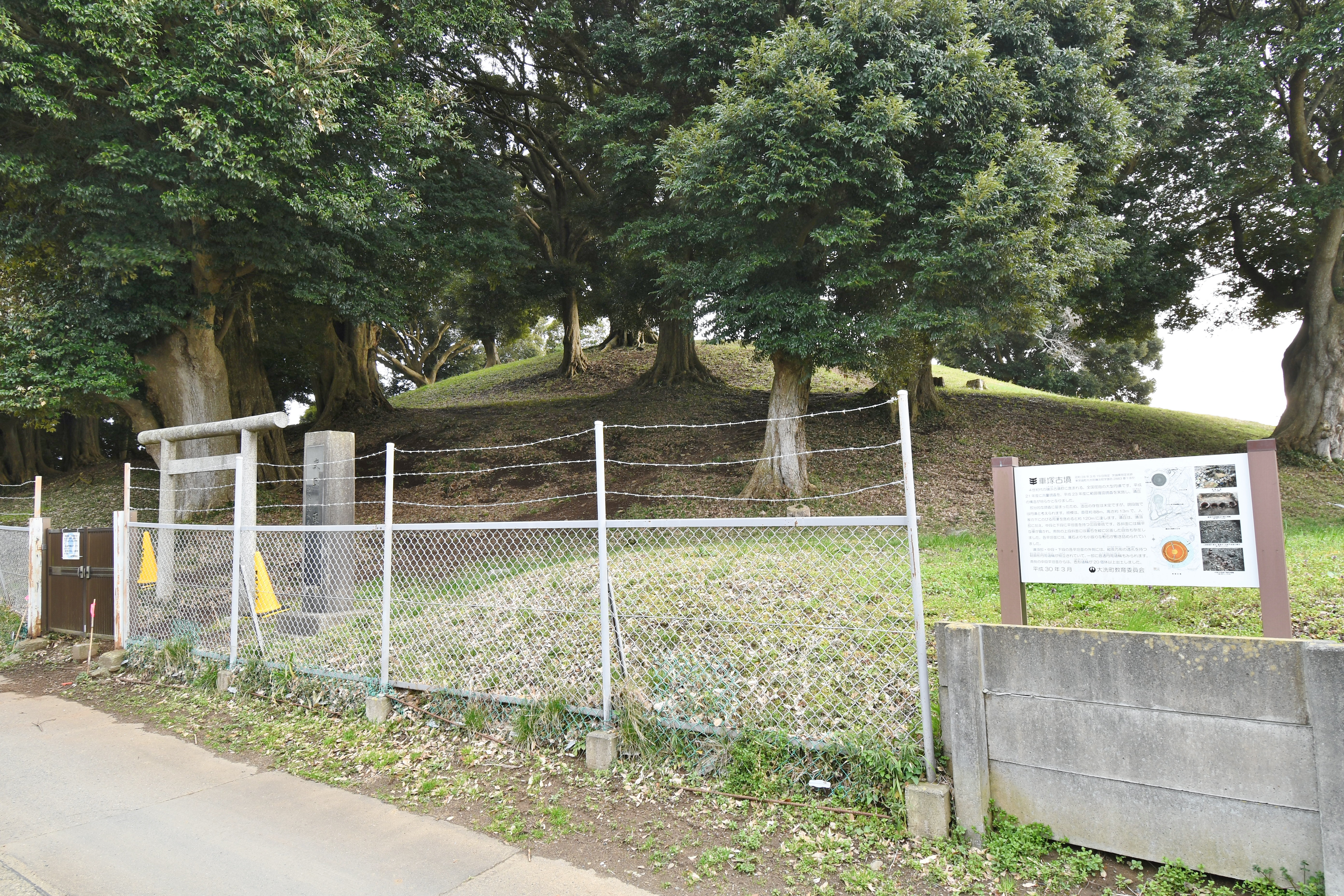
Kurumazuka Kofun

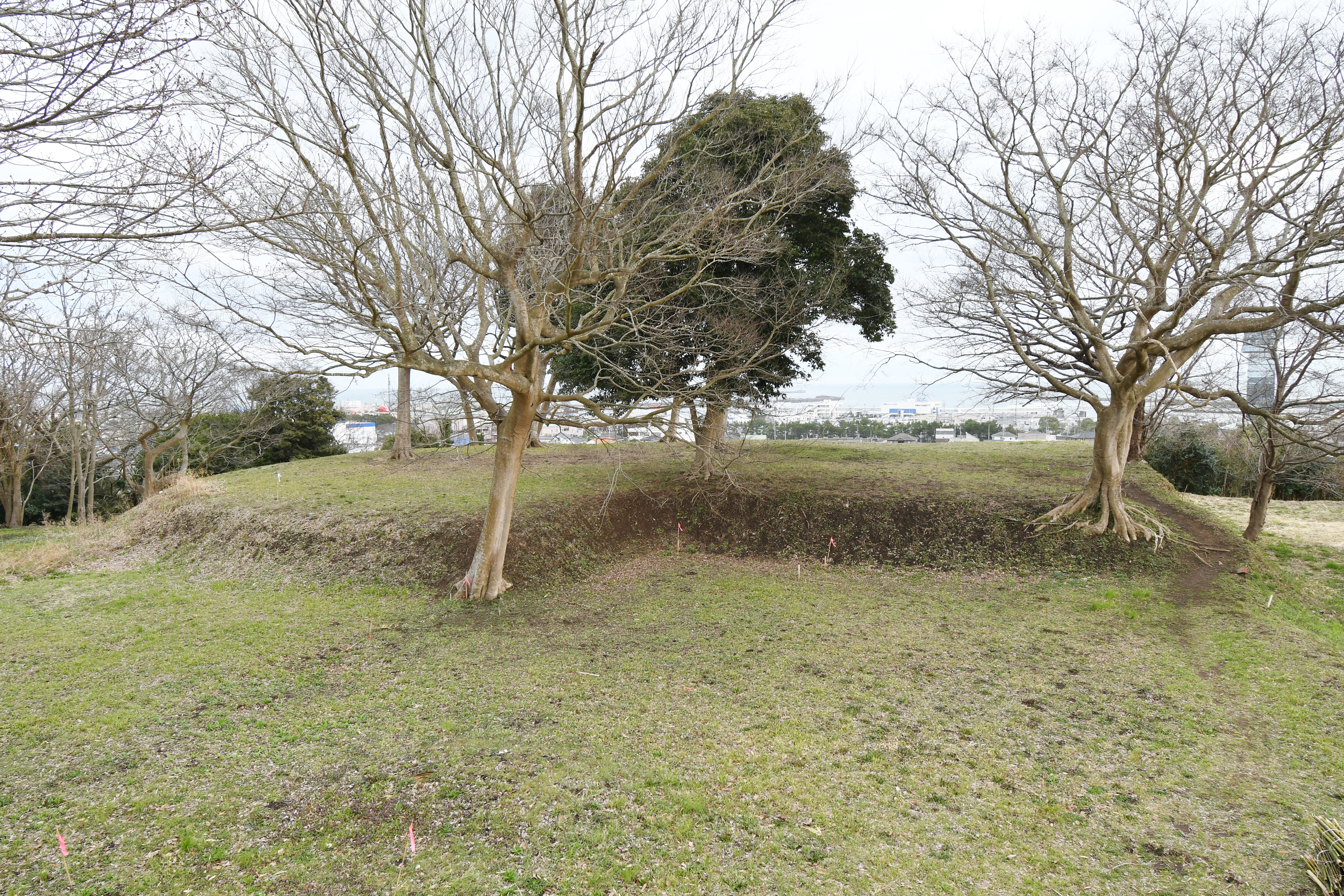
Site of Isohama Jin'ya

== See also ==
- List of Historic Sites of Japan (Ibaraki)
