= Chōjayama Kanga ruins =

Archaeological site in Japan

- 長者山官衙遺跡 (Japanese)
- Chōjayama Kanga ruins Chōjayama Kanga ruins (Japan)
- 36°41′00″N 140°42′14″E
- Periods: Nara - Heian period
- Location: Hitachi, Ibaraki, Japan
- Region: Kantō region

Site notes
- Area: 45,879.42 m^{2} (493,842.0 sq ft)
- Public access: Yes

The Chōjayama Kanga ruins (長者山官衙遺跡, Chōjayama kanga iseki) is an of archaeological site with the ruins of a Nara to Heian period government administrative complex, and a portion of an ancient road, located in what is now the Jūō neighborhood of the city of Hitachi in Ibaraki prefecture in the northern Kantō region of Japan. The site has been protected as a National Historic Site from 2018.

== Overview ==
In the late Nara period, after the establishment of a centralized government under the Ritsuryō system, local rule over the provinces was standardized under a kokufu (provincial capital), and each province was divided into smaller administrative districts, known as (郡, gun, kōri), composed of 2–20 townships in 715 AD. Each of the units had an administrative complex built on a semi-standardized layout based on contemporary Chinese design.

The Chōjayama Kanga ruins are located on the eastern edge of a plateau, at an elevation of 20 to 25 meters north of the modern city center of Hitachi. It is believed to correspond to a location described in the "Hitachi Kokudo Fudoki". Per an archaeological excavation conducted over two periods in 2005 and 2015, a moat-surrounded trapezoidal compound measuring 134 to 165 meters east-to-west by 110 to 116 meters north-to-south was discovered. The compound was on the eastern side of a road trace that is thought to be an ancient government road with a width of 5.5 to 6.7 meters. Within the compound were the foundations of excavated pillar buildings and cornerstone buildings from the 8th century to the 10th century, arranged in a "U" shape around a central courtyard. The remains can be roughly divided into three periods. Period I corresponds to the latter half of the 7th century to the middle of the 8th century, and consisted of at least twelve buildings. Phase II corresponds to the middle of the 8th century to the middle of the 9th century and consisted of nine excavated pillar buildings. Phase III corresponds to the middle of the 9th century to the 10th century, and consisted of eight cornerstone buildings, all of which are believed to have been warehouses. Carbonized grains have been excavated from the soil, indicating that bundled ears of rice had been destroyed by a fire, after which the site appears to have been abandoned.

The site is located in a woodland behind a small Atago Jinja Shinto shrine and was backfilled after excavation.

== See also ==
- List of Historic Sites of Japan (Ibaraki)
