= Torazuka Kofun =

Kofun period burial mound in Japan

- 虎塚古墳 (Japanese)
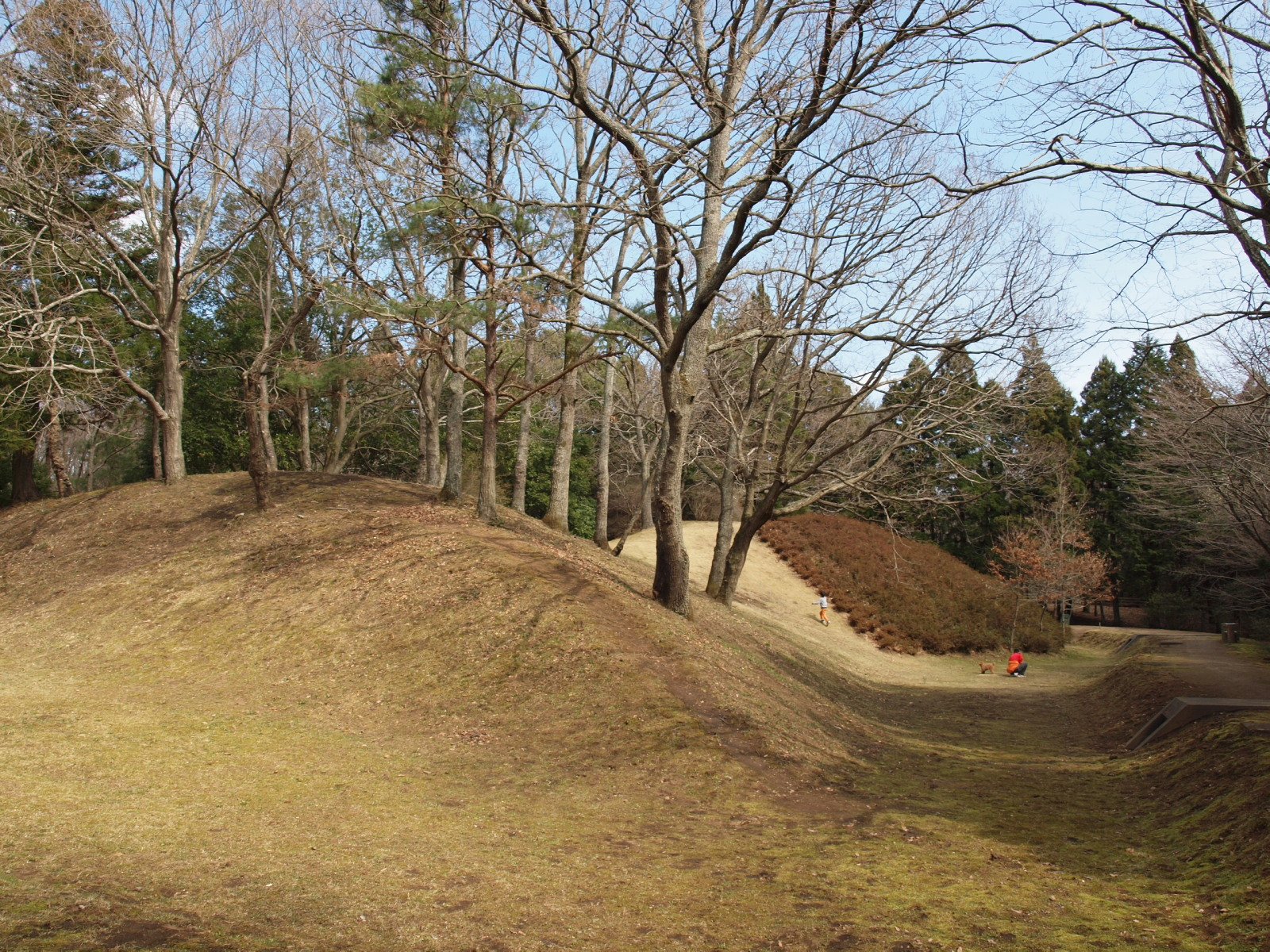
- Torazuka Kofun

- Torazuka Kofun Torazuka Kofun (Japan)
- 36°22′24.7″N 140°34′10.7″E
- Type: kofun
- Periods: Kofun period
- Location: Hitachinaka, Ibaraki Japan
- Region: Kantō region

History
- Built: early 7th century AD

Site notes
- Excavation dates: 1973
- Public access: Yes

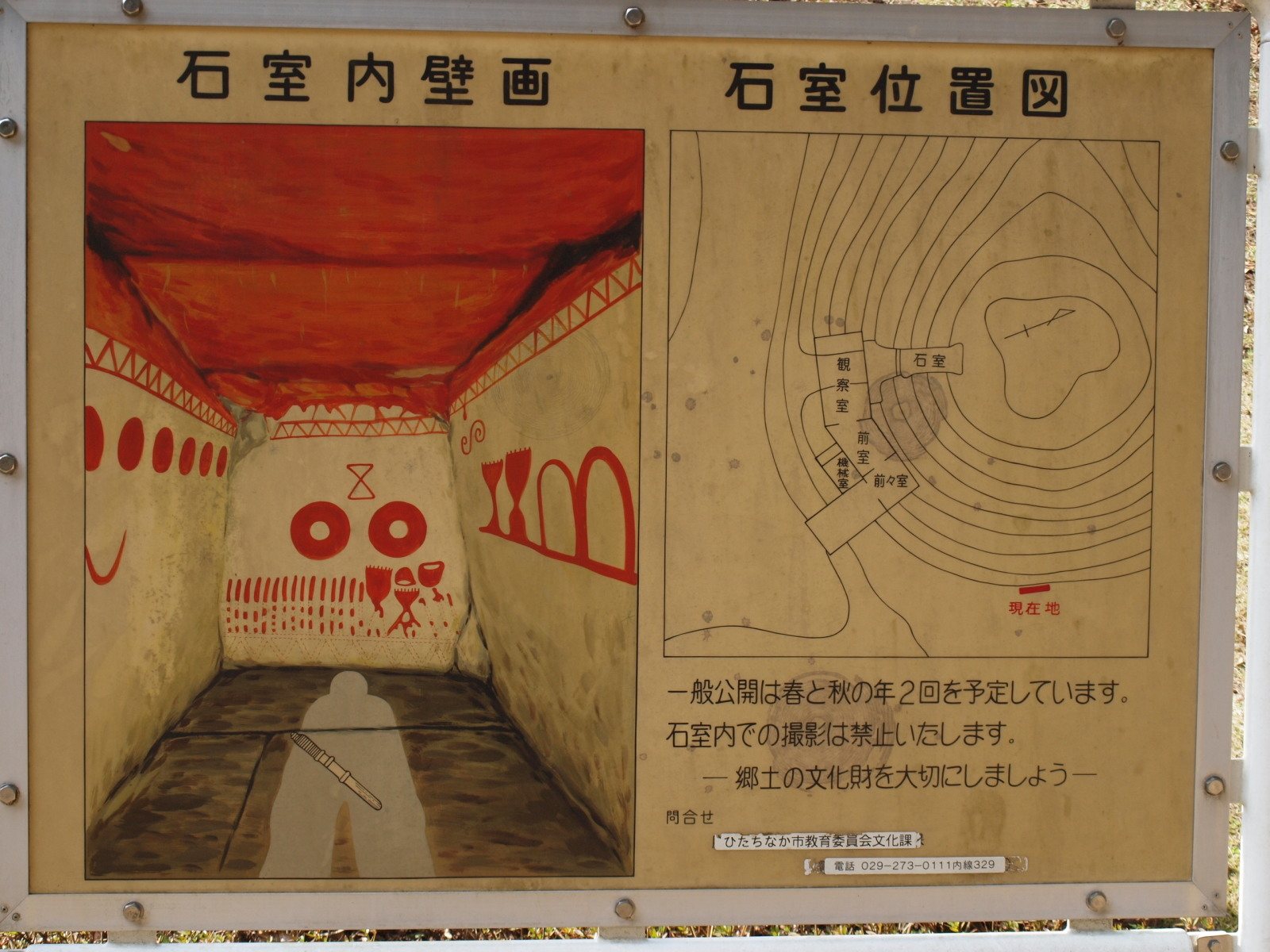
Signpost at Torazuka Kofun showing interior

The Torazuka Kofun (虎塚古墳) is a Kofun period burial mound located in what is now the Nakane neighborhood of city of Hitachinaka in Ibaraki Prefecture in the northern Kantō region of Japan. It received protection as a National Historic Site in 1974.

== Overview ==
The Torazuka Kofun is located in a forested plateau at an elevation of about 20 meters, where several other kofun tumuli have been found. It was excavated by Meiji University in 1973, and was found to be a rare example of a decorated kofun. The tumulus is a medium-sized zenpō-kōen-fun (前方後円墳), which is shaped like a keyhole, having one square end and one circular end, when viewed from above, with a total length of 56.5 meters. The tumulus was once surrounded by a moat.

Internally, the tumulus has a stone burial chamber made from large blocks of tuff that opens to the south side of the posterior circular portion, and which was found to be intact from ancient times. The chamber has a length of 2.8 meters, width of 1.8 meters, height of 1.4 meters. Within was the skeletal remains of one adult male. Grave goods included a lacquered small iron sword, iron spears, fragments of armor and horse harnesses, iron stirrups, and other items. Of great interest was that the walls, floor and ceiling of the burial chamber had been painted and decorated. The floor and ceiling were vermillion, whereas the walls were coating in a white clay and covered with geometric patterns in vermillion. These drawings included concentric circles, hourglass-shaped designed and a serrated border at the ceiling.

The opening of the burial chamber was the first time in Japan that a scientific survey (for temperature and humidity, microorganisms, etc.) had been conducted prior to the opening of the intact stone chamber. The construction of the tumulus is estimated to be in the first half of the 7th century.

The tumulus is open to the public for a couple of days each year in the spring March–April and autumn November. It is located about 15 minutes by car from Katsuta Station on the JR East Jōban Line. Or about five minutes by car from Nakane Station on the Minato Line.

Total length
56.5 meters:
Anterior rectangular portion
38.5 meters wide x 7.2 meters high
Posterior circular portion
32.5 meter diameter x 7.5 meters

== See also ==
- List of Historic Sites of Japan (Ibaraki)
