= List of mergers in Ibaraki Prefecture =

Here is a list of mergers in Ibaraki Prefecture, Japan since the Heisei era.

== Mergers before April 1, 1999 ==
- On September 1, 1995 - the town of Kashima absorbed the village of Ōno (both from Kashima District) to create the city of Kashima.

== Mergers from April 1, 1999 to Present ==
- On April 1, 2001 - the town of Itako absorbed the town of Ushibori (both from Namegata District) to create the city of Itako.
- On February 2, 2002 - the town of Moriya (from Kitasōma District) was elevated to city status.
- On November 1, 2002 - the town of Kukizaki (from Inashiki District) were merged into the expanded city of Tsukuba.
- On October 16, 2004 - the town of Yamagata, the village of Gozenyama (both from Higashiibaraki District), the town of Ōmiya, and the villages of Miwa and Ogawa (all from Naka District), were merged to create the city of Hitachiōmiya.
- On November 1, 2004 - the town of Jūō (from Taga District) was merged into the expanded city of Hitachi. Taga District was dissolved as a result this merger.
- On December 1, 2004 - the town of Kanasagō, and the village of Satomi and Suifu (all from Kuji District) were merged into the expanded city of Hitachiōta.
- On January 21, 2005 - the town of Naka absorbed the town of Urizura (both from Naka District) to create the city of Naka.
- On February 1, 2005 - the town of Jōhoku, the village of Katsura (both from Higashiibaraki District), and the village of Nanakai (from Nishiibaraki District) were merged to create the town of Shirosato.
- Also on February 1, 2005 - the town of Uchihara (from Higashiibaraki District) was merged into the expanded city of Mito.
- On March 22, 2005 - the towns of Azuma, Edosaki and Shintone, and the village of Sakuragawa (all from Inashiki District) were merged to create the city of Inashiki.
- Also on March 22, 2005 - the city of Iwai was merged with the town of Sashima (from Sashima District) to create the city of Bandō.
- On March 28, 2005 - the town of Fujishiro (from Kitasōma District) was merged into the expanded city of Toride.
- Also on March 28, 2005 - the city of Shimodate was merged with the towns of Akeno, Kyōwa and Sekijō (all from Makabe District) to create the city of Chikusei.
- Also on March 28, 2005 - the town of Kasumigaura absorbed the town of Chiyoda (both from Niihari District) to create the city of Kasumigaura.
- On August 1, 2005 - the town of Kamisu absorbed the town of Hasaki (both from Kashima District) to create the city of Kamisu.
- On September 2, 2005 - the towns of Asō, Kitaura and Tamatsukuri (all from Namegata District) were merged to create the city of Namegata. Namegata District was dissolved as a result of this merger.
- On September 12, 2005 - the old city of Koga absorbed the towns of Sanwa and Sōwa (both from Sashima District) to create the new and expanded city of Koga.
- On October 1, 2005 - the town of Makabe, the village of Yamato (both from Makabe District), and the town of Iwase (from Nishiibaraki District) were merged to create the city of Sakuragawa. Makabe District was dissolved as a result of this merger.
- On October 1, 2005 - the old city of Ishioka absorbed the town of Yasato (from Niihari District) to create the new and expanded city of Ishioka.
- On October 11, 2005 - the town of Hokota absorbed the villages of Asahi and Taiyō (all from Kashima District) to create the city of Hokota. Kashima District was dissolved as a result of this merger.
- On January 1, 2006 - the old city of Shimotsuma absorbed the village of Chiyokawa (from Yūki District) to create the new and expanded city of Shimotsuma.
- On January 1, 2006 - the town of Ishige (from Yūki District) was merged into the expanded city of Mitsukaido. Mitsukaido changed the name to Jōsō at the same time.
- On February 20, 2006 - the village of Niihari (from Niihari District) was merged into the expanded city of Tsuchiura.
- On March 19, 2006 - the towns of Iwama and Tomobe (both from Nishiibaraki District) were merged into the expanded city of Kasama. Nishiibaraki District was dissolved as a result of this merger.
- On March 27, 2006 - the towns of Ogawa and Minori (both from Higashiibaraki District), and the village of Tamari (from Niihari District) were merged to create the city of Omitama. Niihari District was dissolved as a result of this merger.
- On March 27, 2006 - the town of Ina, and the village of Yawara (both from Tsukuba District) were merged to create the city of Tsukubamirai. Tsukuba District was dissolved as a result of this merger.
