= Ibaraki dialect =

Japanese dialect

- 茨城弁
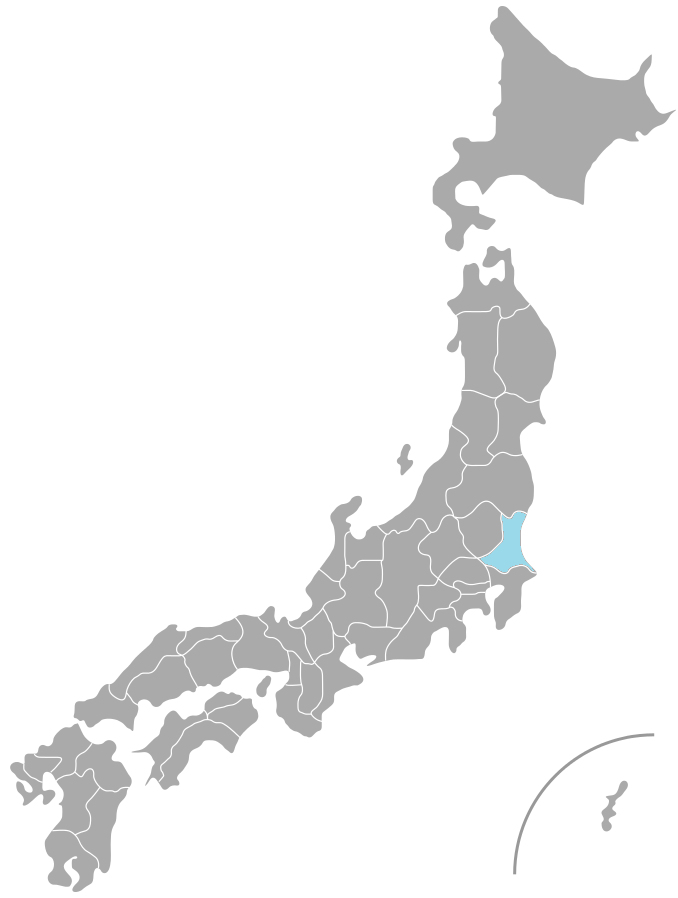
- Ibaraki dialect area.
- Native to: Japan
- Region: Ibaraki
- Language family: Japonic: Japanese; Eastern Japanese; (Debated) Kantō; (Debated) Eastern; Ibaraki dialect
- Dialects: Northern; Southwest; Southern

Language codes
- ISO 639-3: –
- Glottolog: ibar1242
- IETF: ja-u-sd-jp08

The Ibaraki dialect (Shinjitai: 茨城弁, Kyujitai: 茨城辯 Ibaraki-ben) is a Japanese dialect spoken in Ibaraki Prefecture. It is noted for its distinctive use of the sentence-ending particles べ (be) and っぺ (ppe) and an atypical intonation pattern that rises in neutral statements and falls in questions. It is also noted for its merging of certain vowels, frequent consonant voicing, and a relatively fast rate of speech.

== Classification ==
Historically, the forms of Japanese spoken in the area that constitutes modern-day Ibaraki were not treated as a unified dialect until the formation of the prefecture in 1871. Conflicting opinions have existed regarding its classification, however. Along with the Tochigi dialect, the Ibaraki dialect is considered a part of the wider North Kantō dialect, with some shared traits with traditional Tokyo dialects. Despite this, several notable similarities with Tōhoku dialects have created debate over this status. Support for a Kantō dialect classification has come from Japanese language experts such as Misao Tōjō and Katsuo Ōhashi, who placed it as part of ‘East Kantō’ and ‘Northwest Kantō’ dialects, respectively. Other experts, such as Tsuneo Tsuzuku and Haruhiko Kindaichi, have supported its classification as a Tōhoku dialect. When assigning Ibaraki to a regional group, Tsuzuku and Kindaichi both added it to nearly identical areas that include Tochigi, Fukushima, southern Iwate, and eastern Yamagata.

Subdivisions

Yoshio Taguchi proposed the following subdivisions in 1939, dividing it into northern, southwest, and southern.

- Northern: Centred around the districts of Taga, Kuji, and Naka. Includes parts of Higashiibaraki and Kashima.
- Southwest: Consists of most of the former Shimōsa Province. Centred around Sashima District and includes Yuki, Kitasōma, and west Makabe.
- Southern: Centred around the districts of Niihari and Inashiki. Includes Namegata, Tsukuba, Nishiibaraki, and the remainder of Makabe.

== Phonology ==
The Ibaraki dialect is phonetically distinct from standard Japanese and more closely resembles other Kantō and Tōhoku dialects. Among its most characteristic phonetic traits is the tendency for speakers to voice certain syllables that are usually unvoiced in standard Japanese. Specifically, syllables beginning with a k- or t- sound. For example, か (ka) is pronounced as が (ga), and た (ta) becomes だ (da). This means words like byōki (病気, "illness") sound closer to byōgi, and watashi (私, "I/me") becomes wadashi. Other notable traits include the reduced distinction between い (i) and え (e) sounds and ひ (hi) and へ (he) sounds; silent じ (ji), ず (zu), び (bi), and ぶ (bu) sounds in certain situations; vowel merging; and the absence of a pitch accent. Generally, differences in the spoken language are not reflected in the written language, where speakers will write in standard Japanese. Many of these traits are less common in urban areas and parts of the prefecture that are closer to Tokyo, where speakers tend more towards standard Japanese.

=== Syllable voicing ===
==== Voiced syllables ====
When occurring within or at the end of a word, syllables beginning with k- (か ka, き ki, く ku, け ke, こ ko) and t- (た ta, ち chi, つ tsu, て te, と to) become voiced. The ka at the end of tosaka (とさか, "cockscomb") is voiced to become ga, but the beginning to remains unvoiced to produce tosaga (とさが). Similarly, atashi (あたし, "I/me") becomes adashi (あだし), dekiru (できる, "to be able to") becomes degiru (でぎる), and kaki (かき, "persimmon") becomes kagi (かぎ). K- and t-starting syllables in particles and auxiliary verbs are also subject to voicing, i.e., nai kara (ないから, "because there is none") becomes nē gara (ねぇがら), and zureta no dewanai ka (ずれたのではないか, "it’s slipped out of place") becomes zureda n danē ga (ずれだんだねぇが). Occasionally, syllables occurring at the start of a word may also be voiced. For example, kaban (かばん, "bag") is pronounced as gaban (がばん).

In certain situations, voicing does not occur, including:

- When the k- and t-starting syllables come directly after a small-tsu (っ). For example, mikka (みっか, "three days") does not become migga, the kke in sokkenaku (そっけなく, "curtly, coldly") remains as kke, and kettei (けってい, "decision") is not pronounced as keddei.
- When the k- and t-starting syllables come directly after a ん (n) sound. For example, kinko (こんこ, "safe") does not become kingo, and bancha (ばんちゃ, "coarsely ground tea") does not become banja.
- When the k- and t-starting syllables are part of an onomatopoeic word. For example, pakapaka (ぱかぱか, "clip clop") and batabata (ばたばた, "noise, commotion") remain the same.

==== Semi-voiced and unvoiced syllables ====
In contrast to the frequent voicing of k- and t- starting syllables, じ (ji), ず (zu), び (bi), and ぶ (bu) sounds may become semi-voiced or unvoiced when directly proceeding a k- or i- sound. For example, the ji proceeding the ka in sanjikan (さんじかん) is not fully voiced, leading to a pronunciation closer to sanchikan (さんちかん). Other examples include mijikai (みじかい, "short") becoming michikai (みちかい), hazukashii (はずかしい, "embarrassed") becoming hatsukashii (はつかしい), and zabuton (ざぶとん, "cushion") becoming zaputon (ざぷとん).

Other than ji, zu, bi, and bu, syllables in certain words may be unvoiced. In a striking reversal of the dialects voicing tendency, the limit-indicating particle dake (だけ, "only") is unvoiced in the Ibaraki dialect, becoming take (たけ).

=== Decreased distinction between i and e ===
A renowned characteristic of the dialect is the reduced distinction between い (i) and え (e) sounds. Instead of a clear i or e, a sound somewhere in the middle is pronounced. The word Ibaraki (いばらき) has a clear i sound in standard Japanese but, in the Ibaraki dialect, the beginning i approaches an e sound, sounding closer to ebaraki to non-dialect speakers. Similarly, the i in shokuin (しょくいん, "staff member") changes to sound like shokuen (しょくえん), the standard Japanese pronunciation for "table salt". In contrast, the e in enpitsu (えんぴつ, "pencil") is pronounced closer to an i, and sounds more like inpitsu (いんぴつ). Pairs like eki (えき, "train station") and iki (いき, "breath") lose most of their distinction. This trait is pronounced enough to occasionally cause speakers to misspell words. This i – e merging is also seen in other Kantō and Tōhoku dialects, and, although widespread across Ibaraki, the trait is experiencing a decline due to decreasing usage among the younger generation.

=== Vowel merging ===
When occurring in succession, certain vowels have their sounds blended and lengthened. These include:

- a + i (あ + い) become ē (えぇ). For example:
  - akai (あかい, "red") → akē (あけぇ)
  - zaimoku (ざいもく, "lumber") → zēmoku (ぜぇもく).
  - Negative verb inflections, ending in the adjective nai (ない, "there isn’t"): nai → nē (ねぇ): shinai (しない, "do not") → shinē (しねぇ).
- a + e (あ + え) also become ē (えぇ). For example:
  - kaeru (蛙 or 帰る, both かえる, meaning "frog" and "go home" respectively) → kēru (けぇる).
- a + u (あ + う) become ā (あぁ). For example:
  - utau (うたう, "to sing") → udā (うだぁ).
  - kau (かう, "to buy") → kā (かぁ).

=== Pitch accent ===
Except for a small area surrounding Kamisu in the southeast tip of the prefecture, the Ibaraki dialect does not have a distinct pitch accent. This differs from standard Japanese and other western Kantō dialects, but is a trait shared with Fukushima, Miyagi and Tochigi dialects. Homophones that are usually distinguished by different pitch accents, such as hashi (橋, "bridge") and hashi (箸, "chopsticks"), are pronounced in a flat, identical tone.

== Grammar ==
=== Particle usage ===
Several particles rarely used in standard Japanese can be found in the Ibaraki dialect.

==== ppe (っぺ) and be (べ) ====
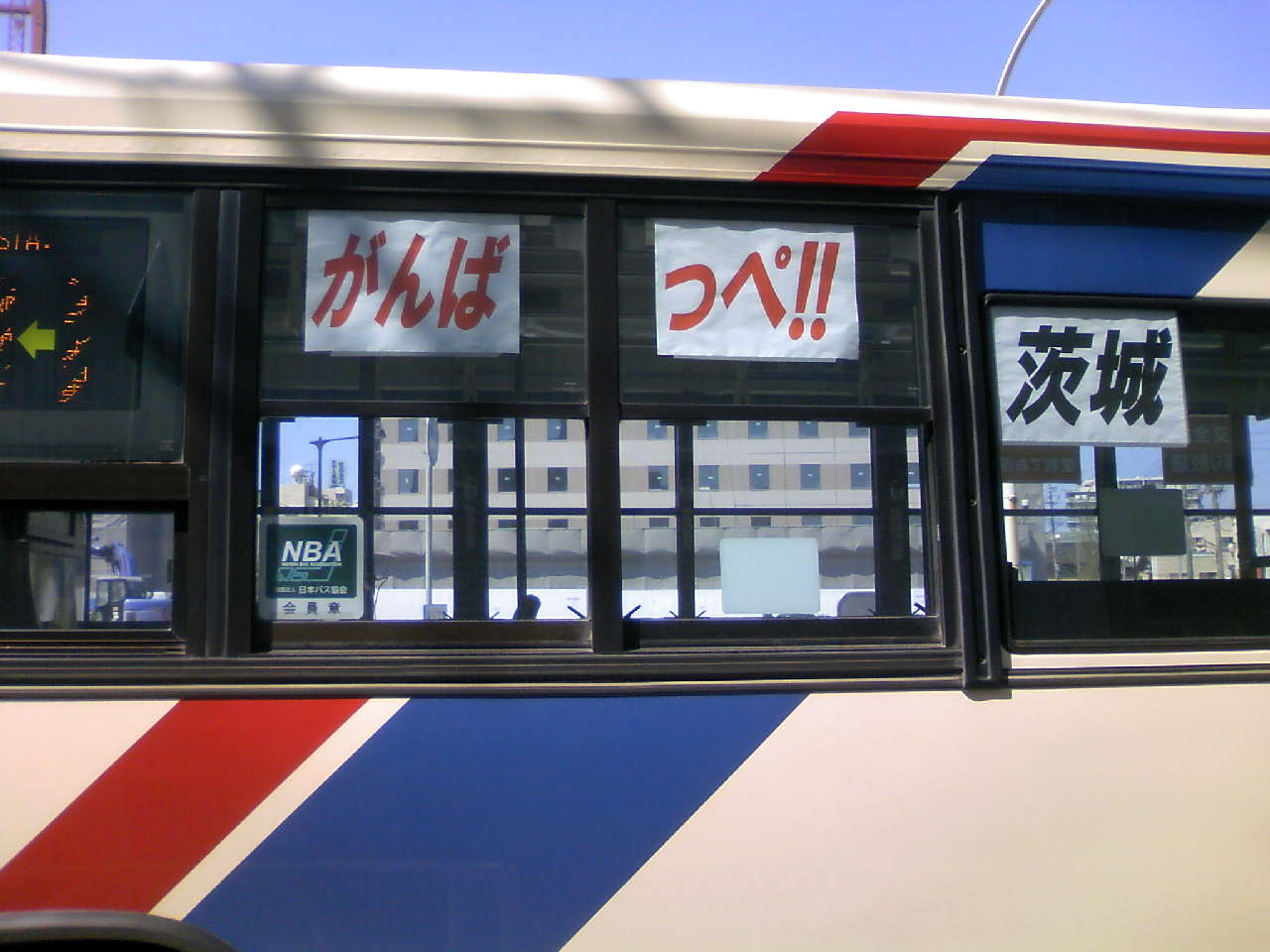
A bus with the phrase ganbappe (がんばっぺ), a dialectal variation of the standard Japanese ganbarō (がんばろう), meaning "let's try our best".

Sentence-ending particles used to express volition, persuasion, or conjecture. Morphological variants of kantō bei and remnants of the literary beshi (べし). Sometimes spoken as long sounds, i.e., bē (べー) and ppē (っぺー).

- Doushite darō, umai guai ni ikanai na (どうしてだろう、上手い具合にいかないな, "This isn’t going so well, I wonder why...")
  - → nandappe, umagu iganē na (なんだっぺ、うまぐいがねーな).
- Kore kara mito ni ikō yo (これから水戸に行こうよ, "Let’s go to Mito")
  - → ima gara mito sa igu be yo (今がら水戸さ行ぐべよ).

Although be usually attaches to the end of verbs without triggering inflection, the irregular verb kuru (来る, "to come") can become either kibē (きべー) or kube (くべ) when combined with be. Similarly, the irregular verb suru (為る, "to do") conjugates to shibe (しべ) or sube (すべ) when be is added. For a stronger expression of emotion than be, -ppe can be added to the stem form. For example, kiru be (切るべ, "I will cut it") is less emotive than kippe (切っぺ, "I will cut it"), which implies a stronger sense of volition.

- Kami o hasami de kirō (紙をハサミで切ろう, "I’m going to cut some paper")
  - → Kami o hasami de kippe (紙をハサミで切っぺ).
- Dō shiyō (どうしよう, "what shall [I] do?")
  - → dō sube (どうすべ) or dō suppe (どうすっぺ).
- Kaita darō (書いただろう, "I wrote it, didn’t I?")
  - → kaita be (書いたべ) or kaitappe (書いたっぺ).

==== sa (さ) ====
Case-marking particle used to denote direction. Equivalent to へ (he) or に (ni) in standard Japanese. Used in other parts of Kantō and Tōhoku.

- Mito he itte kita (水戸へ行ってきた, "I went to Mito")
  - → Mito sa itte kita (水戸さ行ってきた).

==== ke (け): recollection ====
Sentence-ending particle used to express recollection or reminiscence. Usually attaches to the end of past-tense verbs, i.e., those ending in た (ta), but may replace the final part altogether.

- Sō da, ano toki wa ame ga futte ita naa (そうだ、あのときは雨が降っていたなぁ, "It rained then, didn’t it...")
  - → Nda, antoki wa ame futtekkena (んだ、あんときは雨降ってっけな).

==== ke (け) and ge (げ): inquiry ====
Sentence-ending particle used to indicate a question. Roughly equivalent to か (ka) in standard Japanese. Usually pronounced as げ (ge) due to syllable voicing. Compared to ka, ke tends to show more intimacy with the listener as well as being politer.

- Sore wa hontō na no ka? (それは本当なのか？, "Is that really true?")
  - → Sore wa hontō na no ke / ge? (それは本当なのけ / げ？).
- Sō na no kai (そうなのかい, "I see")
  - →sokke (そっけ) or sōge (そうげ).

Speakers also tend to omit some particles in conversation, common to colloquial "common" Japanese spoken throughout Japan (which comes from Standard Japanese).

- Ame ga futte iru (雨が降っている, "It’s raining")
  - → Ame futteru (雨~~が~~降って~~い~~る).
- Mizu o nomu (水を飲む, "I drink water")
  - → Mizu nomu (水~~を~~飲む).

=== Verb conjugation ===
The past-tense standard form of the auxiliary verb shimau (しまう), shimatta (-しまった), becomes chitta (-ちった) in the Ibaraki dialect. For example, yonde shimatta (よんでしまった, "I read it" (expressing regret)) becomes yonchitta (よんちった). Words with the prefix bu- (ぶっ), usually used to indicate forceful emphasis (e.g., bukkowasu ぶっこわす, "to completely destroy"), are sometimes merged with the verb to which they are attached (i.e., bukkowasu ぶっこわす → bukkasu ぶっかす), and then lose their original meaning.

==== Inflection of the irregular verb kuru (来る) ====
Verb form	Standard Japanese	Ibaraki dialect	Notes
Negative	konai (こない, "don’t come")	kinai (きない)	Spoken as kunē (くねー) in some parts of northern Ibaraki.
Stem	ki- (き-)	ki- (き-)	Same as standard Japanese.
Plain	kuru (くる, "come")	kiru (きる)	Spoken as kuru in some areas.
Attributive	kuru (くる, "coming")	kiru (きる)	Spoken as kuru in some areas.
Hypothetical	kureba (くれば, "if [I] come")	kireba (きれば)	Spoken as kureba in some areas.
Imperative	koi (こい, "come" (command))	kiro / ko / kō (きろ・こ・こう)	Both ko and kō are more common than kiro.

=== Polite speech ===
Polite speech is not generally used, especially towards third parties. Passive-form auxiliary verbs used to show politeness such as reru (れる), rareru (られる), serareru (せられる), and saserareru (させられる) are rarely used, i.e., sensei ga korareru (先生が来られる, lit. "teacher comes" (polite)) is simply said as sensei ga kuru (先生が来る, lit. "teacher comes"). Polite verbs such as nasaru (なさる, "to do"), ni naru (になる, "to become, to be"), and kudasaru (くださる, used for polite requests) are used, but often have different spoken forms, as shown in the following examples:

- O-machi kudasai (mase) (お待ちください(ませ), "please wait").
  - → Matte-kunro (待ってくんろ) or matte-kuncho (待ってくんちょ).
- O-tomari kudasai (mase) (お泊りください(ませ), "please stay").
  - → Tomari-na (泊りな) or otomannansho (お泊んなんしょ).
- O-agari kudasai (mase) (お上がりください(ませ), "please eat").
  - → Agarassho (上がらっしょ) or agarasse (上がらっせ).
- Mite kudasai (mase) (見てください(ませ), "please look").
  - → Mina (見な), minasse (見なっせ), or mirassho (見らっしょ).
- Arukinasai (mase) (歩きなさい(ませ), "walk" (command)).
  - → Arukasse (歩かっせ).

== Notable words and phrases ==
- nandappe (なんだっぺ, roughly "what is it?"). Rough equivalent with nandarō (なんだろう) in standard Japanese.
- suppe (すっぺ, "let's do it"). Rough equivalent with shiyō (しよう).
- iku be (行くべ, "let's go"). Equivalent with ikō (行こう).
- gojappe (ごじゃっぺ, roughly "nonsense"). Similar to detarame (でたらめ) in standard Japanese.
- deresuke (でれすけ, "sloppy, careless man"). No exact equivalent in standard Japanese.
- ijiyakeru (いじやける, used to show frustration or anger).
