= Makabe Castle =

Japanese castle in Sakuragawa

- 真壁城
- Sakuragawa, Ibaraki Prefecture, Japan
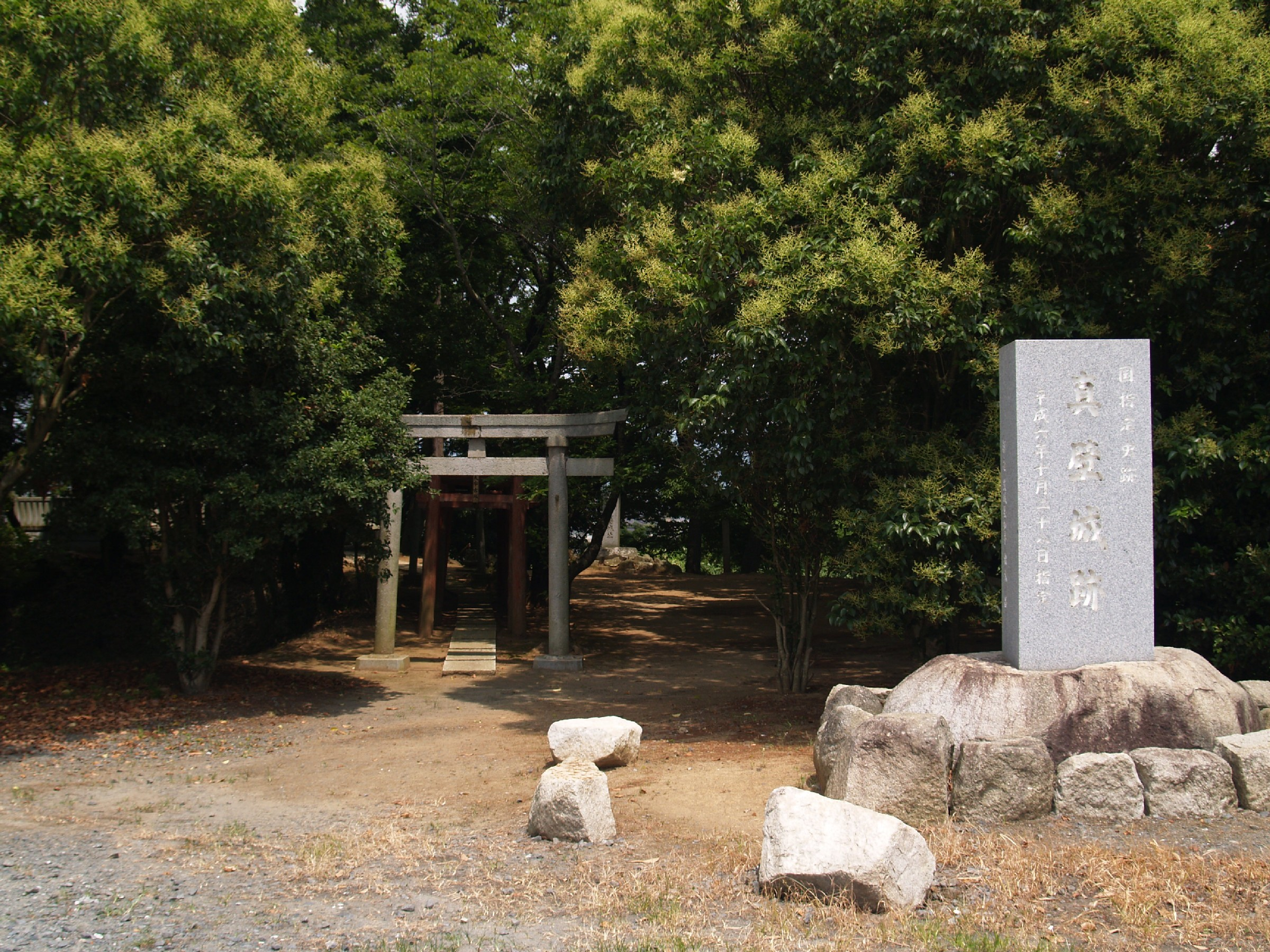

Site information
- Type: Hirayama- style Japanese
- Condition: ruins

Location
- Makabe Castle Makabe Castle (Japan)
- Coordinates: 36°16′25.4″N 140°6′38.4″E

Site history
- Built: 1172
- Demolished: 1622

Makabe Castle (真壁城, Makabe-jō) was a Sengoku period "hirayama"-style castle located in the Makabe neighborhood of the city of Sakuragawa, Ibaraki Prefecture, Japan. The ruins have been protected as a National Historic Site since 1994.

== Overview ==
The ruins of Makabe Castle are located east of Makabe, on a plateau at the western foot of Mount Ashio, an outlier of Mount Kaba. It consisted of two concentric enclosures, with a third enclosure forming a semi-circle to the east and a smaller fourth enclosure to the north, each surrounded by a water moat. The castle was first constructed in 1172, when a local warlord, Daijō Nagamoto, relocated to this site and changed his surname to "Makabe" after the name of an ancient county in the area.

The castle reappears in history during the Nanboku-chō period, during which time it was controlled by Kitabatake Chikafusa in 1341 with the Makabe clan serving as castellan and as jitō of the surrounding territory. The clan later changed its allegiance to the Northern Court and the Ashikaga shogunate. However, in 1428, the clan sided with Oguri Mitsushige in his rebellion against the Ashikaga. After their defeat at the hands of Ashikaga Mochiuji, the Makabe clan became divided, but Makabe Castle remained in the hands of a cadet branch as vassals of the Satake clan until the establishment of the Tokugawa shogunate. When the Satake clan was ordered in 1602 to relocate from their ancestral domains in Hitachi Province to Dewa Province, the Makabe clan accompanied their overlords and were given new lands in Kakunodate. In 1606, the castle and a 50,000 koku stipend was given as a retirement present to Asano Nagamasa, the last of Toyotomi Hideyoshi's Go-Bugyō. It was inherited by his son, Asano Nagashige, but in 1622, Nagashige was transferred to Kasama Domain and Makabe Castle was abandoned.

One of the castle's gates has survived at the temple of Rakuhō-ji in former Yamato village, and one more gate at a private residence in former Kyōwa town. The area of the castle west of the second bailey has largely disappeared under urbanization, but much of the inner bailey has survived, with the Makabe town gymnasium located in the middle. Since 1934, the site has been protected as a Ibaraki Prefecture historic site, and was granted national status in 1994. Archaeological excavations since 1997 have revealed the earthworks and trenches of the outer moat, as well as traces of buildings and what was once a Noh stage.

The ruins are approximately 20 minutes by car from Iwase Station on the JR East Mito Line.

== See also ==
- List of Historic Sites of Japan (Ibaraki)

== Literature ==
- Schmorleitz, Morton S. (1974). Castles in Japan. Tokyo: Charles E. Tuttle Co. pp. 144–145. ISBN 0-8048-1102-4.
- Motoo, Hinago (1986). Japanese Castles. Tokyo: Kodansha. p. 200 pages. ISBN 0-87011-766-1.
- Mitchelhill, Jennifer (2004). Castles of the Samurai: Power and Beauty. Tokyo: Kodansha. p. 112 pages. ISBN 4-7700-2954-3.
- Turnbull, Stephen (2003). Japanese Castles 1540-1640. Osprey Publishing. p. 64 pages. ISBN 1-84176-429-9.
