= Makabe =

Makabe may refer to:

- Makabe District, Ibaraki, a district in Ibaraki Prefecture, Japan
- Makabe, Ibaraki, a town in Makabe District, Ibaraki Prefecture, Japan
- Makabe (surname), a Japanese surname
