= Ogawa, Ibaraki =

Ogawa, Ibaraki may refer to:

- Ogawa-machi, town in Higashiibaraki District, Ibaraki Prefecture
- Ogawa-mura, village in Naka District, Ibaraki Prefecture
