= Ibaraki 5th district =

- Parliamentary constituency for the Japanese House of Representatives
- Numbered map of Ibaraki Prefecture single-member districts
- Prefecture: Ibaraki
- Proportional District: Northern Kanto
- Electorate: 237,265

Current constituency
- Created: 1994
- Seats: One
- Party: DPP
- Representative: Satoshi Asano
- Municipalities: Cities of Hitachi, Kitaibaraki, and Takahagi District of Naka.

Ibaraki 5th district (茨城県第5区, Ibaraki-ken dai-goku or simply 茨城5区, Ibaraki-goku) is a single-member constituency of the House of Representatives in the national Diet of Japan located in Ibaraki Prefecture.

== Areas covered ==
=== Since 2013 ===
- Hitachi
- Kitaibaraki
- Takahagi
- Naka District

== List of representatives ==
Election	Representative	Party	Notes
1996	Shunpei Tsukahara	LDP	
1998 by-el	Hideo Okabe	LDP	
2000	Akihiro Ohata	Democratic	
2003	Akihiro Ohata	Democratic	
2005	Akihiro Ohata	Democratic	
2009	Akihiro Ohata	Democratic	
2012	Akihiro Ohata	Democratic	
2014	Akihiro Ohata	Democratic	
2014	Akihiro Ohata	Democratic	
2017	Akimasa Ishikawa	LDP	
2021	Satoshi Asano	DPP	
2024	Satoshi Asano	DPP	
2026	Satoshi Asano	DPP	

== Election results ==
=== 2026 ===
2026
Party	Candidate	Votes	%	±%
DPP	Satoshi Asano (Incumbent)	70,438	60.4	▲6.71
LDP	Takumi Suzuki (Won a Seat in the PR Block)	46,141	39.6	▲0.62
Majority		24,297	20.8	▲6.09
Registered electors		229,095		
Turnout		116,579	52.56 52.96	▼0.40
DPP hold				

=== 2024 ===
2024
Party	Candidate	Votes	%	±%
DPP	Satoshi Asano (Incumbent)	64,351	53.69	▲5.20
LDP	Akimasa Ishikawa	46,717	38.98	▼3.59
JCP	Tatsuo Chiba	8,781	7.33	▲0.96
Majority		17,634	14.71	
Registered electors		232,960		
Turnout			52.56	▼0.74
DPP hold				

=== 2021 ===
2021
Party	Candidate	Votes	%	±%
DPP	Satoshi Asano	61,373	48.49	New
LDP	Akimasa Ishikawa (Incumbent) (Won PR seat)	53,878	42.57	▼5.60
JCP	Miyako Iida	8,061	6.37	▼1.49
Independent	Hiroshi Tamura	3,248	2.57	New
Majority		7,495	5.92	
Registered electors		241,755		
Turnout			53.30	▲1.19
DPP gain from LDP				

=== 2017 ===
2017
Party	Candidate	Votes	%	±%
LDP	Akimasa Ishikawa	61,450	48.17	▲5.41
Kibō no Tō	Satoshi Asano (Won PR seat)	56,098	43.97	New
JCP	Atsuko Kawasaki	10,027	7.86	▼1.08
Majority		5,352	4.20	
Registered electors		249,839		
Turnout			52.11	▲0.23
LDP gain from Democratic				

=== 2014 ===
2014
Party	Candidate	Votes	%	±%
Democratic	Akihiro Ohata (Incumbent)	60,688	48.30	▼1.00
LDP	Akimasa Ishikawa (Won PR seat)	53,732	42.76	▲0.96
JCP	Akira Fukuda	11,239	8.94	▲0.04
Majority		6,956	5.54	
Registered electors		249,720		
Turnout			51.88	
Democratic hold				

=== 2012 ===
2012
Party	Candidate	Votes	%	±%
Democratic	Akihiro Ohata (Incumbent)	61,142	49.30	▼11.97
LDP	Akimasa Ishikawa (Won PR seat)	51,841	41.80	▲5.42
JCP	Akira Fukuda	11,043	8.90	N/A
Majority		9,301	7.50	
Registered electors				
Turnout				
Democratic hold				

=== 2009 ===
2009
Party	Candidate	Votes	%	±%
Democratic	Akihiro Ohata (Incumbent)	91,855	61.27	▲11.88
LDP	Hideaki Okabe	54,541	36.38	▼9.93
Happiness Realization	Kōta Noguchi	3,513	2.35	New
Majority		37,314	24.89	
Registered electors				
Turnout				
Democratic hold				

=== 2005 ===
2005
Party	Candidate	Votes	%	±%
Democratic	Akihiro Ohata (Incumbent)	74,753	49.39	
LDP	Hideaki Okabe (Won PR seat)	70,098	46.31	
JCP	Kuniyoshi Fujita	6,511	4.30	
Majority		4,655	3.08	
Registered electors				
Turnout				
Democratic hold				
