= Akihiro Ohata =

Japanese politician

- 大畠 章宏
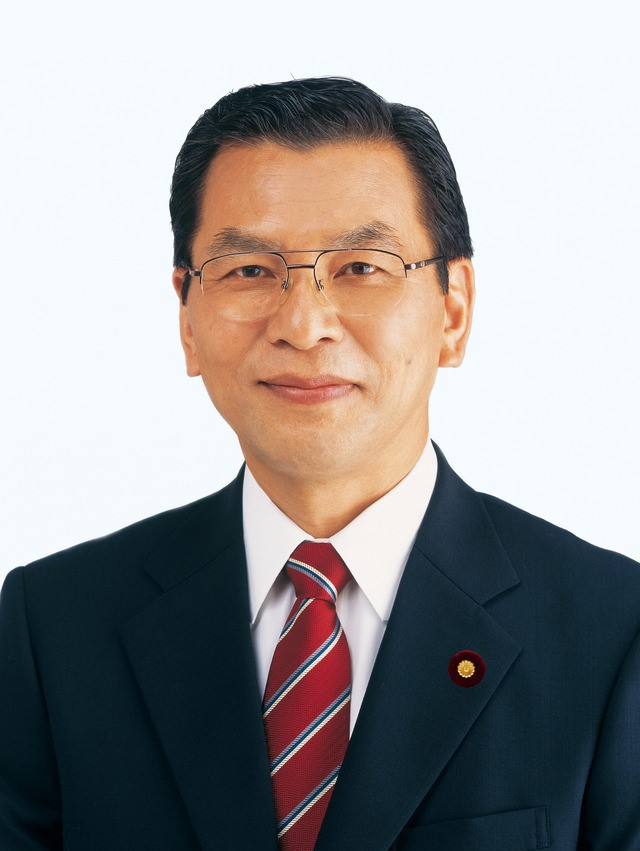
- Official portrait, 2010

Minister of Land, Infrastructure, Transport and Tourism
- In office 14 January 2011 – 2 September 2011
- Prime Minister: Naoto Kan
- Preceded by: Sumio Mabuchi
- Succeeded by: Takeshi Maeda

Minister of Economy, Trade and Industry
- In office 17 September 2010 – 14 January 2011
- Prime Minister: Yukio Hatoyama; Naoto Kan
- Preceded by: Masayuki Naoshima
- Succeeded by: Banri Kaieda

Member of the House of Representatives; from Northern Kanto
- In office 19 February 1990 – 28 September 2017
- Preceded by: Toyoji Shirochi
- Succeeded by: Akimasa Ishikawa
- Constituency: Ibaraki 2nd (1990–1996); PR block (1996–2000); Ibaraki 5th (2000–2017)

Member of the Ibaraki Prefectural Assembly
- In office 1986–1990

Personal details
- Born: 5 October 1947 (age 78) Jōhoku, Ibaraki, Japan
- Party: DPP (since 2018)
- Other political affiliations: JSP (until 1996); SDP (1996); DP 1996 (1996–1998); DPJ (1998–2016); DP 2016 (2016–2018)
- Education: Tokyo City University
- Website: Official website

Akihiro Ohata (大畠 章宏, Ōhata Akihiro; born 5 October 1947) is a Japanese politician of the Democratic Party of Japan, a member of the House of Representatives in the Diet (national legislature). A native of Higashiibaraki District, Ibaraki, he attended the Musashi Institute of Technology as both undergraduate and graduate. He was elected to the assembly of Ibaraki Prefecture where he served for one term and then to the House of Representatives for the first time in 1990 as a member of the Japan Socialist Party.

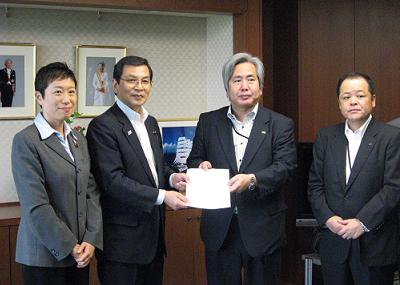
Ohata with representatives of the General Federation of Private Railway and Bus Workers' Unions of Japan in 2011

Political offices
Preceded by Sumio Mabuchi	Minister of Land, Infrastructure, Transport and Tourism; 2011	Succeeded by Takeshi Maeda
Preceded by Masayuki Naoshima	Minister of Economy, Trade and Industry; 2010–2011	Succeeded by Banri Kaieda
House of Representatives (Japan)
Preceded by Hideaki Okabe	Representative for Ibaraki 5th district 2000–present	Incumbent
New title introduction of proportional representation	Representative for the Northern Kantō PR block 1996–2000	Succeeded by N/A
Preceded by Seiroku Kajiyama; Toyoji Shirochi; Shunpei Tsukahara	Representative for Ibaraki 2nd district (multi-member); 1990–1996; Served alongside: Seiroku Kajiyama, Shunpei Tsukahara	District eliminated
