= Gunma dialect =

Japanese dialect of Gunma

- 群馬弁・上州弁
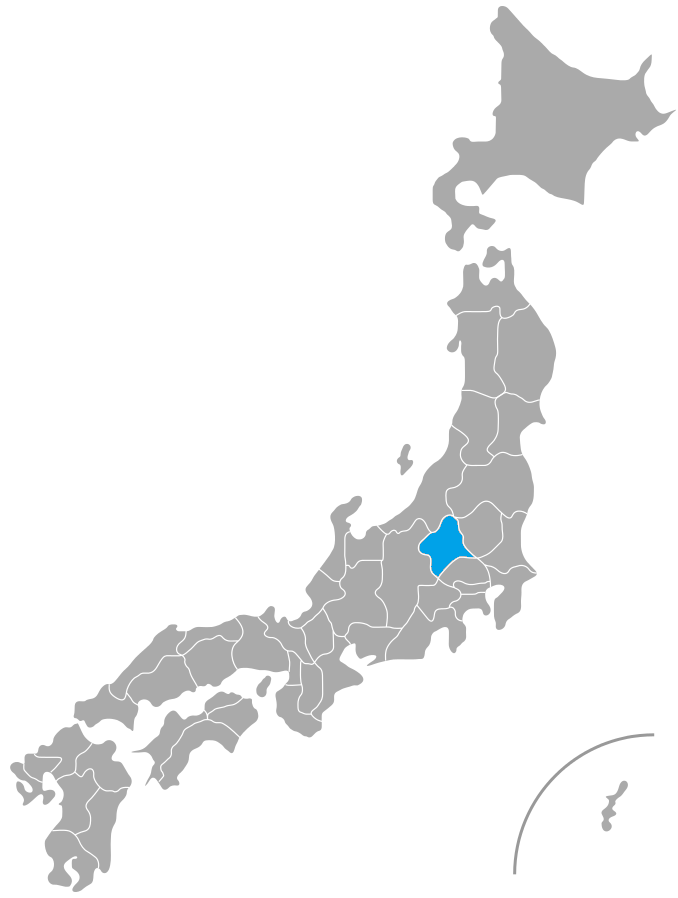
- Gunma dialect area.
- Native to: Japan
- Region: Gunma
- Language family: Japonic: Japanese; Eastern Japanese; Kantō; Western; Gunma dialect
- Dialects: Sankan; Heiya; Southeast

Language codes
- ISO 639-3: –

The Gunma dialect (Japanese: 群馬弁, Hepburn: Gunma-ben; also called jōshū-ben (上州弁) in Japanese) is a Japanese dialect spoken in Gunma Prefecture.

== Outline ==
Along with the Chiba, Saitama, Tama and Kanagawa dialects it is considered a West Kanto dialect. Despite sharing the North Kantō region with Ibaraki and Tochigi, the dialects of these respective prefectures (excluding the area around Ashikaga in Tochigi) are linguistically considered East Kanto dialects and differ considerably from the Gunma dialect. There is dialectical variation within the prefecture, with three sub-regions being classified: the mountainous area in the north and west of the prefecture, the plain area in the centre and the Southwest area. The far southeastern Ōra District has intermediate features of West and East Kanto dialects. Similarly to the Saitama dialect, there is no weakening of g-starting mora.

== Grammar ==
=== Negation ===
The negation auxiliary verb nai (ない), when attaching to the verb kuru (くる to come), becomes kinai (きない) or kinē (きねぇ). However, in Agatsuma District it is conjugated to konai (こない) or konē (こねぇ).

=== be (べ) particle ===
The particle be (べ), used to express volition, invitation and conjecture, is widely used in Kanto dialects, including Gunma (in the case of conjecture it is equivalent to darō (だろう) in standard Japanese). Historically, be was used in all three of these cases, but was influenced by the distinction between -u (-う)(volition) and darō (conjecture) in standard Japanese, leading to the emergence of a new dialectal phrase by the Showa Era, danbe (だんべ), which became used for conjecture. When used to express volition, be attaches to the conclusive form of Godan verbs and to the imperfective form of Ichidan verbs. In Agatsuma, where the negative form of kuru, konai, is used, it is conjugated as kobe (こべぇ) instead of kibe (きべぇ).

How the particle be (べ) and danbe (だんべ) attach to different verbs in the Gunma dialect
| | | | Volitional | | Conjecture | |
| Verb type | | Verb | Standard Japanese | Gunma dialect | Standard Japanese | Gunma dialect |
| Regular | Godan | aruku (あるく to walk) | arukō (あるこうlet's walk) | aruku be (あるくべ) | aruku darō (あるくだろう) | aruku danbe (あるくだんべ) |
| Regular | Ichidan | tateru (たてる to stand up) | tateyō (たてよう let's stand it up) | tate-be (たて-べ) | tateru darō (たてるだろう) | -tateru danbe (たてるだんべ) -tate-danbe (たて-だんべ) |
| Irregular | k-starting | kuru (くる to come) | koyō (こよう let's come) | -ku-be (く-べ) -ki-be (き-べ) | kuru darō (くるだろう) | -kuru danbe (くるだんべ) -kun-danbe (くん-だんべ) |
| Irregular | s-starting | suru (する to do) | shiyō (しよう let's do it) | -su-be (す-べ) -shi-be (し-べ) | suru darō (するだろう) | -suru danbe (するだんべ) -sun-danbe (すん-だんべ) |

==== Adjectives ====
For adjectives, be attaches to a syllabic nasal n (ん) affected -kari (-かり) ending (-かり → かん), to form examples such as the following:

- too-kanbe (とおかんべ its probably far).
- tsuyo-kanbe (つよかんべ (he's) probably strong).

In Tone and Agatsuma, there is small tsu (っ) insertion and be becomes pe (ぺ) like in the following examples.

- too-kappe (とおかっぺ).
- tsuyo-kappe (つよかっぺ).

This pe is also used elsewhere in Kantō, most notably in Tochigi and Ibaraki.

==== Recent shifts in usage ====
According to an investigation from 1980 to 2010 focussing on Gunma's younger generation, by 2010, the distinction between be and danbe had diminished and once more only be was now used to expressed volition, invitation and conjecture. In addition, a new dialectal expression, nbe (んべ), had begun to spread in 1980 from eastern Gunma and was now widespread across the prefecture. The same study also found that usage of the Ichidan verb [imperfective form + be] (e.g. mi-be (みべ)) and the [adjectival -kari + be] (e.g. too-kanbe (とおかんべ) had fallen markedly and the simple [conclusive form + be] had spread in its place (e.g. miru-be (みるべ) / tooe-be (とおえべ). In the 2010 younger generation sample, the [imperfective form + be], which is widely used across Kantō and Tōhoku, was predominantly used, followed by the Gunma-unique [imperfective form + nbe]. Nbe is thought to have originated from the syllabic nasal-affected conclusive form; the ru in miru-be became n to form minbe, which had the nbe segment taken and used as a separate form.

== Pitch accent ==
Other than areas that have a vague accent or no accent at all (such as around the town of Itakura), there is little disparity with the Tōkyō standard pitch accent. In urban areas, three-mora nouns such as asahi (あさひ morning sun), inochi (いのち life) and kokoro (こころ heart/mind) have their first mora stressed, e.g. asahi, inochi, kokoro, in concurrence with the Tokyo standard. In rural areas, however, there is a tendency for speakers to stress the middle mora, e.g. asahi, inochi, kokoro. A 1984 investigation carried out in Takasaki found that the words asahi, kokoro, namida (なみだ tear) and hashira (はしら post) were middle-mora stressed. Some pitch accent differences with standard Japanese are shown in the table below.

Differences in pitch accent with the Tōkyō standard
| Word | Tōkyō standard | Gunma dialect (Takasaki study) |
|---|---|---|
| akubi (欠伸 yawn) | akubi (あくび) (flat) | akubi (あくび) |
| ichigo (苺 strawberry) | ichigo (いちご) (flat) | ichigo (いちご) |
| kame (亀 tortoise) | kame (かめ) | kame (かめ) (rural areas) |
| kumo (雲 cloud) | kumo (くも) | kumo (くも) (rural areas) |
| hagi (萩 clover) | hagi (はぎ) | hagi (はぎ) (rural areas) |
| hato (鳩 pigeon) | hato (はと) | hato (はと) (mountainous area) |

== Notable words ==
| English | Standard Japanese | Gunma dialect |
|---|---|---|
| cute | kawaii (可愛い) | mojikkē (もじっけぇ)* |
| move | ugoku (動く) | igoku (いごく) |
| swallow | nomikomu (飲み込む) | dokkumu (どっくむ)† |
| a little | sukoshi (少し) | chittonbe (ちっとんべ) |
| not good | yokunai (良く無い) | unmakanai (うんまか無い) |
| really | hontō ni (本当に) | māzu (まあず) |
| more | motto (もっと) | matto (まっと) |
Key: * = spoken in western Agatsuma; † = only spoken in some areas
