= Chiyoda =

Chiyoda (千代田) is Japanese for "field of a thousand generations", and may refer to:

== Japanese places ==
- Chiyoda, Gunma
- Chiyoda, Hiroshima
- Chiyoda, Ibaraki
- Chiyoda, Saga
- Chiyoda, Tokyo, a ward
- Chiyoda, Chiyoda, Tokyo, a district in Chiyoda ward covering the Imperial Palace and the Higashi Gyoen, the publicly accessible East Garden

== Japanese naval ships ==
- Japanese gunboat Chiyodagata (1866), Japan's first domestically built, engine-powered warship
- Japanese cruiser Chiyoda (1891), a protected cruiser of the Imperial Japanese Navy during the First Sino-Japanese War, Russo-Japanese War and World War I
- Japanese aircraft carrier Chiyoda (1936), an aircraft carrier of the Imperial Japanese Navy during World War II
- JS Chiyoda (1983), a submarine rescue ship of the Japan Maritime Self-Defense Force

== Characters ==
- Chiyoda, a character in the game and media franchise Kantai Collection

== Others ==
- Chiyoda armored car
- Edo Castle or Chiyoda Castle, a flatland castle in Chiyoda, Tokyo, Japan
- Chiyoda Corporation, Japan - an engineering contractor in the oil and gas industry.
- Chiyoda Co., Ltd., a Japanese shoe manufacturer and retailer
- Tokyo Metro Chiyoda Line, a subway line in the Tokyo Metro system
- YGCO Chiyoda Station, a Japanese observatory for surveying near-Earth asteroids
- Chiyoda, a series of Japanese cars manufactured c.1932-1935 by Tokyo Gas and Electric Engineering Co. (later to become Isuzu)
- Chiyoda (camera manufacturer), a former name of the company which later became Minolta
- Momo Chiyoda, a fictional character in the manga The Demon Girl Next Door
