= Kyōwa (disambiguation) =

Kyōwa may refer to:

Places

- Kyōwa, Akita, a former town in Akita Prefecture
- Kyōwa, Hokkaidō, a town in Hokkaidō
- Kyōwa, Ibaraki, a former town in Ibaraki Prefecture
- Kyōwa Station, a railway station of Tōkaidō Main Line

Companies

Kyowa Optical Co., Ltd., a Japanese microscope and instrument manufacturer

Others

- Kyōwa, a Japanese era name
