= Yokohama dialect =

Yokohama dialect may refer to:

- The Kanagawa-dialect Japanese spoken in Yokohama
- Yokohama Pidgin Japanese, spoken between Japanese and foreigners in the 19th century
