= Satoshi Asano =

Japanese politician (born 1982)

- 浅野 哲
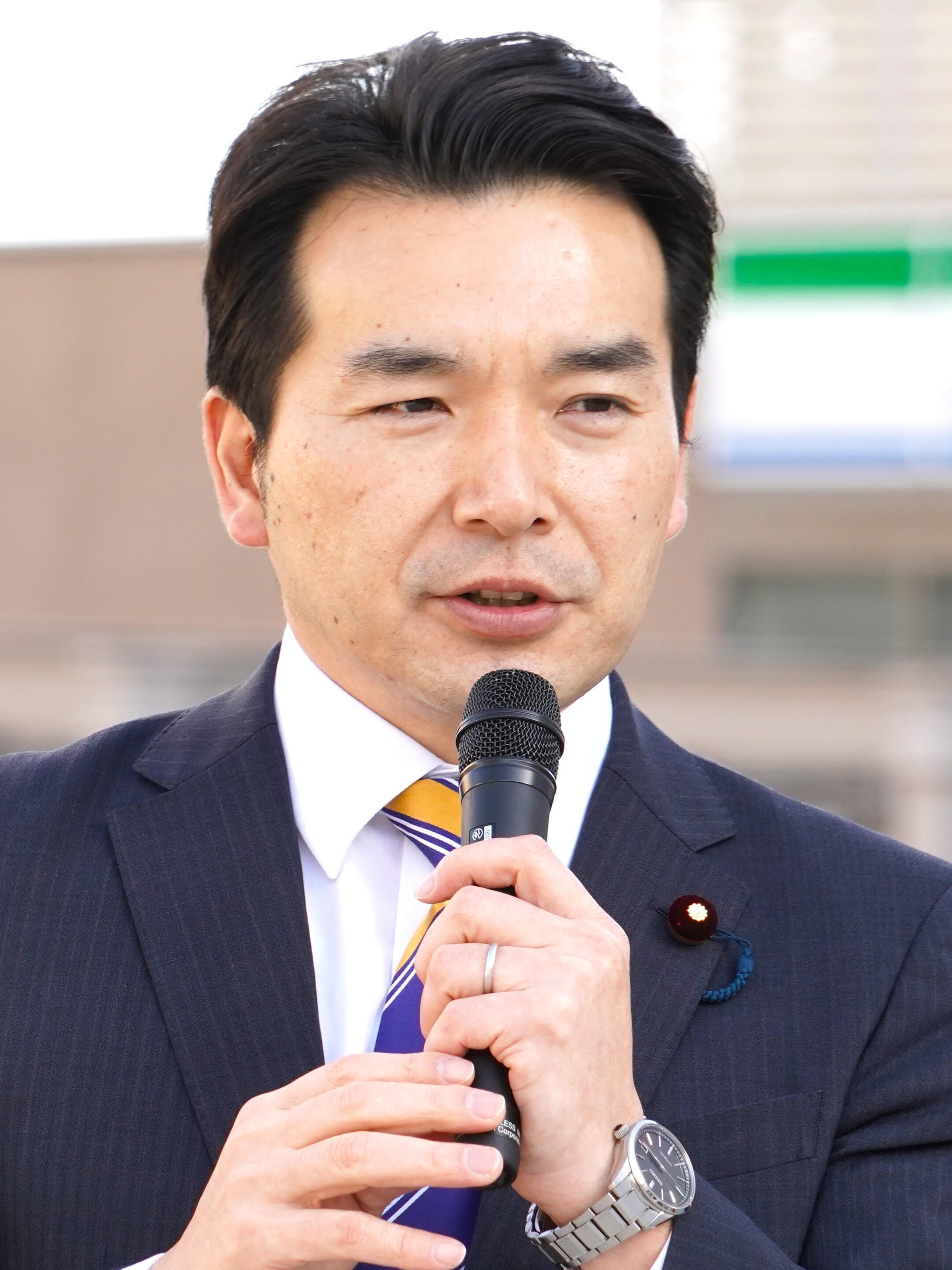
- Asano in 2025

Member of the House of Representatives
- Incumbent
- Assumed office 22 October 2017
- Constituency: Northern Kanto PR (2017–2021); Ibaraki 5th (2021–present)

Personal details
- Born: 25 September 1982 (age 43) Hachiōji, Tokyo, Japan
- Party: DPP (since 2018)
- Other political affiliations: DPJ (2015–2016); DP (2016–2017); KnT (2017–2018)
- Education: Aoyama Gakuin University

Satoshi Asano (浅野哲, Asano Satoshi; born 25 September 1982) is a Japanese politician serving as a member of the House of Representatives since 2017. From 2015 to 2017, he served as secretary to Akihiro Ohata.
