= Kasumigaura, Ibaraki (Niihari) =

Dissolved municipality in Niihari district, Ibaraki prefecture, Japan

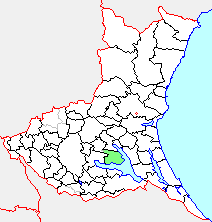
Map of Kasumigaura, Ibaraki

Kasumigaura (霞ヶ浦町, Kasumigaura-machi) was a town located in Niihari District, Ibaraki Prefecture, Japan.

On March 28, 2005, Kasumigaura absorbed the town of Chiyoda to elevate to city status and create the city of Kasumigaura.

As of April 1, 2002, final population count, the town had a population of 18,399. The total area was 70.27 km^{2}.
