= Kantō dialects =

Japanese dialects of the Kantō region

Kantō Japanese
- Native to: Japan
- Region: Kantō region
- Language family: Japonic: Japanese; Eastern Japanese; Kantō Japanese

Language codes
- ISO 639-3: –
- Glottolog: kant1251
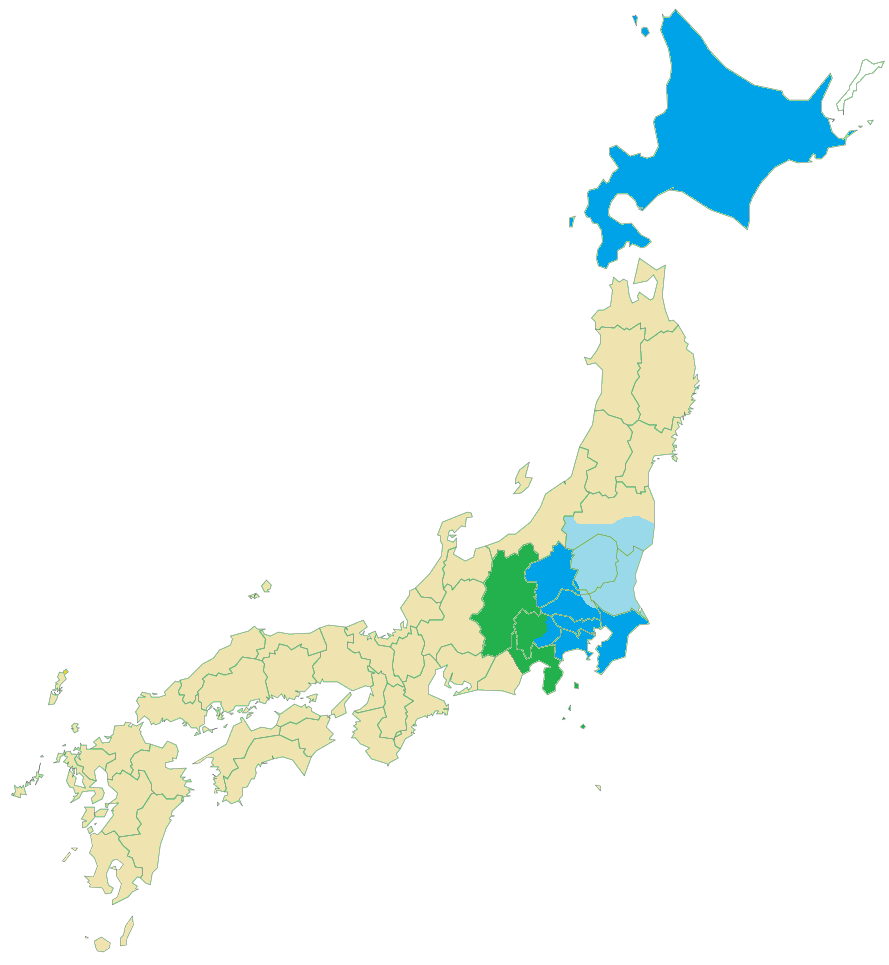
- Kantō dialects. Blue: Western Kantō and Hokkaidō. Azure: Eastern Kantō, transitional to Tōhoku. Green: Eastern Tōkai–Tōsan (Nagano–Yamanashi–Shizuoka), which lack the Western features of the more transitional Tōkai–Tōsan dialects.

The Kantō dialects (関東方言 kantō hōgen, 関東弁 kantō-ben) are a group of Japanese dialects spoken in the Kantō region (except for the Izu Islands). (Note: In northern Izu Islands are Tokai–Tosan dialects, and in the southern islands are the Hachijō dialects.) The Kantō dialects include the Tokyo dialect which is the basis of modern standard Japanese. Along with the Tōhoku dialect, Kantō dialects have been characterized by the use of a suffix -be or -ppe; Kantō speakers were called Kantō bei by Kansai speakers in the Edo period. Eastern Kantō dialects share more features with the Tōhoku dialect. After the Pacific War, the southern Kantō regions such as Kanagawa, Saitama, and Chiba prefectures developed as satellite cities of Tokyo, and today traditional dialects in these areas have been almost entirely replaced by standard Japanese.

== Kantō dialects ==
- Kantō dialects
  - West Kantō
    - Tokyo dialect (central Tokyo)
      - Yamanote dialect (old upper-class dialect)
      - Shitamachi dialect or Edo dialect (old working-class dialect)
    - Tama dialect (Western Tokyo)
    - Saitama dialect (Saitama Prefecture)
      - Chichibu dialect (Chichibu)
    - Gunma dialect or Jōshū dialect (Gunma Prefecture)
    - Kanagawa dialect (Kanagawa Prefecture)
    - Chiba dialect (Chiba Prefecture) (Note: northern Chiba Prefecture is a transitional area between Western and Eastern Kanto)
      - Bōshū dialect (Southern Chiba Prefecture)
    - Gun'nai dialect (Eastern Yamanashi Prefecture)
  - East Kantō
    - Ibaraki dialect (Ibaraki Prefecture)
    - Tochigi dialect (Tochigi Prefecture)
  - Northern Izu Archipelago dialects (Northern Izu Islands, Tokyo)

== Kantō Japanese in other regions ==
The Hokkaidō dialect is the closest to Standard Japanese because colonists from various regions settled the area, so that use of the standard language was required in order to facilitate communication. In the Ryukyu Islands, Standard Japanese developed into a dialect known as Okinawan Japanese, which has been influenced by the Ryukyuan languages.
