= Northern Izu Archipelago dialects =

Japanese dialects of the Izu Islands, Japan

- 北部伊豆諸島方言
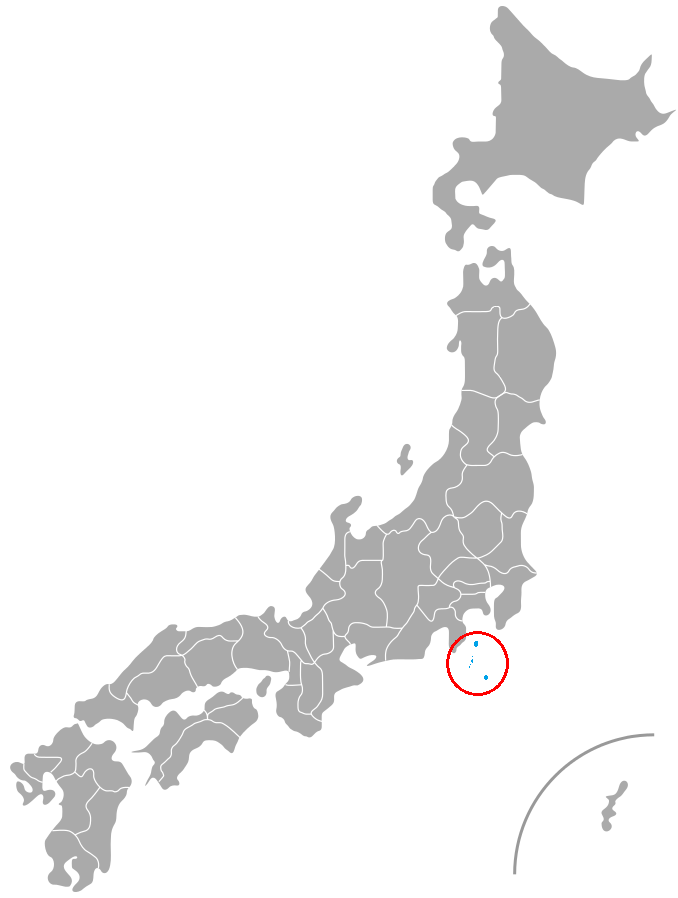
- Northern Izu Islands within Japan.
- Native to: Japan
- Region: Izu Islands, Tokyo
- Language family: Japonic: Japanese; Eastern Japanese; Kantō; Northern Izu Archipelago dialects
- Dialects: ◇ Izu Ōshima; ◇ To-shima; ◇ Nii-jima; ◇ Shikine-jima; ◇ Kōzu-shima; ◇ Miyake-jima; ◇ Mikura-jima

Language codes
- ISO 639-3: –

The Northern Izu Islands dialects (Japanese: 北部伊豆諸島方言 hokubu izu shoto hogen) is a dialect group of Japanese spoken on the northernmost collection of islands in the Izu Archipelago, Japan. The most studied of these include the To-shima, Izu Oshima and Miyake-jima dialects. These dialects have many unique traits, and can differ considerably from island to island.

== Classification ==
All Northern Izu Islands dialects are part of the Tokai-Tosan dialect group spoken across central Japan, and are most similar to the mainland, eastern Shizuoka dialect.

== General features ==
The following are general phonetic and grammatical features of the Northern Izu Archipelago dialects, with exceptions and individual variations listed in the island-specific sections.

=== Phonology ===
The Northern Izu Archipelago dialects have a chūrin (中輪 ‘middle rim’) Tokyo standard pitch accent. The vowel sound /e/ is somewhat narrower than in traditional Tokyo dialects, and may lose its distinction with /i/ to become [i]. For example:

- eki (駅 train station) → iki
- kebyō (仮病 feigning illness)→ kibyō
- fude (筆 writing brush) fudi
- tenki (天気 weather)→ tinki
- sensei (先生 teacher) → shinshē

In some dialects, there is a /tu/ syllable. For example:

- tsurizao (釣り竿 fishing rod) → tuizao

=== Grammar ===
Northern Izu Archipelago dialects are classified under Eastern Japanese, with similar grammar structures to Shizuoka and West Kantō dialects, but also with a strong influence from the traditional Yokohama dialect. As aforementioned, however, the differences from island to island can be extreme. Below are some notable grammatical traits.

- The conclusive auxiliary verb is the characteristic Eastern Japanese -da (だ).
- The connective form of u-ending Godan verbs experience small tsu (っ) insertion, whilst su-ending Godan verbs experience i-euphony. (The North Izu dialects are the furthest east this trait is found)
- Bē (べ) (or bei (べい) on To-shima) is used for persuasion and volition. -U (-う) is also used for volition.
- For reasons, -kara (から) and -node (ので) are generally used, with exceptions on To-shima and Mikura-jima (listed below).

== Izu Ōshima ==
- On Izu Ōshima, pitch accent is based on the chūrin Tokyo standard but is not identical, rather a slight variation.
- The negative verb form is [-nai stem + nai (-ない)].
- For conjecture, zura (ずら) is used.
- The plain form of verbs appears as -n (-ん). For example) kuru (来る to come)→ kun (来ん), suru (する to do)→ shin (しん), neru (寝る to sleep)→ nen (寝ん).

== Nii-jima ==
- In the older generation of Nii-jima, /e/ is lengthened.
- In the Nii-jima Honmura dialect, the phonemes /ti/ and /di/ are also observed.

== Mikura-jima ==
- The negative verb form is [-nai stem + nee (ねぇ)].
- For conjecture, danbē (だんべぇ) and darō (だろう) are used.

== Miyake-jima ==
- In Tsubota, /e/ tends to change to an [i], with a particularly strong tendency to do so on the syllables ke (け) and re (れ).
- The negative verb form is [-nai stem + nee (ねぇ) ].
- For conjecture, zura (ずら) and darō (だろう) are used.
- -nke (-んけ) is used as an equivalent to kara and node.

== To-shima ==
- The vowels in /ce/ and /co/ are pronounced close to an i and u, respectively.
- The diphthong /ei/ is not merged and is pronounced [ei], so that sensei (先生 teacher) is not sensē but sensei.
- The negative verb form [nai-stem + n (ん) ] is used.
- For conjecture, dan’nō (だんのう) and darubei (だるべい) are used.
- -ni (-に) is used as an equivalent to kara and node.
- A distinction between the attributive and plain form of verbs can be seen. The attributive form ends with -o, whilst the plain form ends with a -u when particles like bei and na (な) are attached. For assertions, the verb ends with -o. For example:
  - iru (いる to be)→ iro (いろ)
  - neru (寝る to sleep)→ nero (寝ろ)
  - suru (する to do)→ shiro (しろ)
  - shite iru (している is doing)→ shitero (してろ)
  - kaku (書く to write)→ kako (書こ).
- The Western Japanese past negative form -zatta (-ざった was not) is found.
