= Yasato, Ibaraki =

Dissolved municipality in Ibaraki prefecture, Japan

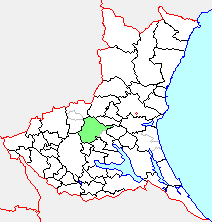
Map of Yasato, Ibaraki

Yasato (八郷町, Yasato-machi) was a town located in Niihari District, Ibaraki Prefecture, Japan.

As of 2003, the town had an estimated population of 30,218 and a density of 196.50 persons per km^{2}. The total area was 153.78 km^{2}.

On October 1, 2005, Yasato was merged into the expanded city of Ishioka.
