= Omitama =

City in Ibaraki Prefecture, Japan

Omitama 小美玉市
- City
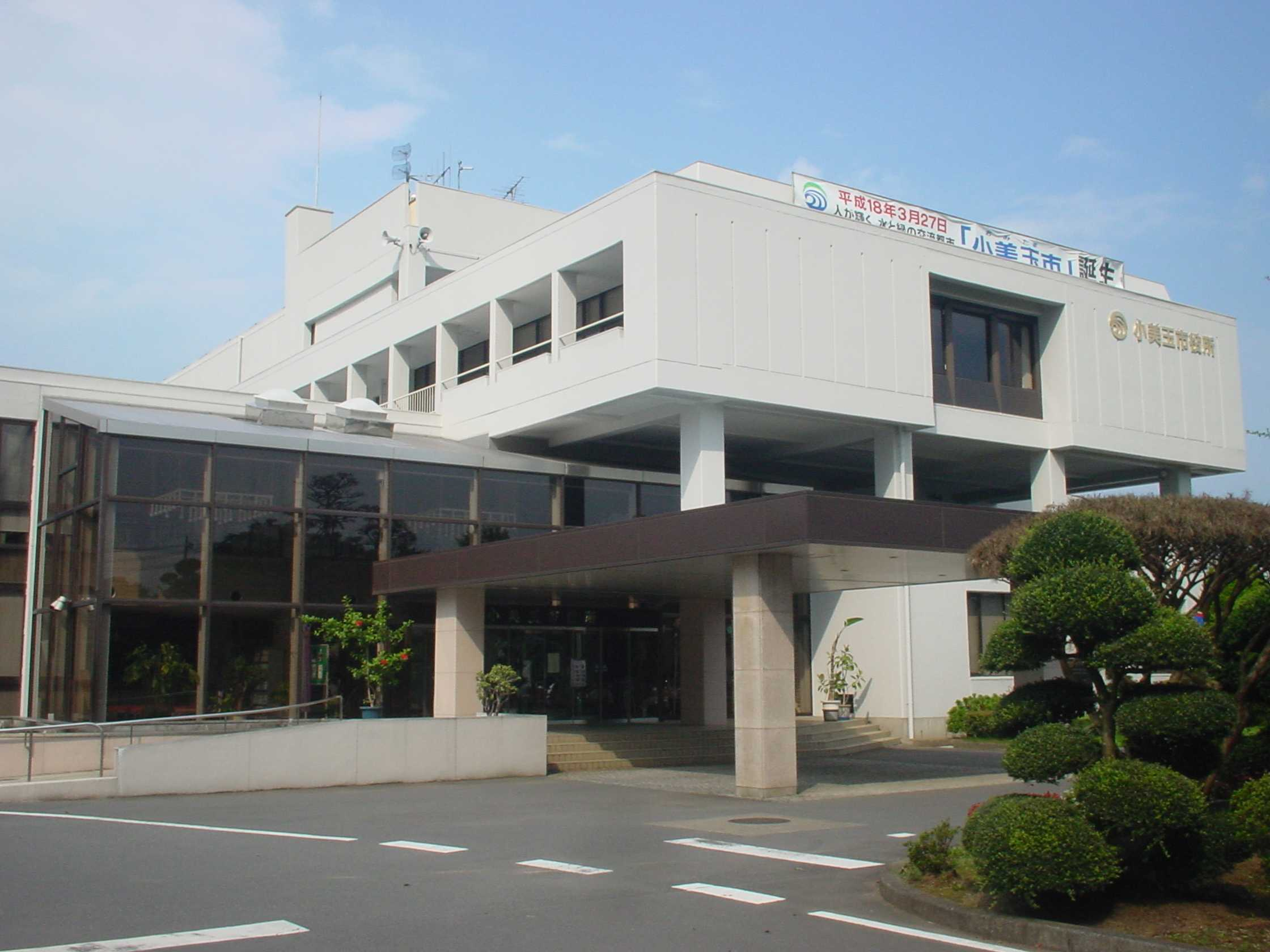
- Omitama city hall

- Flag Seal

- Location of Omitama in Ibaraki Prefecture

- Coordinates: 36°14′21.4″N 140°21′9.2″E
- Country: Japan
- Region: Kantō
- Prefecture: Ibaraki

Area
  - Total: 144.74 km^{2} (55.88 sq mi)

Population (October 2020)
  - Total: 48,754
  - Density: 336.84/km^{2} (872.41/sq mi)
- Time zone: UTC+9 (Japan Standard Time)
- Tree: Zelkova serrata
- Flower: Cosmos
- Bird: Egret
- Phone number: 0299-48-1111
- Address: 835 Katakura, Omitama-shi, Ibarak-ken 319-0192
- Website: Official website

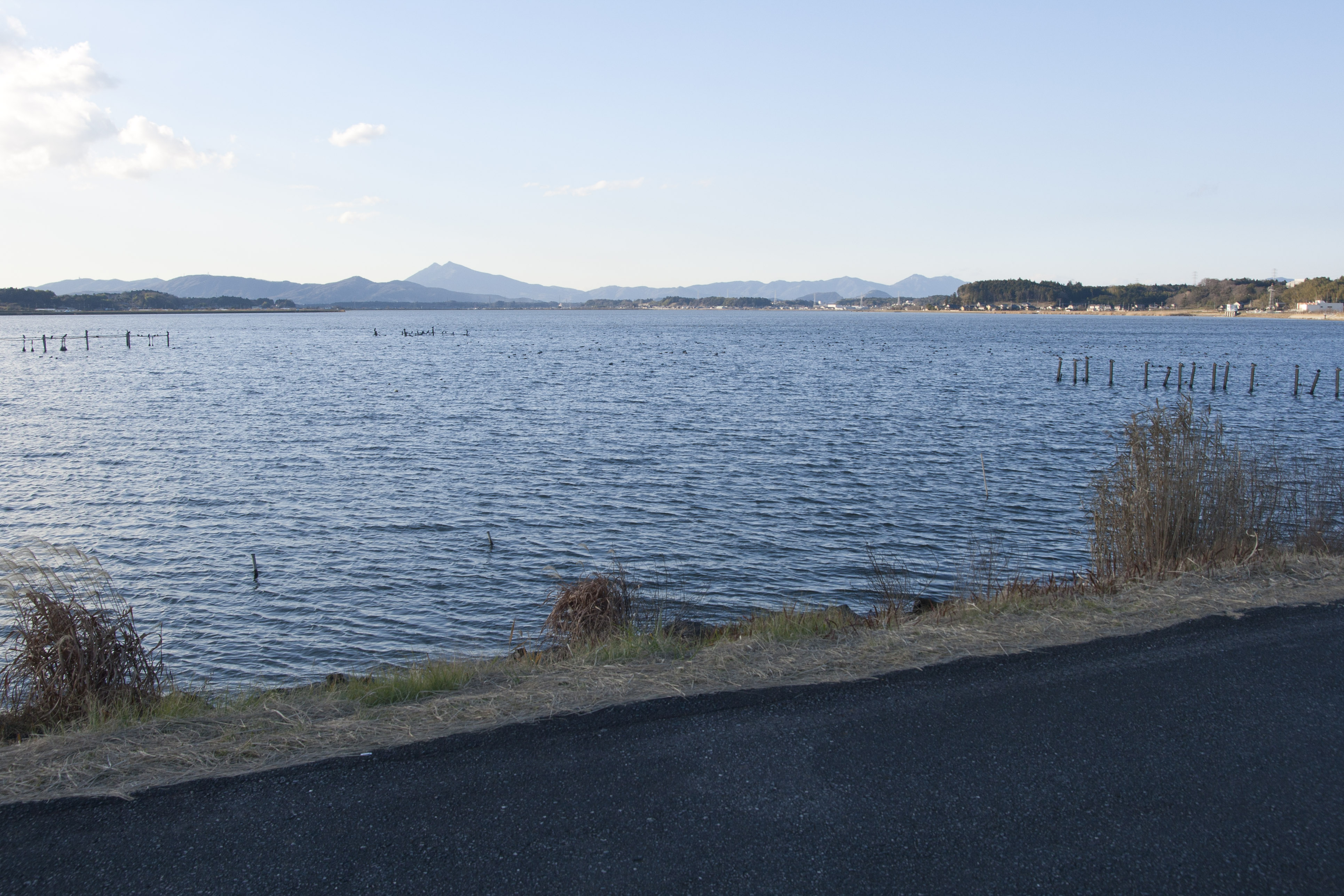
Lake Kasumigaura from Omitama

Omitama (小美玉市, Omitama-shi; Japanese pronunciation: [ò̞.mʲí.tä́.mä́(.ɕì)]) is a city located in Ibaraki Prefecture, Japan. As of 1 July 2020, the city had an estimated population of 48,776 in 18,311 households and a population density of 337 persons per km^{2}. The percentage of the population aged over 65 was 30.0%. The total area of the city is 144.74 square kilometres (55.88 sq mi).

== Geography ==
Omitama lies in central Ibaraki Prefecture on flat lowlands just north of Lake Kasumigaura. Local tourism materials promote wide lake views, seasonal flower fields, and viewpoints such as Kibogaoka Hill Park (seasonal rape blossoms and cosmos) and “Sky Station Sorara.” The city also uses the nickname “Diamond City,” referencing sunrises over Mt. Tsukuba (“Diamond Tsukuba”).

=== Surrounding municipalities ===
Ibaraki Prefecture

- Hokota
- Ibaraki
- Ishioka
- Kasama
- Namegata

=== Climate ===
Omitama has a Humid continental climate (Köppen Cfa) characterized by warm summers and cool winters with light snowfall. The average annual temperature in Omitama is 13.7 °C. The average annual rainfall is 1357 mm with September as the wettest month. The temperatures are highest on average in August, at around 25.6 °C, and lowest in January, at around 2.8 °C.

== Demographics ==
According to the national census, population peaked around 2000 and has declined since. The 2020 census recorded 48,870 residents (density ~338/km^{2}) over 144.7 km^{2}.

Historical population
Year	Pop.	±%
1920	25,143	—
1930	26,330	+4.7%
1940	28,341	+7.6%
1950	37,280	+31.5%
1960	35,675	−4.3%
1970	36,967	+3.6%
1980	48,200	+30.4%
1990	52,269	+8.4%
2000	53,406	+2.2%
2010	52,279	−2.1%
2020	48,870	−6.5%

== History ==
The city of Omitama was established on March 27, 2006, from the merger of the towns of Ogawa and Minori (both from Higashiibaraki District), and the village of Tamari (from Niihari District). The new city took its name from portions of the three older town and village names from which it was formed, Ogawa, Minori, Tamari.

== Government ==
Omitama has a mayor-council form of government with a directly elected mayor and a unicameral city council of 20 members. Omitama contributes one member to the Ibaraki Prefectural Assembly. In terms of national politics, the city is part of Ibaraki 2nd district of the lower house of the Diet of Japan.

== Economy ==
Agriculture is the mainstay of the local economy, with cash crops including chives, strawberries, melons, rice and lotus roots.

Omitama is also the home of Ibaraki Airport, which opened in March 2010 after considerable public investment. Its original intention was to attract Low Cost Carriers to an operating centre North of Tokyo. To date it has had some success by attracting Skymark Airlines, Spring Airlines and TigerAir to offer limited domestic and international routes to Xian, Taipei and Shanghai.

== Roads ==
Jōban Expressway (Minori PA), National Route 6, National Route 355 serve the city.

== Education ==
Omitama administers 11 public elementary and 4 public junior high schools; there is one prefectural public high school. (General school-system context for foreign residents is provided by the Ibaraki International Association.)

== Transportation ==
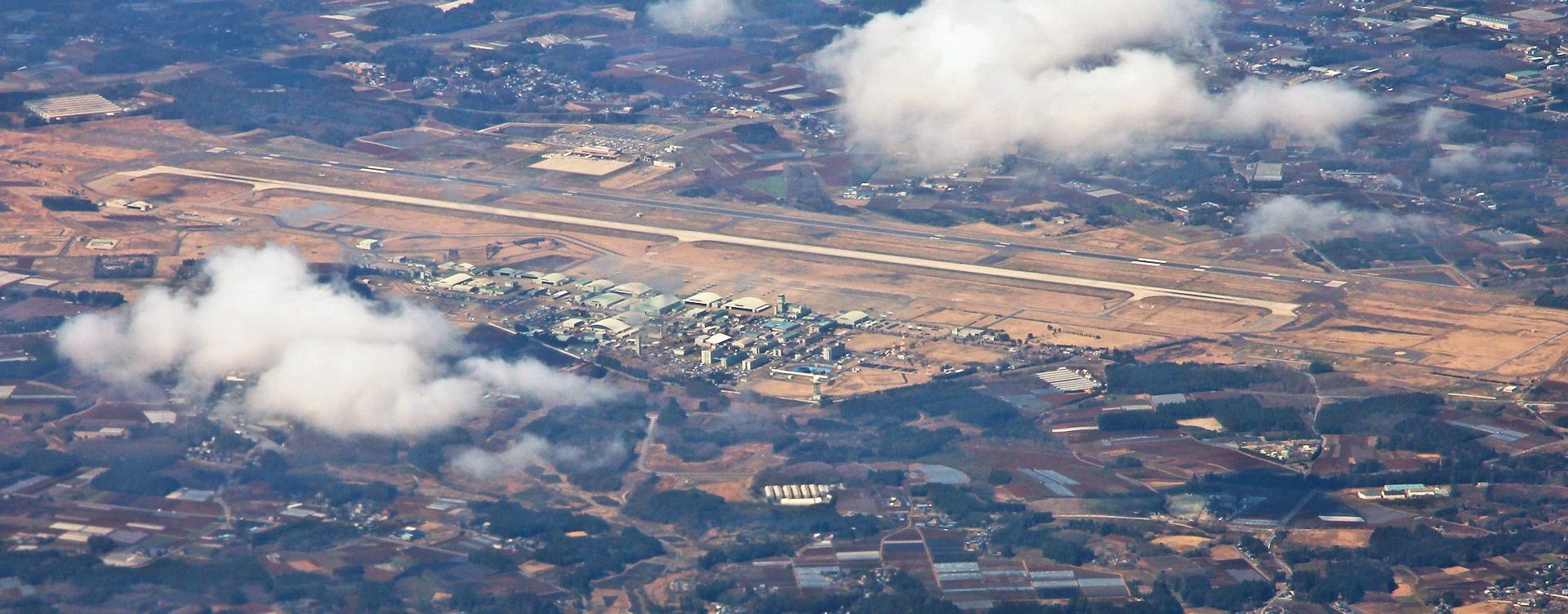
Aerial view of Ibaraki Airport

=== Railway ===
JR East – Jōban Line

- Hatori

=== Highway ===
- Jōban Expressway – Minori Parking Area
- National Route 6
- National Route 355

=== Airport ===
- Ibaraki Airport

== Military facilities ==
Hyakuri Air Base (JASDF) shares airfield facilities with Ibaraki Airport. It is home to the 7th Air Wing under the Central Air Defense Force, including the 3rd Tactical Fighter Squadron operating Mitsubishi F-2s and T-4 trainers. Hyakuri regularly hosts the annual Hyakuri Air Festival (Blue Impulse appearances noted), drawing large crowds.

== Sister Cities ==
- Abilene, Kansas, United States — Sister-city ties began in 1984 with then-Minori; exchanges continue via a city board in Abilene.

== Culture and Tourism ==
Local sites and experiences promoted by the city/airport region guide include:

- Kibogaoka Hill Park (ripe blossoms in spring; cosmos in autumn).
- Lake Kasumigaura shoreline views and New Year's “first sunrise” events; seasonal “Diamond Tsukuba” sunrise alignment.
- Soga Jinja (Gion Festival with ~500-year history; popular goshuin/seal designs).
- Sky Station Sorara viewpoint.
- Akane Farm (farm-to-table dining) and local confections like “Minoriz” baumkuchen.

== Noted people from Omitama ==
- Yuya Niwa - Politician, former Minister of Health.
