= Akimasa Ishikawa =

Japanese politician

- 石川 昭政
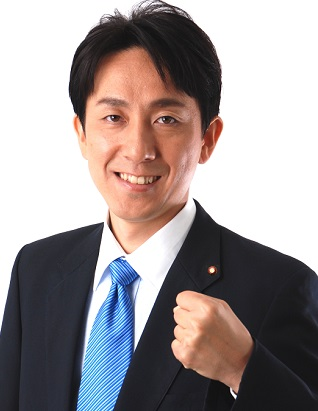
- Official portrait, 2011

Member of the House of Representatives; from Northern Kanto
- Incumbent
- Assumed office 8 February 2026
- Constituency: PR block
- In office 16 December 2012 – 9 October 2024
- Constituency: PR block (2012–2017); Ibaraki 5th (2017–2021); PR block (2021–2024)

Personal details
- Born: 18 September 1972 (age 54) Hitachi, Ibaraki, Japan
- Party: Liberal Democratic
- Education: Kokugakuin University

Akimasa Ishikawa is a Japanese politician who is serving as a member of the House of Representatives.

== Biography ==
He graduated from Kokugakuin University and served as a state Minister for Digital Transformation.
