= Niihari, Ibaraki =

Dissolved municipality in Ibaraki prefecture, Japan

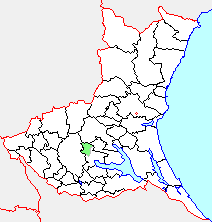
Map of Niihari, Ibaraki

Niihari (新治村, Niihari-mura) was a village located in Niihari District, Ibaraki Prefecture, Japan.

As of May 1, 2005, the village had an estimated population of 9,404 and a population density of 293.96 persons per km^{2}. The total area was 31.99 km^{2}.

On February 20, 2006, Niihari was merged into the expanded city of Tsuchiura.
