= Asahi, Ibaraki =

Dissolved municipality in Kashima district, Ibaraki prefecture, Japan

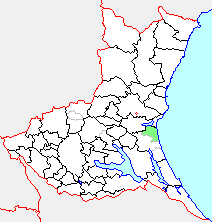
Map of Asahi, Ibaraki

Asahi (旭村, Asahi-mura) was a village located in Kashima District, Ibaraki Prefecture, Japan.

As of 2003, the village had an estimated population of 11,825 and a density of 219.80 persons per km^{2}. The total area was 53.80 km^{2}.

On October 11, 2005, Asahi, along with the former town of Hokota, and the village of Taiyō (all from Kashima District), was merged to create the city of Hokota.
