= Gozenyama, Ibaraki =

Dissolved municipality in Ibaraki prefecture, Japan

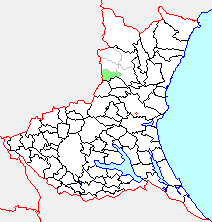
Map of Gozenyama, Ibaraki

Gozen'yama (御前山村, Gozen'yama-mura) was a village located in Higashiibaraki District, Ibaraki Prefecture, Japan.

On October 16, 2004, Gozenyama, along with the town of Yamagata (also from Higashiibaraki District), the town of Ōmiya, and the villages of Miwa and Ogawa (all from Naka District), was merged to create the city of Hitachiōmiya and no longer exists as an independent municipality.

As of 2003, the village had an estimated population of 4,319 and a density of 97.30 persons per km^{2}. The total area was 44.39 km^{2}.
