= Tamari, Ibaraki =

Dissolved municipality in Ibaraki prefecture, Japan

Tamari (玉里村, Tamari-mura) was a village located in Niihari District, Ibaraki Prefecture, Japan.

As of 2003, the village had an estimated population of 8,618 and a density of 588.26 persons per km^{2}. The total area was 15.33 km^{2}.

On March 27, 2006, Tamari, along with the towns of Ogawa and Minori (both from Higashiibaraki District), was merged to create the city of Omitama. The new city takes its name from a merger of the three older town names, Ogawa, MInori, TAMAri.

The village had a large agricultural base, with rice and renkon (lotus roots) being the main crops.
