= Jōhoku, Ibaraki =

Dissolved municipality in Ibaraki prefecture, Japan

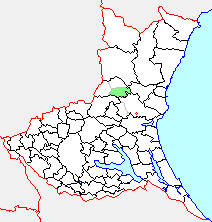
Map of Jōhoku, Ibaraki

Jōhoku (常北町, Jōhoku-machi) was a town located in Higashiibaraki District, Ibaraki Prefecture, Japan.

On February 1, 2005, Jōhoku, along with the village of Katsura (also from Higashiibaraki District), and the village of Nanakai (from Nishiibaraki District), was merged to create the town of Shirosato and no longer exists as an independent municipality.

As of 2003, the town had an estimated population of 13,575 and a density of 259.26 persons per km^{2}. The total area was 52.36 km^{2}.
