= Akeno, Ibaraki =

Dissolved municipality in Ibaraki Prefecture, Japan

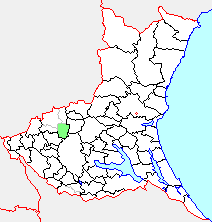
Map of Akeno, Ibaraki

Akeno (明野町, Akeno-machi) was a town located in Makabe District, Ibaraki Prefecture, Japan.

As of 2003, the town had an estimated population of 17,377 and a density of 359.40 persons per km^{2}. The total area was 48.35 km^{2}.

On March 28, 2005, Akeno, along with the city of Shimodate, the towns of Kyōwa and Sekijō (all from Makabe District) was merged to create the city of Chikusei and no longer exists as an independent municipality.

The area previously known as Akeno has five Elementary schools (Murata, Omura, Nagasa, Toba and Ueno), one Junior high school and one High School. Points of interest include the local Genkikan, a flower park, and nearby Mount Tsukuba.
