= Shimodate =

Dissolved municipality in Ibaraki Prefecture, Japan

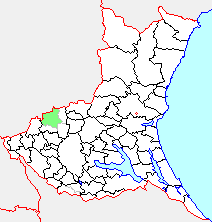
Map of Shimodate, Ibaraki

Shimodate (下館市, Shimodate-shi) was a city located in Ibaraki Prefecture, Japan.

As of 2003, the city had an estimated population of 64,467 and the density of 747.44 persons per km^{2}. The total area was 86.25 km^{2}.

On March 28, 2005, Shimodate, along with the towns of Akeno, Kyōwa and Sekijō (all from Makabe District) was merged to create the city of Chikusei and no longer exists as an independent municipality.

The city was founded on March 15, 1954, centered on Shimodate Station on the JR Mito Line. It is also the southern terminus of the Mooka Line (ex-JR, transferred to private ownership 1988) and the northern terminus of the Kanto Railway Jōsō Line.
