= Kanagawa dialect =

Japanese dialect of Kanagawa

Kanagawa dialects
- 神奈川県方言
- Kanagawa dialects area.
- Native to: Japan
- Region: Kanagawa
- Language family: Japonic: Japanese; Eastern Japanese; Kantō; Western; Kanagawa dialects
- Dialects: Northern; Sagami River East; Sagami River West; Sagami Bay

Language codes
- ISO 639-3: –
- Glottolog: kana1290

The Kanagawa dialect (Japanese: 神奈川方言 kanagawa-ken hōgen) is the term used to describe the Japanese dialects spoken in Kanagawa Prefecture. As there is no single unified dialect throughout the prefecture, it is a collective term, with some of the regional dialects spoken including: the Sōshū dialect (used for areas that were formerly part of Sagami Province), the Yokohama dialect, the Hadano dialect and Shōnan dialect, among others.

== Outline ==
The Kanagawa dialect, along with other dialects such as the Gunma, Saitama and Tama dialects, make up the wider West Kantō dialect. It is sometimes considered difficult to identify a dialect that is strictly unique to Kanagawa. This is due, in part, to its close similarity to other West Kanto dialects, particularly in areas that border other prefectures. For example, the southern Ashigara area shares features with east Shizuoka dialects, whilst the western part of the former Tsukui District, located in the far northwest of Kanagawa, possesses similarities with the Gunnai dialect of eastern Yamanashi Prefecture. Parts of the north of the prefecture that are proximate to the Tama Region of Tokyo or the more metropolitan special wards of Tokyo, share numerous traits with the dialects of these respective areas. Like many other parts of Japan, traditional dialects in Kanagawa are declining under the influence of standard Japanese. Owing to its proximity to Tokyo, this trend is even more notable in Kanagawa, especially in northern urban areas, such as Kawasaki, Sagamihara and Yokohama.

== Regional variation ==
There is some general similarity in dialects spoken across the prefecture, with noticeable homogeny in phonology and pitch accent. There are greater recognised differences in grammar and vocabulary, however. Regionally, the largest differences are found in geographically separated areas, such as north and south of the Tanzawa Mountains or east and west of the Sagami River. In the case of the Sagami River, a notable exception is at its estuary (around Hiratsuka and Chigasaki) where areas on opposite banks have been connected historically via the Tōkaidō, leading to relatively fewer dialectal differences between them. Aside from north/south and east/west differences, there is notable variation in the Sagami Bay coastal area (also known as Shōnan), Miura Peninsula and the Ashigara region.

Below are the dialect sub-divisions proposed in 1961 by Sukezumi Hino. (Kawasaki and most of Yokohama were treated separately as a ‘Tokyo/Yokohama dialect’).

- Northern - Tsukui District, Aiko District (north of Miyagase).
- Southern
  - Sagami River East
    - Sagamihara, Yamato, Kōza District, western part of Kotsuka Ward in Yokohama).
    - Miura Peninsula (parts of Miura District, Yokosuka, Miura City).
  - Sagami River West
    - Aiko District (south of Susugaya), Atsugi, Hadano, Hiratsuka, Naka District.
    - Ashigarakami District, Ashigarashimo District, Odawara.
  - Sagami Bay Coastal Dialect - Fujisawa, Chigasaki, Kamakura, Zushi, Miura Peninsula Sagami Bay area.

== Phonology ==
Phonology is typical for a West Kanto dialect, but less common traits exist in some areas.

=== Pronunciation ===
- There is a strong tendency among speakers to merge the vowel sound ai (あい) to ē (えぇ). (For example: butai (ぶたい stage) → butē (ぶてぇ), kitai (きたい expectation) → kitē (きてぇ), omae (おまえ you) → omē (おめぇ).
  - In some areas, most notably Ashigara and Tsukui, ai may become yā (やぁ) instead (a shared trait with Shizuoka and Yamanashi dialects). (For example: kaeru (かえる frog) → kyāru (きゃーる).
- k- starting mora that lie within a word may become voiced. (For example: iku (いく to go) → igu (いぐ).
- r-starting mora may become n (ん) in certain situations. (For example: wakaranai (わからない I don't know) → wakannē (わかんねぇ), aru kara (あるから because it's there) → an kara (あんから)
- Along the Sagami Bay coastal area and on the Miura Peninsula, the phonemes je (じぇ) and she (しぇ) are sometimes used.

=== Pitch accent ===
Generally, the prefecture has the Tokyo-standard pitch accent, although some deviation is found west of the Sagami River, where ‘three-beat’ nouns such as a-sa-hi (あさひ morning sun) that are usually front-mora stressed in standard Japanese may become middle-mora stressed (a-sa-hi → a-sa-hi ). There are also some examples of words that have an accent in standard Japanese becoming non-accented. This ‘non-accenting’ has also recently been observed in the Tokyo Metropolitan Area. Below are some examples of words that do not have a pitch accent in some Kanagawa dialects (stress is indicated by bold).

Standard Japanese		Kanagawa
o-kyaku sama �(おきゃくさま customer)	→	o-kyaku sama �(おきゃくさま)
seito (せいと students)	→	seito (せいと)
jugyō (じゅぎょう lesson)	→	jugyō (じゅぎょう)
tamago (たまご)	→	tamago (たまご)

== Grammar ==
The particle be (べ) and its related expressions da be (だべ) and danbe (だんべ) are commonly used in Kanagawa. However, unlike other Kanto dialects the ending e (ぇ) sound is not lengthened, and in some areas (such as Hadano) these particles may lose their b- sound to become e (え) and da e (だえ). Kanagawa-native Masahiro Nakai (a member of the Japanese idol group SMAP) as well as the talent Thane Camus, both of whom hail from Fujisawa City, are known for often using these phrases. Particularly in the Shōnan area, yo (よ) is often attached to be to form be yo (べよ). For example:

- sakki kara, sou itteru jan (さっきからそう言ってるじゃん I've been saying that since earlier) (said somewhere like Yokohama) would become sakki kara, sou itten-be yo (さっきからそう言ってんべよ) in the Shōnan area.

Other sentence-ending particles common in Kanto dialects such as ne (ね) and sa (さ) are also widely used. In comparison with the Tokyo area, however, these particles are often lengthened (nē (ねぇ), sā (さぁ), yō (よ ぉ) and have an atypical intonation. Due to sometimes being perceived as rude or improper, some schools have encouraged students to avoid using these particles. Like many other Kantō dialects, polite speech is seldom used in Kanagawa dialects. The word kudasai (ください please) has multiple regional variants in Kanagawa. North of the Tanzawa Mountains it can become kunro (くんろ), whilst south of the mountains is may be said as kēro (けぇろ), kenro (けんろ) or kunna (くんな). In Shōnan, it is sometimes said as sē (せぇ), sassē (さっせぇ) and rassē (らっせぇ) (expressions shared with the coastal areas of the Izu Peninsula). West of the Sagami River, the question-indicating sentence-ending particle ke (け) is sometimes used, and the adverb bakari (ばかり full of, only) may become simply bē (べぇ). For example:

- sake bakari nonja dame deshō (酒ばかり飲んじゃだめでしょう You shouldn't just drink alcohol) in standard Japanese becomes sake bē nonja dame da be (酒べぇ飲んじゃだめだべ) west of the Sagami River.

The adversative conjunction kedo (けど but) can be said as kendo (けんど), and in parts of Ashigara and Tsukui, the conjecture-indicating particle zura (ずら) may be used. For example:

- sō darō (そうだろう that's right, isn't it?) becomes sō zura (そうずら).

Other notable grammatical and conversational features include:

- The vigorous repetition of the name of an object that one is showing to someone else.
- Responding to the phrase shitte iru ka? (知っているか? Do you know (it )?) with shitte nē (知ってねぇ I don't know it (present continuous negative)) instead of shiranai (知らない (present negative)) as is common in standard Japanese.

=== jan (ka) ・ じゃん(か) ===
The expression jan(ka) is a common expression in Yokohama and other parts of Kanagawa. It became frequently used from the Shōwa Era onwards, with presumed etymological origins in sō ja, an ka (dialectal variation of sonna koto ga aru ka (そんなことがあるのか Is there such a thing?) as shown below.

- sō ja↔an ka → sō jan ka.

It is thought to have been introduced to Kanagawa via the Tōkaidō, Kōshū Kaidō or Silk Road originally out of Aichi Prefecture, where it is believed to have roots in the Mikawa dialect. In parts of the Miura Peninsula, jē (じぇえ) and jen (じぇん) are sometimes used instead.

== Vocabulary ==
The table below shows some examples of different vocabulary between Kanagawa dialects (specifically the Hadano dialect) and standard Japanese.

English	Standard Japanese	Hadano (Kanagawa)
Throw away	suteru (捨てる)	uccharu (うっちゃる)
Push	osu (押す)	oppesu (おっぺす)
Talk / chat	shaberu (しゃべる)	kucchaberu (くっちゃべる)
Cold (to the touch)	tsumetai (冷たい)	shakkoi (しゃっこい)
Destroy (completely)	bukkowasu (ぶっ壊す)	bokkosu (ぼっこす)
Last night	yuube (昨夜)	yunbe (ゆんべ)
