= Tochigi dialect =

Japanese dialect of the Tochigi prefecture

- 栃木弁
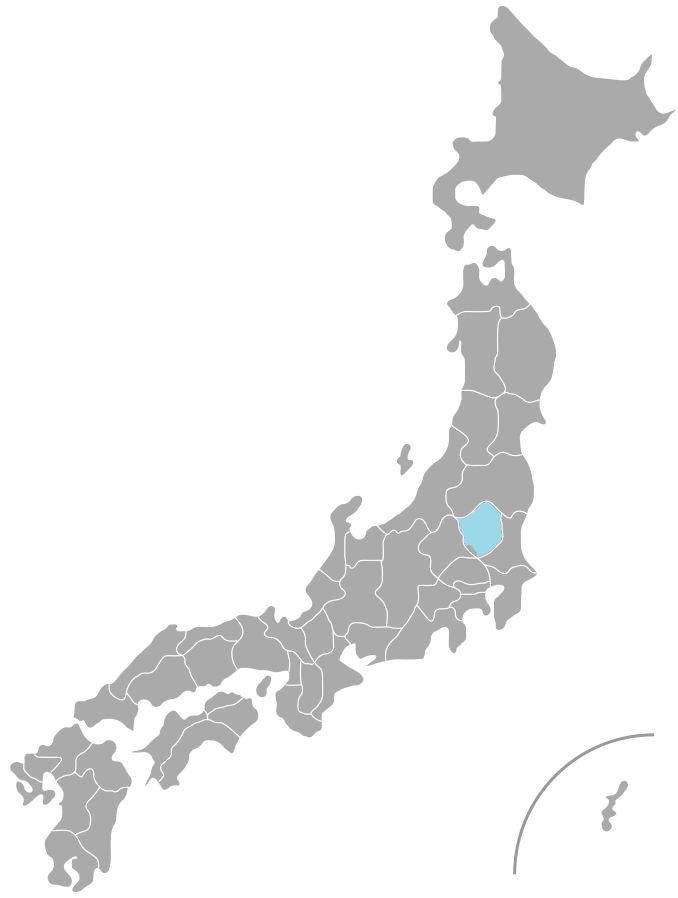
- Tochigi dialect area.
- Native to: Japan
- Region: Tochigi (excluding Ashikaga)
- Language family: Japonic: Japanese; Eastern Japanese; Kantō?; Eastern?; Tochigi dialect

Language codes
- ISO 639-3: –
- Glottolog: toch1258

The Tochigi dialect (Japanese: 栃木弁 Tochigi-ben) is a Japanese dialect spoken in Tochigi prefecture. It is classified along with the Ibaraki dialect as an East Kanto dialect, but due to possessing various shared phonological and grammatical features with the neighbouring Fukushima dialect to the north, many scholars consider it instead as part of the wider Tohoku dialect. It has notable differences within the prefecture depending on region, and in some parts of the southwest of the prefecture (including the cities of Ashikaga and Sano) a separate dialect, the Ashikaga dialect, is spoken.

== Phonology ==
The following are some of the most distinct phonetic characteristics of the dialect.

- Excluding the area around Ashikaga City, pitch accent is notably absent from virtually all regions in Tochigi. Rising intonation is also commonly heard.
- There is a reduced distinction between いi and えe sounds. For example, iro-enpitsu (いろえんぴつ coloured pencil ) may become either iro-inpitsu (いろいんぴつ)、ero-inpitsu (えろいんぴつ) or ero-enpitsu (えろえんぴつ).
- When located between two vowel sounds, k-, t- and ch- sounds become voiced (k → g, t → d and ch → j (shown in the following table)). Voicing does not occur when the sounds follow a small っ tsu or んn, or when the surrounding vowels are unvoiced.

Consonant voicing
Sound		Examples	
Sound in standard Japanese	Tochigi dialect form	Standard Japanese	Tochigi dialect
k	g	aki (あき autumn )	agi (あぎ)
t	d	katana (かたな sword)	kadana (かだな)

- When located between a vowel and an unvoiced consonant, じji, ずzu, びbi and ぶbu sounds become unvoiced.
- Certain contracted sounds lose their contracted element. For example, ぎゅgyu → ぎgi and しゅshu → しshi. Additionally, the sound ゆyu can become いi or えe. For example, yuki (ゆき snow )→ iki (いき), yubi (ゆび finger )→ ibi (いび) or ebi (えび), although elderly speakers in Haga District pronounce yu as りri instead

== Grammar ==
The following are some of the most distinct grammatical characteristics of the dialect.

- うu verbs ending with -あう-au lose their u sound. For example, kau (かう to buy ) → ka (か).
- Predominantly in the north of the prefecture, the verb shinu (しぬ to die ) can become shigu (しぐ) or shimu (しむ). Although shimu is sometimes heard in the south of the prefecture, shigu is absent.
- In regions north of Tochigi City and Ōyama City, the directional particle さsa can be used (equivalent to にni or へhe in standard Japanese). In the south of the prefecture, the particle げge can be used to show the target of an action (をwo in standard Japanese).
- There is a tendency to insert small っtsu sounds between free-standing and ancillary words.
- Politeness is very rarely shown through changing of word form, but rather with gestures, behaviour and nuance in the use of language. Although it is generally uncommon for speakers to use set polite expressions in eastern Japanese dialects (although some like the Tōkyō, Morioka and Sendai dialects have developed their own), in Tochigi and Ibaraki this tendency is even more striking.
