= Hasaki, Ibaraki =

Dissolved municipality in Ibaraki prefecture, Japan

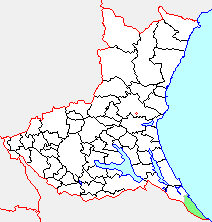
Map of Hasaki, Ibaraki

Hasaki (波崎町, Hasaki-machi) was a town in Kashima District, Ibaraki Prefecture, Japan.

As of 2003, the town had an estimated population of 38,983 and a density of 570.93 persons per km^{2}. The total area is 68.28 km^{2}.

On August 1, 2005, Hasaki, along with the old town of Kamisu (also from Kashima District), was merged to create the city of Kamisu and no longer exists as an independent municipality.
