= Urizura, Ibaraki =

Dissolved municipality in Ibaraki prefecture, Japan

Coordinates: 36°30′N 140°27′E

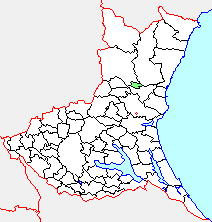
Map of Urizura, Ibaraki

Urizura (瓜連町, Urizura-machi) was a town located in Naka District, Ibaraki Prefecture, Japan.

As of 2003, the town had an estimated population of 8,851 and a density of 603.75 persons per km^{2}. The total area was 14.66 km^{2}.

On January 21, 2005, Urizura, along with the town of Naka (also from Naka District) was merged to create the city of Naka and no longer exists as an independent municipality.
