= Sekijō =

Dissolved municipality in Ibaraki Prefecture, Japan

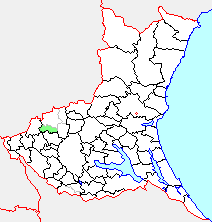
Map of Sekijō, Ibaraki

Sekijō (関城町, Sekijō-machi) was a town located in Makabe District, Ibaraki Prefecture, Japan.

As of 2003, the town had an estimated population of 15,961 and a density of 462.50 persons per km^{2}. The total area was 34.51 km^{2}.

On March 28, 2005, Sekijō, along with the city of Shimodate, the towns of Akeno and Kyōwa (all from Makabe District) was merged to create the city of Chikusei and no longer exists as an independent municipality.
