= Iwase, Ibaraki =

Dissolved municipality in Ibaraki Prefecture, Japan

Coordinates: 36.350°N 140.100°E

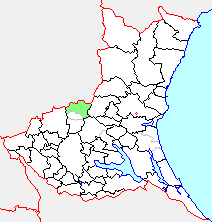
Map of Iwase, Ibaraki

Iwase (岩瀬町, Iwase-machi) was a town located in Nishiibaraki District, Ibaraki Prefecture, Japan.

In 2003, the town had an estimated population of 22,378 and a density of 256.75 per km^{2}. The total area was 87.16 km^{2}.

On October 1, 2005, Iwase, the town of Makabe and the village of Yamato (both from Makabe District) were merged to create the city of Sakuragawa.
