= Shirosato =

Shirosato 城里町
- Town
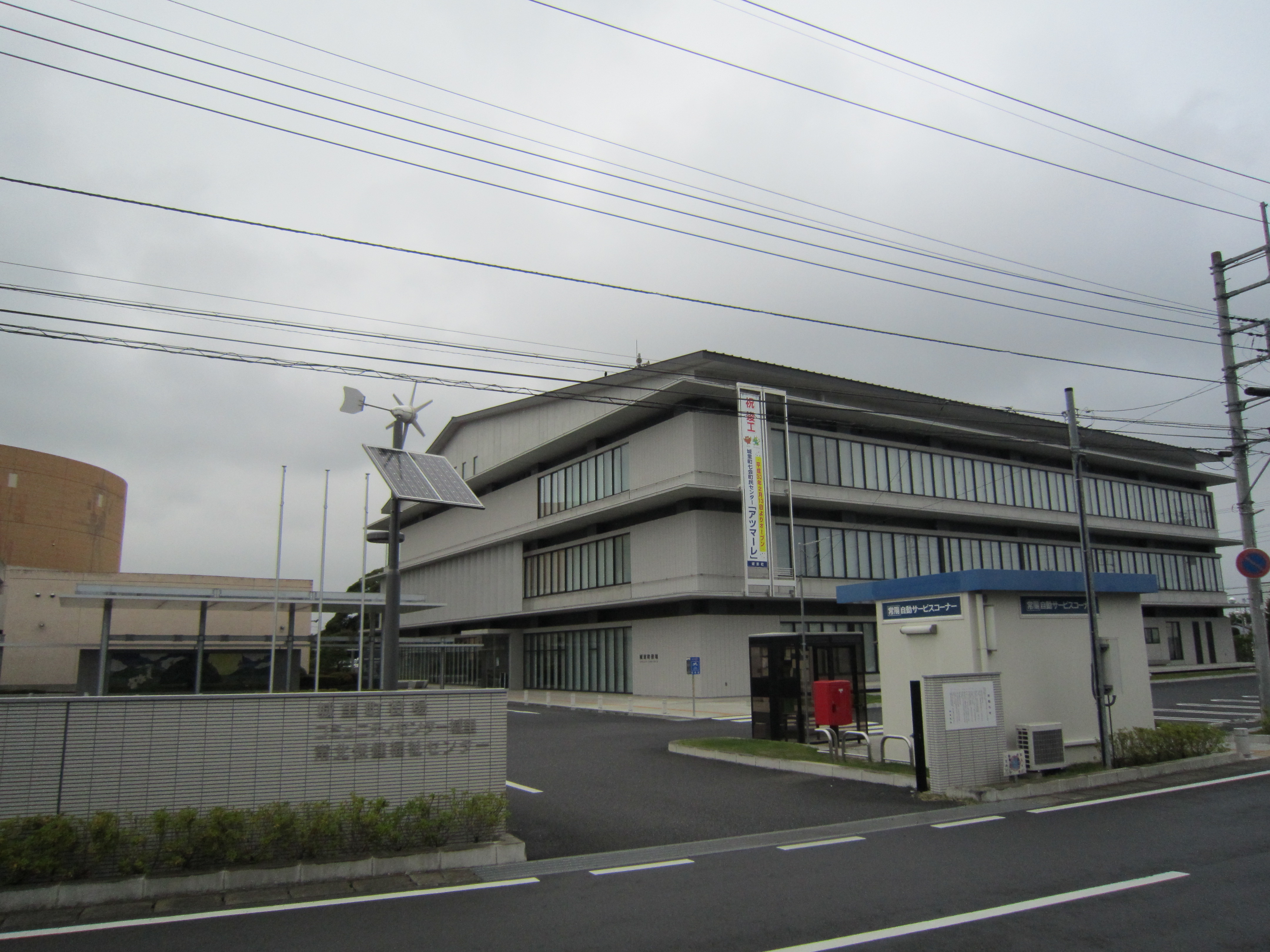
- Shirosato town hall

- Flag Seal

- Location of Shirosato in Ibaraki Prefecture

- Coordinates: 36°28′45.2″N 140°22′34.4″E
- Country: Japan
- Region: Kantō
- Prefecture: Ibaraki
- District: Higashiibaraki
- Ishizuka villadge settled: April 1, 1889
- Ishizuka town settles: October 1, 1919
- Shirosato town settled: April 1, 2005

Government
  - Mayor: Osamu Kamitōno (上遠野修) - from September 2014

Area
  - Total: 161.80 km^{2} (62.47 sq mi)

Population (September 2020)
  - Total: 18,044
  - Density: 111.52/km^{2} (288.84/sq mi)
- Time zone: UTC+9 (Japan Standard Time)
- Tree: Castanopsis sieboldii
- Flower: Lilium auratum
- Bird: Japanese bush warbler
- Phone number: 029-288-3111
- Address: 1428-25 Ishizuka, Shirosato-machi, Higashiibaraki-gun, Ibaraki-ken 311-4391
- Website: Official website

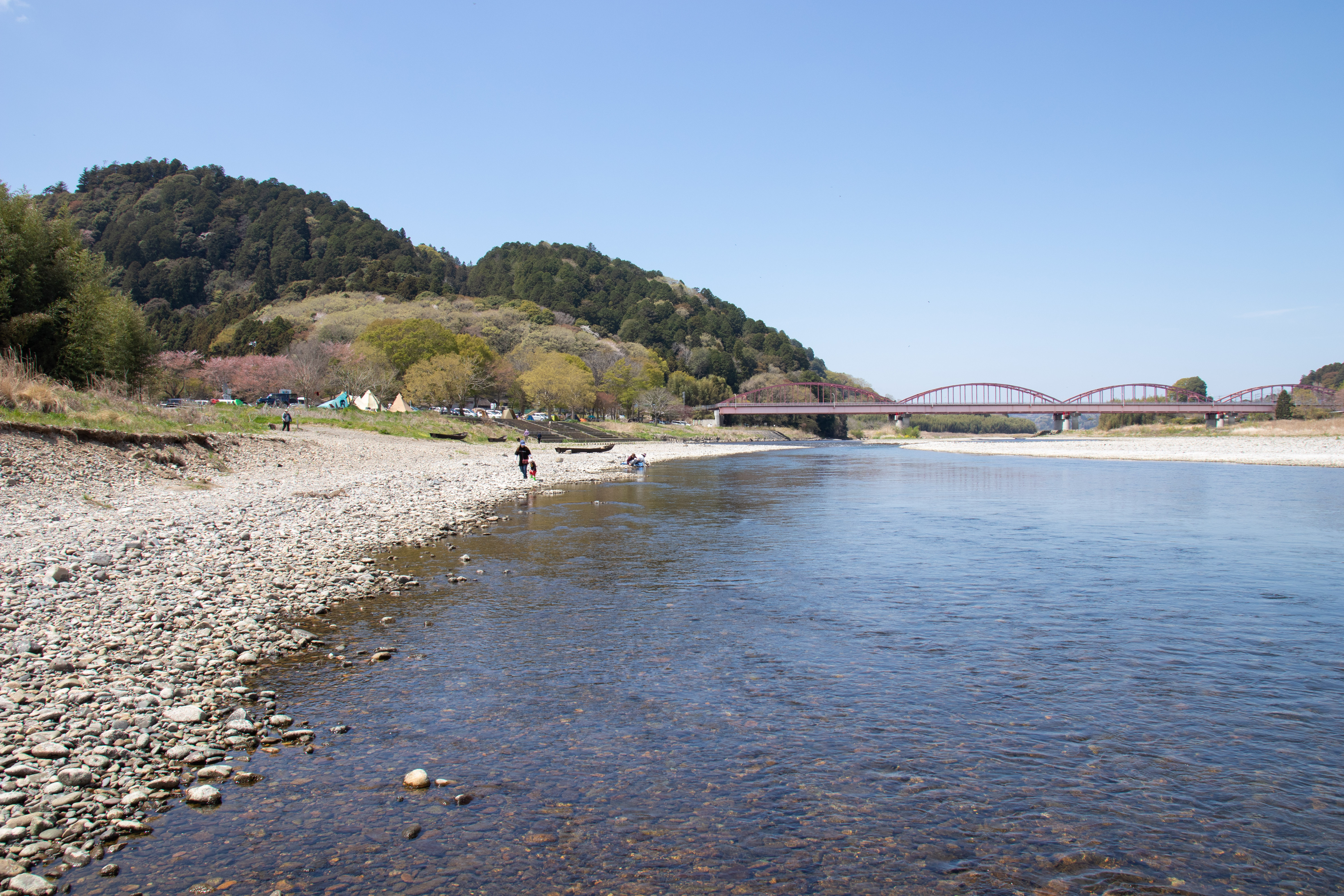
Naka River

Shirosato (城里町, Shirosato-machi) is a town located in Ibaraki Prefecture, Japan. As of 1 July 2020, the town had an estimated population of 18,128 in 7214 households and a population density of 112 persons per km^{2}. The percentage of the population aged over 65 was 37.6%. The total area of the town is 161.80 square kilometres (62.47 sq mi).

== Geography ==
Located in central-west Ibaraki Prefecture, Shinsato is bordered by Tochigi Prefecture to the west. The Naka River passes through the town.

=== Surrounding municipalities ===
Ibaraki Prefecture

- Hitachiōmiya
- Kasama
- Mito
- Naka

Tochigi Prefecture

- Motegi

=== Climate ===
Shirosato has a Humid continental climate (Köppen Cfa) characterized by warm summers and cold winters with heavy snowfall. The average annual temperature in Shirosato is 13.6 °C. The average annual rainfall is 1390 mm with September as the wettest month. The temperatures are highest on average in August, at around 25.2 °C, and lowest in January, at around 2.8 °C.

== Demographics ==
Per Japanese census data, the population of Shirosato has declined in recent decades.

Historical population
Year	Pop.	±%
1920	19,684	—
1930	21,052	+6.9%
1940	21,228	+0.8%
1950	28,010	+31.9%
1960	24,646	−12.0%
1970	21,176	−14.1%
1980	20,461	−3.4%
1990	20,721	+1.3%
2000	23,007	+11.0%
2010	21,491	−6.6%
2020	18,097	−15.8%

== History ==
Shirosato was formed on February 1, 2005, from the merger of the town of Jōhoku, the village of Katsura, both from Higashiibaraki District, and the village of Nanakai, from Nishiibaraki District.

== Government ==
Shirosato has a mayor-council form of government with a directly elected mayor and a unicameral town council of 14 members. Shirosato, together with city of Mito, contributes seven members to the Ibaraki Prefectural Assembly. In terms of national politics, the city is part of Ibaraki 1st district of the lower house of the Diet of Japan.

== Economy ==
The economy of Shirosato is primarily agricultural.

== Education ==
Shirosato has five public elementary schools and two public middle schools operated by the town government, and one public high school operated by the Ibaraki Prefectural Board of Education.

== Transportation ==
=== Railway ===
- Shirosato does not have any passenger train service.

=== Highway ===
- National Route 123

== Noted people from Shirosato ==
- Akihiro Ohata, politician
