= Chiyoda, Chiyoda, Tokyo =

City district in Japan

Chiyoda 千代田
- District
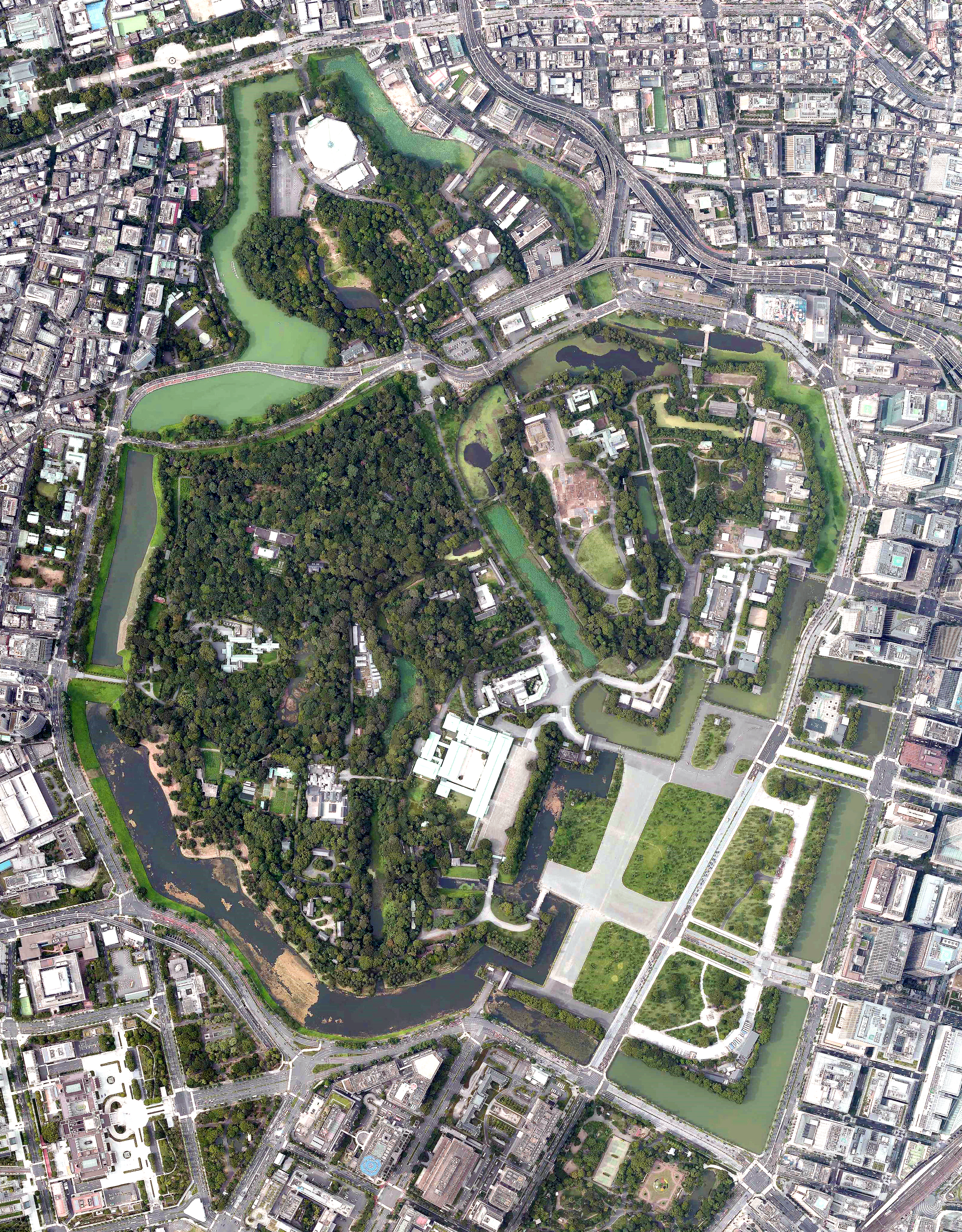
- An aerial photograph of Imperial Palace of Japan. (Kohkyo) in Chiyoda-ku, Tokyo, Japan.
- Interactive map of Chiyoda
- Coordinates: 35°41′1.8″N 139°45′14.3″E
- Country: Japan
- City: Tokyo
- Ward: Chiyoda
- Area: Kōjimachi Area

Population (June 1, 2020)
  - Total: 119
- Time zone: UTC+9 (JST)
- Postal code: 100-0001
- Area code: 03

Chiyoda (千代田, Chiyoda; lit. 'field of a thousand generations') is a district of Chiyoda City, Tokyo, Japan.

Chiyoda covers the grounds of the Imperial Palace, and nothing else. It has no subdivisions or chōme (丁目). The address of the palace itself and of the Imperial Household Agency is Chiyoda 1-1, the Hospital of the Imperial Household Chiyoda 1-2, the Imperial Guard Headquarters Chiyoda 1-3.

Its small population consists of Imperial guards and dependents. The Imperial family itself is not included in the registered population.

== Education ==
Chiyoda Board of Education operates public elementary and junior high schools. Kōjimachi Elementary School (千代田区立麹町小学校) is the zoned elementary of Chiyoda district. There is a freedom of choice system for junior high schools in Chiyoda Ward, and so there are no specific junior high school zones.
