= Minori, Ibaraki =

Dissolved municipality in Ibaraki prefecture, Japan

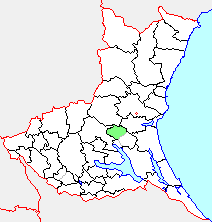
Map of Minori, Ibaraki

Minori (美野里町, Minori-machi) was a town located in Higashiibaraki District, Ibaraki Prefecture, Japan.

As of 2003, the town had an estimated population of 25,479 and a density of 411.62 persons per km^{2}. The total area was 61.90 km^{2}.

On March 27, 2006, Minori, along with the town of Ogawa (also from Higashiibaraki District), and the village of Tamari (from Niihari District), was merged to create the city of Omitama.
