= Katsura, Ibaraki =

Former village in Higashiibaraki district, Ibaraki prefecture, Japan

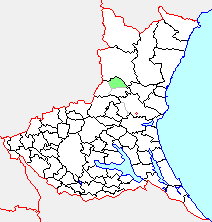
Map of Katsura, Ibaraki

Katsura (桂村, Katsura-mura) was a village located in Higashiibaraki District, Ibaraki Prefecture, Japan.

On 1 February 2005, Katsura, along with the town of Jōhoku (also from Higashiibaraki District), and the village of Nanakai (from Nishiibaraki District), was merged to create the town of Shirosato and no longer exists as an independent municipality.

As of 2003, the village had an estimated population of 6,924 and a density of 149.45 persons per one square kilometre (0.39 sq mi). The total area was 46.33 square kilometres (17.89 sq mi).
