= Ōno, Ibaraki =

Dissolved municipality in Ibaraki Prefecture, Japan

Ōno (大野村, Ōno-mura) was a village located in Kashima District, Ibaraki Prefecture, Japan.

On September 1, 1995, Ōno was absorbed into the town of Kashima (also from Kashima District) to create the city of Kashima.
