= Uchihara, Ibaraki =

Dissolved municipality in Ibaraki prefecture, Japan

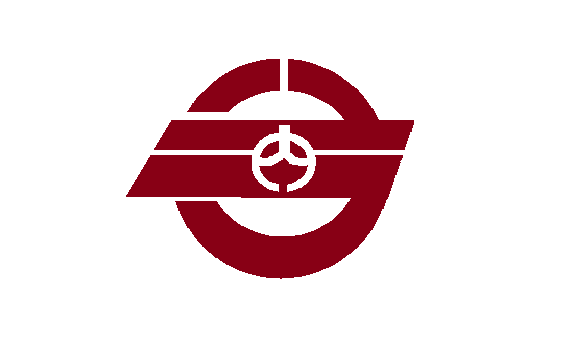
Flag of Uchihara Ibaraki

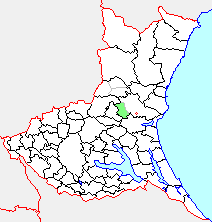
Map of Uchihara, Ibaraki

Uchihara (内原町, Uchihara-machi) was a town located in Higashiibaraki District, Ibaraki Prefecture, Japan.

On February 1, 2005, Uchihara was merged into the expanded city of Mito and no longer exists as an independent municipality.

As of 2003, the town had an estimated population of 14,848 and a density of 357.35 persons per km^{2}. The total area was 41.55 km^{2}.

Near Uchihara, there is perhaps the only electricity pylon in the world under whose legs a road with two lanes runs through. It is part of the powerline from Watari Substation 36°24′23″N 140°24′39″E to Kashiwabara Substation 36°13′9″N 140°15′15″E and situated at 36.354488°N 140.371627°E and 45 metres tall.
