= Taiyō, Ibaraki =

Dissolved municipality in Ibaraki prefecture, Japan

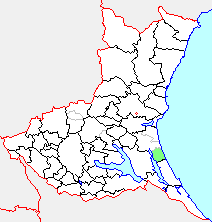
Map of Taiyō, Ibaraki

Taiyō (大洋村, Taiyō-mura) was a village located in Kashima District, Ibaraki Prefecture, Japan.

As of 2003, the village had an estimated population of 11,416 and a density of 261.65 persons per km^{2}. The total area was 43.63 km^{2}.

On October 11, 2005, Taiyō, along with the old town of Hokota, and the village of Asahi (all from Kashima District), was merged to create the city of Hokota.
