= Makabe (surname) =

Makabe (written: 真壁) is a Japanese surname. Notable people with the surname include:

- Shinya Makabe (rugby union) (真壁 伸弥, born 1987), Japanese rugby union player
- Togi Makabe (真壁 刀義, born 1972), Japanese professional wrestler
- Tomoe Makabe (真壁 友枝, born 1974), Japanese judoka
- The brothers Sanjuro and Toshiro Makabe are principal characters in the video game Shogo: Mobile Armor Division
