= Tomobe, Ibaraki =

Dissolved municipality in Ibaraki prefecture, Japan

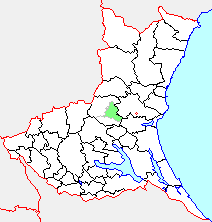
Map of Tomobe, Ibaraki

Tomobe (友部町, Tomobe-machi) was a town located in Nishiibaraki District, Ibaraki Prefecture, Japan.

As of 2003, the town had an estimated population of 35,657 and a density of 607.34 persons per km^{2}. The total area was 58.71 km^{2}.

On March 19, 2006, Tomobe, along with the town of Iwama (also from Nishiibaraki District), was merged into the expanded city of Kasama. The former Tomobe Town Hall is now converted into the new Kasama City Hall because prior to the merger, Tomobe had more people than the old city of Kasama.
