= Nanakai, Ibaraki =

Former village in Nishiibaraki district, Ibaraki prefecture, Japan

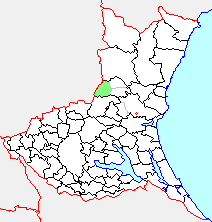
Map of Nanakai, Ibaraki

Nanakai (七会村, Nanakai-mura) was a village located in Nishiibaraki District, Ibaraki Prefecture, Japan.

On 1 February 2005, Nanakai, along with the town of Jōhoku, and the village of Katsura (both from Higashiibaraki District), was merged to create the town of Shirosato and no longer exists as an independent municipality.

As of 2003, the village had an estimated population of 2,385 and a density of 37.83 persons per one square kilometre (0.39 sq mi). The total area was 63.04 square kilometres (24.34 sq mi).
