= Yamato, Ibaraki =

Dissolved municipality in Ibaraki Prefecture, Japan

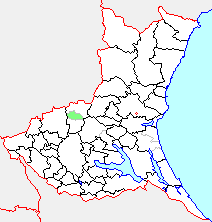
Map of Yamato, Ibaraki

Yamato (大和村, Yamato-mura) was a village located in Makabe District, Ibaraki Prefecture, Japan.

As of 2003, the village had an estimated population of 7,331 and a density of 250.89 persons per km^{2}. The total area was 29.22 km^{2}. The village was established in 1954.

On October 1, 2005, Yamato, along with the town of Makabe (also from Makabe District), and the town of Iwase (from Nishiibaraki District), was merged to create the city of Sakuragawa.
