= Kashima District, Ibaraki =

Former district in Ibaraki prefecture, Japan

Kashima (鹿島郡, Kashima-gun) was a district located in Ibaraki Prefecture, Japan.

As of 2003, the district had an estimated population of 141,935 and a density of 404.21 persons per km^{2}. The total area was 351.14 km^{2}.

== Mergers ==
- On September 1, 1995 - the town of Kashima absorbed the village of Ōno to create the city of Kashima.
- On August 1, 2005 - the town of Kamisu absorbed the town of Hasaki to create the city of Kamisu.
- On October 11, 2005 - the town of Hokota absorbed the villages of Asahi and Taiyō to create the city of Hokota. Therefore, Kashima District was dissolved as a result of this merger.
