= Nishiibaraki District =

Former district in Ibaraki prefecture, Japan

Nishiibaraki (西茨城郡, Nishiibaraki-gun)

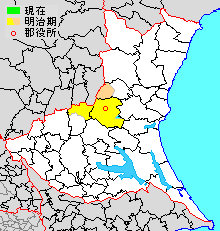
Area of Nishiibaraki County, Ibaraki Prefecture

, literally West Ibaraki, was a district located in Ibaraki Prefecture, Japan.

As of 2004, the district had an estimated population of 52,291. The total area was 108.64 km^{2}.

There were two municipalities before the dissolution:

- Iwama
- Tomobe

On March 19, 2006, the towns of Iwama and Tomobe were merged into the expanded city of Kasama. Therefore, Nishiibaraki District was dissolved as a result of this merger.

== District Timeline ==
- February 15, 1958 - The town of Kasama gained city status.
- February 1, 2005 - The village of Nanakai was merged with the town of Jōhoku, and village of Katsura (both from Higashiibaraki District), to create the town of Shirosato (in Higashiibaraki District).
- October 1, 2005 - The town of Iwase was merged with the town of Makabe, and the village of Yamato (both from Makabe District) to create the city of Sakuragawa.
- March 19, 2006 - The towns of Iwama and Tomobe were merged into the expanded city of Kasama. Therefore, Nishiibaraki District was dissolved as a result of this merger.
