= Sakuragawa =

Sakuragawa 桜川市
- City
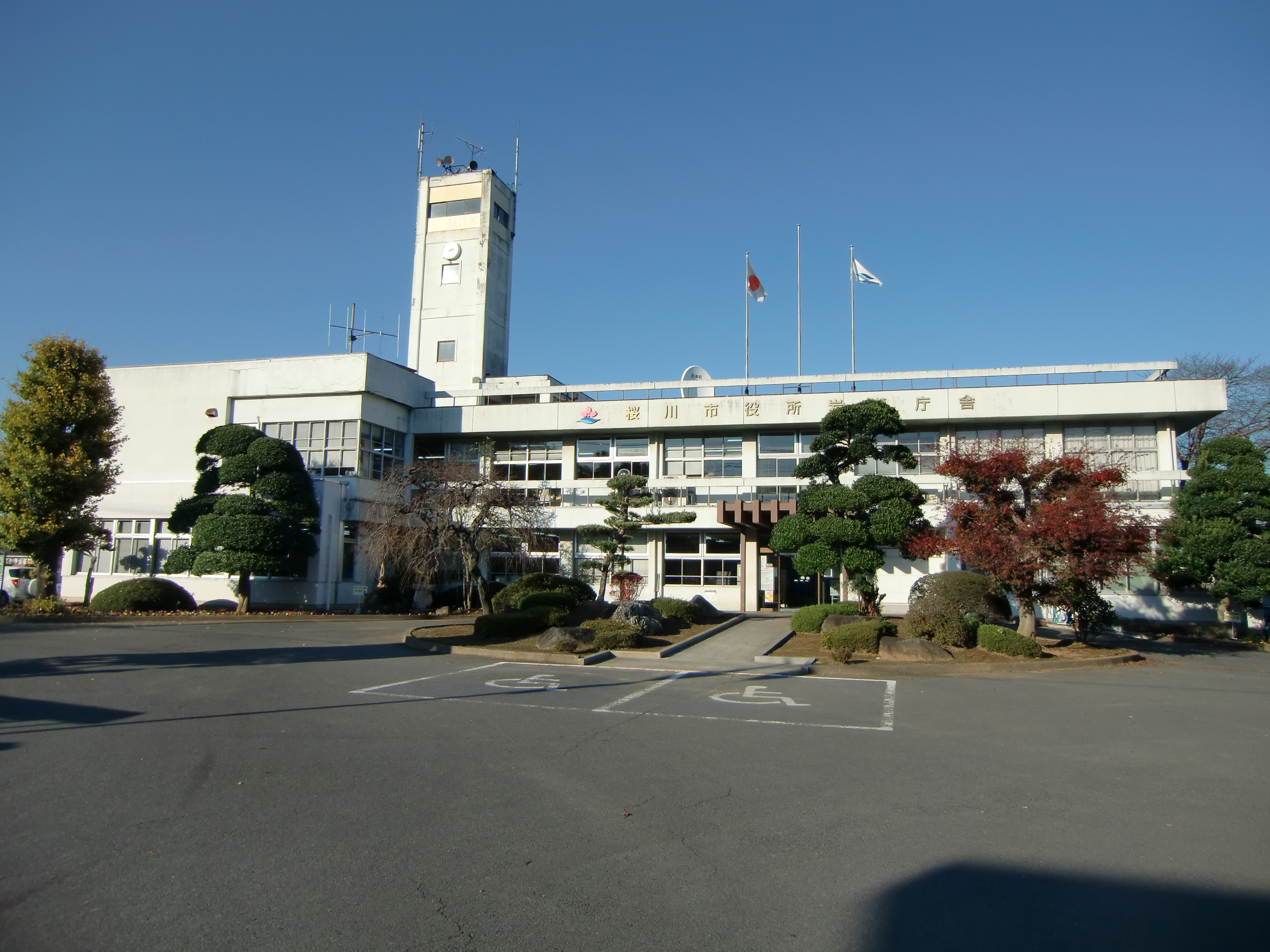
- Sakuragawa City Hall

- Flag Seal

- Location of Sakuragawa in Ibaraki Prefecture

- Coordinates: 36°19′38.3″N 140°5′26″E
- Country: Japan
- Region: Kantō
- Prefecture: Ibaraki

Area
  - Total: 180.06 km^{2} (69.52 sq mi)

Population (October 2020)
  - Total: 38,905
  - Density: 216.07/km^{2} (559.61/sq mi)
- Time zone: UTC+9 (Japan Standard Time)
- Tree: Sakura
- Flower: Lilium auratum
- Bird: Japanese bush warbler
- Phone number: 0296-58-5126
- Address: 1023 Haneda, Sakuragawa-shi, Ibaraki-ken 309-1293
- Website: Official website

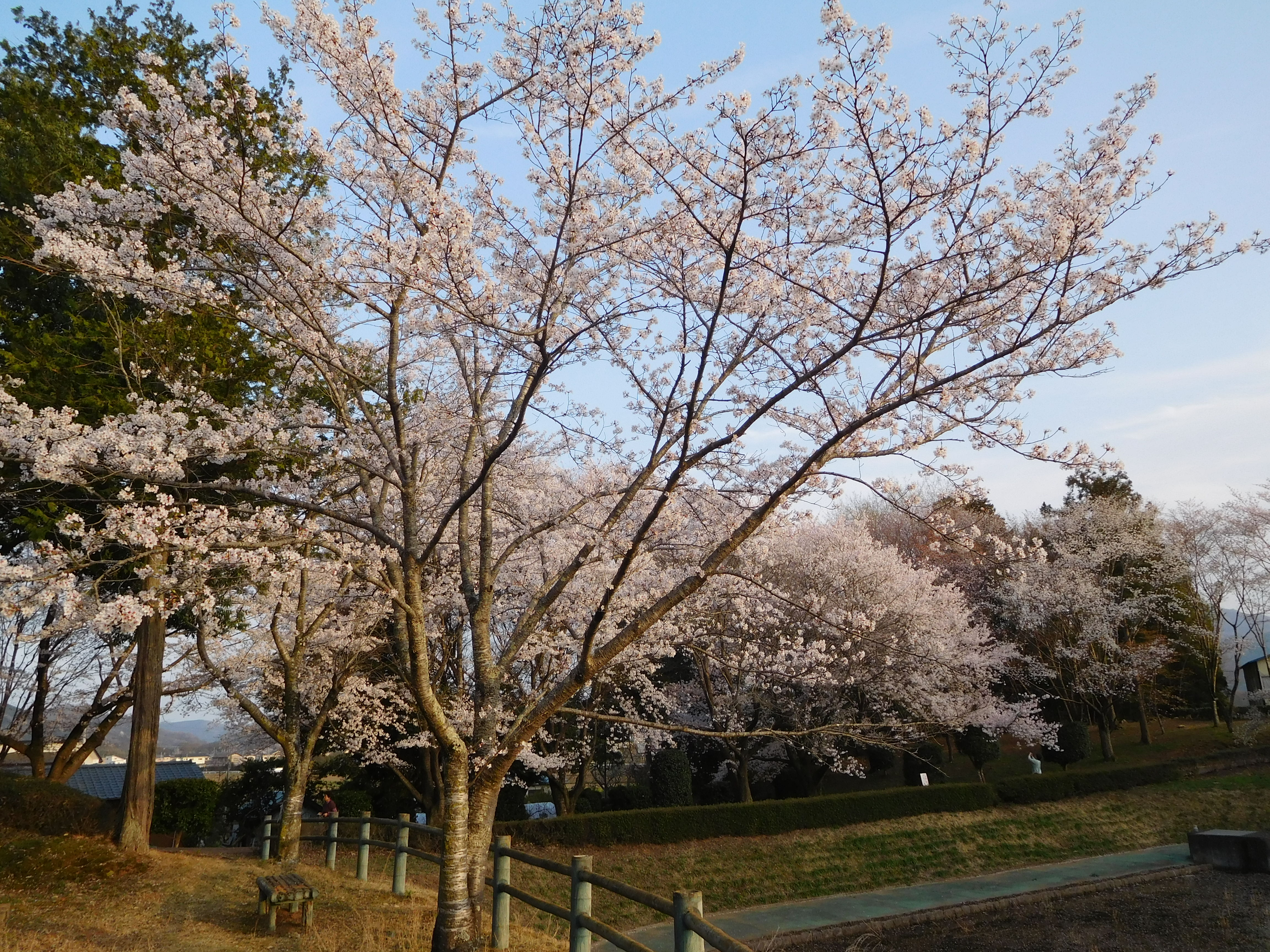
Cherry Blossoms of Sakuragawa

Sakuragawa (桜川市, Sakuragawa-shi) is a city located in Ibaraki Prefecture, Japan. As of 1 July 2020, the city had an estimated population of 39,072 in 13,721 households and a population density of 217 persons per km^{2}. The percentage of the population aged over 65 was 34.3%. The total area of the city is 180.06 square kilometres (69.52 sq mi).

== Geography ==
Located in central-western Ibaraki Prefecture, Sakuragawa is bordered by Tochigi Prefecture to the north. The city is lined by mountains along its east side, named Tomiya, Amabiki, Kaba and Ashio, from north to south. Mount Tsukuba dominates the southern side, although it is not located within the borders of the city. The eponymous Sakuragawa River has its source in the Iwase area of the city

=== Surrounding municipalities ===
Ibaraki Prefecture

- Chikusei
- Ishioka
- Kasama
- Tsukuba

Tochigi Prefecture

- Mashiko
- Mooka
- Motegi

=== Climate ===
Sakuragawa has a Humid continental climate (Köppen Cfa) characterized by warm summers and cool winters with light snowfall. The average annual temperature in Sakuragawa is 13.5 °C. The average annual rainfall is 1355 mm with September as the wettest month. The temperatures are highest on average in August, at around 25.5 °C, and lowest in January, at around 2.5 °C.

== Demographics ==
Per Japanese census data, the population of Sakuragawa has declined in recent decades.

Historical population
Year	Pop.	±%
1950	57,418	—
1960	52,993	−7.7%
1970	49,169	−7.2%
1980	51,171	+4.1%
1990	51,880	+1.4%
2000	50,334	−3.0%
2010	45,673	−9.3%
2020	39,122	−14.3%

== History ==
The city of Sakuragawa was established on October 1, 2005, from the merger of the towns of Iwase (in the north), Makabe (in the south) with the village of Yamato (in the center). Iwase was formerly from Nishiibaraki District, while Makabe and Yamato were formerly from Makabe District.

== Government ==
Sakuragawa has a mayor-council form of government with a directly elected mayor and a unicameral city council of 18 members. Sakuragawa contributes one member to the Ibaraki Prefectural Assembly. In terms of national politics, the city is part of Ibaraki 1st district of the lower house of the Diet of Japan.

== Economy ==
The economy of Sakuragawa is primarily agricultural. Stone quarrying is also important.

== Education ==
Sakuragawa has nine public elementary schools and four public middle schools operated by the city government, and two public high schools operated by the Ibaraki Prefectural Board of Education. There is also one private middle school and one private high school.

== Transportation ==
=== Railway ===
JR East – Mito Line

- Yamato - Iwase - Haguro

=== Highway ===
- Kita-Kantō Expressway – Sakuragawa-Nishi Interchange
- National Route 50

== Local attractions ==
- Amabiki Kannon
- Makabe Doll Festival
- Makabe old town with 104 buildings listed as Registered Tangible Cultural Properties
- "Tsukuba Ring-Ring Road" – a bicycle road connecting Iwase to Tsukuba along a former railway line.

== Noted people from Sakuragawa ==
- Tamon Hasegawa, politician
- Megu Sakuragawa, voice actress
