= Hideaki Okabe =

Japanese politician

- 岡部 英明

Member of the House of Representatives
- In office 11 September 2005 – 21 July 2009
- Constituency: Northern Kanto PR

Personal details
- Born: 31 March 1959 (age 67) Hitachi, Ibaraki, Japan
- Party: Liberal Democratic
- Parent: Hideo Okabe (father)
- Education: Keio University

Hideaki Okabe (岡部 英明, Okabe Hideaki; born 31 March 1959) is a Japanese politician of the Liberal Democratic Party, a member of the House of Representatives in the Diet (national legislature). A native of Hitachi, Ibaraki and graduate of Keio University, he was elected to the assembly of Tochigi Prefecture in 2003 and then to the House of Representatives for the first time in 2005.
