= Ogawa, Ibaraki (Higashiibaraki) =

Dissolved municipality in Ibaraki prefecture, Japan

Ogawa (小川町, Ogawa-machi) was a town located in Higashiibaraki District, Ibaraki Prefecture, Japan.

== Population ==
As of 2003, the town had an estimated population of 19,545 and a density of 310.34 persons per km^{2}. The total area was 62.98 km^{2}.

== Merge ==
On March 27, 2006, Ogawa, along with the town of Minori (also from Higashiibaraki District), and the village of Tamari (from Niihari District), was merged to create the city of Omitama.
