= Niihari District =

Former district in Ibaraki prefecture, Japan

Niihari (新治郡, Niihari-gun) was a district located in Ibaraki, Japan. The district was dissolved on March 27, 2006.

The district had only one village before dissolution:

- Tamari

== Timeline (Heisei Era, 1989-2006) ==
- January 1, 1992 - The village of Chiyoda was elevated to town status.
- April 1, 1997 - The village of Dejima was elevated to town status and changed the name to Kasumigaura.
- March 28, 2005 - The town of Kasumigaura absorbed the town of Chiyoda to create the city of Kasumigaura.
- October 1, 2005 - The town of Yasato was merged into the expanded city of Ishioka.
- February 20, 2006 - The village of Niihari was merged into the expanded city of Tsuchiura.
- March 27, 2006 - The village of Tamari was merged with the towns of Ogawa and Minori (both from Higashiibaraki District) to create the city of Omitama. Niihari District was dissolved as a result of this merger.
