= Chiyoda, Ibaraki =

Former town located in Ibaraki Prefecture, Japan

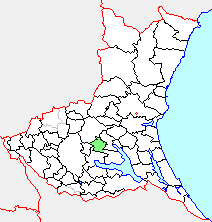
Map of Chiyoda, Ibaraki

Chiyoda (千代田町, Chiyoda-machi) was a town located in Niihari District, Ibaraki Prefecture, Japan.

As of 2003, the town had an estimated population of 26,943 and a population density of 555.53 persons per km^{2}. The total area was 48.50 km^{2}.

On March 28, 2005, Chiyoda, along with the old town of Kasumigaura (also from Niihari District), was merged to create the city of Kasumigaura and no longer exists as an independent municipality.
