= Kyōwa, Ibaraki =

Dissolved municipality in Ibaraki Prefecture, Japan

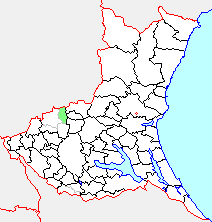
Map of Kyōwa, Ibaraki

Kyōwa (協和町, Kyōwa-machi) was a town located in Makabe District, Ibaraki Prefecture, Japan.

As of 2003, the town had an estimated population of 16,814 and a density of 463.96 persons per km^{2}. The total area was 36.24 km^{2}.

On March 28, 2005, Kyōwa, along with the city of Shimodate, the towns of Akeno and Sekijō (all from Makabe District) was merged to create the city of Chikusei and no longer exists as an independent municipality.
