= Makabe, Ibaraki =

Dissolved municipality in Ibaraki Prefecture, Japan

Coordinates: 36.267°N 140.100°E

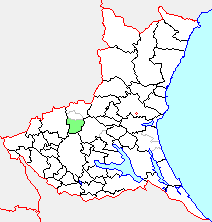
Map of Makabe, Ibaraki

Makabe (真壁町, Makabe-machi) was a town located in Makabe District, Ibaraki Prefecture, Japan.

As of 2003, the town had an estimated population of 19,368 and a density of 305.49 persons per km^{2}. The total area was 63.40 km^{2}.

On October 1, 2005, Makabe, along with the village of Yamato (also from Makabe District), and the town of Iwase (from Nishiibaraki District), was merged to create the city of Sakuragawa.

== See also ==
- Groups of Traditional Buildings
