= Makabe District =

Former district in Ibaraki prefecture, Japan

Makabe (真壁郡, Makabe-gun) was a district located in Ibaraki Prefecture, Japan.

As of the Chikusei merger, but with 2003 population data, the district had an estimated population of 26,699 and a density of 288 persons per km^{2}. The total area was 92.62 km^{2}.

== Towns and villages at the time of closure ==
- Makabe
- Yamato

== Mergers ==
- On March 28, 2005 - the towns of Akeno, Kyōwa and Sekijō were merged with the city of Shimodate to create the city of Chikusei.
- On October 1, 2005 - the town of Makabe, and the village of Yamato were merged with the town of Iwase (from Nishiibaraki District) to create the city of Sakuragawa. Therefore, Makabe District was dissolved as a result of this merger.
