= Higashiibaraki District =

District in Ibaraki Prefecture, Japan

Coordinates: 36.479°N 140.327°E

Higashiibaraki District (yellow) in Ibaraki Prefecture

Higashiibaraki District (東茨城郡, Higashiibaraki-gun) is a district located in Ibaraki Prefecture, Japan.

As of 2003, the district has an estimated population of 122,478 and a density of 284 persons per km^{2}. The total area is 431.44 km^{2}.

== Towns and villages ==
- Ibaraki
- Ōarai
- Shirosato

== Mergers ==
- On October 16, 2004 the town of Ōmiya absorbed the villages of Miwa and Ogawa, all from Naka District; the town of Yamagata, and the village of Gozenyama, in order to turn the town into the current city of Hitachiōmiya.
- On February 1, 2005 the town of Jōhoku, and village of Katsura merged with the village of Nanakai, from Nishiibaraki District, to form the new town of Shirosato.
- Also on February 1, 2005 the town of Uchihara merged into the city of Mito.
- On March 20, 2006 the towns of Ogawa and Minori merged with the village of Tamari, from Niihari District, to form the new city of Omitama.
- On December 8, 2007 the town of Ibaraki was scheduled to merge into the city of Mito, but those plans were abandoned.
