= Naka District, Ibaraki =

District in Ibaraki prefecture, Japan

Coordinates: 36°27′38″N 140°35′17″E

Location of Naka District in Ibaraki Prefecture

Naka (那珂郡, Naka-gun) is a district of Ibaraki Prefecture, Japan.

Following the January 21, 2005 formation of the city of Naka, the district is coextensive with the village of Tōkai. As of January 1, 2005 population data, the district has an estimated population of 35,467 and a density of 946.29 persons per km^{2}. The total area is 37.48 km^{2}.

== Towns and villages ==
- Tōkai

== Timeline (Heisei Era) ==
- On October 16, 2004 the town of Ōmiya absorbed the villages of Miwa and Ogawa, all from Naka District, the town of Yamagata, and the village of Gozenyama, both from Higashiibaraki District, to become the new city of Hitachiōmiya.
- On January 21, 2005 the town of Naka absorbed the town of Urizura to become the new city of Naka.
