= E501 =

E501 may refer to:

- E number 501, a food additive
- E501 series, electric multiple unit operating in Japan
