= Haguro Station (Ibaraki) =

Railway station in Sakuragawa, Ibaraki Prefecture, Japan

Haguro Station 羽黒駅
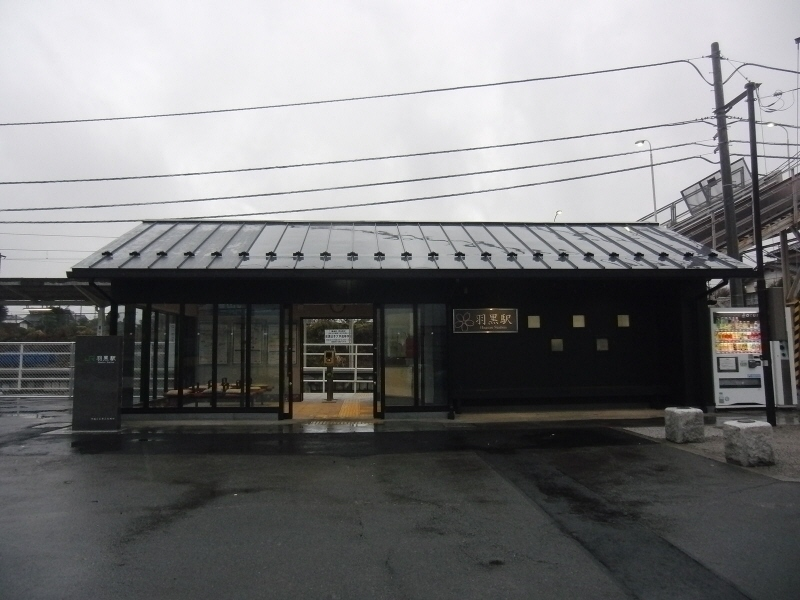
- Haguri Station, March 2014

General information
- Location: Tomobe 1553, Sakuragawa-shi, Ibaraki-ken 309-1453; Japan
- Coordinates: 36°21′19″N 140°08′36″E
- Operator: JR East
- Line: ■ Mito Line
- Distance: 32.8 km from Oyama
- Platforms: 1 island platform

Other information
- Status: Unstaffed
- Website: Official website

History
- Opened: 20 July 1910

Passengers
- FY2018: 671 daily

Services
Preceding station	JR East	Following station
Iwase towards Oyama	Mito Line	Fukuhara towards Mito
Location
- Location within Ibaraki Prefecture Location within Japan

Haguro Station (羽黒駅, Haguro-eki) is a passenger railway station in the city of Sakuragawa, Ibaraki, Japan, operated by East Japan Railway Company (JR East).

== Lines ==
Haguro Station is served by the Mito Line, and is located 32.8 km from the official starting point of the line at Oyama Station.

== Station layout ==
The station consists one island platform, connected to the station building by a footbridge. The station is unattended.

== Passenger statistics ==
In fiscal 2018, the station was used by an average of 671 passengers daily (boarding passengers only).

=== Platforms ===
1	■ Mito Line	for Tomobe and Mito
2	■ Mito Line	for Shimodate and Oyama

== History ==
Haguro Station was opened on 1 April 1904 as a freight station. Scheduled passenger operations began from 20 July 1910. The station was absorbed into the JR East network upon the privatization of the Japanese National Railways (JNR) on 1 April 1987.

== Surrounding area ==
- National Route 50
- Higashi-Naka Post Office

== See also ==
- List of railway stations in Japan
