= Yamato Station (Ibaraki) =

Railway station in Sakuragawa, Ibaraki Prefecture, Japan

Yamato Station 大和駅
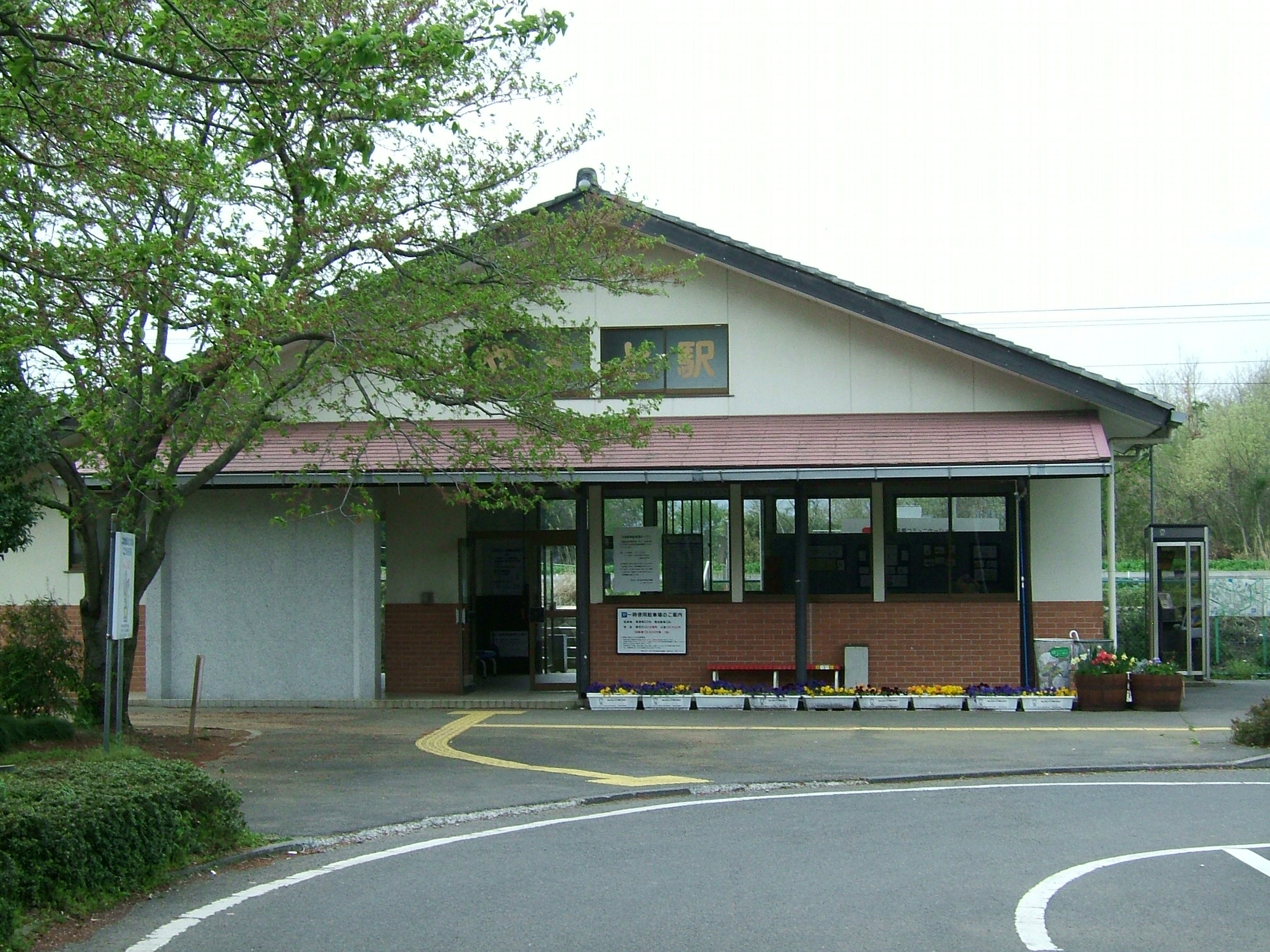
- Yamato Station, April 2008

General information
- Location: Takamori 926, Sakuragawa, Ibaraki-ken 309-1246; Japan
- Coordinates: 36°20′44″N 140°04′24″E
- Operator: JR East
- Line: ■ Mito Line
- Distance: 25.9 km from Oyama
- Platforms: 1 side platform

Other information
- Status: Unstaffed
- Website: Official website

History
- Opened: 20 June 1988

Services
Preceding station	JR East	Following station
Niihari towards Oyama	Mito Line	Iwase towards Mito
Location
- Location within Ibaraki Prefecture Location within Japan

Yamato Station (大和駅, Yamato-eki) is a passenger railway station in the city of Sakuragawa, Ibaraki, Japan, operated by East Japan Railway Company (JR East).

== Lines ==
Yamato Station is served by the Mito Line, and is located 25.9 km from the official starting point of the line at Oyama Station.

== Station layout ==
The station consists of one side platform serving traffic in both directions. The station is unattended.

== History ==
Yamato Station was opened on 20 June 1988.

== Surrounding area ==
- National Route 50

== See also ==
- List of railway stations in Japan
