= E531 series =

Japanese electric multiple unit train type

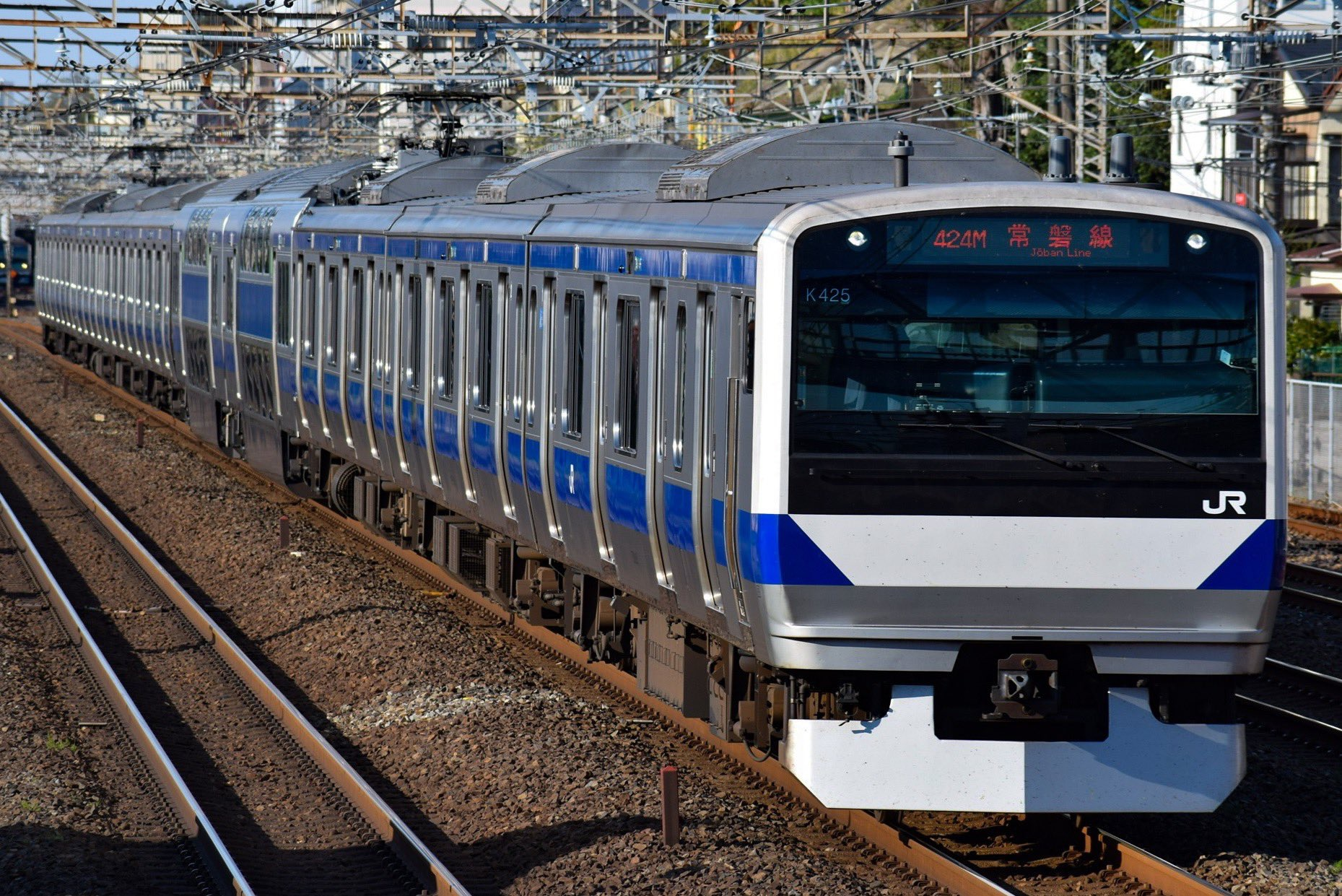
- An E531 series train on the Joban Line (in March 2019 Between Matsudo Station and Kanamachi Station)
- In service: 2005–present
- Manufacturers: Tokyu Car Corporation, Kawasaki Heavy Industries, JR East, J-TREC
- Replaced: 403 series, 415 series, some E501 series
- Constructed: 2005–2020, 2024
- Entered service: 9 July 2005
- Number built: 461 vehicles; 26 × 10-car; 40 × 5-car; 1 × end car
- Number in service: 460 vehicles
- Formation: 5/10 cars per trainset
- Fleet numbers: K401–K426 (10-car sets); K451–K483 (standard 5-car sets); K551–K557 (cold-weather 5-car sets)
- Operator: JR East
- Depot: Katsuta
- Lines served: ■ Ueno–Tokyo Line; ■ Jōban Line; ■ Mito Line; ■ Tōhoku Main Line

Specifications
- Car body construction: Stainless steel
- Car length: 20,000 mm (65 ft 7 in)
- Width: 2,950 mm (9 ft 8 in)
- Floor height: 1,130 mm (3 ft 8 in)
- Doors: 4 pairs per side
- Maximum speed: 130 km/h (81 mph)
- Traction system: PWM 2-level IGBT–VVVF (Hitachi)
- Traction motors: 4 × 140 kW (190 hp) 3-phase AC induction motor (Hitachi)
- Power output: 1.12 MW (1,500 hp) (5-car sets); 2.24 MW (3,000 hp) (10-car sets)
- Acceleration: 2.5 km/(h⋅s) (1.6 mph/s)
- Deceleration: 4.2 km/(h⋅s) (2.6 mph/s)
- Electric systems: 1,500 V DC and 20 kV 50 Hz AC, both from overhead catenary
- Current collection: PS37A single-arm pantograph
- Bogies: DT71 (motored); TR255 (trailer)
- Braking system: Regenerative brake
- Safety systems: ATS-SN, ATS-P, ATS-Ps
- Track gauge: 1,067 mm (3 ft 6 in)

The E531 series (Japanese: E531系, Hepburn: E531-kei) is an electric multiple unit (EMU) train type operated by East Japan Railway Company (JR East) in Japan. It was introduced by JR East on 9 July 2005 to replace the aging 403 and 415 series EMUs running on the Jōban Line from Ueno Station in Tokyo. The stock is a dual-voltage (1,500 V DC & 20 kV AC) development of the DC-only E231 series suburban EMU design, and can run at speeds of up to 130 km/h (81 mph) in service.

== Operations ==
- Tōkaidō Main Line (Shinagawa–Tokyo)
- Ueno–Tokyo Line
- Jōban Line (Ueno–Haranomachi)
- Mito Line
- Tōhoku Main Line (Kuroiso–Shin-Shirakawa)

Trains are formed in 10-car (set numbers K401–K426) and 5-car (set numbers K451–K483, K551–K557) sets. 15-car formations are generally run between Shinagawa and Tsuchiura. 10-car and 5-car sets operate singley north of Tsuchiura, and 5-car sets are used on the Mito Line. 5-car cold weather sets (E531-3000 series) are used on the Tōhoku Main Line between Kuroiso and Shin-Shirakawa, to handle the change of electrification from DC to AC just north of Kuroiso.

== Formations ==
=== 10-car sets ===
As of 1 October 2018, 26 ten-car sets (K401–K426) are based at Katsuta Depot and formed with four motored ("M") cars and six non-powered trailer ("T") cars.

	← Takahagi Shinagawa →									
Car No.	10	9	8	7	6	5	4	3	2	1
Designation	Tc	T	M	M'	T'	Tsd	Tsd'	M	M'	Tc'
Numbering	KuHa E531-0	SaHa E531-0/-2000	MoHa E531-2000	MoHa E530-2000	SaHa E530-2000	SaRo E531-0	SaRo E530-0	MoHa E531-1000	MoHa E530-0	KuHa E530-0

- Cars 3 and 8 each have one single-arm pantograph.
- Cars 1 and 10 have a wheelchair space.
- Cars 1, 5, and 10 each have a toilet (universal design in cars 1 and 10).
- Car 8 is designated as a mildly air-conditioned car.
- Cars 4 and 5 are bilevel Green Cars.
- Car 9 in sets K412–K422 are numbered in the -2000 series and have longitudinal seating (these cars were originally cars 4 and 5 in sets K401–K406); in all other sets, they are numbered in the -0 series and have some transverse seating bays.
- Cars 1, 2, and 10 have some transverse seating bays.

=== Standard 5-car sets ===
As of 3 March 2020, 33 five-car sets (K451–K483) are based at Katsuta Depot and formed with two motored ("M") cars and three non-powered trailer ("T") cars.

	← Haranomachi Oyama, Shinagawa →				
Car No.	15	14	13	12	11
Designation	Tc	T	M	M'	Tc'
Numbering	KuHa E531-1000	SaHa E531-0	MoHa E531-0	MoHa E530-1000	KuHa E530-2000

- Car 13 has one single-arm pantograph.
- Cars 11 and 15 have a wheelchair space.
- Car 11 has a universal design toilet.
- Car 14 is designated as a mildly air-conditioned car.
- Cars 13, 14, and 15 have some transverse seating bays.

=== Cold-weather 5-car sets ===
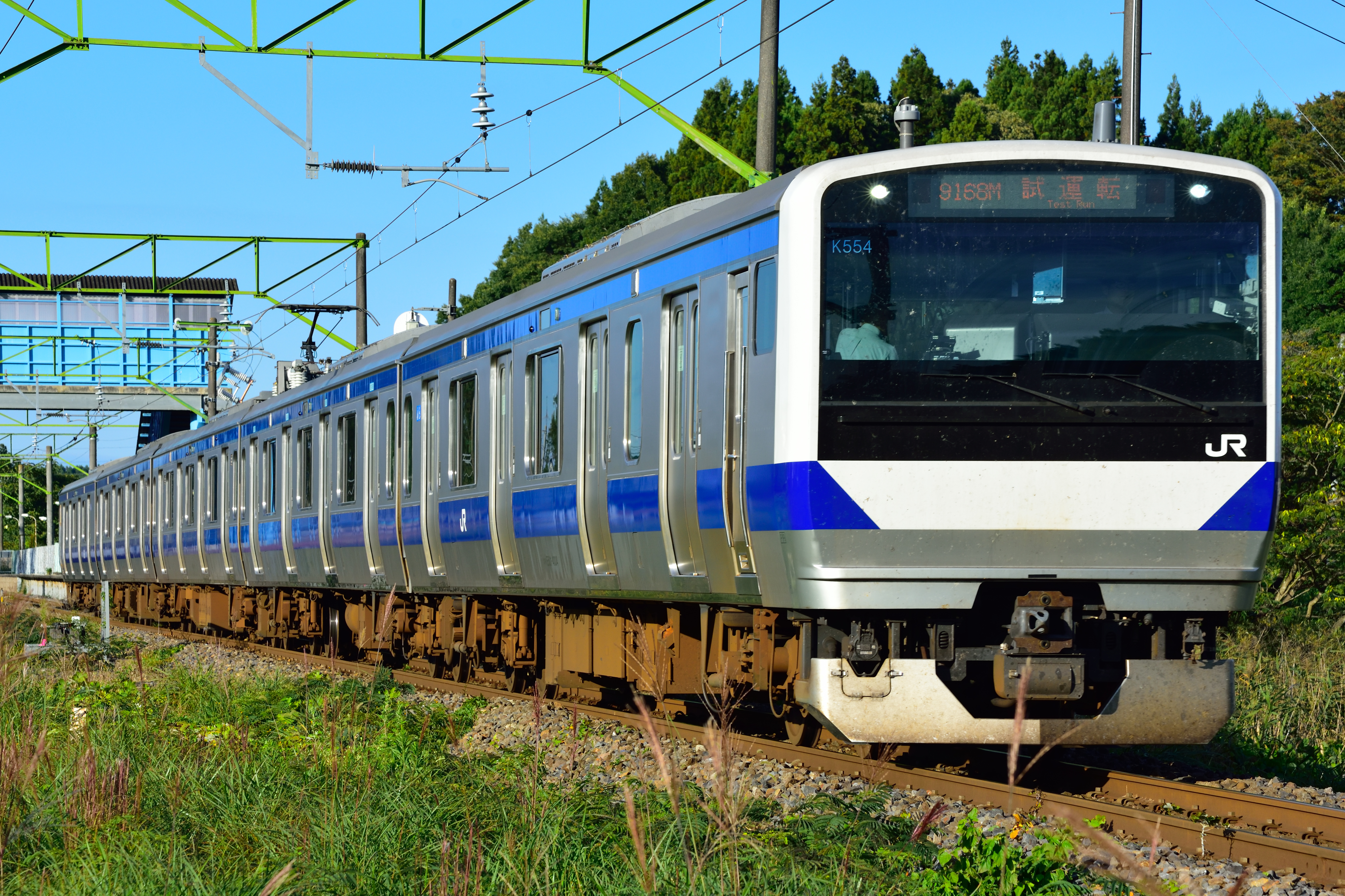
An E531 series train on the Tōhoku Main Line in October 2017 near Shirasaka

As of 1 October 2018, seven five-car sets (K551–K557) are based at Katsuta Depot and formed with two motored ("M") cars and three non-powered trailer ("T") cars.

	← Haranomachi, Kuroiso Shin-Shirakawa, Shinagawa →				
Car No.	15	14	13	12	11
Designation	Tc	T	M	M'	Tc'
Numbering	KuHa E531-4000	SaHa E531-3000	MoHa E531-3000	MoHa E530-4000	KuHa E530-5000

- Car 13 has one single-arm pantograph.
- Cars 11 and 15 have a wheelchair space.
- Car 11 has a universal design toilet.
- Car 14 is designated as a mildly air-conditioned car.
- Cars 13, 14, and 15 have some transverse seating bays.

=== Original 10-car sets (July 2005 – March 2007) ===
The original ten-car sets delivered without bilevel Green cars were formed as follows.

Sets K401–K406

	← Takahagi Ueno →									
Car No.	10	9	8	7	6	5	4	3	2	1
Designation	Tc	T	M	M'	T'	T	T	M	M'	Tc'
Numbering	KuHa E531-0	SaHa E531-0	MoHa E531-2000	MoHa E530-2000	SaHa E530-2000	SaHa E531-2000	SaHa E531-2000	MoHa E531-1000	MoHa E530-0	KuHa E530-0

Sets K407–K411

	← Takahagi Ueno →									
Car No.	10	9	8	7	6	5	4	3	2	1
Designation	Tc	T	M	M'	T'	T'	T'	M	M'	Tc'
Numbering	KuHa E531-0	SaHa E531-0	MoHa E531-2000	MoHa E530-2000	SaHa E530-2000	SaHa E530-2000	SaHa E530-2000	MoHa E531-1000	MoHa E530-0	KuHa E530-0

- Cars 3 and 8 each had one single-arm pantograph.
- Cars 1 and 10 had a wheelchair space.
- Cars 1, 5, and 10 each had a toilet (universal design in cars 1 and 10).
- Car 8 was designated as a mildly air-conditioned car.
- Cars 1, 2, 9, and 10 had some transverse seating bays.

== Interior ==
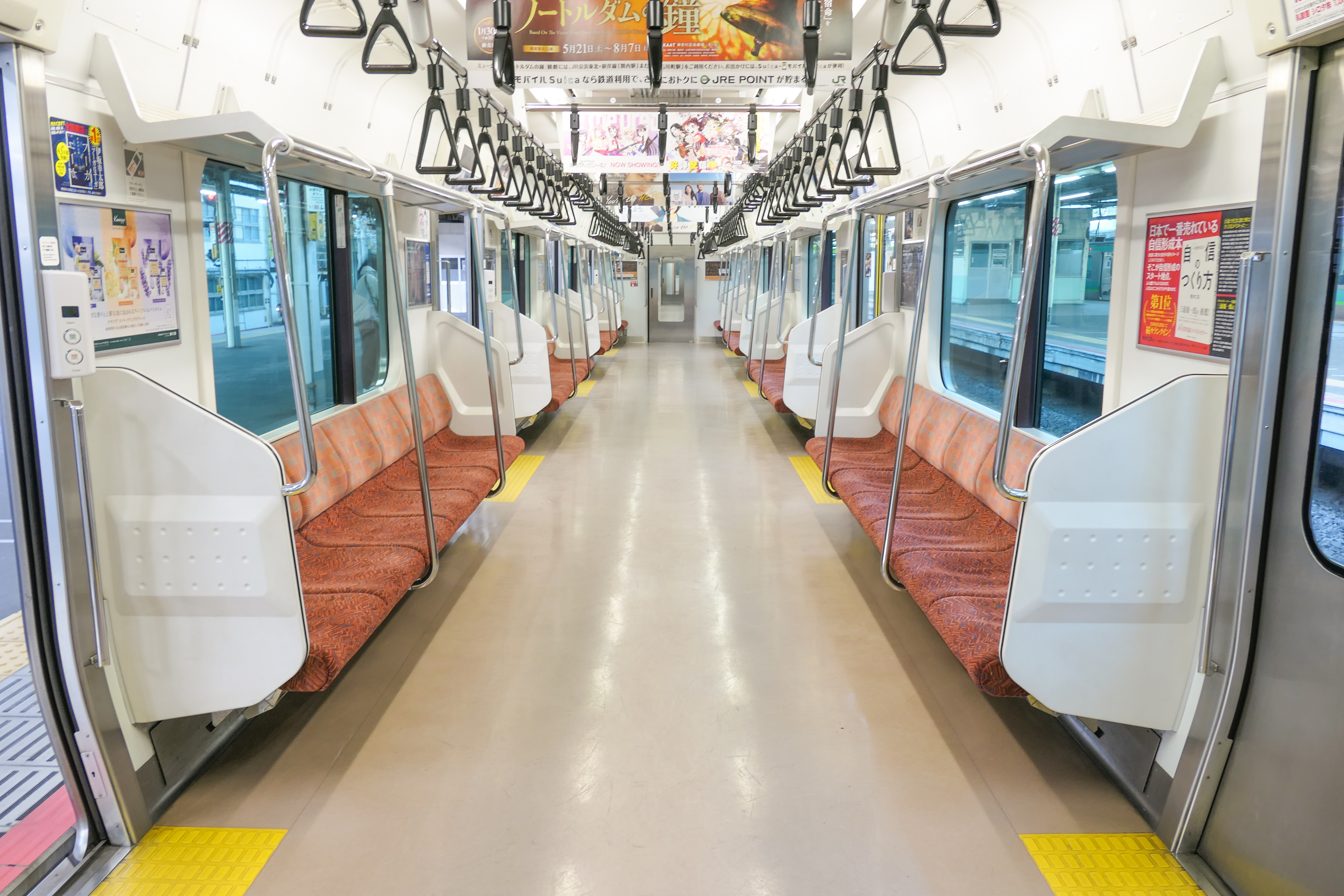
An ordinary-class car with longitudinal seating in January 2022

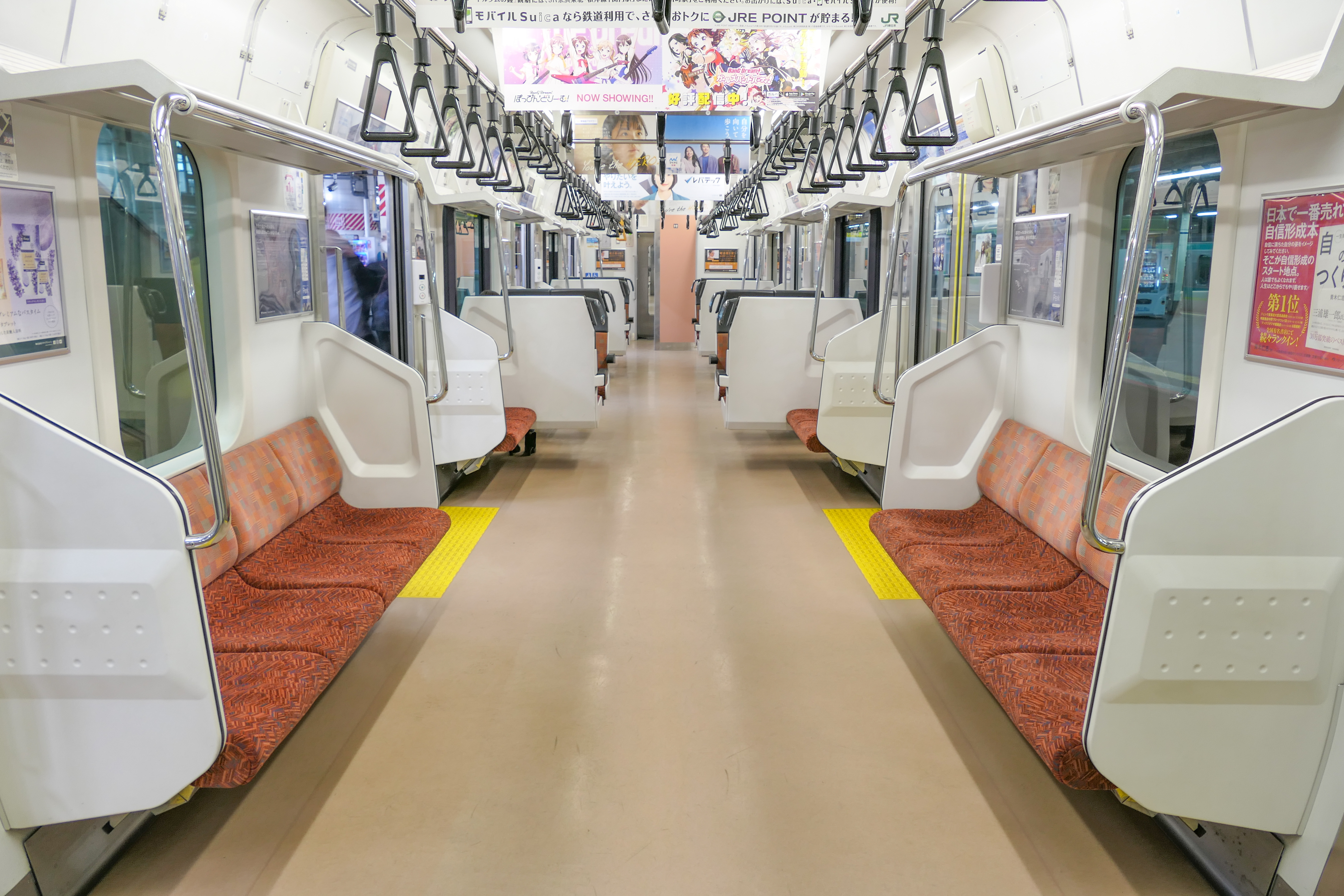
An ordinary-class car with a mixture of longitudinal and transverse seating in January 2022

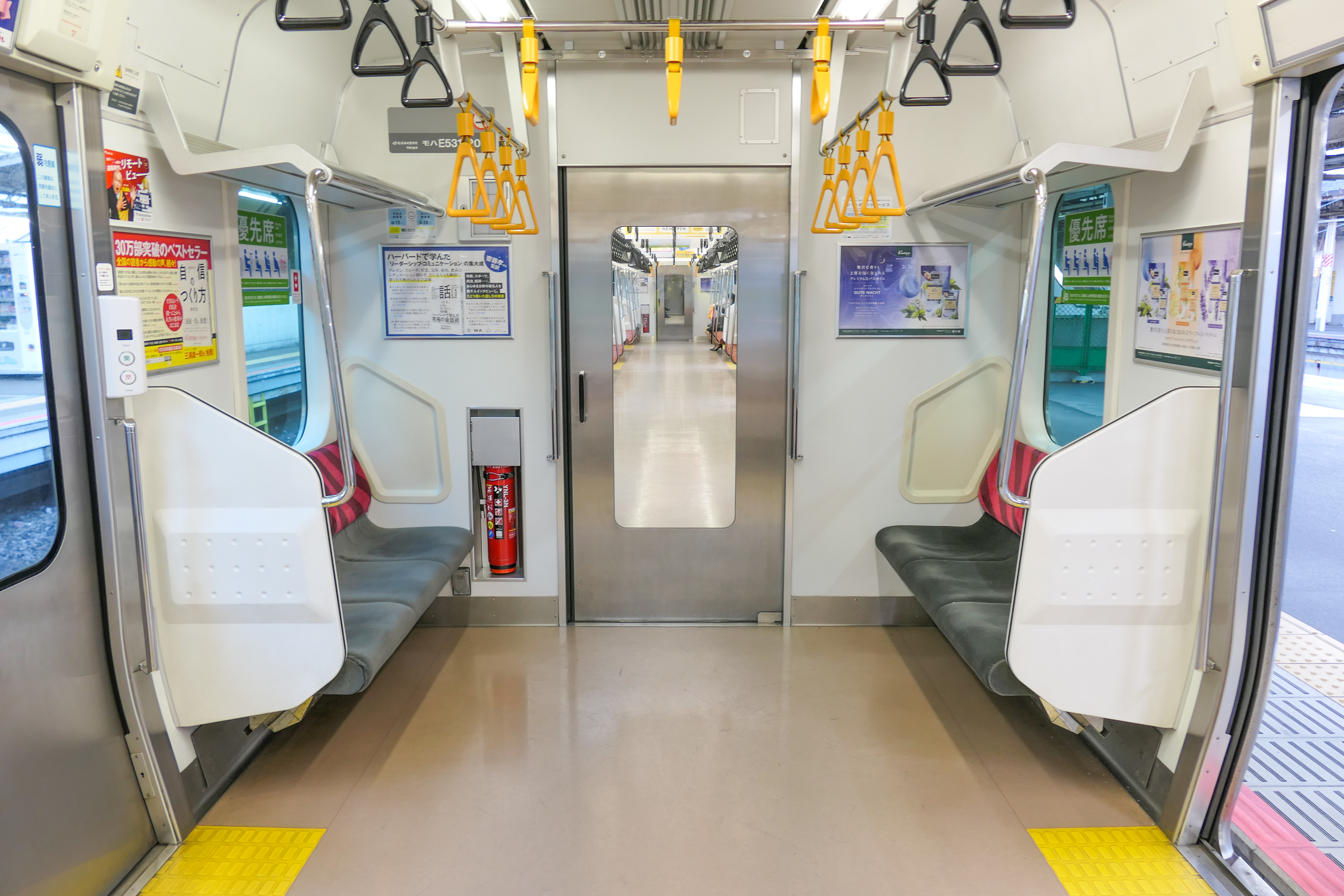
Priority seating in January 2022

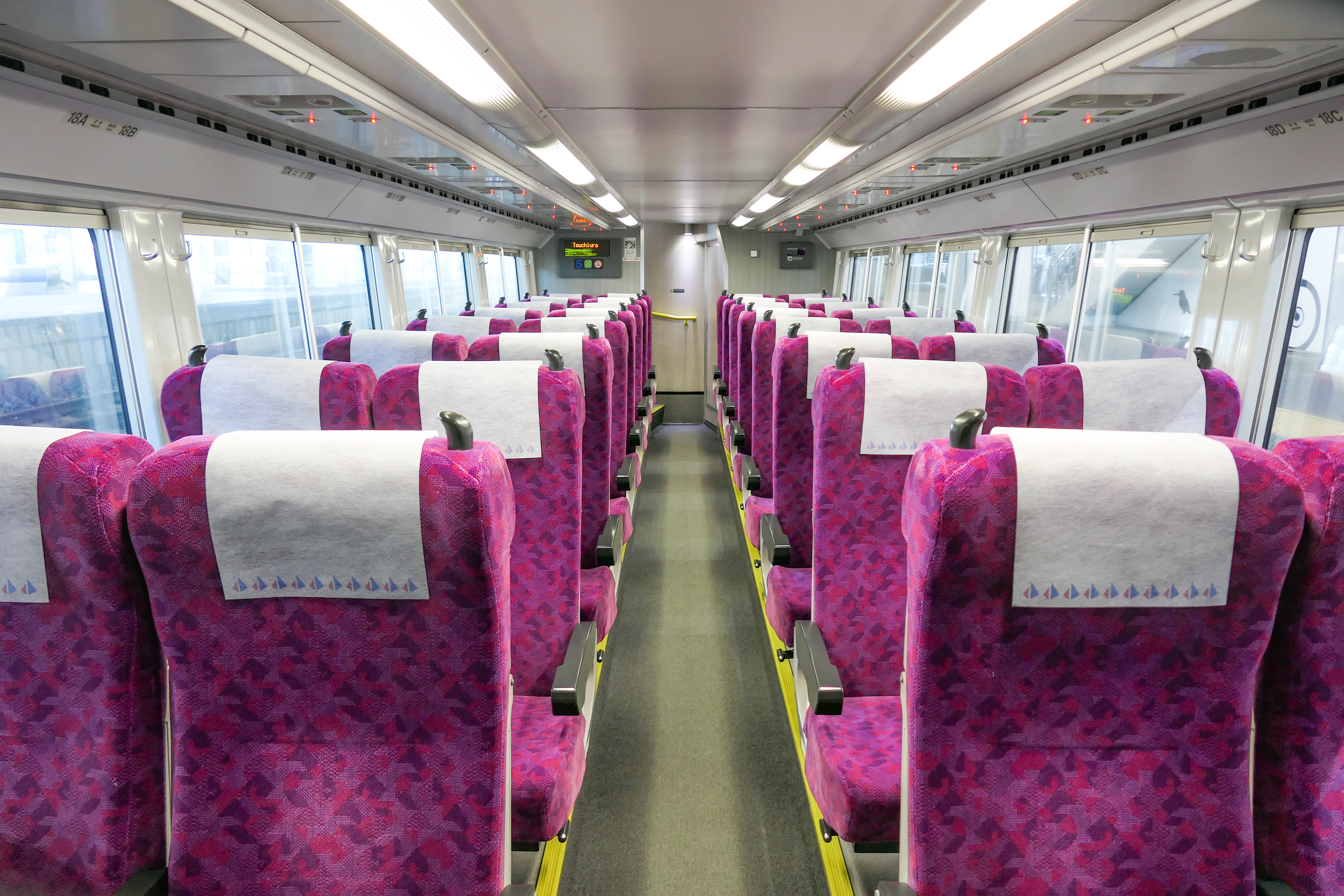
The lower deck of bilevel Green car SaRo E531-17 in January 2022

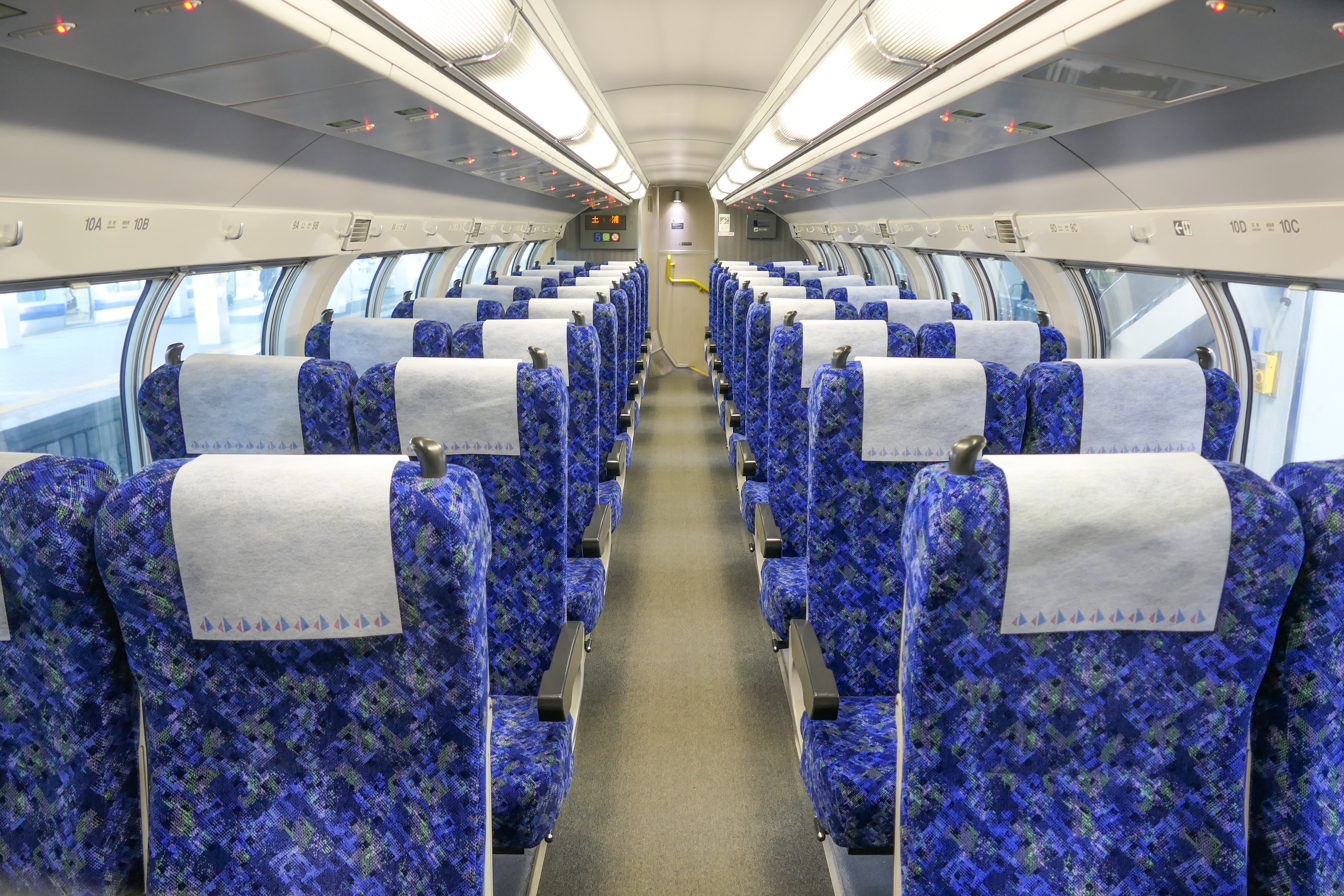
The upper deck of bilevel Green car SaRo E531-17 in January 2022

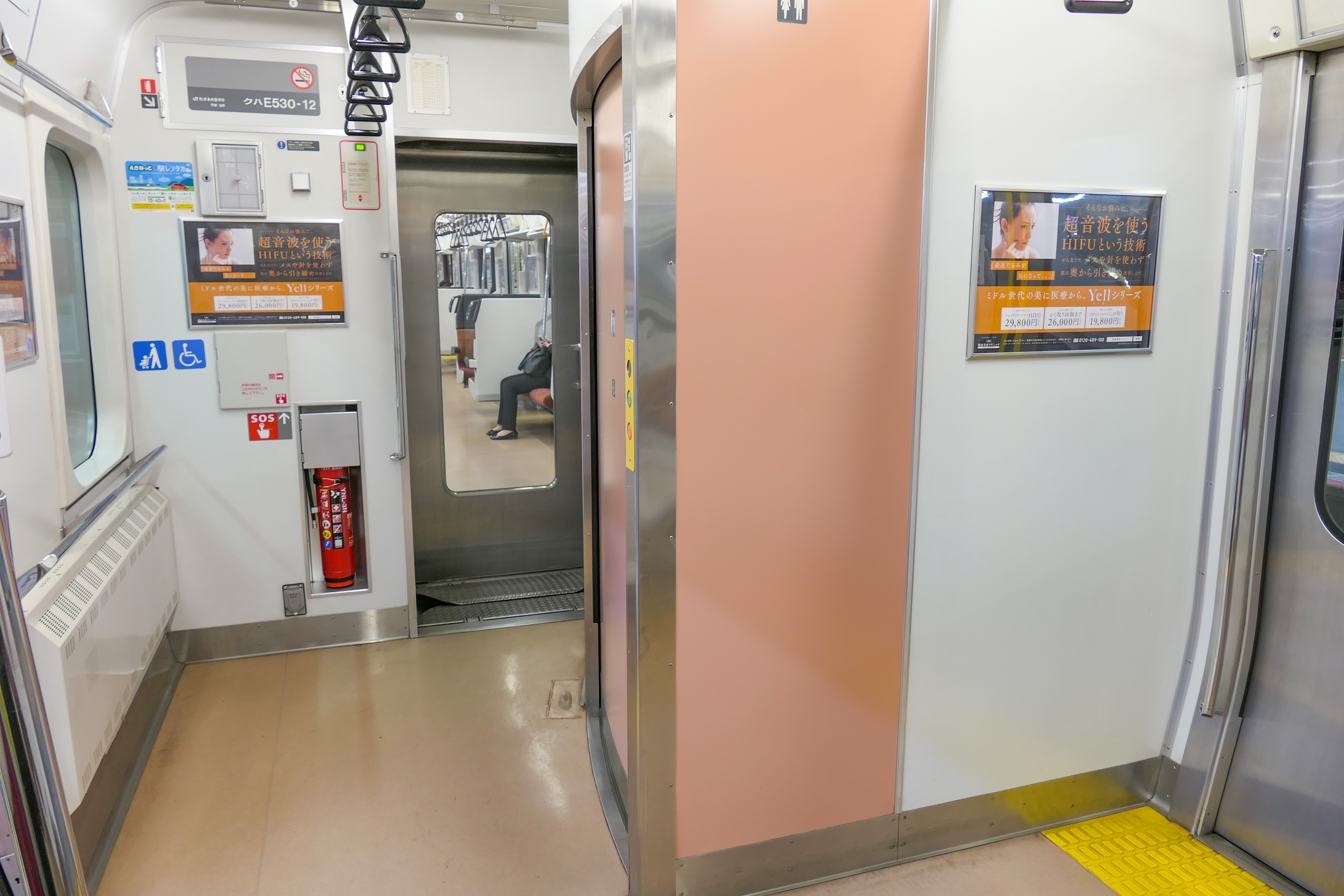
A toilet in January 2022

== History ==
The first E531 series trains entered service on 9 July 2005.

Pairs of double-deck "Green" (first class) cars were added to the ten-car sets from 6 January 2007, and all ten-car sets included Green cars by the start of the revised timetable on 18 March 2007. Two trailer cars from sets K401–K411 (cars 4 and 5) were repurposed as cars 6 and 9 in sets K412–K422. As there were 12 SaHa E531-2000 cars and 10 SaHa E530-2000 cars being repurposed (the latter type has an air compressor missing from the former type), the SaHa E531-2012 car was modified to become SaHa E530-2022.

In September 2014, an additional ten-car set, K423, was delivered from the J-TREC factory in Yokohama, four years after construction of the original fleet had ceased. This was followed by seven new five-car sets (K469–K475) also delivered from J-TREC in Yokohama from December 2014 to March 2015. Seven cold-weather E531-3000 series sets (K551–K557) were built between October 2015 and March 2017. Later in 2017, three more 10-car sets (K424–K426) and two more five-car sets (K476 and K477) were built. Then, between 2019 and 2020, six more five-car sets (K478–K483) were built.

On 26 March 2021, set K417 was involved in a collision between Tsuchiura and Kandatsu. It collided with a passenger vehicle which caught fire and caused damage to the KuHa E531-17 car (car 10). The damaged car was replaced with car 10 (KuHa E531-9) from set K409, which later received a new-build end car, also numbered KuHa E531-17.

=== Special liveries ===
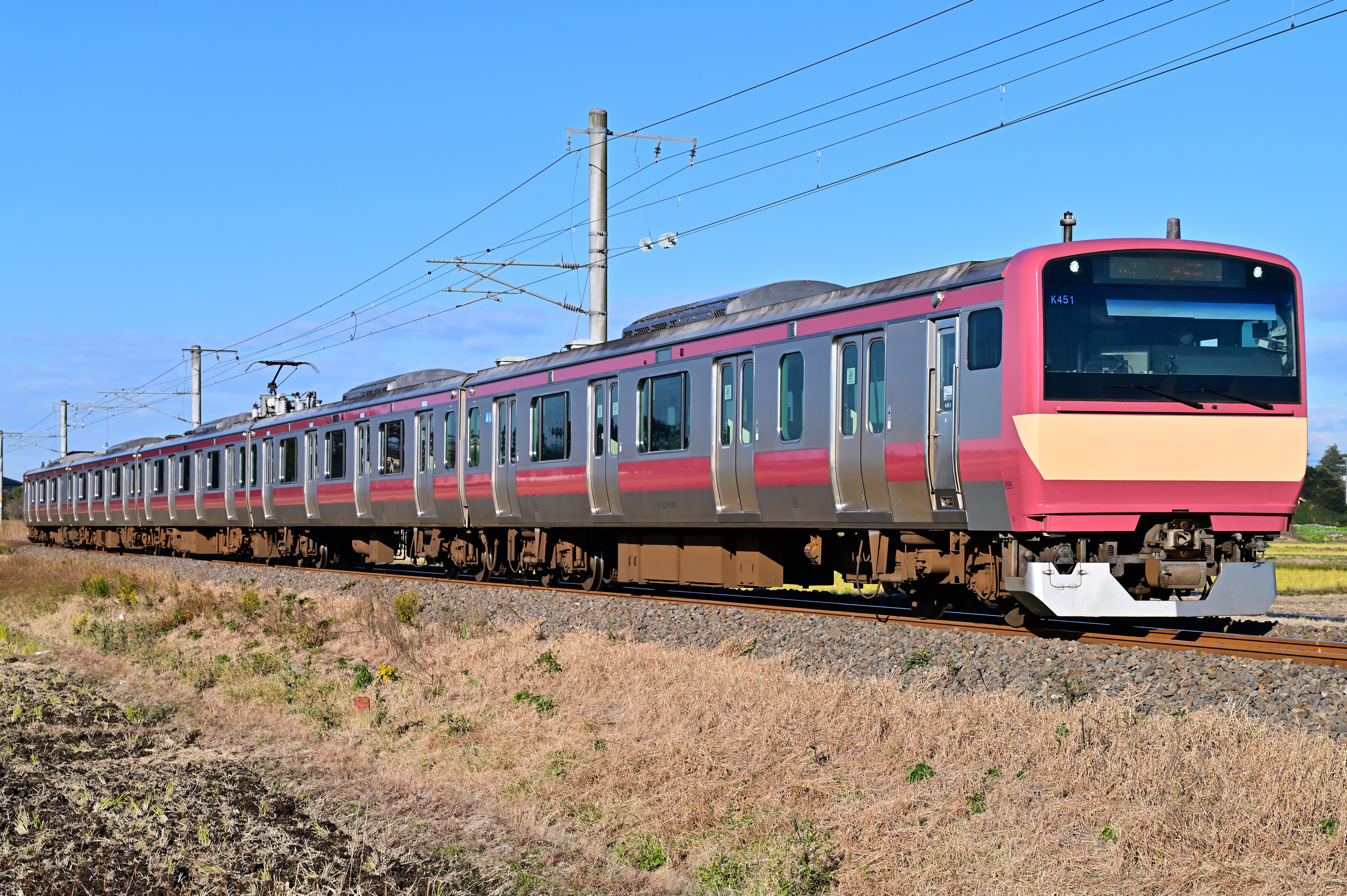
Set K451 in November 2021

To celebrate the 60th anniversary of the Katsuta Depot, set K451 entered service on 5 November 2021 in a wrapping reminiscent of the livery of the 401 series trains. Set K423 also received this wrapping in March 2023. The two sets are scheduled to carry this livery until the first quarter of 2026.
