= Niihari Station =

Railway station in Chikusei, Ibaraki Prefecture, Japan

Niihari Station 新治駅
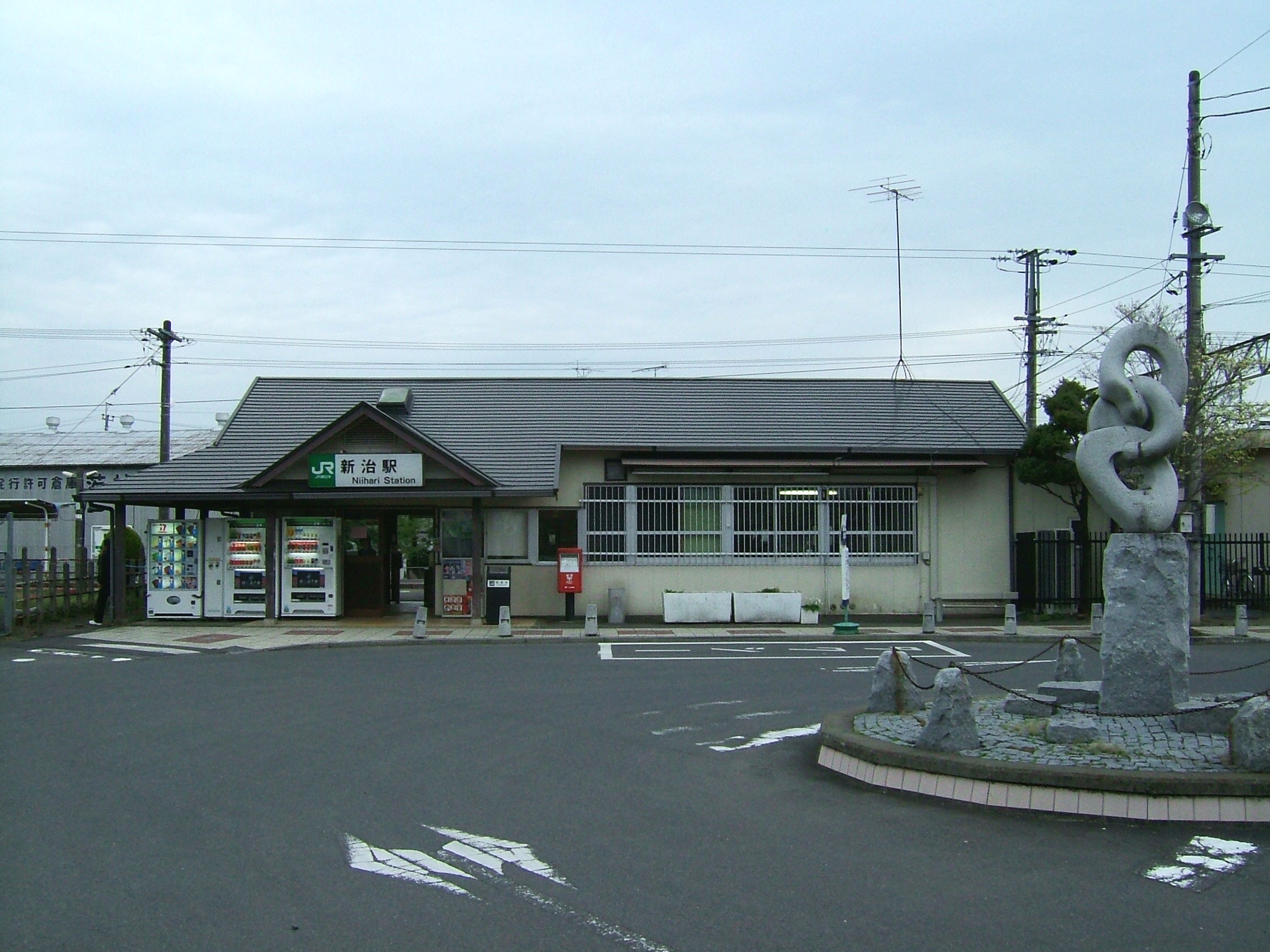
- Niihari Station, April 2008

General information
- Location: Niihari 2003-3, Chikusei-shi, Ibaraki-ken 309-1106; Japan
- Coordinates: 36.3280°N 140.0393°E
- Operator: JR East
- Line: ■ Mito Line
- Distance: 22.3 km from Oyama
- Platforms: 1 side + 1 island platform

Other information
- Status: Unstaffed
- Website: Official website

History
- Opened: 25 September 1895

Passengers
- FY2019: 581 daily

Services
Preceding station	JR East	Following station
Shimodate towards Oyama	Mito Line	Yamato towards Mito
Location
- Location within Ibaraki Prefecture Location within Japan

Niihari Station (新治駅, Niihari-eki) is a passenger railway station in the city of Chikusei, Ibaraki, Japan, operated by East Japan Railway Company (JR East).

== Lines ==
Niihari Station is served by the Mito Line, and is located 22.3 km from the official starting point of the line at Oyama Station.

== Station layout ==
The station consists of one side platform and one island platform connected to the station building by a footbridge. The station is unattended.

=== Platforms ===
1	■ Mito Line	for Tomobe and Mito
2, 3	■ Mito Line	for Shimodate and Oyama

== History ==
Niihari Station was opened on 25 September 1895. The station was absorbed into the JR East network upon the privatization of the Japanese National Railways (JNR) on 1 April 1987.

== Passenger statistics ==
In fiscal 2019, the station was used by an average of 581 passengers daily (boarding passengers only).

== Surrounding area ==
- former Kyowa Town Hall
- Kyowa Post Office

== See also ==
- List of railway stations in Japan
