= Kasama, Ibaraki =

Kasama 笠間市
- City
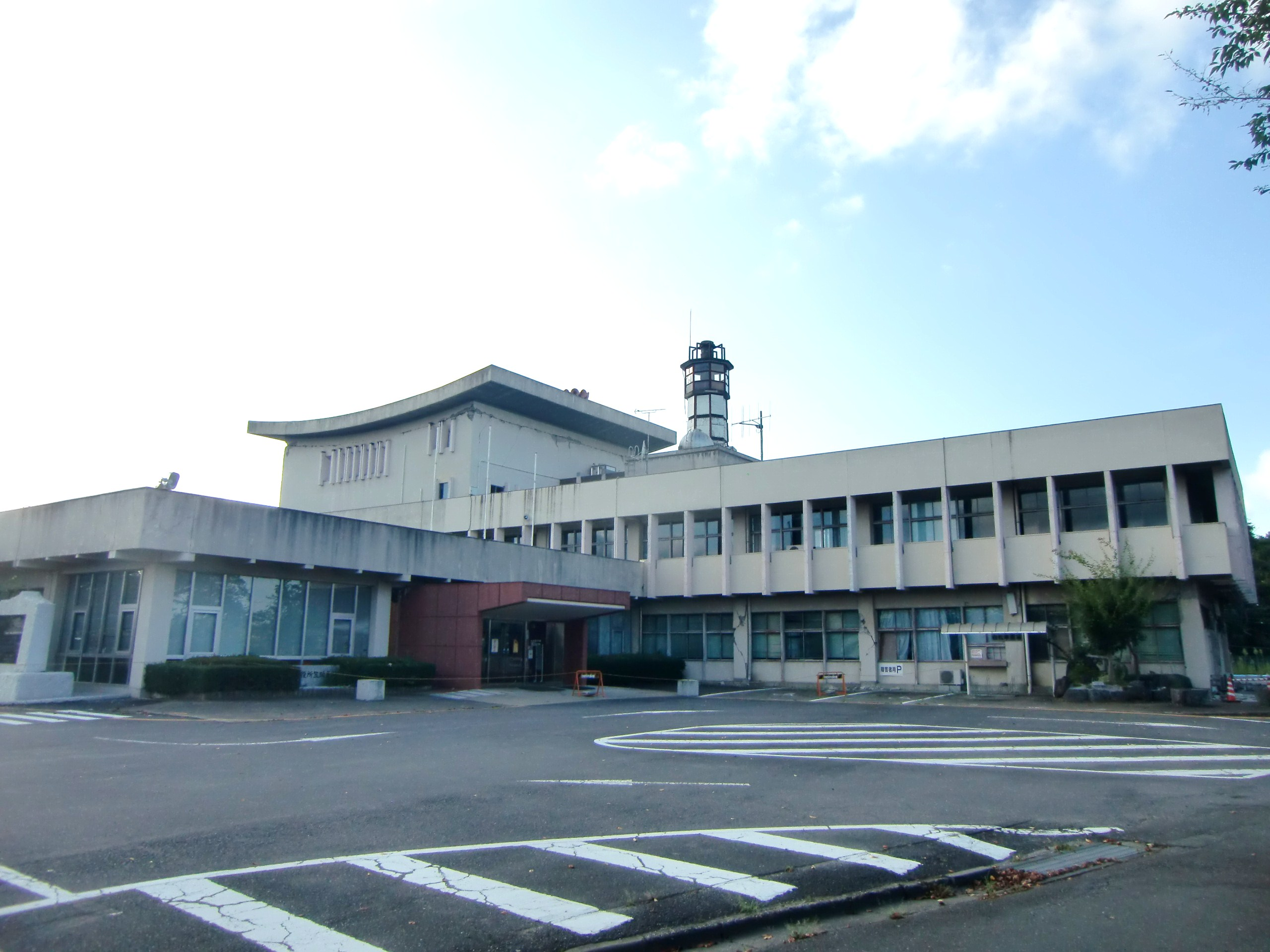
- Kasama city hall

- Flag Seal

- Location of Kasama in Ibaraki Prefecture

- Coordinates: 36°20′42.6″N 140°18′15.5″E
- Country: Japan
- Region: Kantō
- Prefecture: Ibaraki

Area
  - Total: 240.40 km^{2} (92.82 sq mi)

Population (October 2020)
  - Total: 73,664
  - Density: 306.42/km^{2} (793.63/sq mi)
- Time zone: UTC+9 (Japan Standard Time)
- Phone number: 0296-77-1101
- Address: 3-2-1 Kasama-chuo, Kasama-shi, Ibaraki Prefecture 309-1792
- Climate: Cfa
- Website: Official website
- Symbols
- Bird: Japanese bush warbler
- Flower: Chrysanthemum
- Tree: Sakura

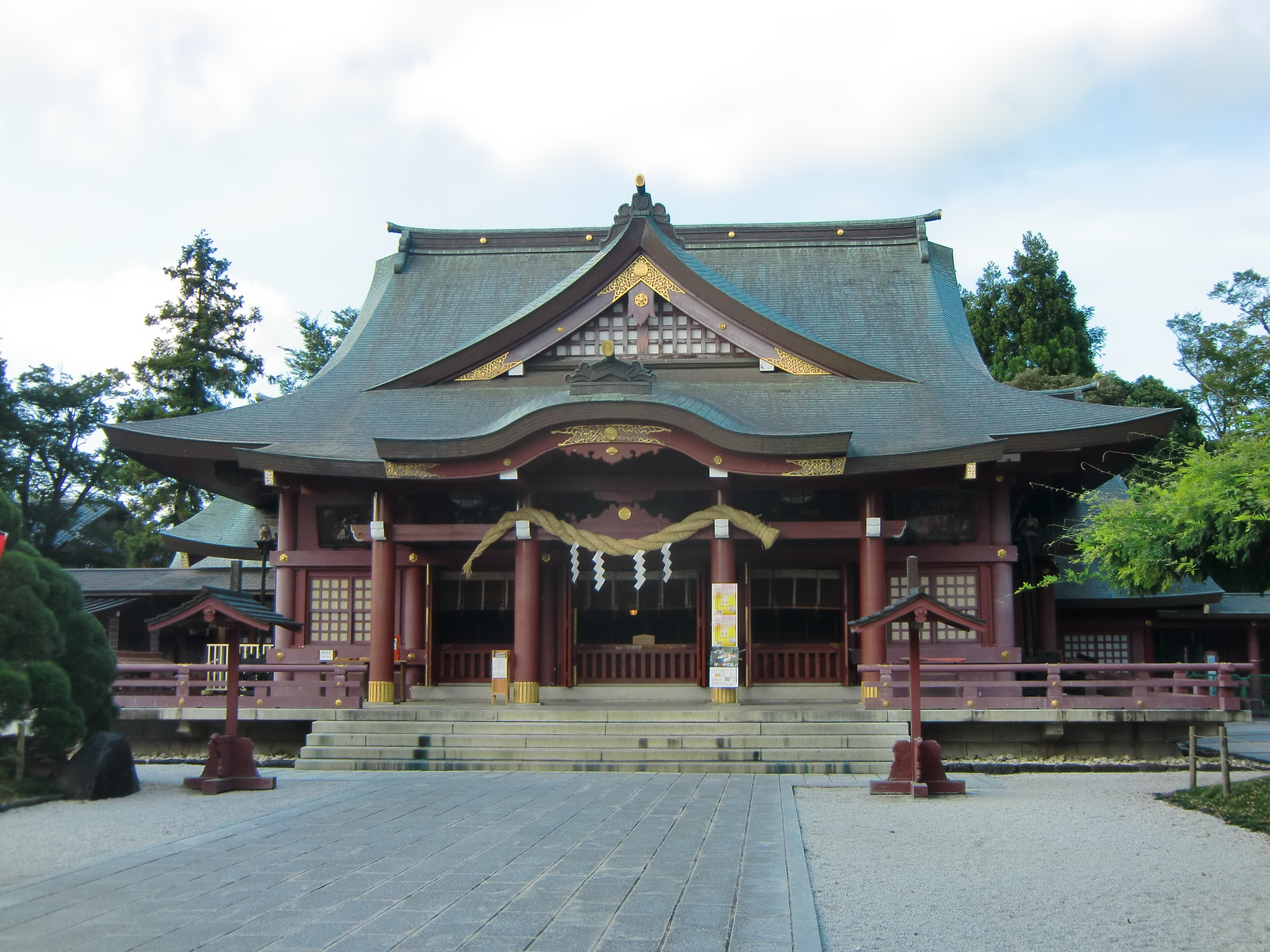
Kasama Inari Jinja

Kasama (笠間市, Kasama-shi) is a city located in Ibaraki Prefecture, Japan. Kasama is the home of Kasama ware and known for Japanese chestnuts. As of 1 July 2020, the city had an estimated population of 73,805 in 29,362 households and a population density of 307 persons per km². The percentage of the population aged over 65 was 32.2%. The total area of the city is 240.400 square kilometres (92.819 sq mi).

== Geography ==
Kasama is located in the central Ibaraki Prefecture, bordering on Tochigi Prefecture to its extreme northwest. Kasama is surrounded by mountains on all sides.

=== Surrounding municipalities ===
Ibaraki Prefecture

- Ibaraki
- Ishioka
- Mito
- Omitama
- Sakuragawa
- Shirosato

Tochigi Prefecture

- Motegi

=== Climate ===
Kasama has a humid subtropical climate (Köppen Cfa) characterized by hot summers and mild winters with rare snowfall. The average annual temperature in Kasama is 13.8 °C (56.8 °F). The average annual rainfall is 1,383.1 mm (54.45 in) with September as the wettest month. The temperatures are highest on average in August, at around 25.6 °C (78.1 °F), and lowest in January, at around 2.4 °C (36.3 °F).

Climate data for Kasama (1991−2020 normals, extremes 1978−present)
Month	Jan	Feb	Mar	Apr	May	Jun	Jul	Aug	Sep	Oct	Nov	Dec	Year
Record high °C (°F)	17.9 (64.2)	23.6 (74.5)	26.0 (78.8)	31.2 (88.2)	34.4 (93.9)	35.3 (95.5)	38.2 (100.8)	38.2 (100.8)	36.8 (98.2)	33.4 (92.1)	25.1 (77.2)	25.0 (77.0)	38.2 (100.8)
Mean daily maximum °C (°F)	9.2 (48.6)	10.0 (50.0)	13.3 (55.9)	18.6 (65.5)	23.0 (73.4)	25.5 (77.9)	29.5 (85.1)	30.9 (87.6)	27.2 (81.0)	21.7 (71.1)	16.5 (61.7)	11.5 (52.7)	19.7 (67.5)
Daily mean °C (°F)	2.4 (36.3)	3.3 (37.9)	6.9 (44.4)	12.1 (53.8)	17.0 (62.6)	20.5 (68.9)	24.4 (75.9)	25.6 (78.1)	22.0 (71.6)	16.2 (61.2)	10.1 (50.2)	4.7 (40.5)	13.8 (56.8)
Mean daily minimum °C (°F)	−3.4 (25.9)	−2.6 (27.3)	0.7 (33.3)	5.8 (42.4)	11.6 (52.9)	16.4 (61.5)	20.6 (69.1)	21.7 (71.1)	17.9 (64.2)	11.5 (52.7)	4.6 (40.3)	−1.0 (30.2)	8.6 (47.6)
Record low °C (°F)	−13.3 (8.1)	−10.9 (12.4)	−7.2 (19.0)	−3.9 (25.0)	0.4 (32.7)	7.5 (45.5)	11.5 (52.7)	12.6 (54.7)	6.3 (43.3)	−0.1 (31.8)	−4.6 (23.7)	−8.0 (17.6)	−13.3 (8.1)
Average precipitation mm (inches)	50.2 (1.98)	49.5 (1.95)	97.6 (3.84)	122.0 (4.80)	138.3 (5.44)	143.3 (5.64)	161.4 (6.35)	128.8 (5.07)	190.0 (7.48)	180.7 (7.11)	76.0 (2.99)	45.3 (1.78)	1,383.1 (54.45)
Average precipitation days (≥ 1.0 mm)	4.7	5.4	9.5	10.2	11.0	12.5	12.4	9.4	11.3	10.6	6.9	5.2	109.1
Mean monthly sunshine hours	205.7	188.5	192.5	190.7	193.4	135.3	151.7	179.6	136.9	144.6	162.0	184.0	2,063.7
Source: Japan Meteorological Agency

== Demographics ==
Per Japanese census data, the population of Kasama peaked around the year 2000 and has declined slightly since.

Historical population
Year	Pop.	±%
1950	67,832	—
1960	64,806	−4.5%
1970	65,105	+0.5%
1980	73,070	+12.2%
1990	77,782	+6.4%
2000	82,358	+5.9%
2010	79,409	−3.6%
2020	73,173	−7.9%

== History ==
Kasama was once a castle town for Kasama Domain and post-station during the Edo period Tokugawa Shogunate. It continued to prosper as a shrine town of Kasama Inari Shrine in the Meiji period (1868–1912). Stone quarrying was its main activity. Utensils for the Japanese tea ceremony, flower vases, and sake containers made from the Kasama ware pottery contributed to the economy. After the Meiji Restoration, the town of Kasama was established with the creation of the modern municipalities system on April 1, 1889, within Nishiibaraki District. The town of Shishido, a former castle town of Shishido Domain, was likewise established within Nishiibaraki District on the same day. In 1955, Shishido merged with the neighboring villages of Kitakawane and Obara to form the town of Tomobe. Kasama was elevated to city status on August 1, 1958.

On March 19, 2006, Kasama absorbed the towns of Tomobe and Iwama (both from Nishiibaraki District), and the new city hall was located at the former Tomobe Town Hall. Tomobe became the new city's administrative center, since it was more populous than the former Kasama town.

The former town of Iwama is known for having been the residence of Ueshiba Morihei, founder of Aikido, from 1942 until his death. Popular singer and songwriter Sakamoto Kyu also lived in Kasama as a child. Twice daily, chimes announce the time of day to the tune of his songs. His song "Ue o muite arukō" also plays at Tomobe train station to announce departures.

== Government ==
Kasama has a mayor-council form of government with a directly elected mayor and a unicameral city council of 22 members. Kasama contributes two members to the Ibaraki Prefectural Assembly. In terms of national politics, the city is split between the Ibaraki 1st district and the Ibaraki 2nd district of the lower house of the Diet of Japan.

== Economy ==
Kasama has a mixed industrial base of light manufacturing and food processing. The main agricultural crops are rice and chestnuts. The area is also famous for stone quarrying of a form of granite called mikage-ishi, widely used in construction and for grave stones.

== Education ==
Kasama has ten public elementary schools and five public middle schools operated by the city government, and two public high schools operated by the Ibaraki Prefectural Board of Education.

== Transportation ==
=== Railway ===
JR East – Jōban Line

- Iwama - Tomobe

JR East – Mito Line

- Fukuhara - Inada - Kasama - Shishido - Tomobe

=== Highway ===
- Jōban Expressway – Iwama Interchange, Tomobe Junction
- Kita-Kantō Expressway – Kasama-Nishi Interchange, Kasama Parking Area, Tomobe Interchange, Tomobe Junction
- National Route 50
- National Route 355

== Local attractions ==
- Ruins of Kasama Castle
- Kasama Inari Shrine, one of the main Inari shrines in Japan
- Shofuku-ji, one of the Bandō Sanjūsankasho temples
- Shishido Jin’ya
- Kasama Nichido Museum of Art (笠間日動美術館) which opened on November 11, 1972 houses a collection which includes Degas, Van Gogh, and Warhol.
- Ibaraki Prefectural Ceramics Museum
- Kasama-yaki ceramics
- The house of calligrapher and ceramicist Kitaoji Rosanjin (北大路魯山人) is located in Kasama, and it has become a museum.

== Notable people from Kasama ==
- Kimura Buzan, Nihonga painter
- Nasa Hataoka, professional golfer
- Yamashita Rin, female icon painter
- Morihiro Saito, aikido teacher
- Zatoichi, fictional blind masseuse swordsman
