= Inada Station =

Railway station in Kasama, Ibaraki Prefecture, Japan

Inada Station 稲田駅
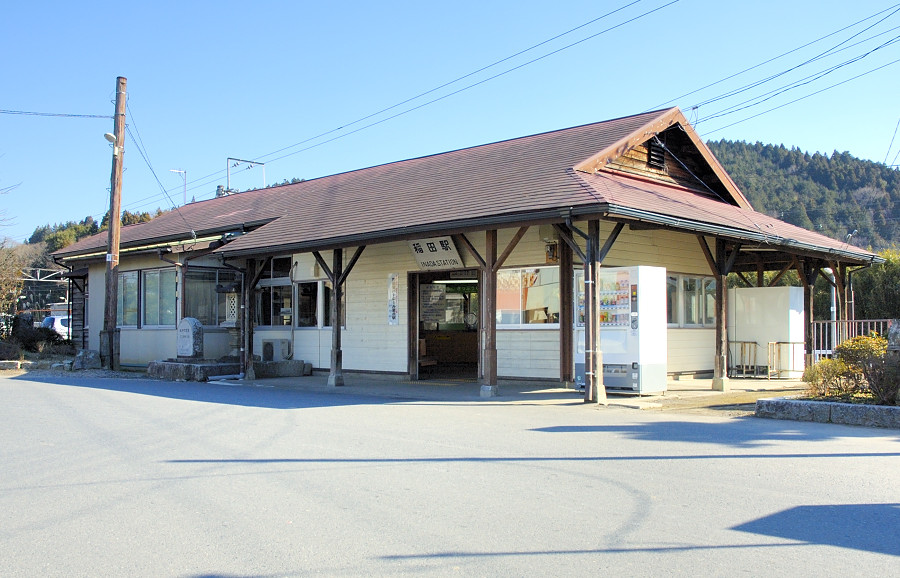
- Inada Station, January 2007

General information
- Location: 2333 Inada, Kasama-shi, Ibaraki-ken 309–1635; Japan
- Coordinates: 36.3689°N 140.2148°E
- Operator: JR East
- Line: ■ Mito Line
- Distance: 40.1 km from Oyama
- Platforms: 2 side platforms

Other information
- Status: Staffed
- Website: Official website

History
- Opened: 8 May 1898

Passengers
- FY2019: 147 daily

Services
| Preceding station | JR East | Following station |
|---|---|---|
| Fukuhara towards Oyama | Mito Line | Kasama towards Mito |
Location
- Location within Ibaraki Prefecture Location within Japan

Inada Station (稲田駅, Inada-eki) is a passenger railway station in the city of Kasama, Ibaraki, Japan, operated by East Japan Railway Company (JR East).

== Lines ==
Inada Station is served by the Mito Line, and is located 40.1 km from the official starting point of the line at Oyama Station.

== Station layout ==
The station consists of two side platforms serving two tracks. The platforms are connected by a footbridge. The former wooden station building was rebuilt between October 2012 and spring 2013. The station is staffed.

=== Platforms ===
| 1 | ■ Mito Line | for Tomobe and Mito |
| 2 | ■ Mito Line | for Shimodate and Oyama |

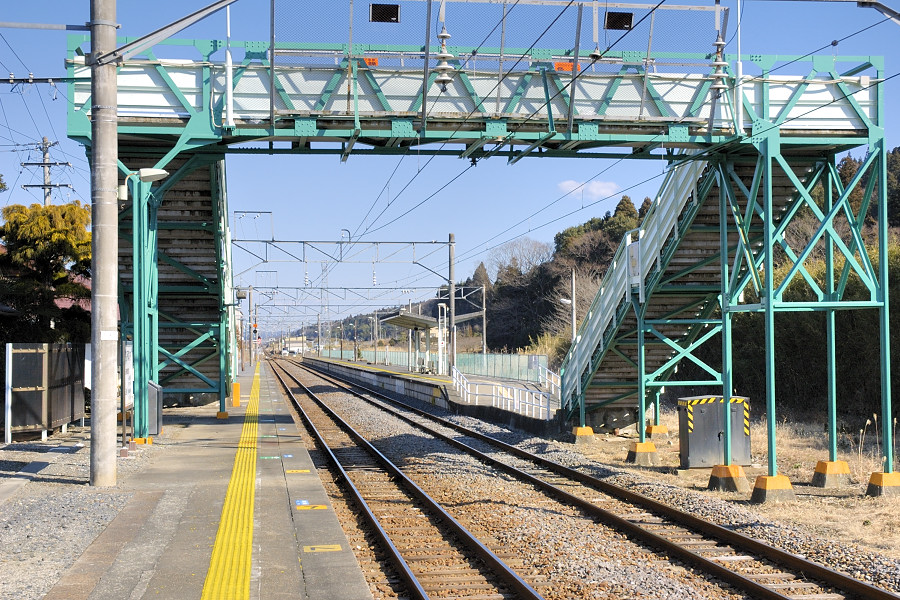
View from platform 1, January 2007

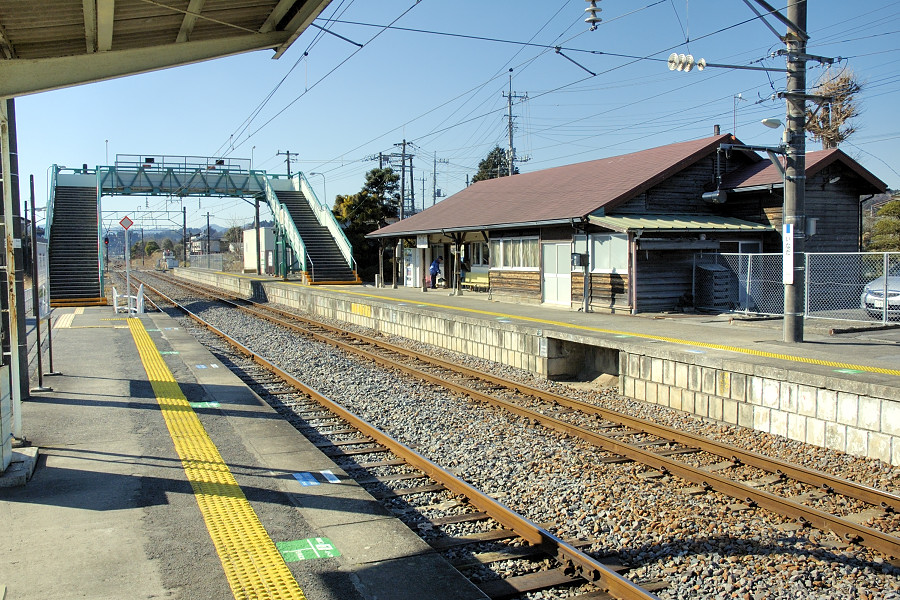
View from platform 2, January 2007

== History ==
The station opened on 8 May 1898. The station was absorbed into the JR East network upon the privatization of the Japanese National Railways (JNR) on 1 April 1987.

== Passenger statistics ==
In fiscal 2019, the station was used by an average of 147 passengers daily (boarding passengers only).

The passenger figures for previous years are as shown below.

| Fiscal year | Daily average |
|---|---|
| 2005 | 271 |
| 2010 | 232 |
| 2015 | 161 |

== Surrounding area ==
- National Route 50

== See also ==
- List of railway stations in Japan
