= Iwase Station =

Railway station in Sakuragawa, Ibaraki Prefecture, Japan

Iwase Station 岩瀬駅
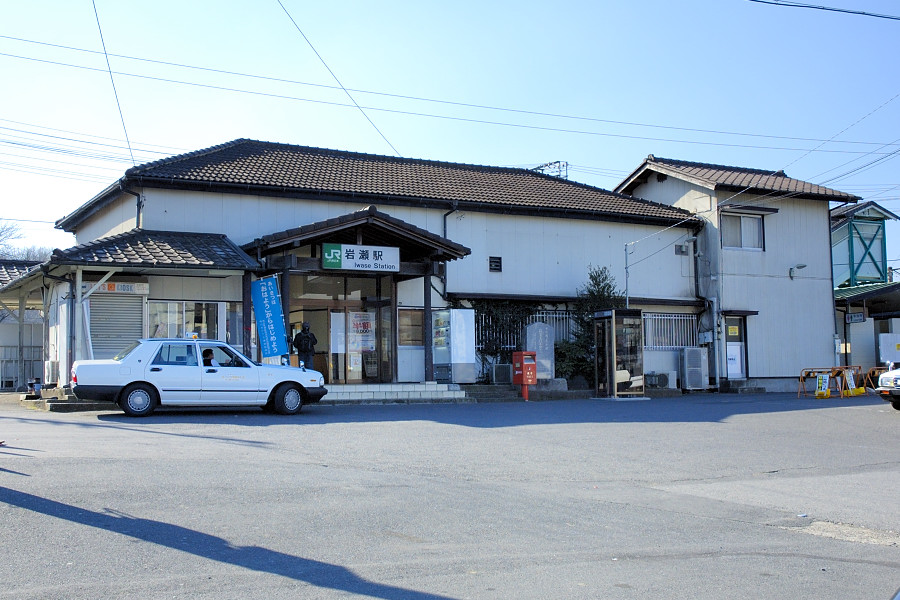
- Iwase Station, April 2008

General information
- Location: Ōta 1365, Sakuragawa, Ibaraki-ken 309-1217; Japan
- Coordinates: 36.3594°N 140.1088°E
- Operator: JR East
- Line: ■ Mito Line
- Distance: 29.6 km from Oyama
- Platforms: 1 side + 1island platform

Other information
- Status: Staffed
- Website: Official website

History
- Opened: 16 January 1889

Passengers
- FY2019: 918 daily

Services
Preceding station	JR East	Following station
Yamato towards Oyama	Mito Line	Haguro towards Mito
Location
- Location within Ibaraki Prefecture Location within Japan

Iwase Station (岩瀬駅, Iwase-eki) is a passenger railway station in the city of Sakuragawa, Ibaraki, Japan, operated by East Japan Railway Company (JR East).

== Lines ==
Iwase Station is served by the Mito Line, and is located 29.6 km from the official starting point of the line at Oyama Station.

== Station layout ==
The station consists of one side platform and one island platform, connected to the station building by a footbridge. The station is staffed

=== Platforms ===
1	■ Mito Line	for Tomobe and Mito
2, 3	■ Mito Line	for Shimodate and Oyama

== History ==
Iwase Station was opened on 16 January 1889. From 1918 to 1987 it was also a terminal station for the now defunct Tsukuba Railway Tsukuba Line. The station was absorbed into the JR East network upon the privatization of the Japanese National Railways (JNR) on 1 April 1987.

== Passenger statistics ==
In fiscal 2019, the station was used by an average of 918 passengers daily (boarding passengers only).

== Surrounding area ==
- former Iwase Town Hall
- Iwase Post Office

== See also ==
- List of railway stations in Japan
