= Mito Line =

Japanese railway line

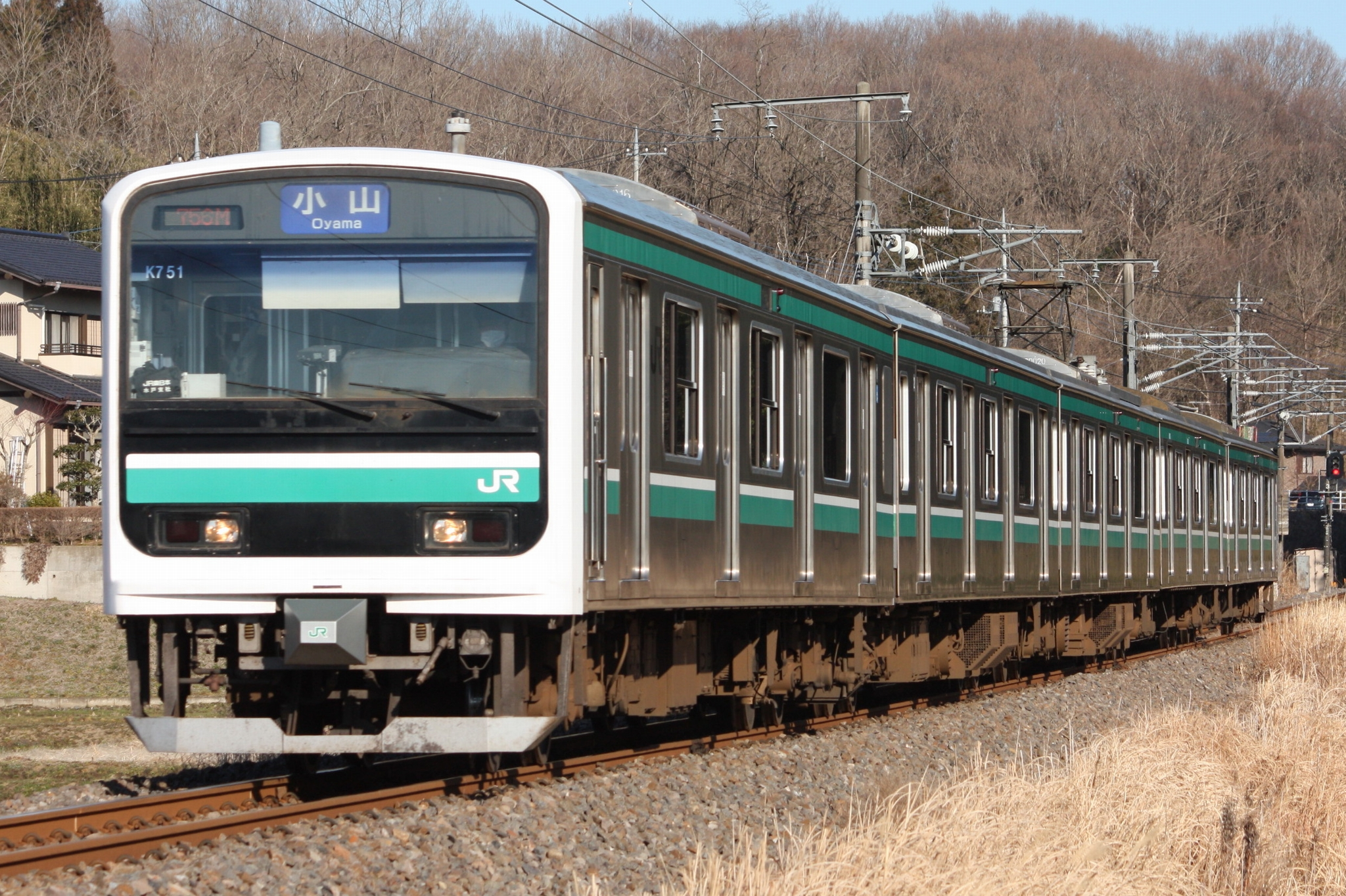
- An E501 series EMU between Kasama and Shishido stations in March 2014

Overview
- Native name: 水戸線
- Status: Operational
- Locale: Tochigi, Ibaraki prefectures
- Termini: Oyama; Tomobe
- Stations: 16

Service
- Type: Heavy rail
- Operator: JR East
- Rolling stock: E501 series/E531 series EMUs

History
- Opened: 16 January 1889; 137 years ago

Technical
- Line length: 50.2 km (31.2 mi)
- Track gauge: 1,067 mm (3 ft 6 in)
- Electrification: Overhead line: 1,500 V DC (around Oyama); 20 kV 50 Hz AC (Otabayashi–Tomobe)
Route map

The Mito Line (水戸線, Mito-sen) is a railway line connecting Oyama Station in Tochigi Prefecture and Tomobe Station in Ibaraki Prefecture, Japan. The line is 50.2 km (31.2 mi) long and is owned and operated by the East Japan Railway Company (JR East).

Joban Line E501 series and E531 series ten car sets continue on to Iwaki, Fukushima while the 5 car sets go to Oyama. They separate at Tomobe.

Services are often run as one-man trains.

== Station list ==
- All trains stop at every station.
- Trains can pass one another at stations marked "◇" and "∨" and cannot pass at stations marked "｜".

| Station | Japanese | Distance (km) | | Transfers | | Location | |
| Station | Japanese | Between stations | Total | Transfers | | Location | |
|---|---|---|---|---|---|---|---|
| Oyama | 小山 | - | 0.0 | Tōhoku Shinkansen; Tōhoku Main Line (Utsunomiya Line); Shonan-Shinjuku Line ■ Ryomo Line | ∨ | Oyama | Tochigi |
| Otabayashi | 小田林 | 4.9 | 4.9 | | ｜ | Yūki | Ibaraki |
| Yūki | 結城 | 1.7 | 6.6 | | ◇ | Yūki | Ibaraki |
| Higashi-Yūki | 東結城 | 1.7 | 8.3 | | ｜ | Yūki | Ibaraki |
| Kawashima | 川島 | 2.1 | 10.4 | | ◇ | Chikusei | Ibaraki |
| Tamado | 玉戸 | 2.1 | 12.5 | | ｜ | Chikusei | Ibaraki |
| Shimodate | 下館 | 3.7 | 16.2 | ■ Moka Railway Mooka Line ■ Jōsō Line | ◇ | Chikusei | Ibaraki |
| Niihari | 新治 | 6.1 | 22.3 | | ◇ | Chikusei | Ibaraki |
| Yamato | 大和 | 3.6 | 25.9 | | ｜ | Sakuragawa | Ibaraki |
| Iwase | 岩瀬 | 3.7 | 29.6 | | ◇ | Sakuragawa | Ibaraki |
| Haguro | 羽黒 | 3.2 | 32.8 | | ◇ | Sakuragawa | Ibaraki |
| Fukuhara | 福原 | 4.2 | 37.0 | | ◇ | Kasama | Ibaraki |
| Inada | 稲田 | 3.1 | 40.1 | | ◇ | Kasama | Ibaraki |
| Kasama | 笠間 | 3.2 | 43.3 | | ◇ | Kasama | Ibaraki |
| Shishido | 宍戸 | 5.2 | 48.5 | | ｜ | Kasama | Ibaraki |
| Tomobe | 友部 | 1.7 | 50.2 | ■ Jōban Line (some through services for Mito) | ◇ | Kasama | Ibaraki |

== Rolling stock ==
- E501 series five-car EMUs
- E531 series five-car EMUs
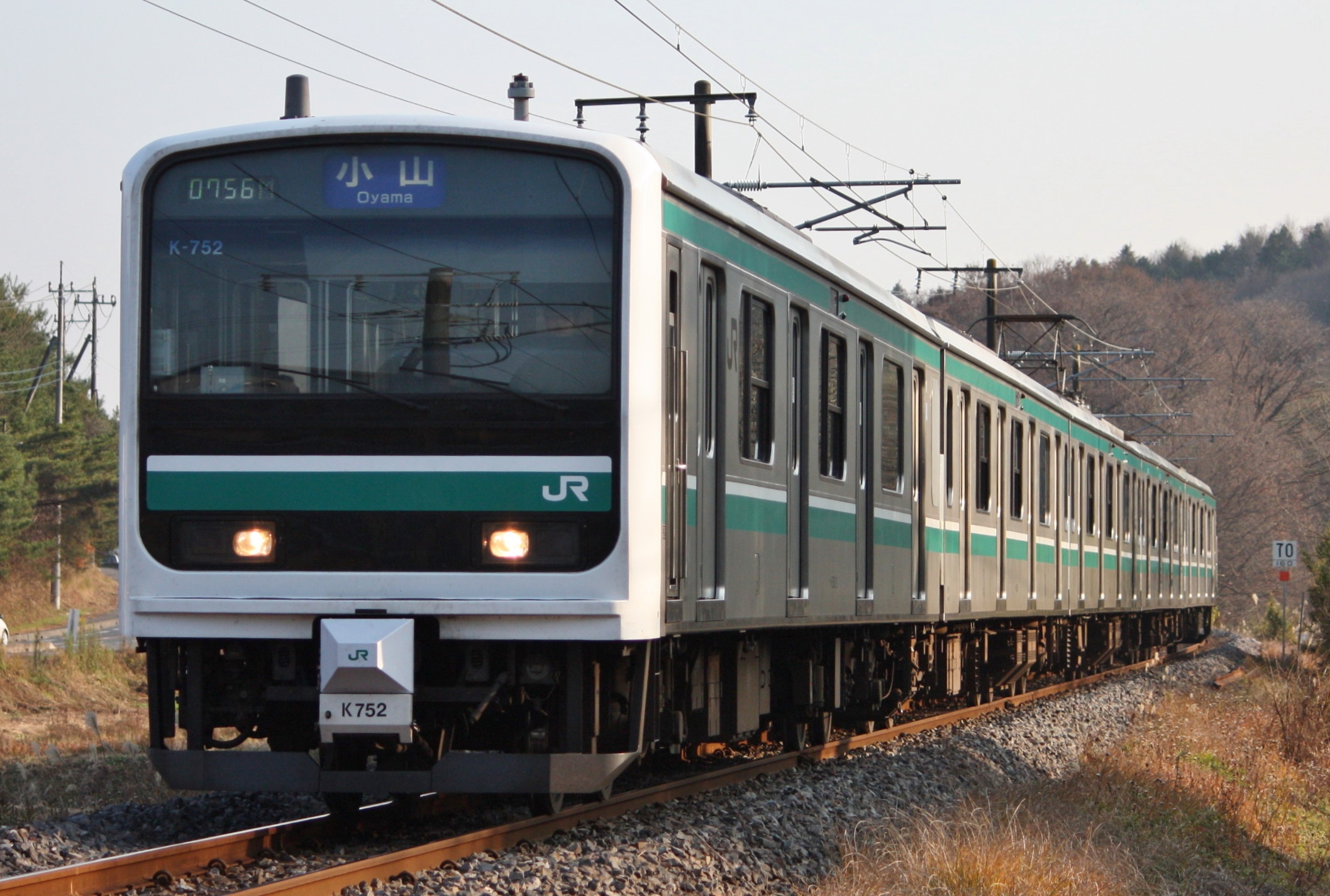
A 5-car E501 series EMU on the Mito Line in December 2008

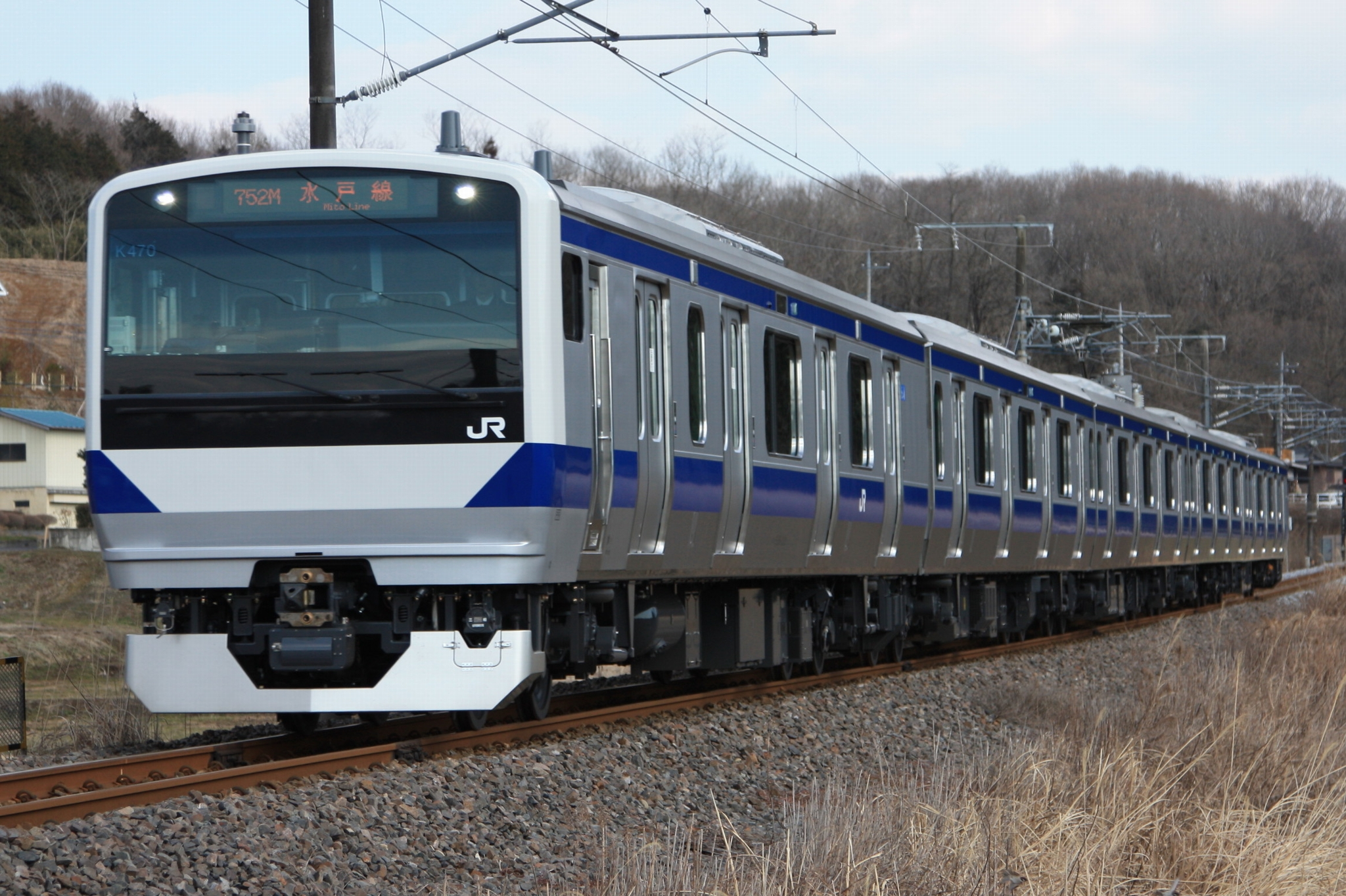
A 5-car E531 series EMU on the Mito Line in March 2015

=== Former rolling stock ===
- 415 series four-car EMUs (until March 2016)
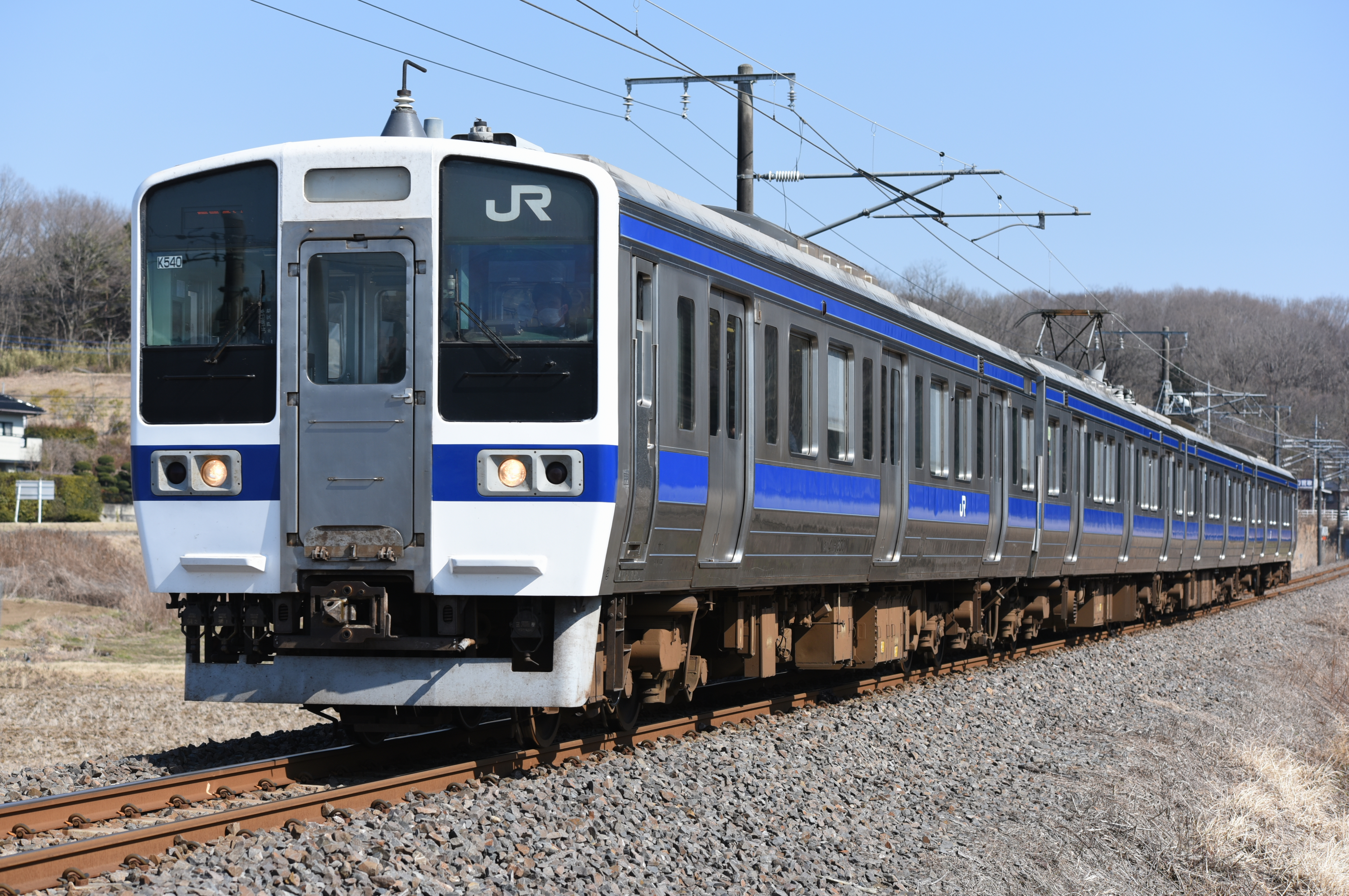
A 4-car 415-1500 series EMU on the Mito Line in March 2016

== History ==
The Mito Railway Co. opened the line on 16 January 1889 operating between Oyama and Mito Stations. On 1 March 1892, the Mito Railway Co. merged with the Nippon Railway.

On 1 July 1895, the Joban Line was opened by the Nippon Railway, joining the Mito Line at Tomobe Station. The company was nationalised in 1906.

On 12 October 1909, the Japanese Government Railways renamed the Tomobe to Mito section as part of the Joban Line, resulting in the current "Mito Line" being the section between Oyama and Tomobe.

The line was completely electrified on 1 February 1967.

=== Former connecting lines ===
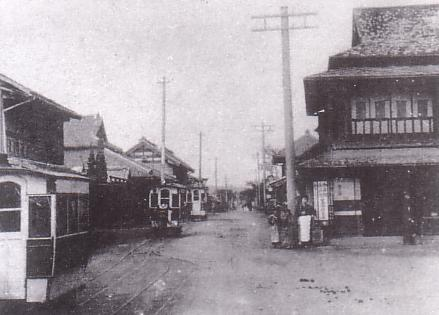
The former handcar line to Kasama Inari shrine

Kasama Station: A 1.4 km 610 mm (2 ft) gauge handcar line to the Kasama Inari shrine operated between 1915 and 1930.
