= Fukuhara Station =

Railway station in Kasama, Ibaraki Prefecture, Japan

Fukuhara Station 福原駅
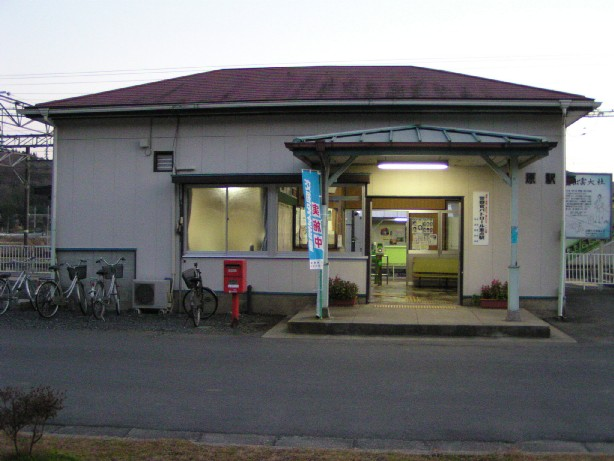
- Fukuhara Station in 2004

General information
- Location: 2144 Fukuhara, Kasama-shi, Ibaraki-ken 309–1634; Japan
- Coordinates: 36.3517°N 140.1870°E
- Operator: JR East
- Line: ■ Mito Line
- Distance: 37.0 km from Oyama
- Platforms: 1 side + 1 island platform

Other information
- Status: Staffed
- Website: Official website

History
- Opened: 1 December 1890

Passengers
- FY2019: 148 daily

Services
| Preceding station | JR East | Following station |
|---|---|---|
| Haguro towards Oyama | Mito Line | Inada towards Mito |
Location
- Location within Ibaraki Prefecture Location within Japan

Fukuhara Station (福原駅, Fukuhara-eki) is a passenger railway station in the city of Kasama, Ibaraki, Japan, operated by East Japan Railway Company (JR East).

== Lines ==
Fukuhara Station is served by the Mito Line and is located 37.0 km from the official starting point of the line at Oyama Station.

== Station layout ==
The station consists of one side platform (platform 1) and one island platform (platforms 2 and 3) serving three tracks. The platforms are connected by a footbridge. The former wooden station building was rebuilt between October 2012 and spring 2013.

=== Platforms ===
| 1 | ■ Mito Line | for Tomobe and Mito |
| 2/3 | ■ Mito Line | for Shimodate and Oyama |

== History ==
The station opened on 1 December 1890. The station was absorbed into the JR East network upon the privatization of the Japanese National Railways (JNR) on 1 April 1987.

== Passenger statistics ==
In fiscal year 2019, an average of 148 passengers boarded trains at the station daily.

The passenger figures for previous years are as shown below.

| Fiscal year | Daily average |
|---|---|
| 2005 | 198 |
| 2010 | 173 |
| 2015 | 154 |

== Surrounding area ==
- National Route 50
- Fukuhara Post Office

Fukuhara station is a terminus of the Wagakuni to Atago mountain hiking train, whose other terminus is Iwama station.

== See also ==
- List of railway stations in Japan
