= Shishido Station =

Railway station in Kasama, Ibaraki Prefecture, Japan

Shishido Station 宍戸駅
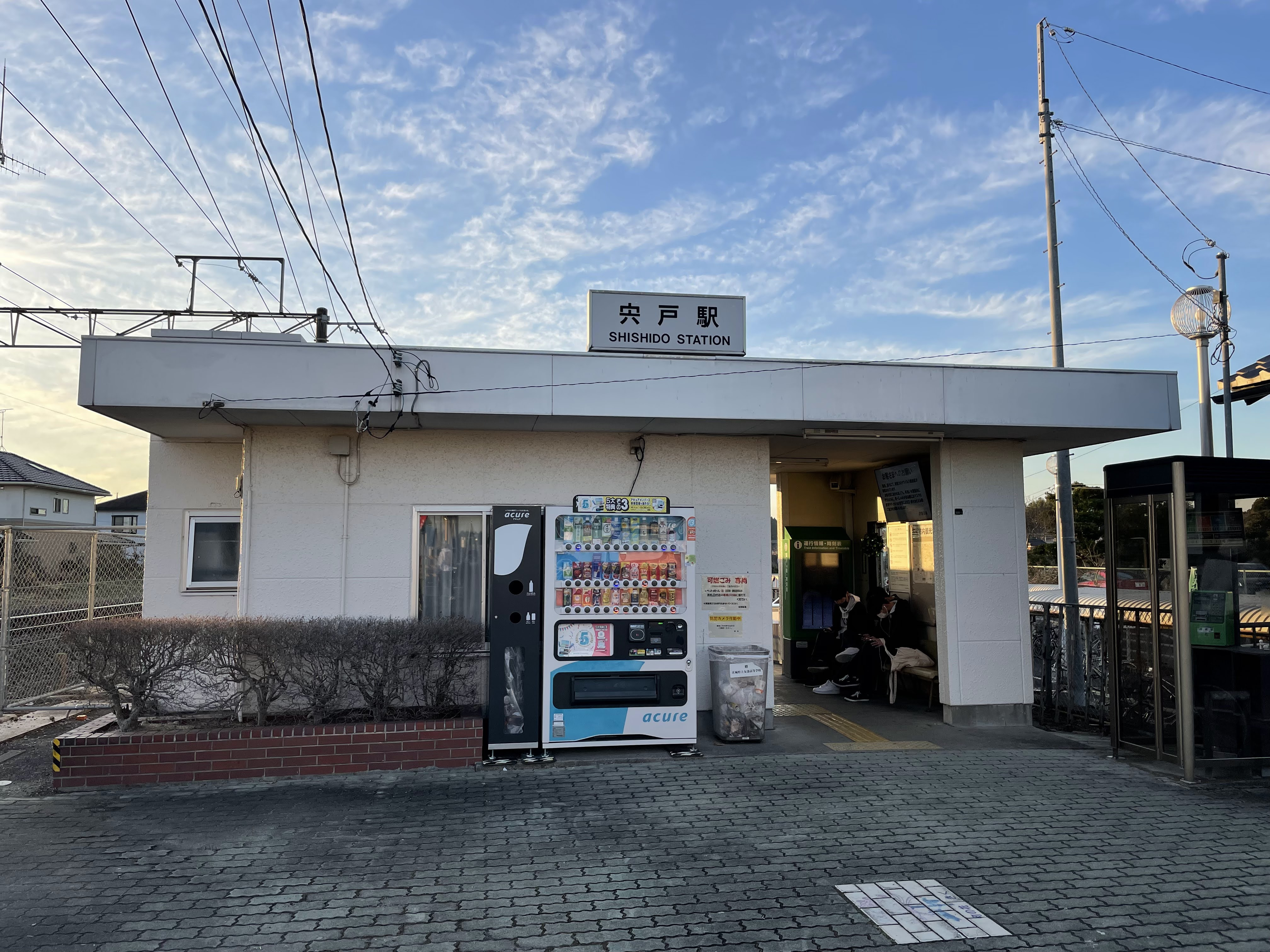
- Station building in November 2021

General information
- Location: Ōtamachi, Kasama-shi, Ibaraki-ken 309-1738; Japan
- Coordinates: 36.3450°N 140.2881°E
- Operator: JR East
- Line: ■ Mito Line
- Distance: 48.5 km from Oyama
- Platforms: 1 side platform

Other information
- Status: Staffed
- Website: Official website

History
- Opened: 16 January 1889
- Former names: Ōtamachi (renamed in 1889)

Passengers
- FY2020: 262 daily

Services
| Preceding station | JR East | Following station |
|---|---|---|
| Kasama towards Oyama | Mito Line | Tomobe towards Mito |
Location
- Location within Ibaraki Prefecture Location within Japan

Shishido Station (宍戸駅, Shishido-eki) is a passenger railway station located in the city of Kasama, Ibaraki Prefecture, Japan operated by the East Japan Railway Company (JR East).

== Lines ==
Shishido Station is served by the Mito Line, and is located 48.5 km from the official starting point of the line at Oyama Station.

== Station layout ==
The station consists of a single curved side platform serving traffic in both direction. The Station is staffed.

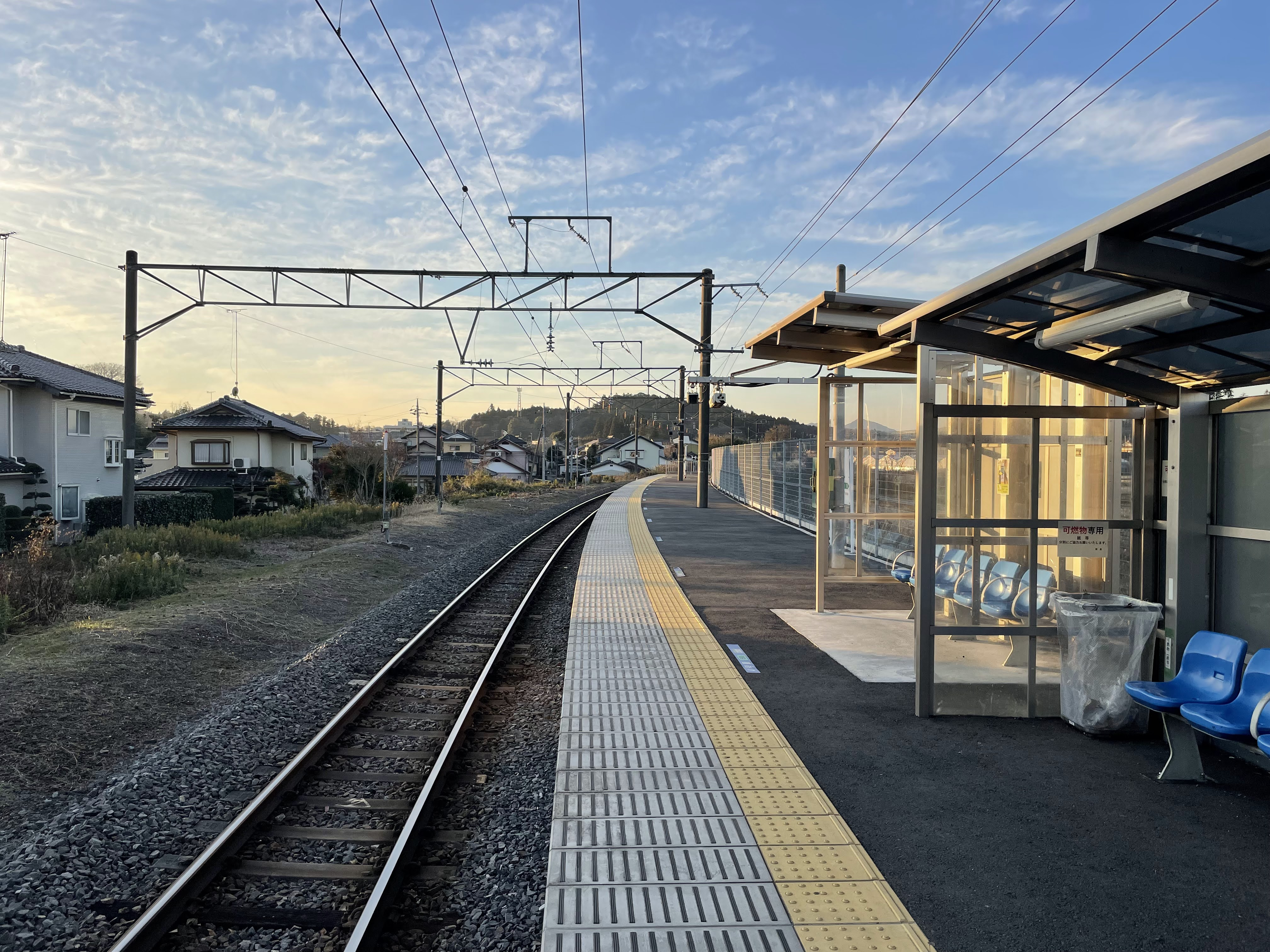
Platform for Oyama, 2021

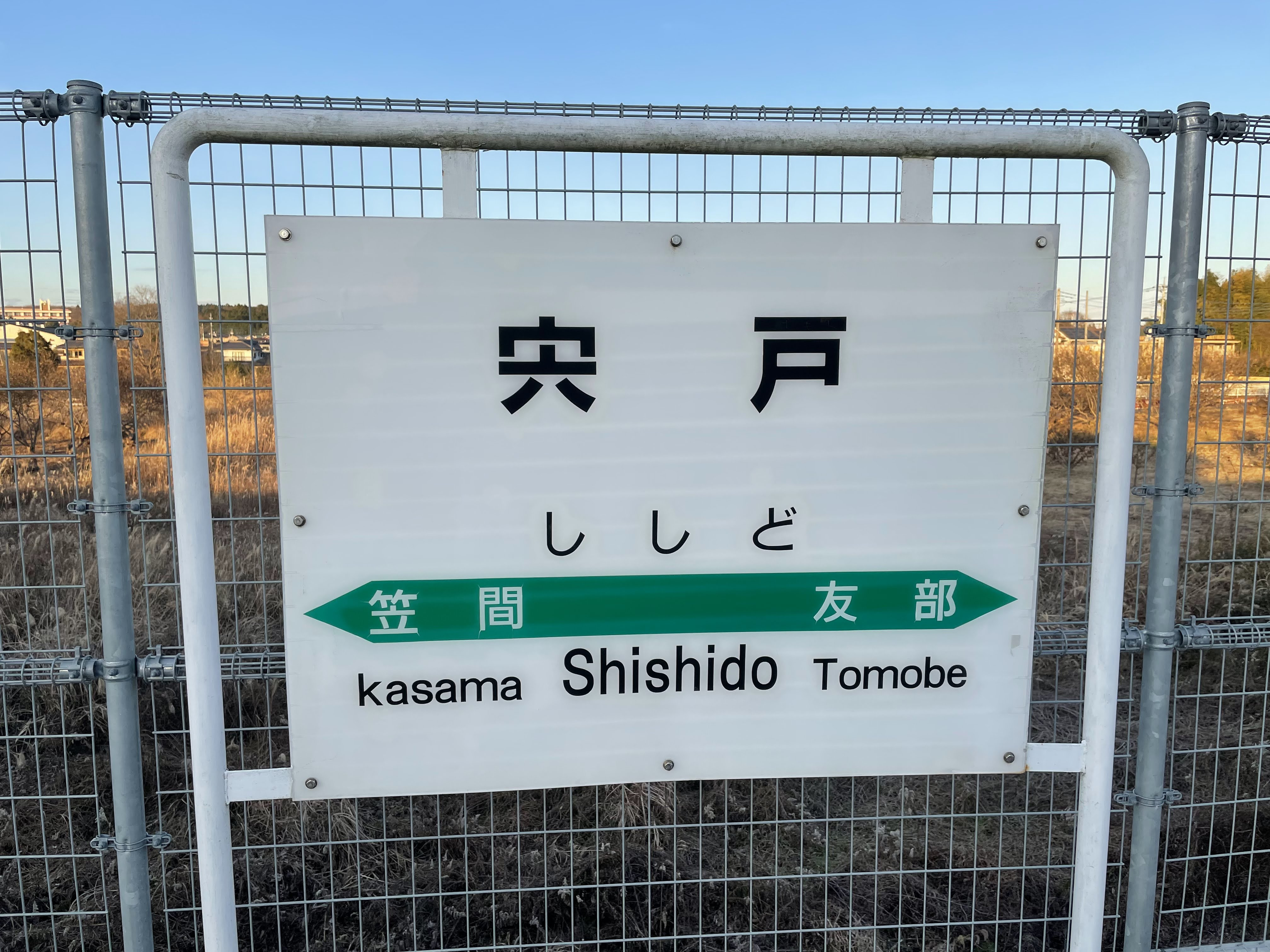
Name sign, 2021

== History ==
Shishido Station was opened on 16 January 1889 as Ōtamachi Station (太田町駅). It was renamed to its present name on 25 May 1889. The station was absorbed into the JR East network upon the privatization of the Japanese National Railways (JNR) on 1 April 1987. A new station building was completed in July 2012.

== Passenger statistics ==
In fiscal 2019, the station was used by an average of 336 passengers daily (boarding passengers only).

== Surrounding area ==
- National Route 355
- Kita-Kantō Expressway Tomobe IC
- Shishido Post Office

== See also ==
- List of railway stations in Japan
