= E501 series =

Japanese train type

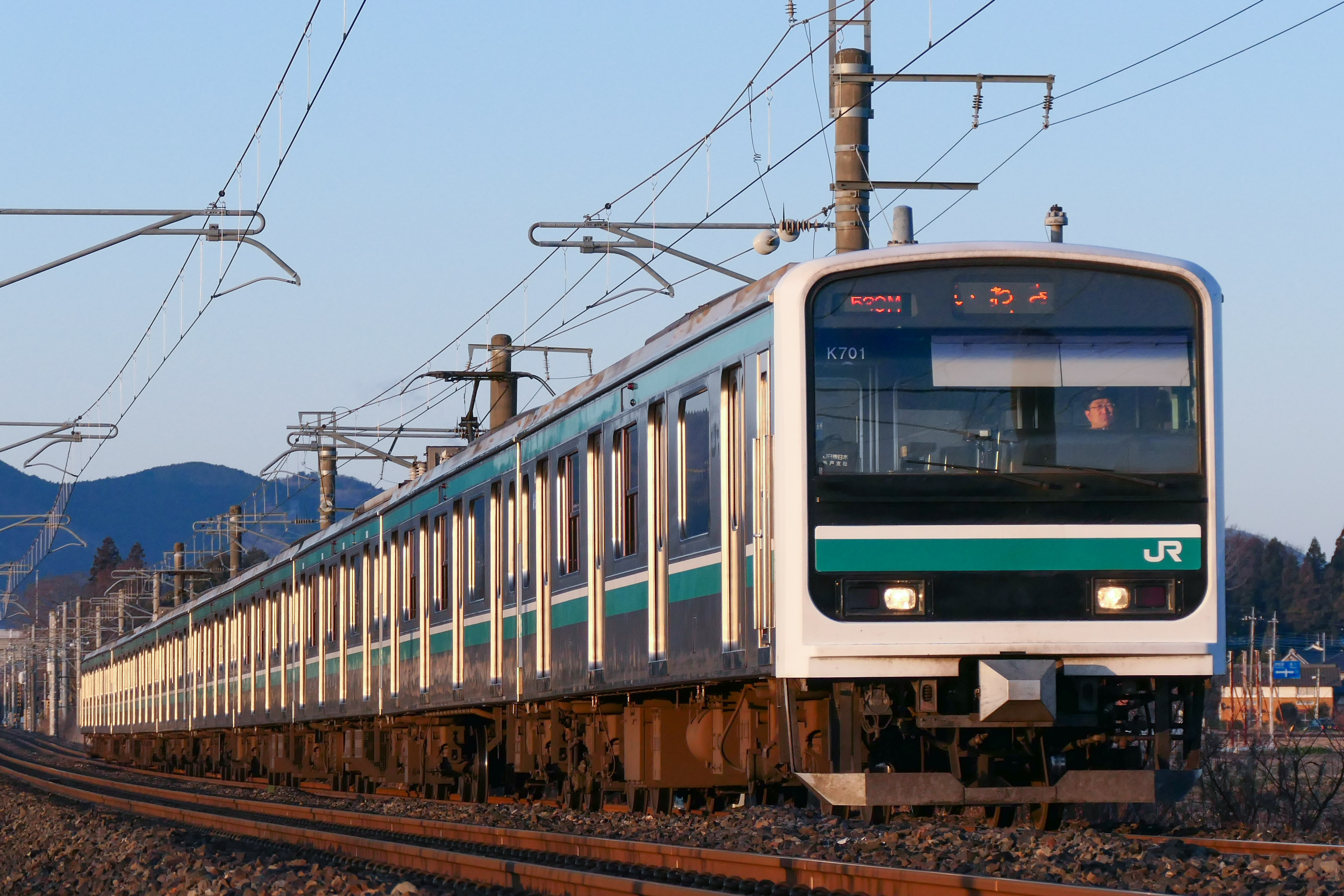
- A 10-car E501 series formation on a Jōban Line service, January 2020
- In service: 1995–Present
- Manufacturers: Kawasaki Heavy Industries, Tokyu Car Corporation
- Replaced: 401 series
- Constructed: 1995–1997
- Entered service: December 1995
- Refurbished: 2011–2012
- Scrapped: 2024–
- Number built: 60 vehicles
- Number in service: 45 vehicles (5 sets) (JR East)
- Number scrapped: 5 vehicles (1 set)
- Formation: 5/10 cars per trainset
- Fleet numbers: K701–K704, K751–K754
- Operators: JR East; JR Kyushu (future)
- Depot: Katsuta
- Lines served: ■ Jōban Line; ■ Mito Line

Specifications
- Car body construction: Stainless steel
- Car length: 20,420 mm (67 ft 0 in) (end cars); 20,000 mm (65 ft 7 in) (intermediate cars)
- Width: 2,890 mm (9 ft 6 in)
- Doors: 4 pairs per side
- Maximum speed: 120 km/h (75 mph)
- Traction system: Original: GTO–VVVF (Siemens); Current: IGBT–VVVF (Toshiba)
- Traction motors: MT70 3-phase AC induction motor
- Power output: 120 kW (161 hp) × 4 per motored car
- Transmission: Gear Ratio: 16:97
- Acceleration: 2.0 km/(h⋅s) (1.2 mph/s)
- Deceleration: 4.2 km/(h⋅s) (2.6 mph/s)
- Electric systems: 1,500 V DC / 20 kV 50 Hz AC (overhead catenary)
- Current collection: Pantograph
- Safety system: ATS-PS
- Track gauge: 1,067 mm (3 ft 6 in)

The E501 series (E501系) is a dual-voltage AC/DC electric multiple unit (EMU) train type operated on local services by East Japan Railway Company (JR East) in Japan since December 1995.

== Design ==
Built jointly by Kawasaki Heavy Industries and Tokyu Car, the design is derived from the 209 series commuter EMU, and were initially operated as 10+5-car formations on Jōban Line services out of Ueno in Tokyo, but were modified with the addition of toilets and transferred to Jōban Line and Mito Line local services in the Mito area from March 2007.

== Formations ==
=== 10-car sets ===
As of 1 October 2018, four ten-car sets (K701–K704) are based at Katsuta Depot and formed with four motored ("M") cars and six non-powered trailer ("T") cars.

	← Haranomachi Tsuchiura →									
Car No.	10	9	8	7	6	5	4	3	2	1
Designation	Tc	T	M	M'	T'	T	T	M	M'	Tc'
Numbering	KuHa E501-0	SaHa E501-0	MoHa E501-0	MoHa E500-0	SaHa E500-0	SaHa E501-0	SaHa E501-0	MoHa E501-0	MoHa E500-0	KuHa E500-1000

- Cars 3 and 8 each have one single-arm pantograph.
- Cars 1 and 10 have a wheelchair space.
- Cars 1 and 10 each have a universal design toilet.
- Car 8 is designated as a mildly air-conditioned car.

=== 5-car sets ===
As of 1 October 2018, four five-car sets (K751–K754) are based at Katsuta Depot and formed with two motored ("M") cars and three non-powered trailer ("T") cars.

	← Haranomachi Oyama, Tsuchiura →				
Car No.	5	4	3	2	1
Designation	Tc	T	M	M'	Tc'
Numbering	KuHa E501-1000	SaHa E501-0	MoHa E501-0	MoHa E500-0	KuHa E500-0

- Cars 3 has one single-arm pantograph.
- Cars 1 and 5 have a wheelchair space.
- Cars 1 has a universal design toilet.
- Car 4 is designated as a mildly air-conditioned car.

== Interior ==
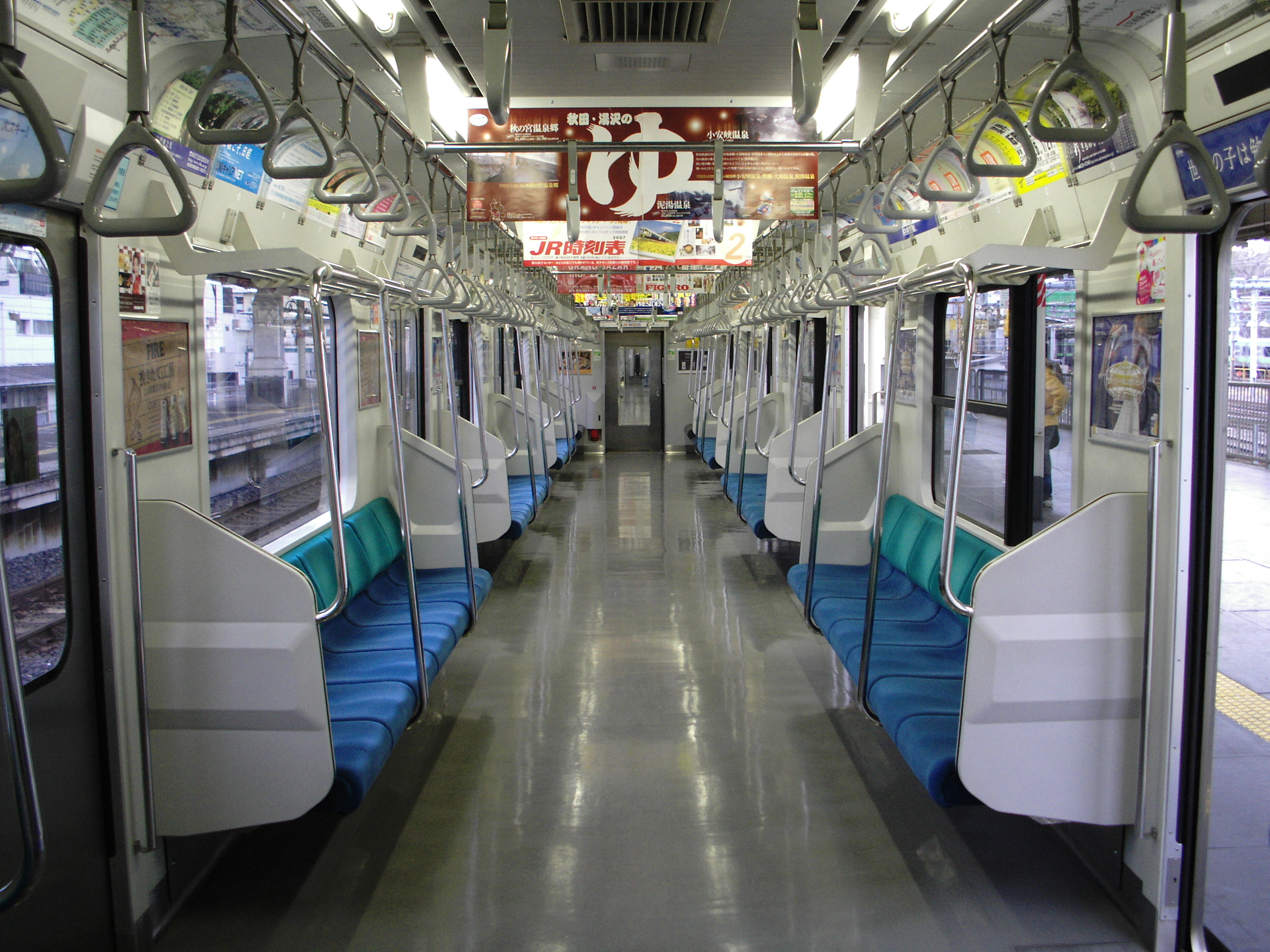
Interior view, January 2007

== History ==
The first 10+5-car train was originally scheduled to be delivered in time for entry into service from the March 1995 timetable revision, but deliveries from Kawasaki Heavy Industries in Kobe were delayed until May due to the effects of the Great Hanshin earthquake in January of that year. The first trains ultimately entered revenue service from the start of the 1 December 1995 timetable revision.

Between September and October 2006, modifications were made to the side windows to allow some windows to be opened. From October 2006, the fleet underwent modifications to add toilets, and from the start of the 18 March 2007 timetable revision, the E501 series trains were displaced from Jōban Line services out of Ueno by E531 series sets, and were transferred to local services on the Jōban Line north of Tsuchiura and on the Mito Line. Between 2011 and 2012, the fleet underwent a life-extension refurbishment programme, which involved replacing electrical and brake equipment. These trains were originally equipped with Siemens GTO-VVVF propulsion systems, which were similar to the Keikyu 2100 series and also produced a "do-re-mi-fa-so-la-ti-do" scale when starting up. As part of the refurbishment, the propulsion system was changed to Toshiba IGBT-VVVF.

Between December 2014 and December 2015, all PS29 lozenge-type pantographs were replaced with single-arm pantographs.

Scrapping of the E501 series fleet commenced in August 2024, starting with 5-car set K751.

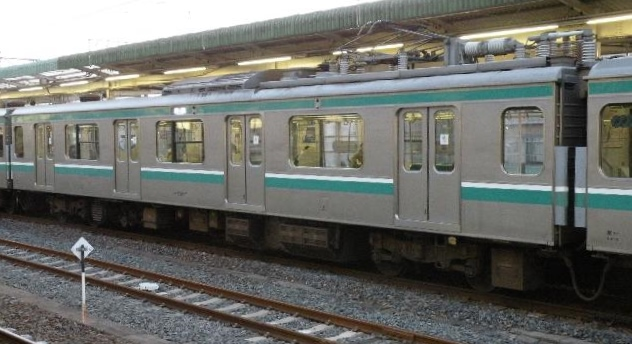
Intermediate motor car MoHa E501-7 showing the modified opening side windows, February 2009

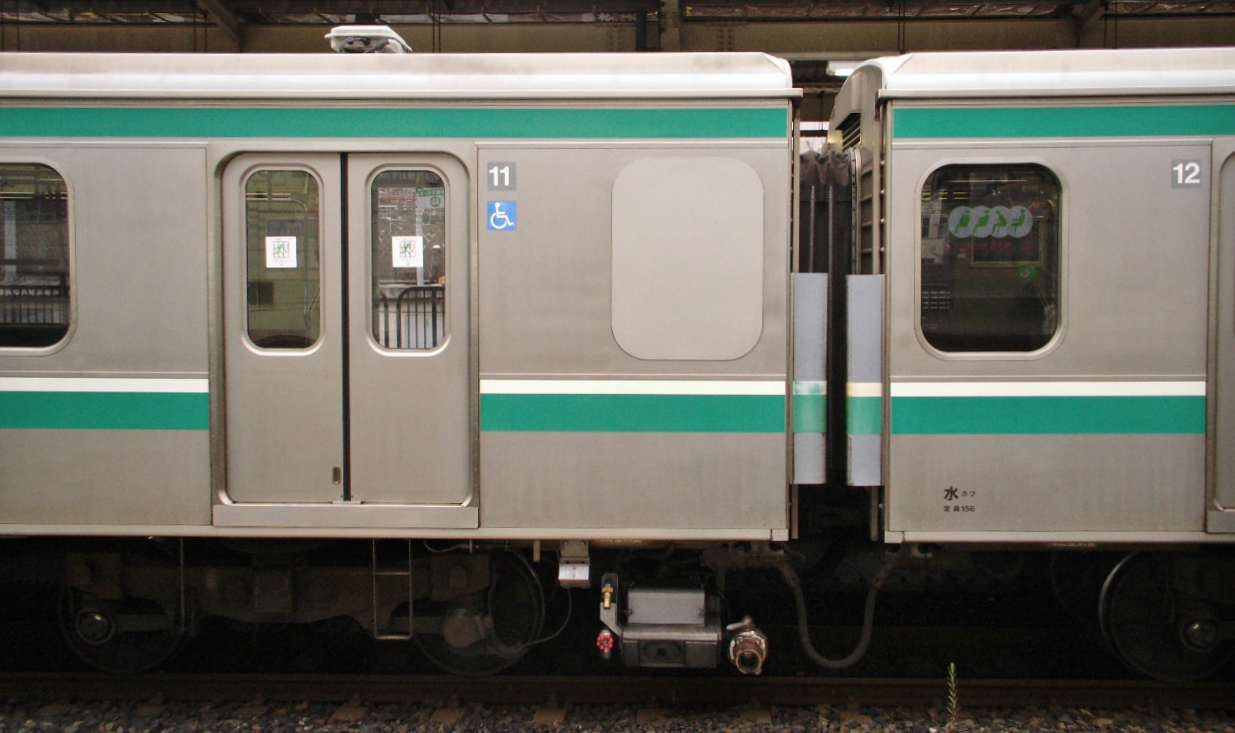
The blocked-off window next to the retro-fitted toilet, January 2007

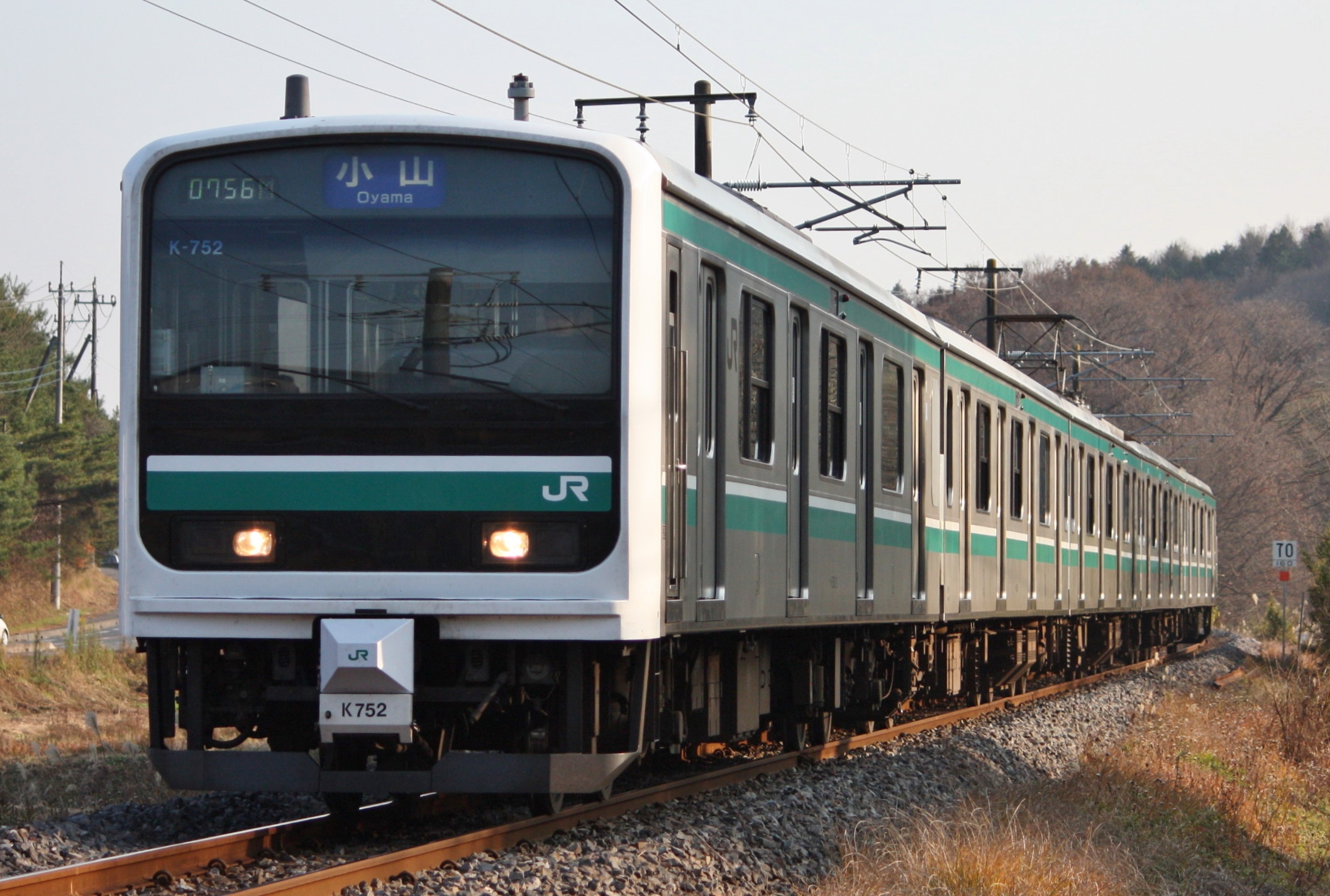
5-car set K752 in December 2008

=== Transfer to JR Kyushu ===
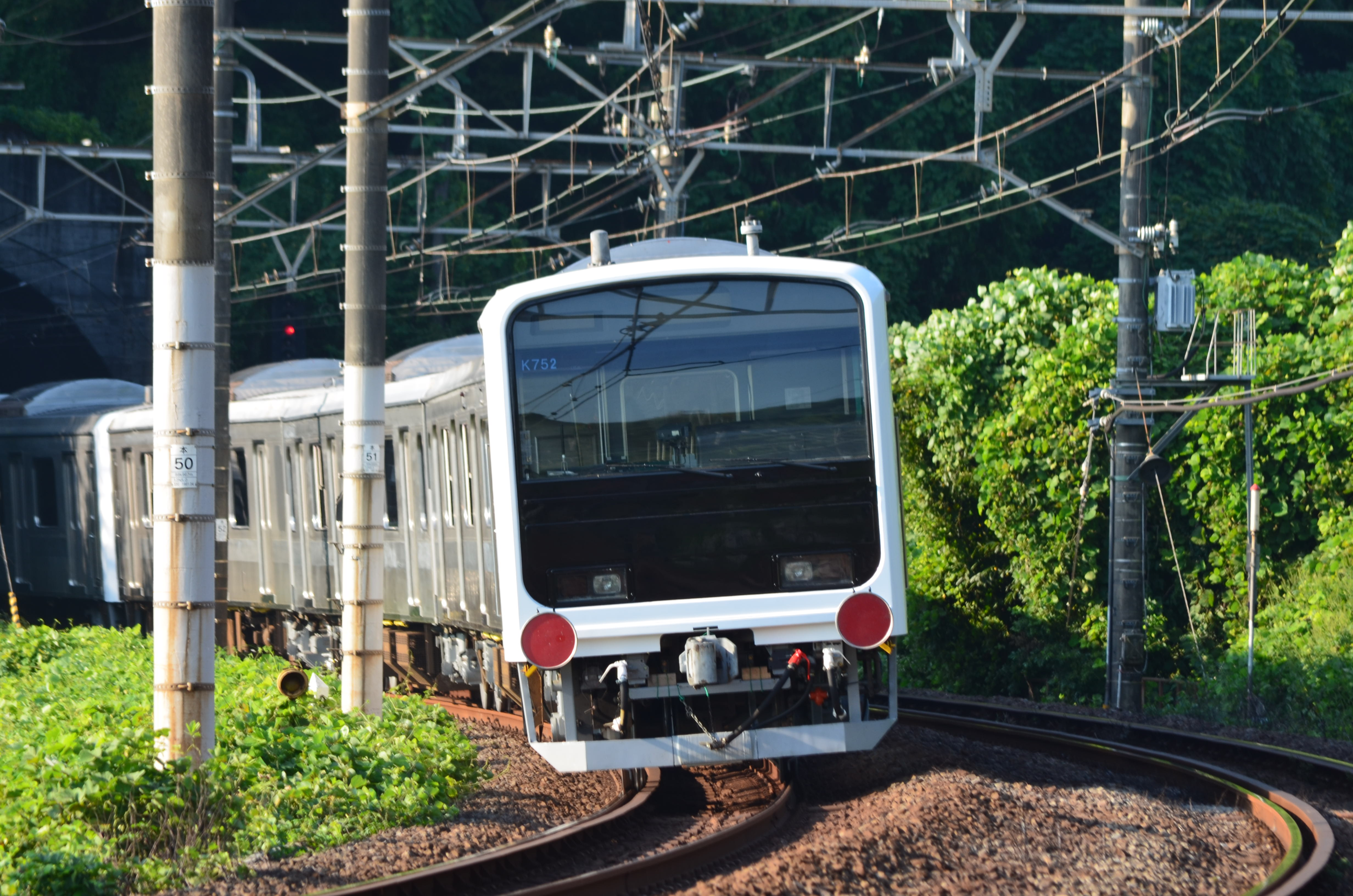
E501 series sets being delivered to JR Kyushu

In September 2025, four cars each from sets K752 and K753 were transferred to Kyushu Railway Company (JR Kyushu). JR Kyushu stated that the transferred sets would replace life-expired 415-1500 series sets on services running through the Kanmon Railway Tunnel, albeit on a provisional basis. JR Kyushu formally announced in June 2026 that the sets, reclassified as 501 series (501系), would enter revenue service in 2028.

== Build details ==
The build details for the fleet are as shown below.

Set No.	Manufacturer	Delivered	Toilet added	Refurbished	Pantograph changed to single-arm	Remarks
K701	Kawasaki Heavy Industries	23 May 1995	21 February 2007	20 January 2012	27 November 2015	
K702	Kawasaki Heavy Industries	20 February 1997	26 October 2006	5 November 2012	29 October 2015	
K703	Kawasaki Heavy Industries	6 March 1997	20 November 2006	27 March 2012	24 December 2015	
K704	Tokyu Car	18 March 1997	3 October 2006	26 January 2011	13 February 2015	
K751	Tokyu Car	28 March 1995	31 January 2007	21 August 2011	25 December 2014	Scrapped in August 2024
K752	Kawasaki Heavy Industries	21 February 1997	9 November 2006	21 May 2011	27 December 2014	Transferred to JR Kyushu in September 2025
K753	Kawasaki Heavy Industries	7 March 1997	6 December 2006	25 April 2011	5 December 2014	Transferred to JR Kyushu in September 2025
K754	Tokyu Car	19 March 1997	22 January 2007	1 September 2011	24 December 2014	Converted to E501 SAKIGAKE train in October 2023

== E501 SAKIGAKE ==
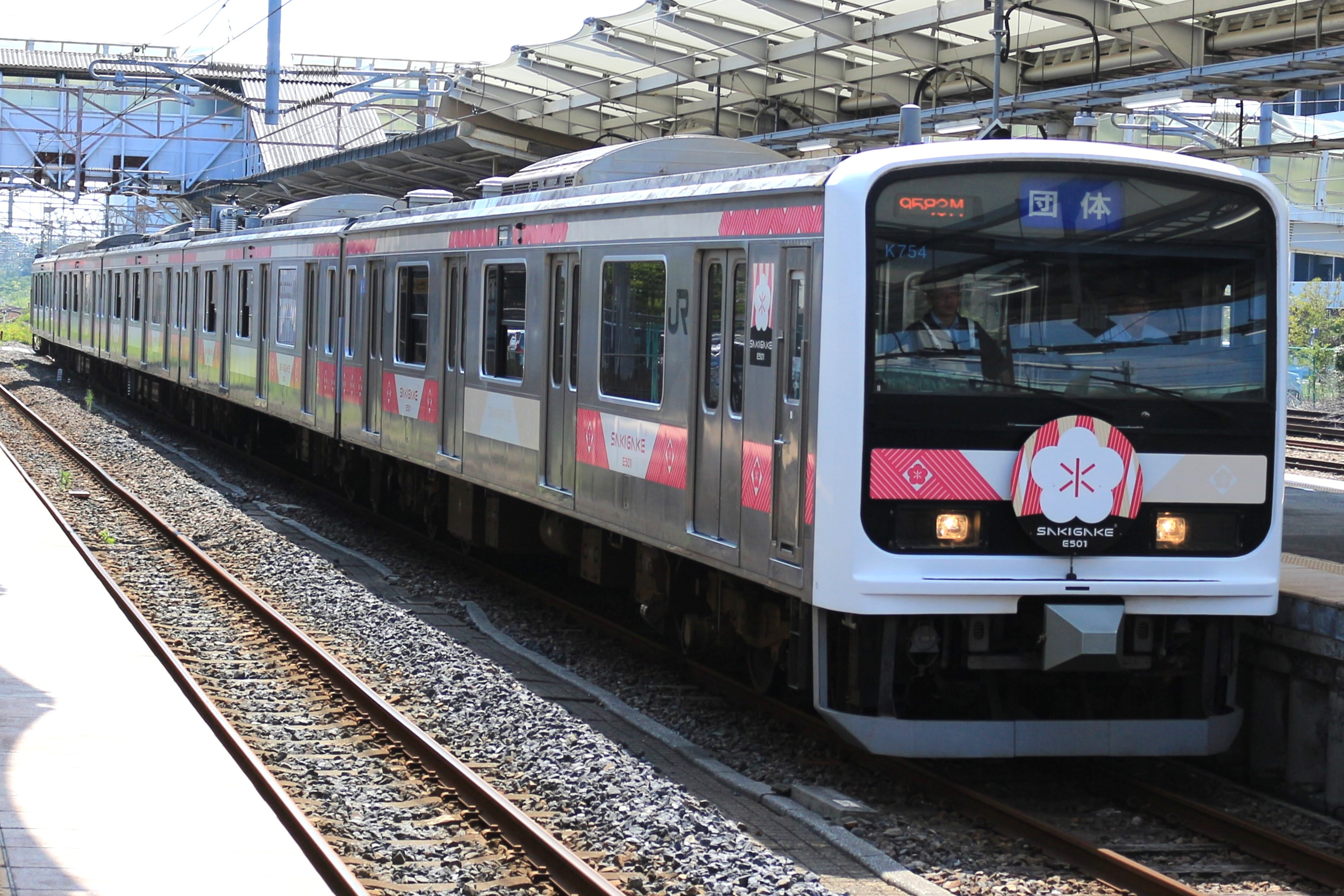
The E501 SAKIGAKE set in August 2025

On 25 October 2023, JR East announced that a 5-car E501 series train has been modified to become the E501 SAKIGAKE train. This particular set received a new livery that inspires the image of red and white plum blossoms. The interior features tables for customers to eat and have drinks while onboard the train as well as a refrigerator that stores the cold drinks. The set that underwent the conversion is K754 and it entered service from 23 November 2023 on a special trip on the Jōban and Mito lines between Mito and Yūki stations.
