= Niihari temple ruins =

Archaeological site in Ibaraki, Japan

- 結城廃寺跡
- Location within Ibaraki Prefecture Location within Japan

Religion
- Affiliation: Buddhist
- Deity: unknown
- Rite: unknown
- Status: ruins (no public facilities)

Location
- Location: Chikusei, Sakuragawa, Ibaraki
- Country: Japan
- Interactive map of Niihari temple ruins
- Coordinates: 36°20′43″N 140°02′31″E

Architecture
- Completed: early Nara period

The Niihari temple ruins (新治廃寺跡, Niihari Haiji ato) is an archaeological site with the ruins of a Buddhist temple located in the Kujira neighborhood of the city of Chikusei, Ibaraki, Japan. The temple no longer exists, but the temple grounds were designated a National Historic Site in 1942.

== Overview ==
The Niihari temple site is located approximately 200 to 300 meters north of the Niihari Gunga ruins, and therefore is most likely the official temple associated with that Nara period country-level government administration complex. It is located on a river terrace on the bank of the Kokai River and Japan National Route 50 cuts through the southern end of the ruins. The site has been known since ancient times, and fragments of roof tiles and earthenware have been found in the locale. Three archaeological excavations from 1939 have found the foundations of the Kondō, east and west Pagodas, and Lecture Hall. A corridor from the Middle Gate surrounds the main hall and town pagodas, and connects with the lecture hall. The arrangement of structures was the same as the famed Yakushi-ji in Nara. From the numerous roof tiles uncovered, the temple also had a strong connection to the Shimotsuke Yakushi-ji which also dates from the same period, and also with the Yūki temple ruins. From the layout and artifacts, this temple ruin indicates the spread of Buddhism into the northern Kantō region from an early date, with strong Kansai influences.

The site was backfilled after excavation and is now an empty field with stone markers indicating they locations of the various building foundations. The site is located about 30 minutes on foot from Niihari Station on the JR East Mito Line.

=== Uenohara Tile Kiln Site ===
The Uenohara Tile Kiln Site (上野原瓦窯跡) is an archaeological site with the ruins of the kiln that was used to make the roof tiles found at the Niihari temple ruins. The kiln ruin is located in the neighboring city of Sakuragawa. The large, flat-style kiln had a length of 13.8 meters and width of 3.64 meters, of which only the bottom portion has survived. The kiln ruins are part of the National Historic Site designation.

== See also ==
- List of Historic Sites of Japan (Ibaraki)
