= Yūki temple ruins =

- 結城廃寺跡
- Location within Ibaraki Prefecture Location within Japan

Religion
- Affiliation: Buddhist
- Deity: unknown
- Rite: unknown
- Status: ruins (no public facilities)

Location
- Location: Yūki, Ibaraki
- Country: Japan
- Interactive map of Yūki temple ruins
- Coordinates: 36°15′26″N 139°52′42″E

Architecture
- Completed: early Nara period

The Yūki temple ruins (結城廃寺跡, Yūki Haiji ato) is an archaeological site with the ruins of a large Buddhist temple located in the Yabata-Kamiyamakawa neighborhood of the city of Yūki, Ibaraki, in the northern Kantō region of Japan. The temple no longer exists, but the temple grounds were designated as a National Historic Site in 2002.

== Overview ==
The Yūki temple ruins site is located approximately 4.5 kilometers south of Yūki Station, to the east of the modern center of Yūki city. It is located on a river terrace on the west bank of the Kinugawa River, which is the northernmost tip of ancient Shimotsuke Province. The temple was erected in the early 700's in the early Nara period and was destroyed by fire in the 900's in the Heian period. It was rebuilt in the Kamakura period and survived until the middle of the Muromachi period.

Archaeological excavations were conducted eight times from 1988 to 1995. The ruins of the central temple area contained the foundations of the Kondō, the Pagoda, Middle Gate Lecture Hall, Cloisters, and monks dormitory. The foundations of a South Gate have not been discovered. Traces of a moat were also found, indicating that the temple compound measured 180 meters from east-to-west and 250 meters from north-to-south. The layout of the structures was identical to that of Asuka period Hokki-ji in Nara Prefecture with the Kondō in the west and Pagoda in the east. Various artifacts excavated included "Renbutsu" Buddhist votive statues in clay, roof tiles (including end tiles with a lotus motif) and titles giving the name of the temple as "Hōjō-ji". This corresponds to the name of a temple in the Shōmonki, a medieval chronicle of the life of Taira no Masakado. From the layout and artifacts, this temple ruin indicates the spread of Buddhism into the northern Kantō region from an early date, with strong Kansai influences.

The post-Heian period temple area surrounded by an irregular quadrilateral moat, measuring 266 meters on the east, 250 meters on the west, 111 meters on the south, and 132 meters on the north The east-west width is therefore narrower than in the Nara period. However, no remains of the post-Heian period buildings have been confirmed, and no medieval roof tiles have been excavated. It is believed that this is because the later buildings had foundation stones placed directly on the surface of the earth without digging, and the roofs were made of cypress bark instead of clay tiles.

The site was backfilled after excavation and is now an empty field. It is located about 16 minutes by car from Yūki Station on the JR East Mito Line.

=== Yūki Hachiman Tile Kiln Site ===
The Yūki Hachiman Tile Kiln Site (結城八幡瓦窯跡, Yūki Hachiman Gayōseki ato) is an archaeological site with the ruins of the kilns used to make the roof tiles used for the temple found at the Yūki temple ruins. It is located approximately 500 meters to the northeast of the temple ruins. The site was first investigated in 1953, and the ruins of four noborigama-style kilns were confirmed in 2000 and 2001 excavations. Two of the four kilns are over five meters long, and the other two are of unknown overall size. In addition, one earthen basin was detected on the eastern slope and one on the northern slope, and one pit dwelling site was detected on the flat surface of the plateau. The earthen basins are believed to be storage places for clay, and the site of the pit dwelling to be a workshop.

The roof tiles for the Shimotsuke Yakushi-ji temple, also constructed in the Nara period, came from the kilns at this site. The kiln ruins are part of the National Historic Site designation.

== See also ==
- List of Historic Sites of Japan (Ibaraki)
