= Otabayashi Station =

Railway station in Yūki, Ibaraki Prefecture, Japan

Otabayashi Station 小田林駅
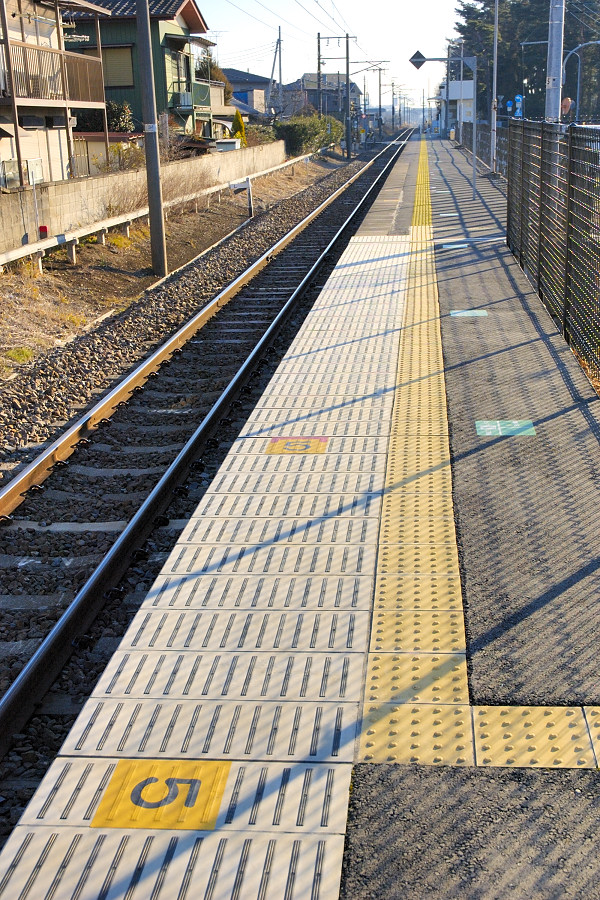
- * View toward Yuki Station from the platform of Otabayashi Station (JR East / Mito Line)

General information
- Location: Otabayashi 2546, Yūki-shi, Ibaraki-ken 307-0007; Japan
- Coordinates: 36.3009°N 139.8535°E
- Operator: JR East
- Line: ■ Mito Line
- Distance: 4.9 km from Oyama
- Platforms: 1 side platform

Other information
- Status: Unstaffed
- Website: Official website

History
- Opened: 1 April 1955

Services
Preceding station	JR East	Following station
Oyama Terminus	Mito Line	Yūki towards Mito
Location
- Location within Ibaraki Prefecture Location within Japan

Otabayashi Station (小田林駅, Otabayashi-eki) is a passenger railway station in the city of Yūki, Ibaraki Prefecture, Japan, operated by East Japan Railway Company (JR East).

== Lines ==
Otabayashi Station is served by the Mito Line, and is located 4.9 km from the official starting point of the line at Oyama Station.

== Station layout ==
The station consists of a single side platform serving traffic in both directions. There is no station building, but only a shelter on the platform. The station is unattended.

== History ==
Otabayashi Station was opened on 1 April 1955. The station was absorbed into the JR East network upon the privatization of the Japanese National Railways (JNR) on 1 April 1987.

== Surrounding area ==
- Yūki Police Station
- National Route 50

== See also ==
- List of railway stations in Japan
