= Higashi-Yūki Station =

Railway station in Yūki, Ibaraki Prefecture, Japan

Higashi-Yūki Station 東結城駅
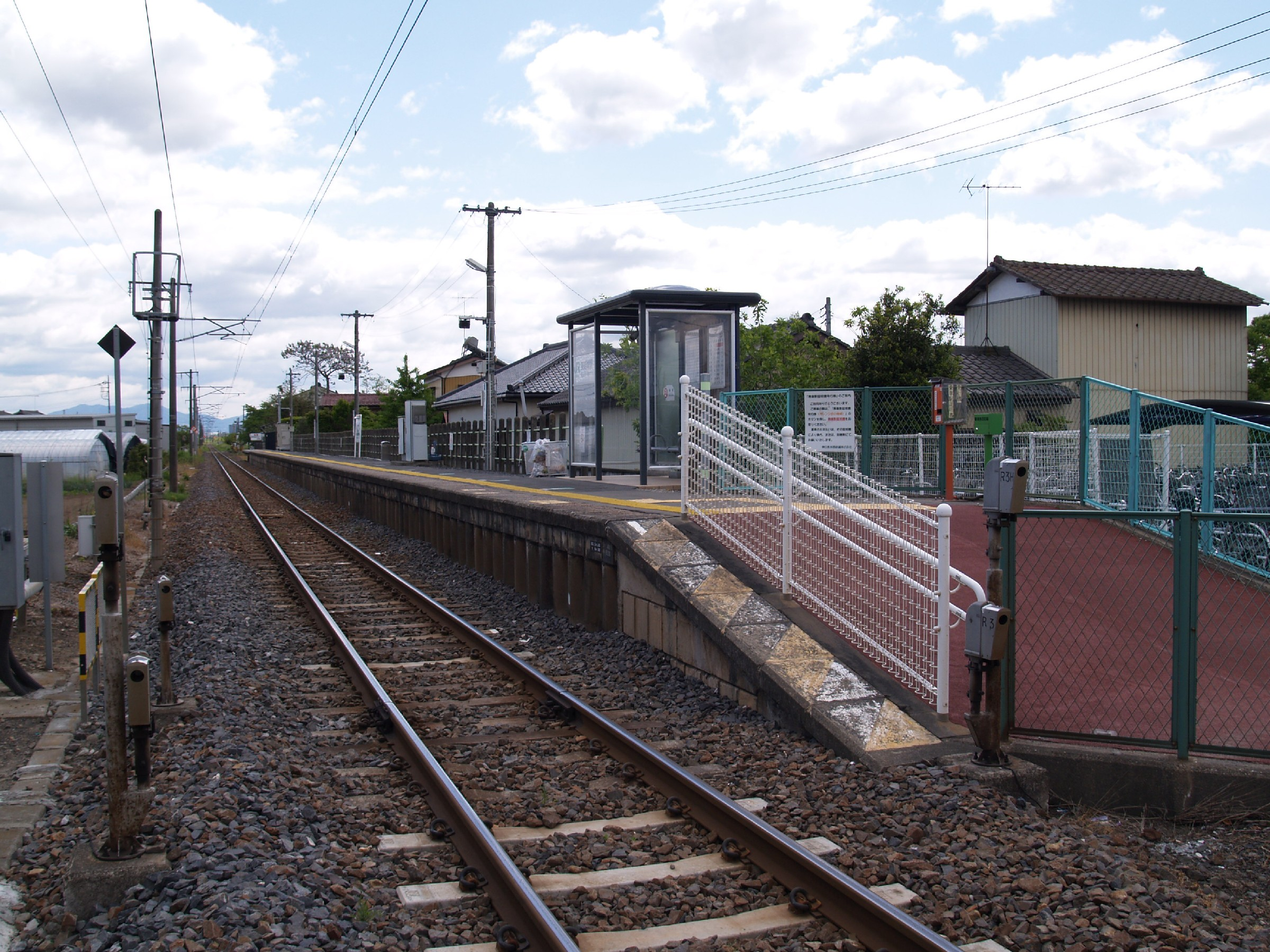
- Higashi-Yūki Station, May 2010

General information
- Location: Yūki 3320, Yūki-shi, Ibaraki-ken 307-0001; Japan
- Coordinates: 36.2963°N 139.8914°E
- Operator: JR East
- Line: ■ Mito Line
- Distance: 8.3 km from Oyama
- Platforms: 1 side platform

Other information
- Status: Unstaffed
- Website: Official website

History
- Opened: 1 December 1937.

Services
Preceding station	JR East	Following station
Yūki towards Oyama	Mito Line	Kawashima towards Mito
Location
- Location within Ibaraki Prefecture Location within Japan

Higashi-Yūki Station (東結城駅, Higashi-Yūki-eki) is a passenger railway station in the city of Yūki, Ibaraki Prefecture, Japan, operated by East Japan Railway Company (JR East).

== Lines ==
Higashi-Yūki Station is served by the Mito Line, and is located 8.3 km from the official starting point of the line at Oyama Station.

== Station layout ==
Higashi-Yūki Station consists of a single side platform serving traffic in both directions. There is no station building, and the station is unattended.

== History ==
Higashi-Yūki Station was opened on 1 December 1937. The station was absorbed into the JR East network upon the privatization of the Japanese National Railways (JNR) on 1 April 1987.

== Surrounding area ==
- National Route 50

== See also ==
- List of railway stations in Japan
