= Kawashima Station =

Railway station in Chikusei, Ibaraki Prefecture, Japan

Kawashima Station 川島駅
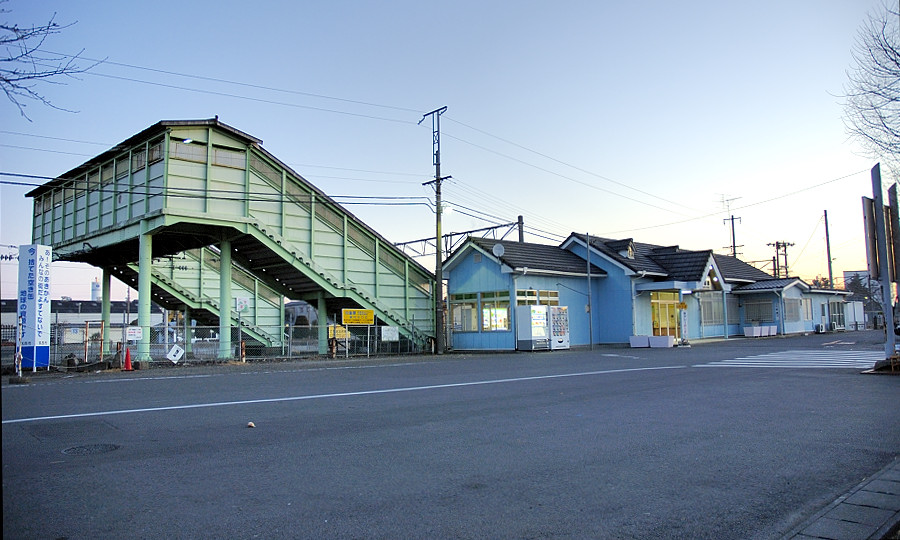
- Kawashima Station, January 2007

General information
- Location: 168-1, Isayama, Chikusei-shi, Ibaraki-ken 308-0857; Japan
- Coordinates: 36.2961°N 139.9164°E
- Operator: JR East
- Line: ■ Mito Line
- Distance: 10.4 km from Oyama
- Platforms: 2 side platforms

Other information
- Status: Staffed
- Website: Official website

History
- Opened: 16 April 1889
- Former names: Isayama (until 1889)

Passengers
- FY2019: 776 daily

Services
Preceding station	JR East	Following station
Higashi-Yūki towards Oyama	Mito Line	Tamado towards Mito
Location
- Location within Ibaraki Prefecture Location within Japan

Kawashima Station (川島駅, Kawashima-eki) is a passenger railway station in the city of Chikusei, Ibaraki, Japan, operated by East Japan Railway Company (JR East).

== Lines ==
Kawashima Station is served by the Mito Line, and is located 10.4 km from the official starting point of the line at Oyama Station.

== Station layout ==
The station consists of two opposed side platforms connected to the station building by a footbridge. The station is staffed.

=== Platforms ===
1	■ Mito Line	for Oyama
2	■ Mito Line	for Shimodate and Tomobe and Mito

== History ==
Kawashima Station was opened on 16 April 1889 as Isayama Station (伊佐山駅). It was renamed to its present name 25 May 1889. A new station building was completed in January 2015.

== Passenger statistics ==
In fiscal 2019, the station was used by an average of 776 passengers daily (boarding passengers only).

== Surrounding area ==
- National Route 50
- Kinugawa River

== See also ==
- List of railway stations in Japan
