= Shōfuku-ji =

Shōfuku-ji is the name of more than one Buddhist temple in Japan.

- Shōfuku-ji (聖福寺). A Rinzai temple in Fukuoka.
- Shōfuku-ji (正福寺). A Rinzai temple in Tokyo.
- Shōfuku-ji (聖福寺). An Ōbaku temple in Nagasaki.
- Shōfuku-ji (勝福寺). A Shingon temple in Odawara.

Other Japanese temples named "Shōfuku-ji" include:

- Shōfuku-ji (勝福寺). A Rinzai temple in Fukuoka.
- Shōfuku-ji (勝福寺). A Shingon temple in Kobe.
- Shōfuku-ji (正福寺). A Rinzai temple in Saga.
- Shōfuku-ji (正福寺). A Tendai temple in Shin'onsen.
- Shōfuku-ji (聖福寺). A Rinzai temple in Wakayama.
