= Tamado Station =

Railway station in Chikusei, Ibaraki Prefecture, Japan

Tamado Station 玉戸駅
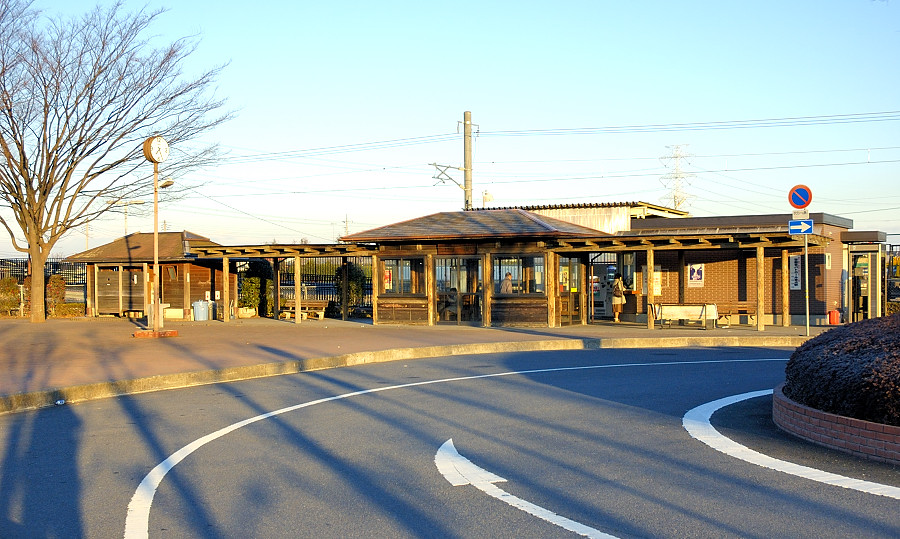
- Tamado Station, January 2007

General information
- Location: Tamado 1675-1, Chikusei-shi, Ibaraki-ken 308-0847; Japan
- Coordinates: 36.2986°N 139.9385°E
- Operator: JR East
- Line: ■ Mito Line
- Distance: 12.5 km from Oyama
- Platforms: 1 side platform

Other information
- Status: Staffed
- Website: Official website

History
- Opened: 20 June 1988

Passengers
- FY2019: 662 daily

Services
Preceding station	JR East	Following station
Kawashima towards Oyama	Mito Line	Shimodate towards Mito
Location
- Location within Ibaraki Prefecture Location within Japan

Tamado Station (玉戸駅, Tamado-eki) is a passenger railway station in the city of Chikusei, Ibaraki, Japan, operated by East Japan Railway Company (JR East).

== Lines ==
Tamado Station is served by the Mito Line, and is located 12.5 km from the official starting point of the line at Oyama Station.

== Station layout ==
The station consists of one side platform serving traffic in both directions. The station is staffed.

== History ==
Tamado Station was opened on 20 June 1988.

== Passenger statistics ==
In fiscal 2019, the station was used by an average of 662 passengers daily (boarding passengers only).

== Surrounding area ==
- National Route 50
- Chikusei-Tamado Post Office
- Tamado Industrial Estate

== See also ==
- List of railway stations in Japan
