= Wake no Kiyomaro =

Japanese official during Nara period

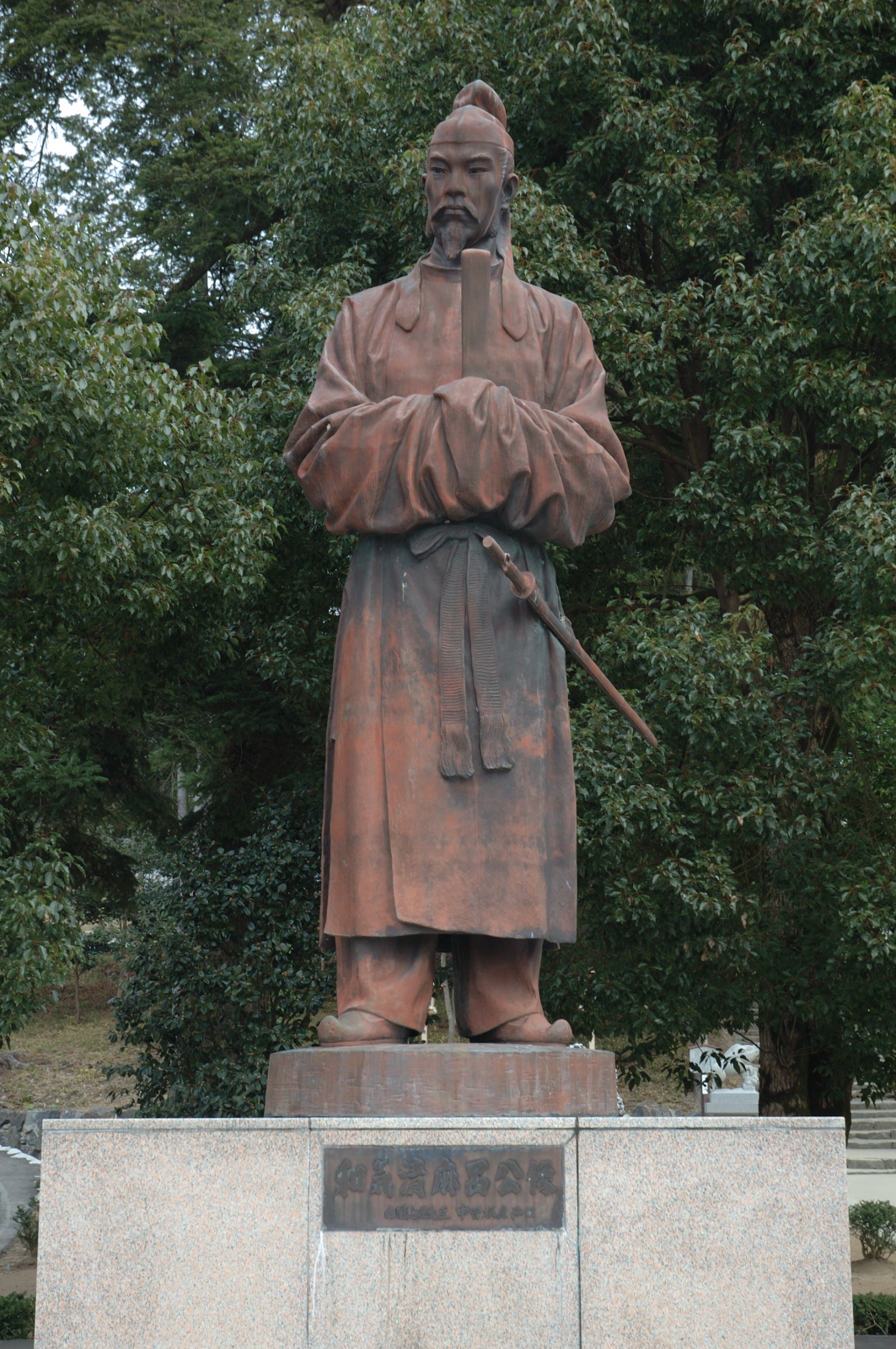
A statue of Wake no Kiyomaro in Wake shrine

Wake no Kiyomaro (和気 清麻呂; 733–799) was a high-ranking Japanese official during the Nara period. He was born in Bizen Province (now Wake, Okayama) to a family of politically important, devoted Buddhists who hoped to keep Buddhism and politics separate through religious reform. He became a trusted advisor to Emperor Kanmu, a position which he used to encourage the development of Buddhism in a direction which would prevent it from posing a threat to the government. According to the Shoku Nihongi, he was sent to the Usa Shrine to receive a divine message; stating that only those of descent from Amaterasu could become emperor, it refuted the previous divine message claiming Dōkyō was to be the next emperor after Empress Kōken (later Empress Shōtoku). This report angered Dōkyō, who used his influence with the Empress to have an edict issued sending Kiyomaro into exile; he also had the sinews of Kiyomaro's legs cut, and only the protection of the Fujiwara clan saved him from being killed outright.

The following year, however, Empress Shōtoku died. She was succeeded by Emperor Kōnin, who in turn exiled Dōkyō to Shimotsuke Province and not only recalled Wake no Kiyomaro from exile, but also appointed him as both kami (governor) of Bizen Province and Udaijin (junior minister of state). The following year, he petitioned the governor of Dazaifu to send officials to Usa to investigate allegations of "fraudulent oracles"; in his later report, Wake no Kiyomaro stated that out of five oracles checked, two were found to be fabricated. This resulted in the government relieving Usa no Ikemori of his position as head priest and replacing him with the previously-disgraced Ōga no Tamaro. Following this, Wake no Kiyomaro returned to Yamato. He remained a trusted advisor to Emperor Kammu; in the spring of 793, he convinced the emperor to abandon the delay-plagued construction of a capital at Nagaoka and instead seek another location to the northeast, at Heian-kyō (modern-day Kyōto.

His face appeared on 10-yen notes issued from 1888.
