= Mechelen =

City in Antwerp Province, Belgium

Mechelen: Malines (French)
- Municipality
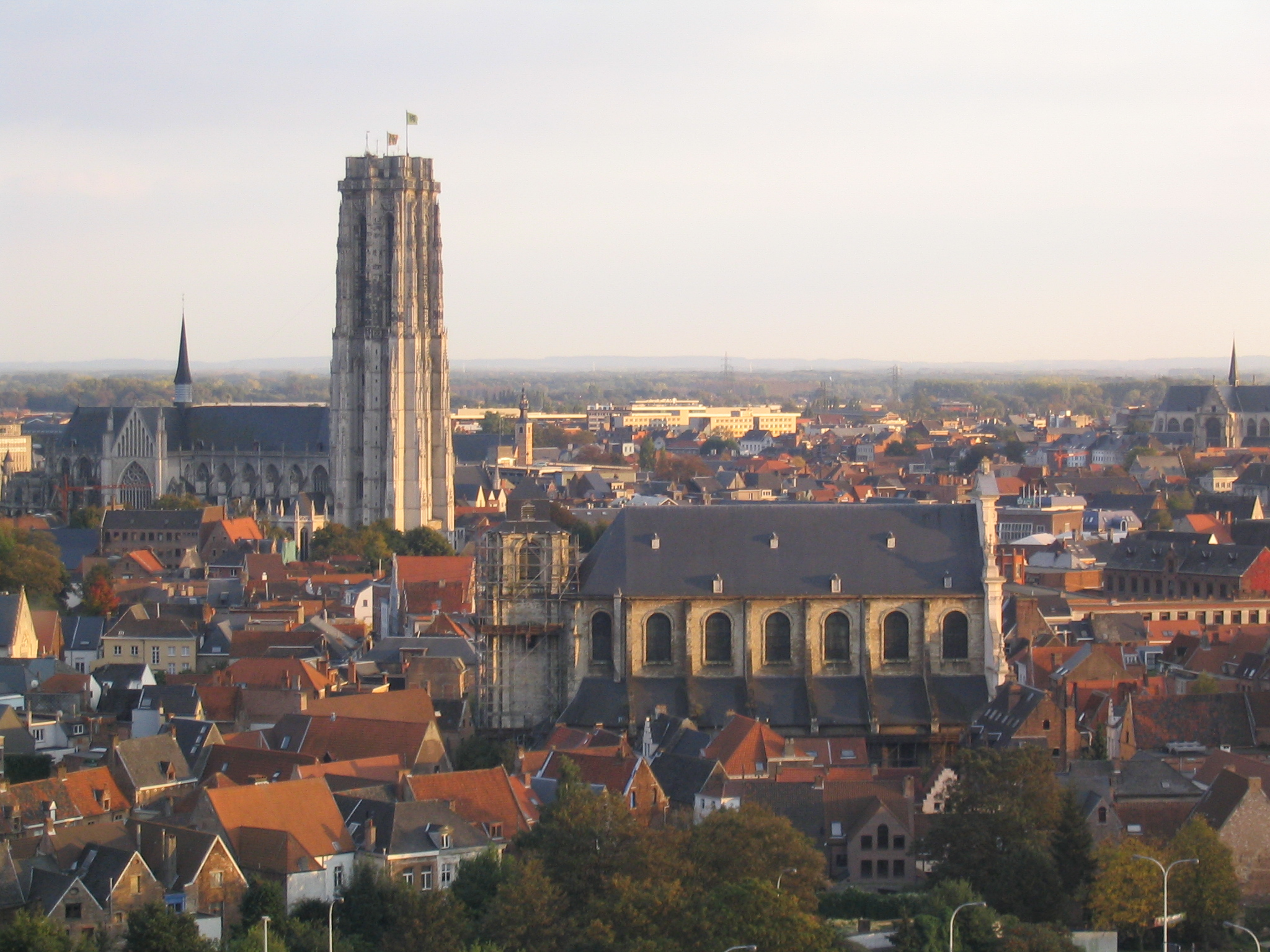
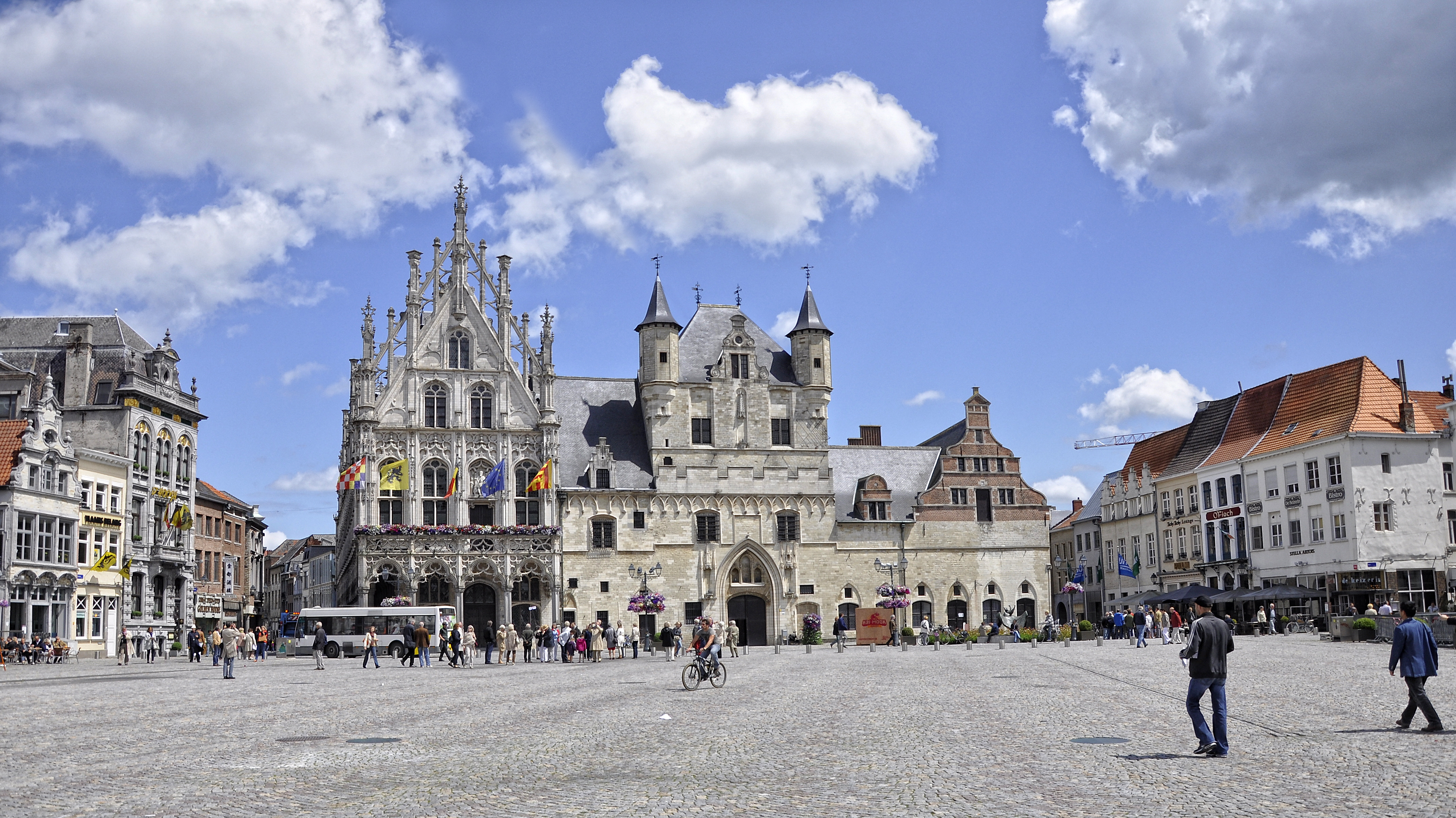
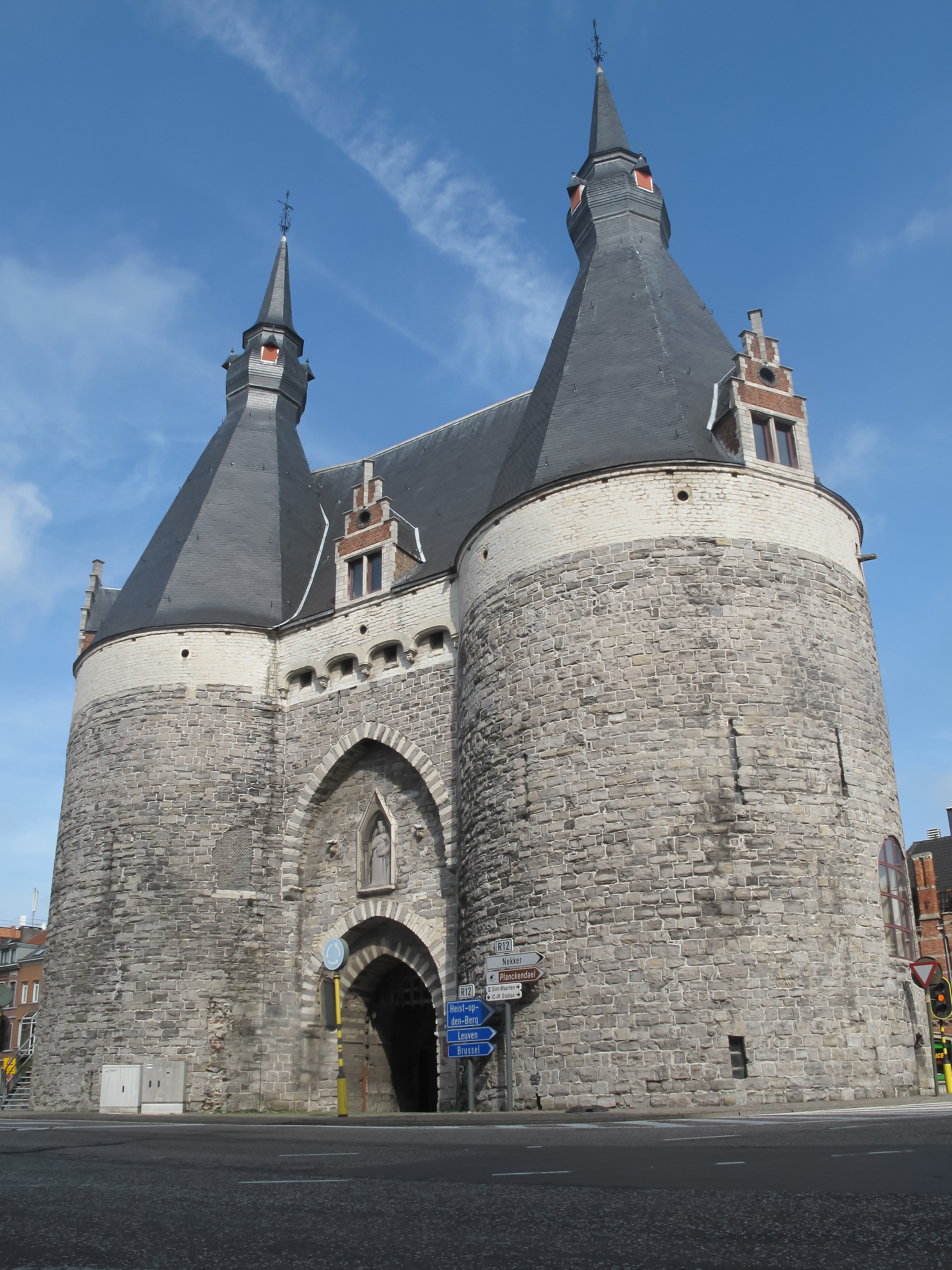
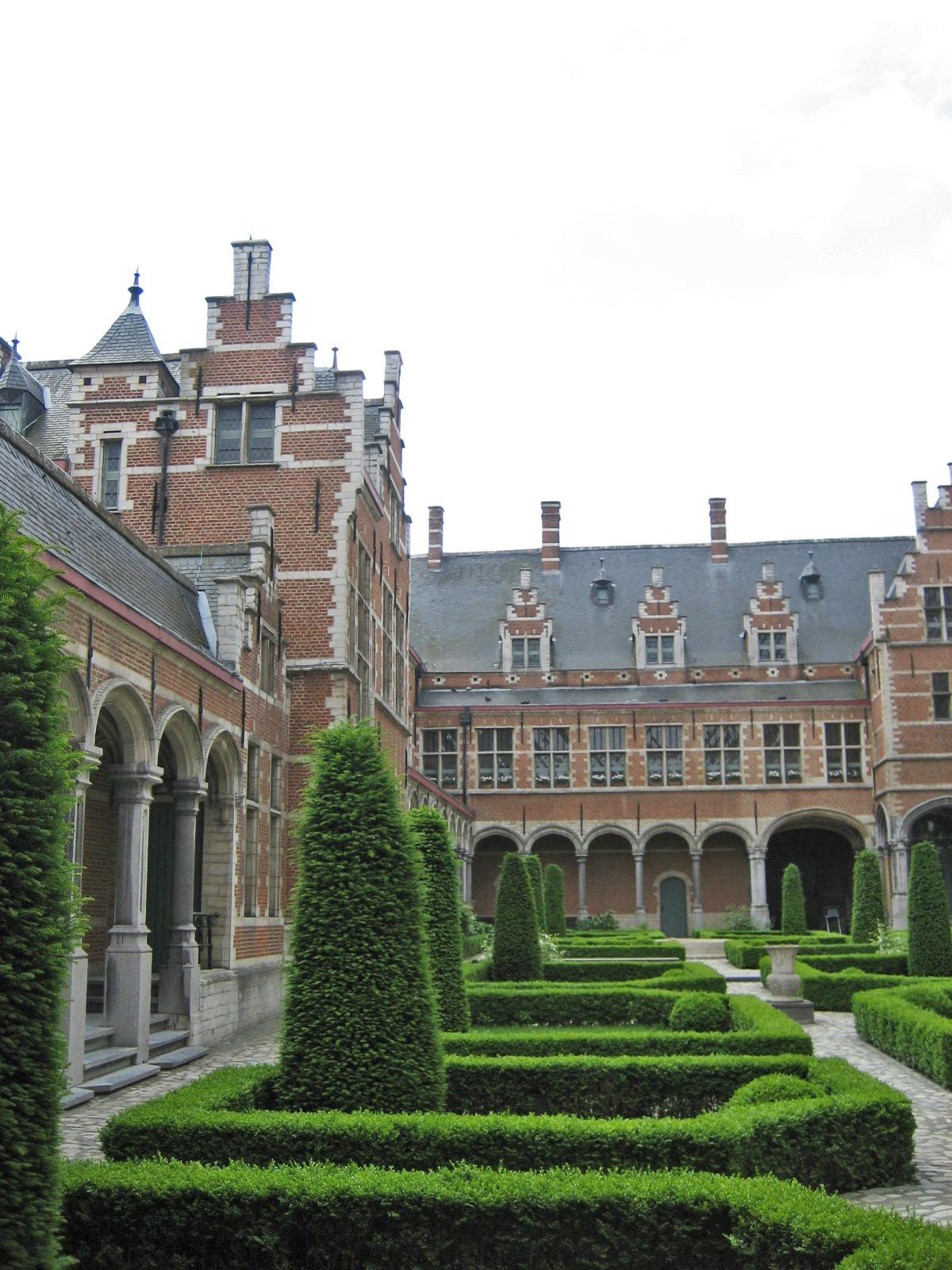
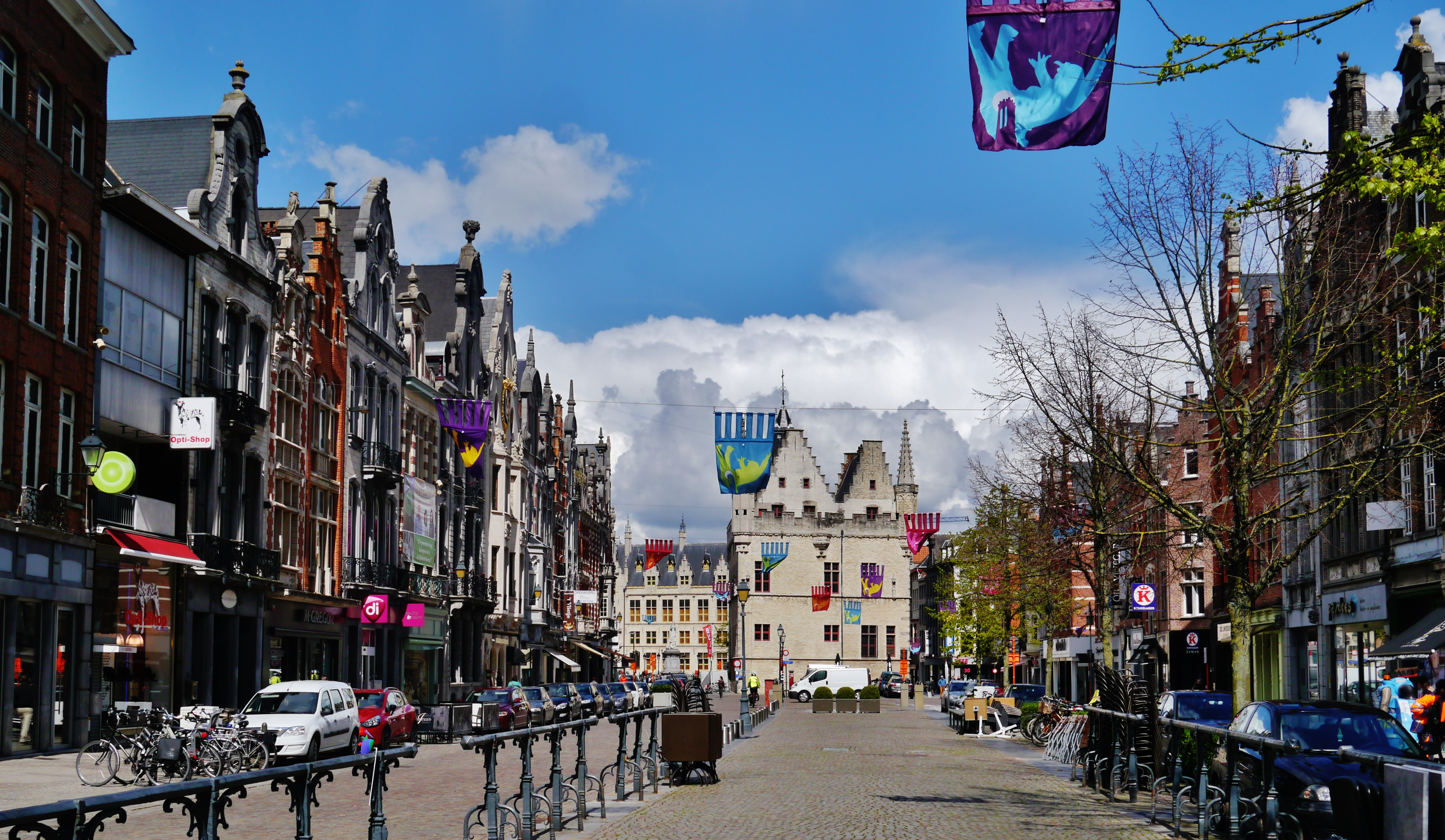
- Left to right, top to bottom: View of the city with St. Rumbold's Cathedral on the far left, Grote Markt with Mechelen City Hall, Brusselpoort, Hof van Savoye, IJzerenleen in the city center with the Schepenhuis

- Flag Coat of arms

- Mechelen municipality and arrondissement in the Flemish province of Antwerp
- Interactive map of Mechelen
- Location in Belgium
- Coordinates: 51°01′40″N 4°28′50″E
- Country: Belgium
- Community: Flemish Community
- Region: Flemish Region
- Province: Antwerp
- Arrondissement: Mechelen

Government
  - Mayor: Bart Somers (Open Vld)
  - Governing party: Open Vld-Groen-M+

Area
  - Total: 65.79 km^{2} (25.40 sq mi)

Population (2020-01-01)
  - Total: 86,921
  - Density: 1,321/km^{2} (3,422/sq mi)
- Postal codes: 2800, 2801, 2811, 2812
- NIS code: 12025
- Area codes: 015–03
- Website: www.mechelen.be

Mechelen (Dutch pronunciation: [ˈmɛxələ(n)]; French: Malines [malin]; historically known as Mechlin in English (Note: Mechelen has been known in English as Mechlin, from where the adjective Mechlinian is derived. This name may still be used, especially in a traditional or historical context. The city's French name, Malines, had also been used in English in the past (in the 19th and 20th centuries); however, this has largely been abandoned. Meanwhile, the Dutch-derived Mechelen began to be used in English increasingly from the late 20th century onwards, even while Mechlin remained still in use (for example, a Mechlinian is an inhabitant of this city or someone seen as born-and-raised there; the term is also the name of the city dialect; as an adjective Mechlinian may refer to the city or to its dialect.)) is a city and municipality in the province of Antwerp in the Flemish Region of Belgium. The municipality comprises the city of Mechelen proper, some quarters at its outskirts, the hamlets of Nekkerspoel (adjacent) and Battel (a few kilometers away), as well as the villages of Walem, Heffen, Leest, Hombeek, and Muizen. The city is often referred to as the Dijlestad ("City on the Dyle") as the river Dyle (Dijle) flows through it.

Mechelen lies on the major urban and industrial axis Brussels–Antwerp, about 25 km (16 mi) from each city. Inhabitants find employment at Mechelen's southern industrial and northern office estates, as well as at offices or industry near the capital and Brussels Airport, or at industrial plants near Antwerp's seaport.

Mechelen is one of Flanders' prominent cities of historical art, with Antwerp, Bruges, Brussels, Ghent, and Leuven. It was notably a centre for artistic production during the Northern Renaissance, when painters, printmakers, illuminators and composers of polyphony were attracted by patrons such as Margaret of York, Margaret of Austria and Hieronymus van Busleyden.

== History ==
=== Origins ===
Archaeological proof of habitation during the La Tène era in the triangle Brussels–Leuven–Antwerp, mainly concentrated around Mechelen, which originated in wetlands, includes an 8.4-metre-long (28 ft) canoe cut from an oak tree trunk and a settlement of about five wooden houses, at Nekkerspoel.

The area of Mechelen was settled on the banks of the river during the Gallo-Roman period as evidenced by several Roman ruins and roads. Upon Rome's declining influence during 3rd–4th centuries, the area became inhabited by Germanic tribes. Its Christianization in the 7th or 8th century has traditionally been ascribed to the Irish or Scottish missionary St Rumbold (Dutch: Rombout), who was also said to have built a monastery. Work on the church dedicated to the saint (now a cathedral) started around 1200.

Antwerp lost profitable stapelrechten (rights as first seller) for wool, oats and salt to Mechelen in 1303 when John II, Duke of Brabant, granted city rights to the town. This started a rivalry between these cities that would last well into the 20th century.

=== 15th–18th centuries ===
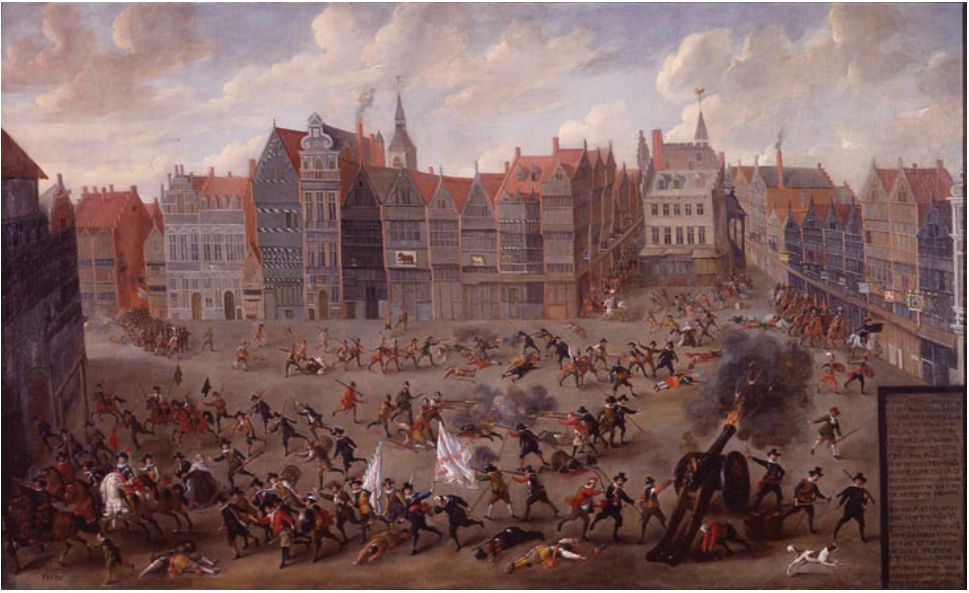
Taking of Mechelen by the Geuzen under the command of Olivier van Tympele and John Norreys on 9 April 1580 by Nicolaas van Eyck

In the 15th century, the city came under the rule of the Dukes of Burgundy, marking the beginning of a prosperous period. In 1473, Charles the Bold moved several political bodies to the city, and Mechelen served as the seat of the Superior Court until the French Revolution. In 1490, a regular postal service between Mechelen and Innsbruck was established.

The highly lucrative cloth trade gained Mechelen wealth and power during the Late Middle Ages and it even became the capital of the Low Countries (very roughly the Netherlands, Belgium and Luxembourg) in the first half of the 16th century under Archduchess Margaret of Austria.

During the 16th century, the city's political influence decreased dramatically, due to many governmental institutions being moved to Brussels in 1530 and after the gunpowder magazine explosion of 1546. Mechelen compensated for this by increasing prominence in the religious arena: in 1559 it was proclaimed the Archdiocese of Mechelen, seat of religious authority over the territory that would eventually become Belgium. In 1961, "Brussels" was added to the title, resulting in the current Archdiocese of Mechelen–Brussels.

Mechelen also retained further relevance as the Great Council of Mechelen remained the supreme court of the territory until the French Revolutionary Wars. In 1572, during the Eighty Years' War, the city was burned and sacked by the Spanish during the Spanish Fury at Mechelen. After this pillaging, the city was rebuilt. It was sacked again in 1580 during the English Fury at Mechelen. It was during this time that the tradition of furniture making, still seen today, began.

In 1718, a major rebellion took place in the city, angry mobs entered the Town Hall. During this time Lord Pierre de Romrée was mayor of Mechelen. The chaos ended when the Emperor formally requested the President of the Great Council to restore peace. On 18 June, Christophe-Ernest de Baillet received a full list of the people who led the troubles. The President received the support of multiple regiments that had been sent by imperial command. After negotiations de Baillet restored peace and order in the city.

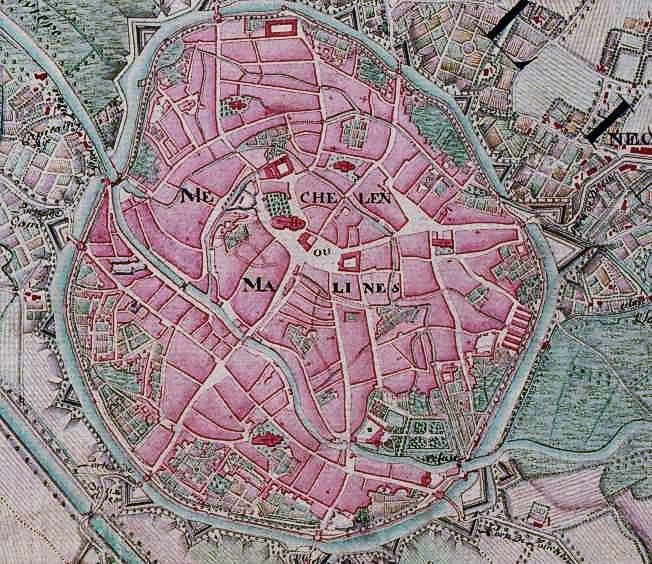
Mechelen on the Ferraris map (around 1775)

In 1781, Joseph II, Holy Roman Emperor, ordered the destruction of the city's fortified walls – their former location however continues to be referred to in the Latin terms intra muros (within the walls) and extra muros (outside), and meanwhile the site became that of the inner ring road.

=== 19th century and beyond ===
The city entered the industrial age in the 19th century. In 1835, one of the first railways on the European continent linked Brussels with Mechelen, which became the hub of the Belgian railway network. This led to a development of metalworking industries, among others the central railway workshops which are still located in the town today. During the Second World War, the extensive Mechlinian railway structure had caused the Nazi occupation forces to choose Mechelen for their infamous transit camp. Over 25,000 Jews and Roma were sent by rail to Auschwitz-Birkenau extermination camp from Mechelen. The site of the transit camp and a purpose-built complex across the public square, now house the Kazerne Dossin Memorial, Museum and Documentation Centre on Holocaust and Human Rights.

Several famous meetings on the Christian religion are connected to the name of the city. One in 1909 is thought to have inaugurated the Liturgical Movement. Between 1921 and 1925, a series of unofficial conferences, known as the Malines Conversations, presided over by Cardinal Mercier and attended by Anglican divines and laymen, including Lord Halifax, was the most significant of early attempts at the reconciliation between the Anglican and Roman Catholic Churches.

== Folklore ==
Most cities in Flanders have a mock name for their inhabitants. Since 1687, for their heroic attempt to fight the fire high up in the Saint-Rumbold's Tower, where the gothic windows had shown the flaring of only the moon between clouds, Mechlinians have been called Maneblussers (moon extinguishers).

Once every 25 years, a parade, the Ommegang, commemorates both the arrival of Holy Roman Emperor Maximilian I, father of Archduchess Margaret of Austria, and also other major events of the city's past. The Ommegang had an extra edition in 2000 for the 500th anniversary of the birth of Charles V. This cortege shows the city's six 15th–17th-century processional giants and other serious and humoresque puppets and carts, all typically made on a huge scale, and has been UNESCO Masterpiece of the Oral and Intangible Heritage of Humanity since 2005.

The city's 17th-century wooden mascot, which since 1775 has been called Opsinjoorke 'the doll', is pulled about on a sheet as part of the Ommegang. Nowadays, it is the replica that is so pulled around the city. A recent bronze statue depicting the Opsinjoorke stands in front of the Belfry.

The annual parade of carts decorated with flowers (comparable to that of Blankenberge for Mechlinian florists still prepare up to half of decorations), and with vegetables—all of which are local to the area—has been indefinitely canceled since the beginning of the 21st century due to lack of financing by the city.

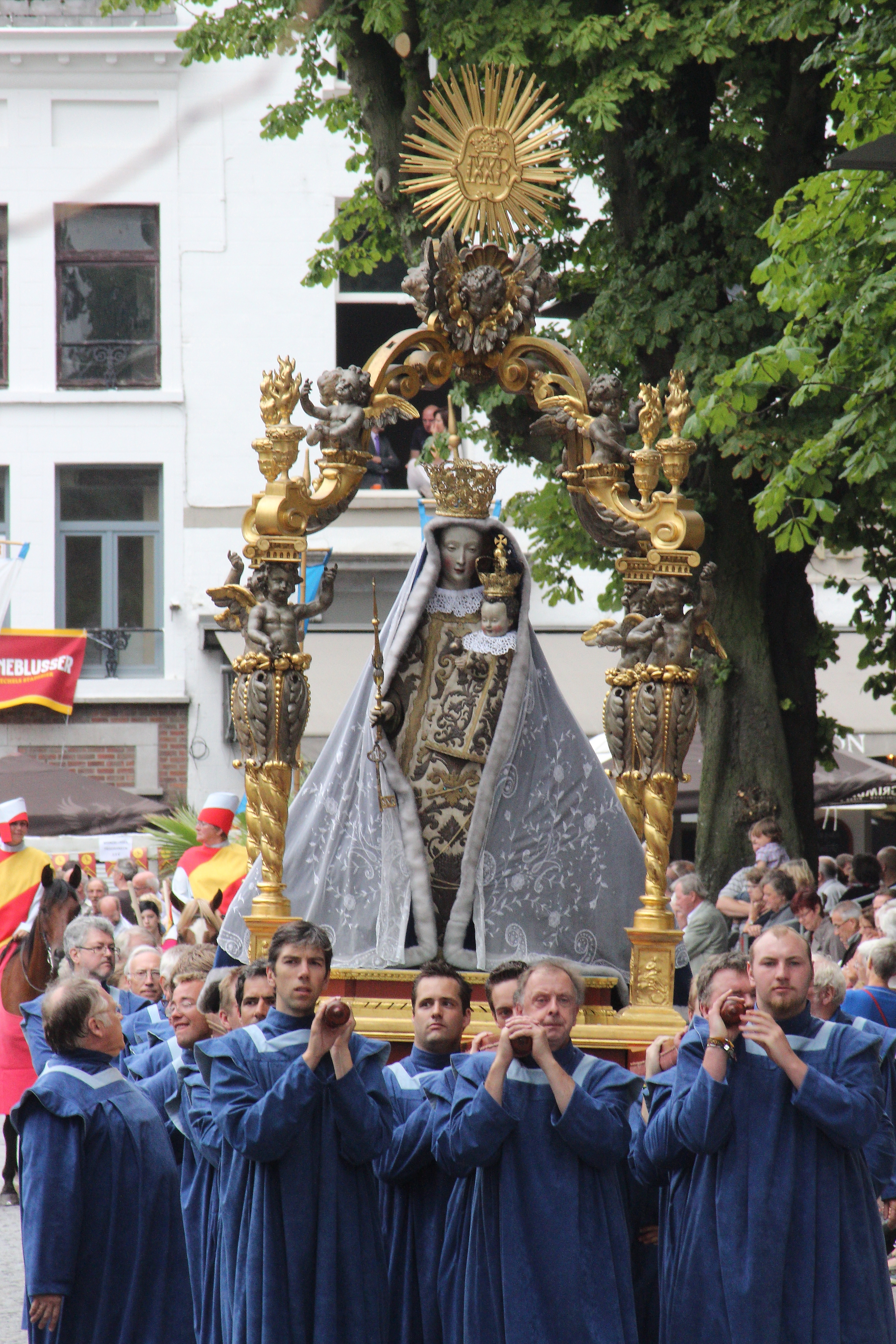
A statue of Our Lady of Hanswijk is carried through the city during the procession in 2013

In spring, a legendary holy statue of Our Lady is the main feature in the Procession of Hanswijk.

Mechelen used to have its own newspaper called de Krijgstrompet, which was the official newspaper of the army.

== Dialect ==
Informally, many Mechlinians (Dutch Mechelaars, locally pronounced Mecheleirs) speak Mechlinian (Mechels), a Dutch dialect which is distinct from other Brabantic dialects.

Since 1995, a subscribers' quarterly, De Mecheleir, shows old photographs of Mechelen and has stories on the local history, as well as a few columns written mimicking the dialect, for which there is no standard spelling.

== Specialties ==
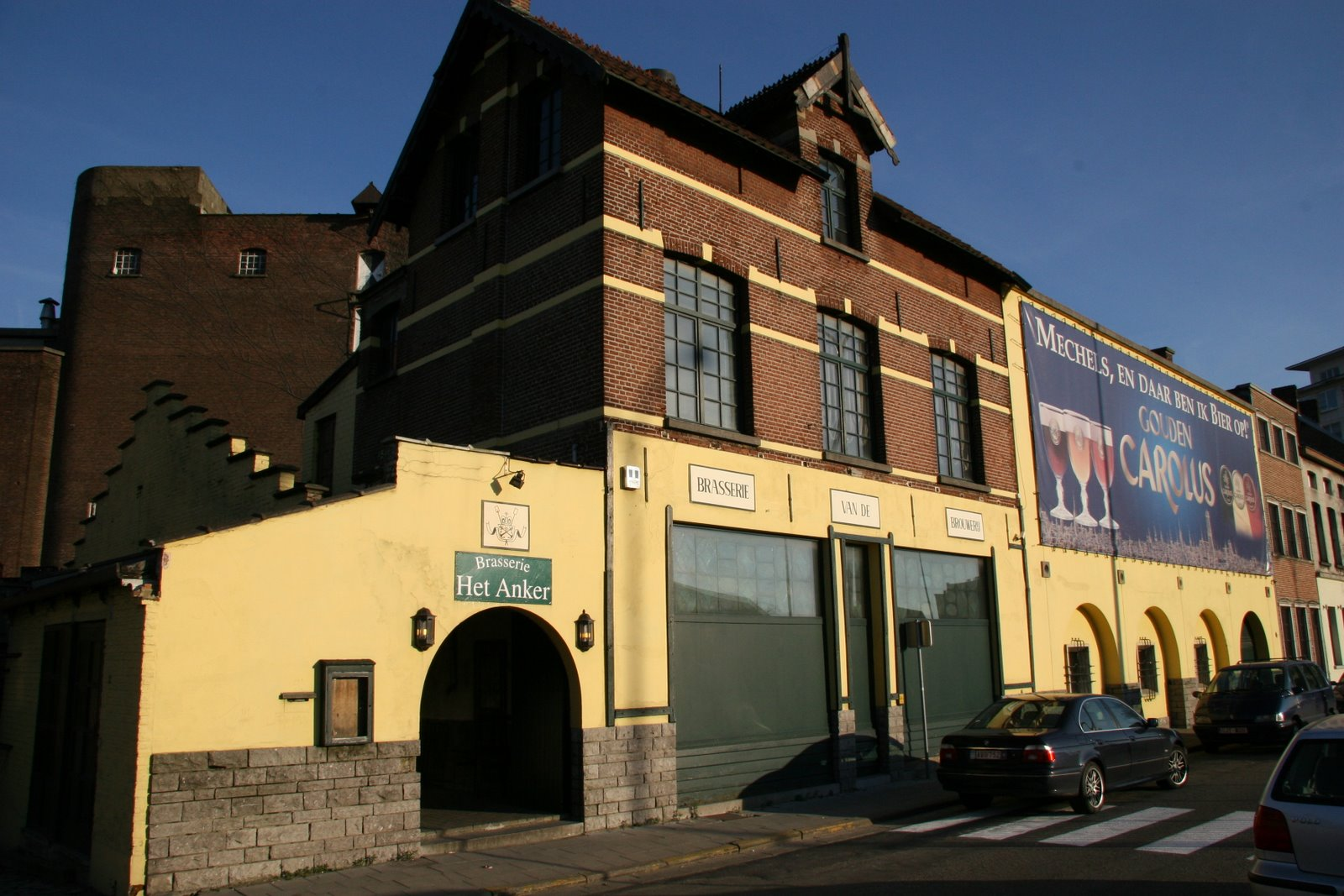
The brewery Het Anker, home of the Gouden Carolus beer

Historically famous Mechlinian trades include laken (woollen cloth), tapestries, cordwain, Mechlin lace (precious bobbin lace, already from the early 18th century), wood carving and sculpturing, and furniture.

Mechelen was at the heart of the revival of the carillon in the early 20th century, and hosts its principal school in the world to this day.

The area around Mechelen is famous for the cultivation of vegetables, among which are Belgian endive (witloof), asparagus, and cauliflower. Founded in the city, the Mechelse Veilingen in neighbouring Sint-Katelijne-Waver is the largest co-operative vegetable auction in Europe.

One of the four breeds of the Belgian Sheepdog is the local Malinois. The Mechelse koekoek is a local poultry breed, fleshy chickens with black and white feathers which extend on the birds' legs, with colours reminiscent of a cuckoo, hence the name.

Mechelsen Bruynen was allegedly the emperor Charles V's favourite beer. A version is still brewed in the city at Het Anker brewery, one of the oldest breweries in Belgium.

== Climate ==
Mechelen has an oceanic climate (Köppen Cfb). Mechelen has a narrow temperature range between seasons for its high latitude, despite its inland position. Summers are warm and occasionally hot, whereas winters usually remain above freezing. Similar to Belgium as a whole, the climate is relatively cloudy and receives frequent rainfall, often light.

Climate data for Mechelen (1981–2010 normals, sunshine 1984–2013)
Month	Jan	Feb	Mar	Apr	May	Jun	Jul	Aug	Sep	Oct	Nov	Dec	Year
Mean daily maximum °C (°F)	6.2 (43.2)	7.0 (44.6)	10.8 (51.4)	14.5 (58.1)	18.5 (65.3)	21.1 (70.0)	23.4 (74.1)	23.2 (73.8)	19.7 (67.5)	15.3 (59.5)	10.1 (50.2)	6.5 (43.7)	14.7 (58.5)
Daily mean °C (°F)	3.5 (38.3)	3.7 (38.7)	6.8 (44.2)	9.6 (49.3)	13.7 (56.7)	16.4 (61.5)	18.6 (65.5)	18.2 (64.8)	15.0 (59.0)	11.3 (52.3)	7.0 (44.6)	4.0 (39.2)	10.6 (51.1)
Mean daily minimum °C (°F)	0.8 (33.4)	0.6 (33.1)	3.0 (37.4)	4.8 (40.6)	8.8 (47.8)	11.6 (52.9)	13.8 (56.8)	13.2 (55.8)	10.5 (50.9)	7.4 (45.3)	4.1 (39.4)	1.6 (34.9)	6.7 (44.1)
Average precipitation mm (inches)	69.0 (2.72)	57.5 (2.26)	64.8 (2.55)	46.5 (1.83)	62.0 (2.44)	72.7 (2.86)	75.5 (2.97)	71.8 (2.83)	70.9 (2.79)	71.9 (2.83)	74.4 (2.93)	75.3 (2.96)	812.4 (31.98)
Average precipitation days	12.4	10.7	12.2	9.4	10.8	10.4	10.0	9.7	10.3	11.2	12.4	12.6	132.0
Mean monthly sunshine hours	58	77	122	174	207	202	212	201	145	118	64	48	1,627
Source: Royal Meteorological Institute

== Sports ==
Home of two old Belgian football clubs, founded in 1904: K.R.C. Mechelen and K.V. Mechelen. The latter contributed to the international glamour of the city by winning the UEFA Cup Winners' Cup and the European Super Cup in 1988. The number of lesser local teams shows this sport's popularity: Rapid Leest, Sporting Mechelen, Leest Utd., VV Leest, Walem, SK.Heffen, Zennester Hombeek, FC Muizen. In 1985, the city hosted the Canoe Sprint World Championships.

Home of the rugby union club Mechelen RFC. Also the Ultimate club Freespect is located in Mechelen.

== Main sights ==
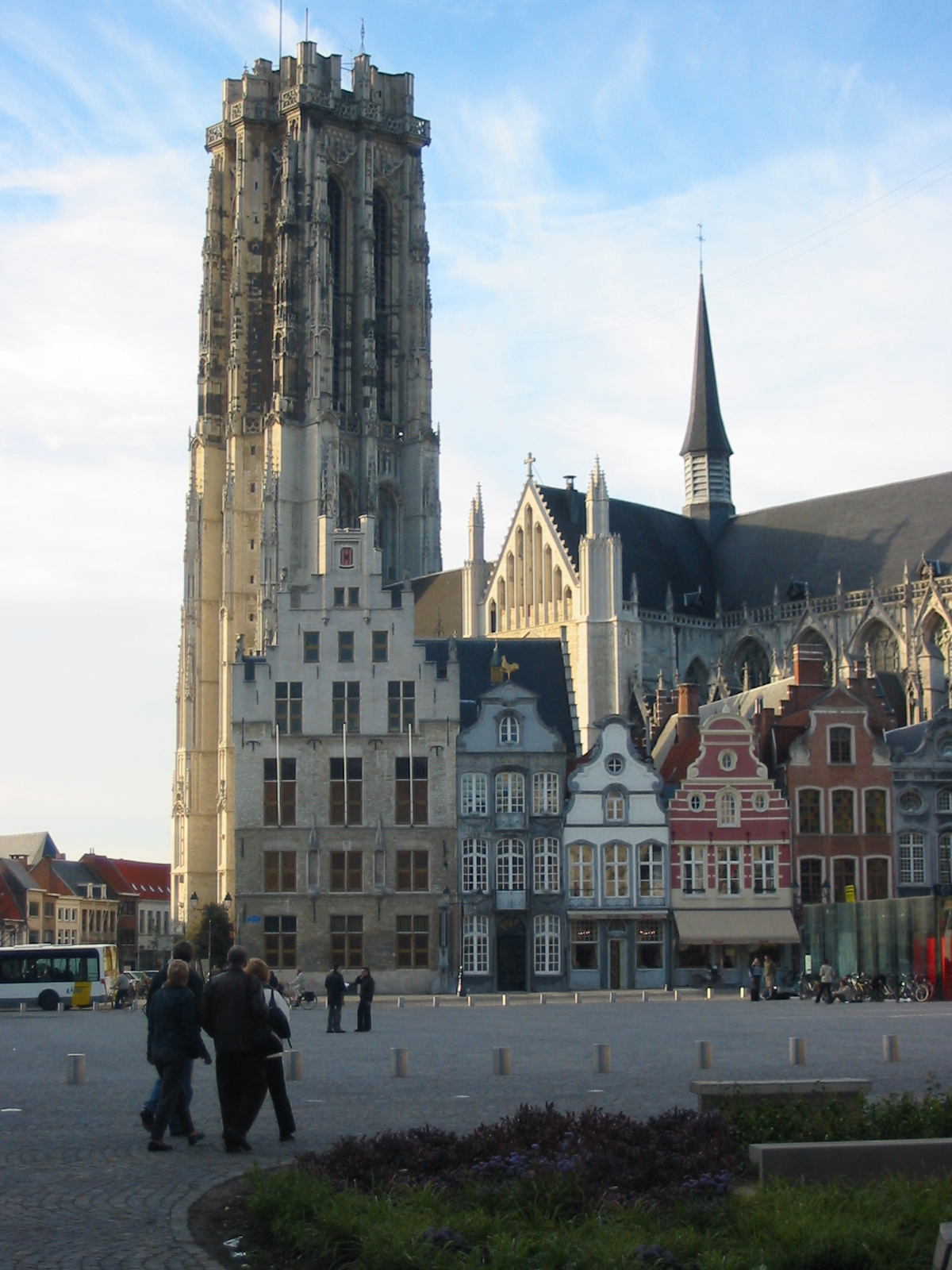
St. Rumbold's Cathedral on the Grote Markt

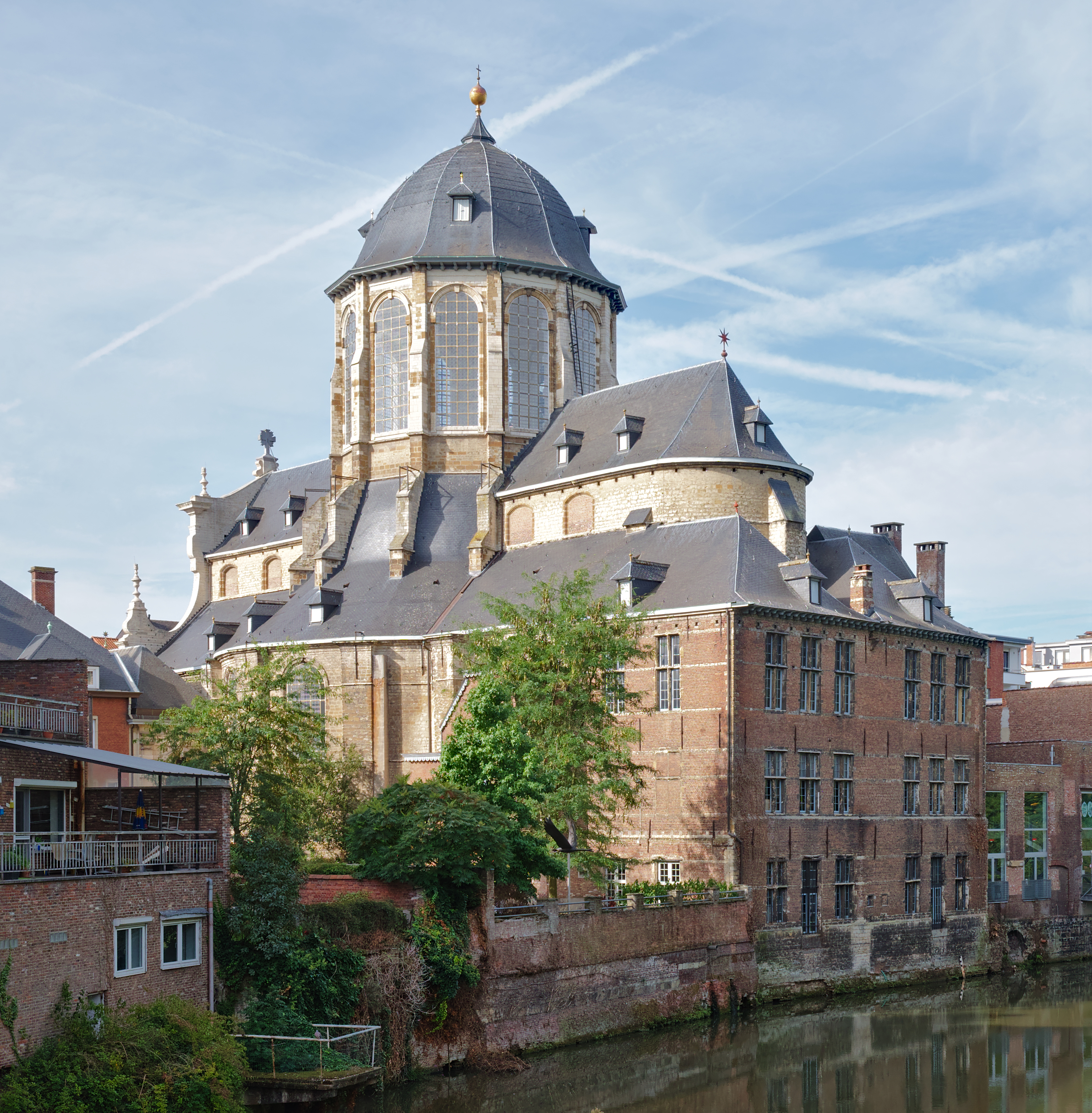
Basilica of Our Lady of Hanswijk

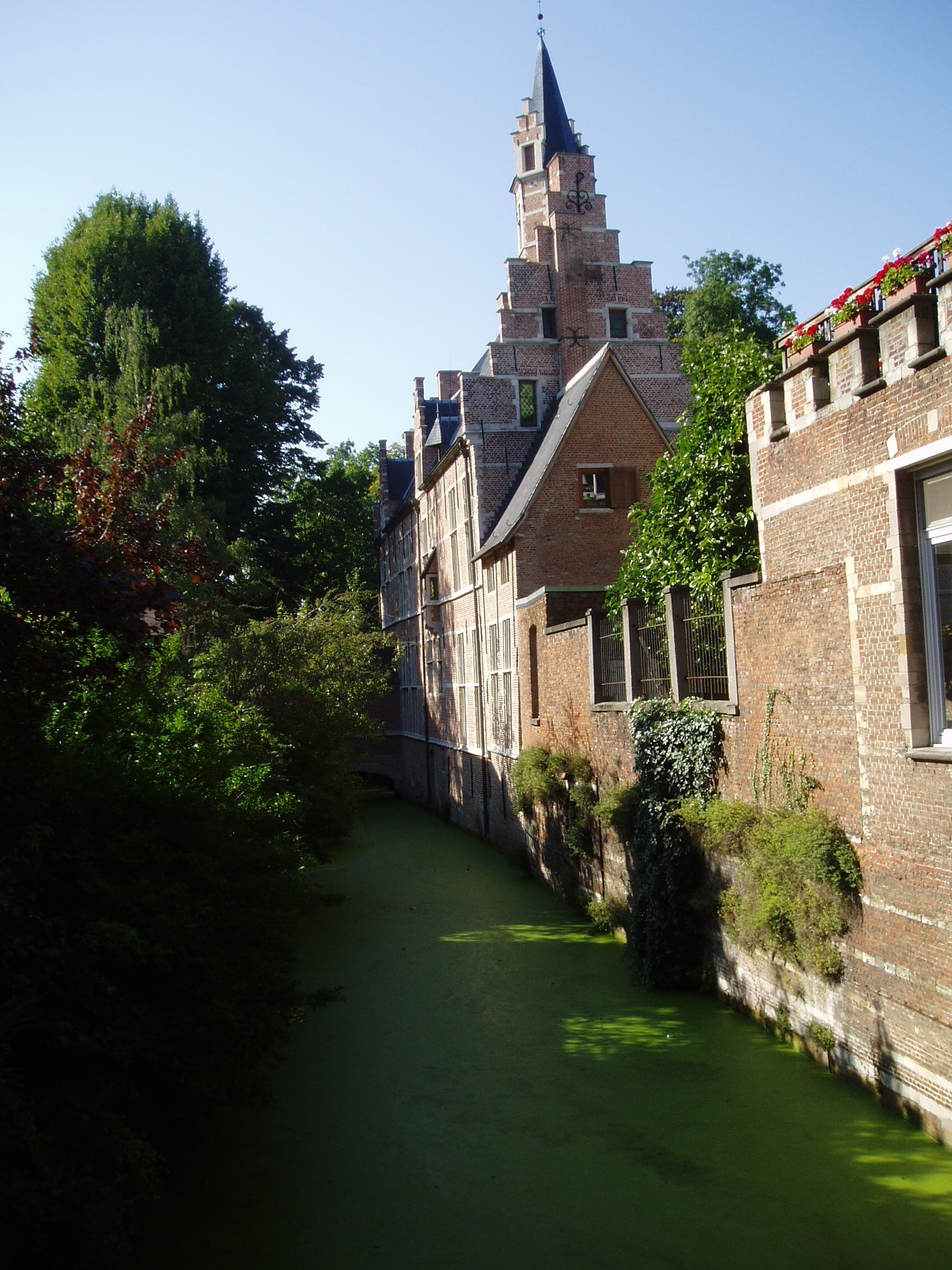
't Groen Waterke

There are several important cathedrals and churches in Mechelen. Most famous is Sint-Romboutskathedraal (St. Rumbold's Cathedral) with its dominating tower, which was consecrated in 1312 and is inscribed on the UNESCO World Heritage List as part of the Belfries of Belgium and France site. The domed, baroque Basiliek van Onze-Lieve-Vrouw-van-Hanswijk, a famous place of pilgrimage in Belgium, was designed by native architect Lucas Faydherbe, some of whose sculptures can also be found in the cathedral, and was completed in 1876. The Kerk van Onze-Lieve-Vrouw-over-de-Dijle (Church of Our Lady across the river Dijle) and the Sint-Janskerk exhibit work from Rubens, including 'The Adoration of the Magi' and 'The Miraculous Draught of Fishes' respectively. Other important churches in Mechelen include the baroque Begijnhofkerk (Church of the Beguines, dedicated to St. Alexis and St. Catherine); the former Jesuit church Sint-Pieter en Pauluskerk (Saints Peter and Paul); and the present Jesuit Church of Our Lady of Leliendaal.

Other religious buildings in Mechelen include the Palace of the Archbishop of the Archbishopric of Mechelen-Brussels, still in use for its original purpose by the current Archbishop Terlinden. These palaces may not be open to the public in general but do offer a good external view. The Klein Begijnhof and the Groot Begijnhof (Small and Large Beguinages), which house lay religious women, form part of the Flemish Béguinages World Heritage Site. The grounds of the Theravada Buddhist place of worship Wat Dhammapateep (Temple of the Flame of Truth or Reality as taught by the Enlightened One) has since 2005 housed a green granite Buddha, sculptured in China, seated on a dark green granite socle – the tallest granite Buddha in Europe.

The Refuge of Grimbergen, the Refuge of Villers, the Refuge of Rozendaal, the Refuge of Sint-Truiden and the Refuge of Tongerlo, are retreat mansions for distant abbeys, the latter now housing the Manufacturer De Wit which restores the finest tapestries, for which Flanders was famous in the 16th century.

The Lakenhal (a cloth hall) and the 14th-century belfry beside it are now incorporated with the modern City Hall complex on the main square. The hall and belfry are part of the Belfries of Belgium and France World Heritage Site for their civic importance and architecture.

The Brusselpoort, the last remaining of the city's twelve gates was built in the 13th century. Along with the Schepenhuis, the oldest stone-built city hall in Flanders and the historical seat of the 'Grote Raad' (Great Council or Supreme Court), and the gothic-renaissance Hof van Busleyden where Hieronymus van Busleyden received Erasmus, Thomas More, and the later Pope Adrian VI, now house the City Museum. The Vismarkt (former fish market) is a 16th-century square located near the heart of the city along the river Dijle.

Many famous people resided in Mechelen in the 16th-19th centuries, and their houses still remain today. The Hof van Savoye was built for Margaret of Austria while she was regent of the Netherlands and in it she raised the later Charles Quint. It is one of the first Renaissance buildings north of the Alps and was converted to the meeting place of for courts of justice in 1609. In addition, Mechelen contains the "Hof van Nassau", a 15th-century building which served as temporary court of Margaret of York when she arrived in Mechelen after her marriage with Charles the Bold, as well as the palace she resided in after Charles's death.

Other notable houses from the time period include:

- The "Hof van Hoogstraten", 16th-century palace of Antoon I van Lalaing
- The "Hof van Cortenbach", 16th-century building
- The "Hof van Coloma", 18th-century palace of Jean Ernest Coloma, Baron of St-Pieters Leeuw and member of the Coloma family

Mechelen also contains many museums, parks, and zoos:

- The Jewish Museum of Deportation and Resistance in a wing of the former Casern Dossin, built in the 18th century by Queen Maria Theresa of Austria, ruler of the Austrian Netherlands;
- Technopolis, centre for hands-on Science and Technology;
- Mechelen Toy Museum at Mechelen railway station;
- Planckendael Zoo in Muizen;
- The Botanical Garden of Mechelen (Kruidtuin), a city park with a marble statue of the 16th-century botanist Rembert Dodoens;
- Vrijbroek recreational park with around June its outstanding Rose Gardens and in summer its Dahlia Garden;
- Tivoli Park with Children's Farm;
- The Clock Museum, also known as the Watchmakers' Museum.

Mechelen also contains the Royal Carillon School "Jef Denyn" where carillonneurs come from around the world to study the carillon and to play the instrument.

Other sites in Mechelen include:

- 't Groen Waterke, a picturesque small remnant of bygone canals – in particular of the Melaan, of which a longer stretch was after more than a century uncovered in 2007.
- A stone pillar De Mijlpaal, now prominent in front of the station, had marked the nearby destination point of the first passenger train ride on the continent. The name was adopted by the railway workers' club for miniature model trains, and by a small museum housed in one of the oldest railroad buildings commemorates the historical event and consequent local industry of national importance.

There are over 300 protected monuments in Mechelen.

== Politics and government ==
The city council consists of 43 councillors, elected every six years. The mayor is Bart Somers (Open Vld) since 2001. In October 2019 Alexander Vandersmissen became acting mayor because Bart Somers became minister in the Flemish government, he retains the title of mayor. The Vld-Groen-M+ kartel got an absolute majority of seats in the October 2018 election.

The 2019-2024 city council, elected in October 2018, consists of:

- Vld-Groen-M+: 25 seats
- N-VA: 7 seats
- Vlaams Belang: 4 seats
- CD&V: 3 seats
- sp.a: 3 seats
- PVDA: 1 seat

== Police ==
The city of Mechelen uses ANPR cameras since September 2011 to check all inbound and outbound cars against a database of stolen, non-insured and cars listed for other reasons. In case of a positive match, an alarm is generated in the dispatching room, enabling the police to quickly intercept the car. Mechelen was one of the first cities in Belgium to use ANPR on this scale. As of early 2012, 1 million cars per week are checked in this way. Mechelen started this project with SAIT Zenitel.

Mechelen and Willebroek formed a unified local police zone on 1 January 2015; it was extended with Puurs-Sint-Amands and Bornem on 1 January 2023, the zone now being called Rivierenland Police Zone.

== Demographics ==
Mechelen is a diverse city with over 100 nationalities, and has a significant Muslim population. The city is estimated to be around 20% Muslim as of 2016, with much of the community of Moroccan origin.

Group of origin	Year	
Group of origin	2023	
Group of origin	Number	%
Belgians with Belgian background	55,473	62.6%
Belgians with foreign background	22,216	25.07%
Neighboring country	2,025	2.29%
EU27 (excluding neighboring country)	1,340	1.51%
Outside EU 27	18,851	21.27%
Non-Belgians	10,925	12.33%
Neighboring country	1,406	1.59%
EU27 (excluding neighboring country)	2,165	2.44%
Outside EU 27	7,354	8.3%
Total	88,614	100%

== People ==
- Margaret of York, Duchess of Burgundy (1446–1503). Note: several children who later became queens of European countries had received an education at her court.
- John Heywood, English poet (1497–c 1575)
- Margaret of Austria, regent of the Netherlands, daughter of Maximilian I and guardian of Charles V (1480–1530)
- Mary, Eleanor, and Isabella of Austria, nieces of Margaret of Austria
- Charles V, Holy Roman Emperor, brought up in Mechelen until age 17 (1500–1558)
- Anne Boleyn, future wife of English King Henry VIII (1504–1536)_{(Note: The birth date of Anne Boleyn is uncertain. From the spring of 1513 to the autumn of 1514, as daughter of a high ranked diplomat she lived either in Margaret's palace, as the later Charles Quint, if she would have been nearly his age; or just across the street in Margaret of York's palace if significantly younger. Margaret of Austria affectionately referred to Anne as "la Petite Boleyn" during a formative stage in her upbringing at the court.)}
- Rembert Dodoens, botanist, herbalist, and physician (1517–1585)
- Philippe de Monte, Renaissance composer (1521–1603)
- David Herregouts, painter (1603–?)
- Rik Wouters, Painter and sculptor (1882–1916)
- François René Mallarmé, French politician in exile (1755–1835)
- Lodewijk van Beethoven (1712–73), grandfather of Ludwig van Beethoven, and the origin of the van Beethoven family
- Jules Van Nuffel (1883–1953), choir conductor and composer
- Hans Ruckers (1540s–1598), Virginal and Organ Builder
- Adèle Colson (1905–1997), first woman in the world to earn a carillon certification
- Gaston Relens (1909–2011), painter
- Bart Somers (b. 1964), mayor who won the World Mayor Prize in 2016
- Mike De Decker (b. 1995), professional darts player

== Sister cities ==
- Sucre, Bolivia
- Dijon, France
- Yūki, Japan (1996)
- Helmond, Netherlands
- Sibiu, Romania
- (United States) Arvada, U.S.
- Lviv, Ukraine

== Sources ==
- ISBN 90-5837-089-5, Michelin's "De Grote Gids België"
