= Yūki Station =

Railway station in Yūki, Ibaraki Prefecture, Japan

Yūki Station 結城駅
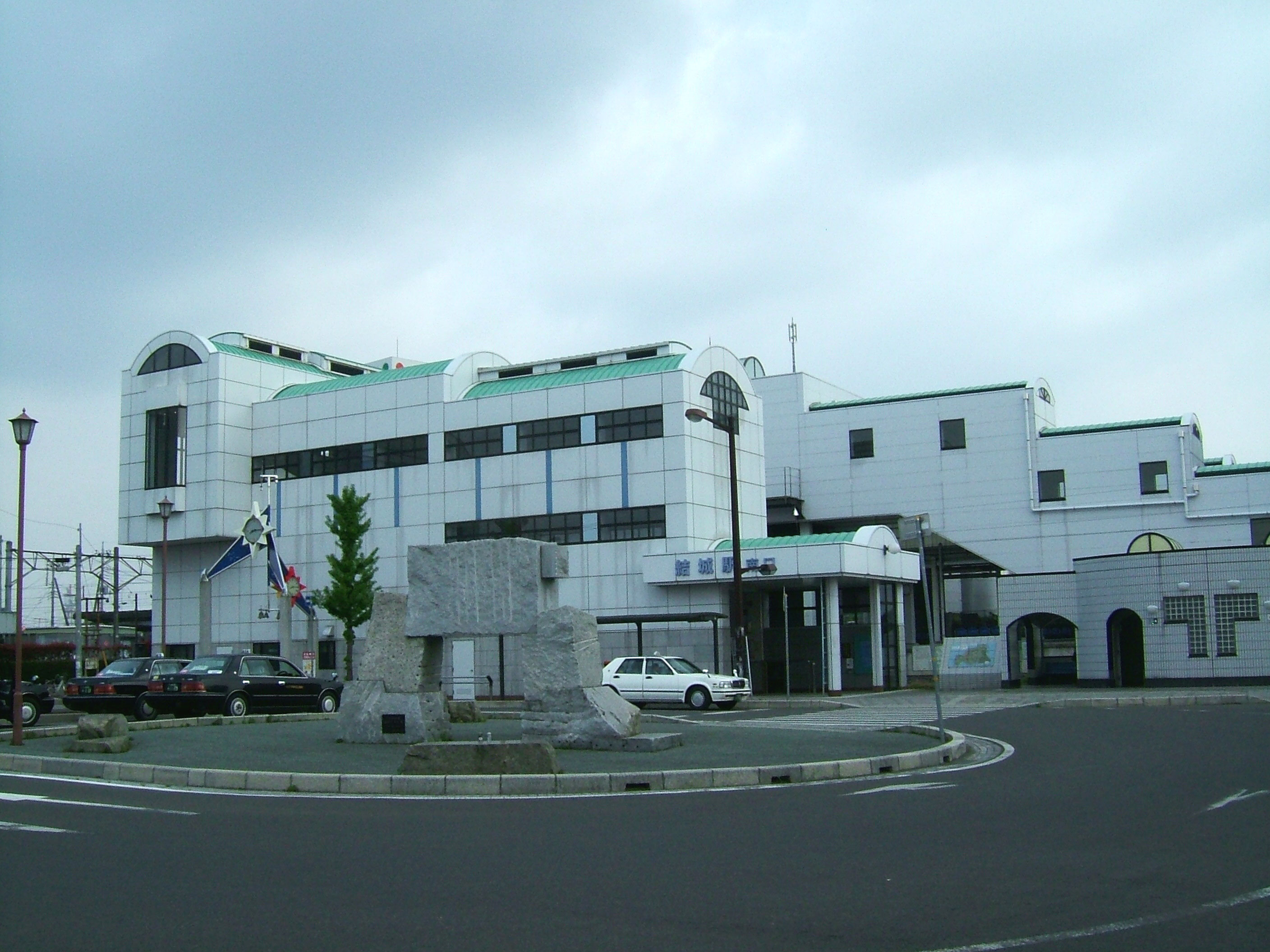
- Yūki Station, April 2008

General information
- Location: Yūki 7490-2, Yūki-shi, Ibaraki-ken 307-0001; Japan
- Coordinates: 36.2981°N 139.8734°E
- Operator: JR East
- Line: ■ Mito Line
- Distance: 6.6 km from Oyama
- Platforms: 1 side + 1 island platform

Other information
- Status: Staffed (Midori no Madoguchi )
- Website: www.jreast.co.jp/estation/station/info.aspx?StationCd=1615

History
- Opened: 16 January 1889.

Passengers
- FY2019: 2041

Services
Preceding station	JR East	Following station
Otabayashi towards Oyama	Mito Line	Higashi-Yūki towards Mito
Location
- Location within Ibaraki Prefecture Location within Japan

Yūki Station (結城駅, Yūki-eki) is a passenger railway station in the city of Yūki, Ibaraki Prefecture, Japan, operated by East Japan Railway Company (JR East).

== Lines ==
Yūki Station is served by the Mito Line, and is located 6.6 km from the official starting point of the line at Oyama Station.

== Station layout ==
The station has an elevated station building with one side platform and one island platform. The station has a Midori no Madoguchi ticket office.

=== Platforms ===
1	■ Mito Line	for Shimodate and Tomobe and Mito
2, 3	■ Mito Line	for Oyama

== History ==
Yūki Station was opened on 16 January 1889. The station was absorbed into the JR East network upon the privatization of the Japanese National Railways (JNR) on 1 April 1987. The station building was rebuilt as part of an urban renewal program in 1994.

== Passenger statistics ==
In fiscal 2019, the station was used by an average of 2041 passengers daily (boarding passengers only).

== Surrounding area ==
- Yūki City Hall
- Yūki Post Office
- National Route 50

== See also ==
- List of railway stations in Japan
