= Yūki, Ibaraki =

City in Ibaraki Prefecture known for its cultural heritage fabric production

Yūki 結城市
- City
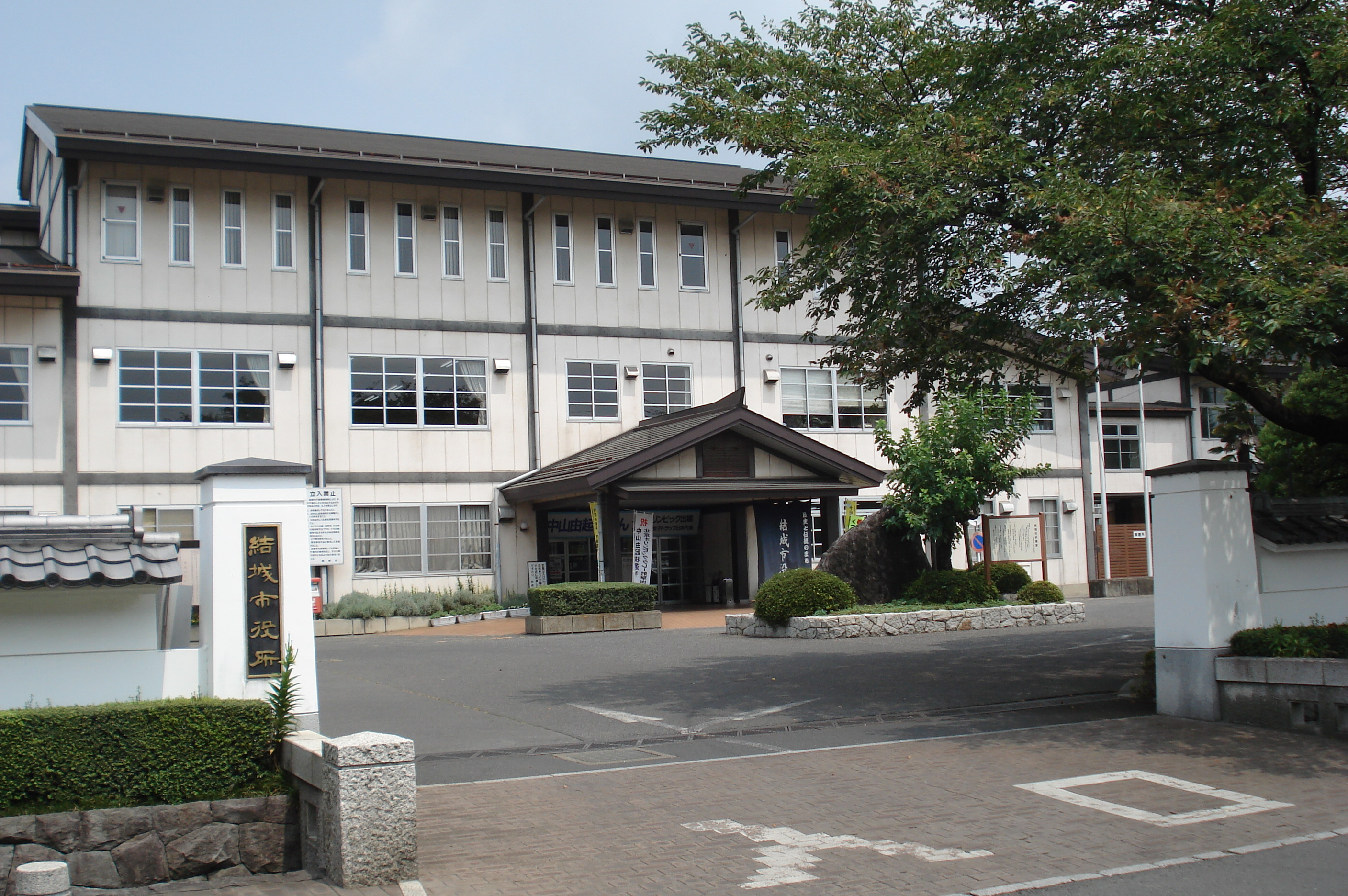
- Yūki city hall

- Flag Seal

- Location of Yūki in Ibaraki Prefecture

- Coordinates: 36°18′19.7″N 139°52′35.9″E
- Country: Japan
- Region: Kantō region
- Prefecture: Ibaraki

Government
  - Mayor: Fumio Zenba (since August 2011)

Area
  - Total: 65.76 km^{2} (25.39 sq mi)

Population (January 2024)
  - Total: 49,252
  - Density: 749.0/km^{2} (1,940/sq mi)
- Time zone: UTC+9 (Japan Standard Time)
- Tree: Mulberry
- Flower: Lilium
- Phone number: 0296-32-1111
- Address: Oji-Yuki 1447, Yuki-shi, Ibaraki-ken 307-8501
- Website: Official website

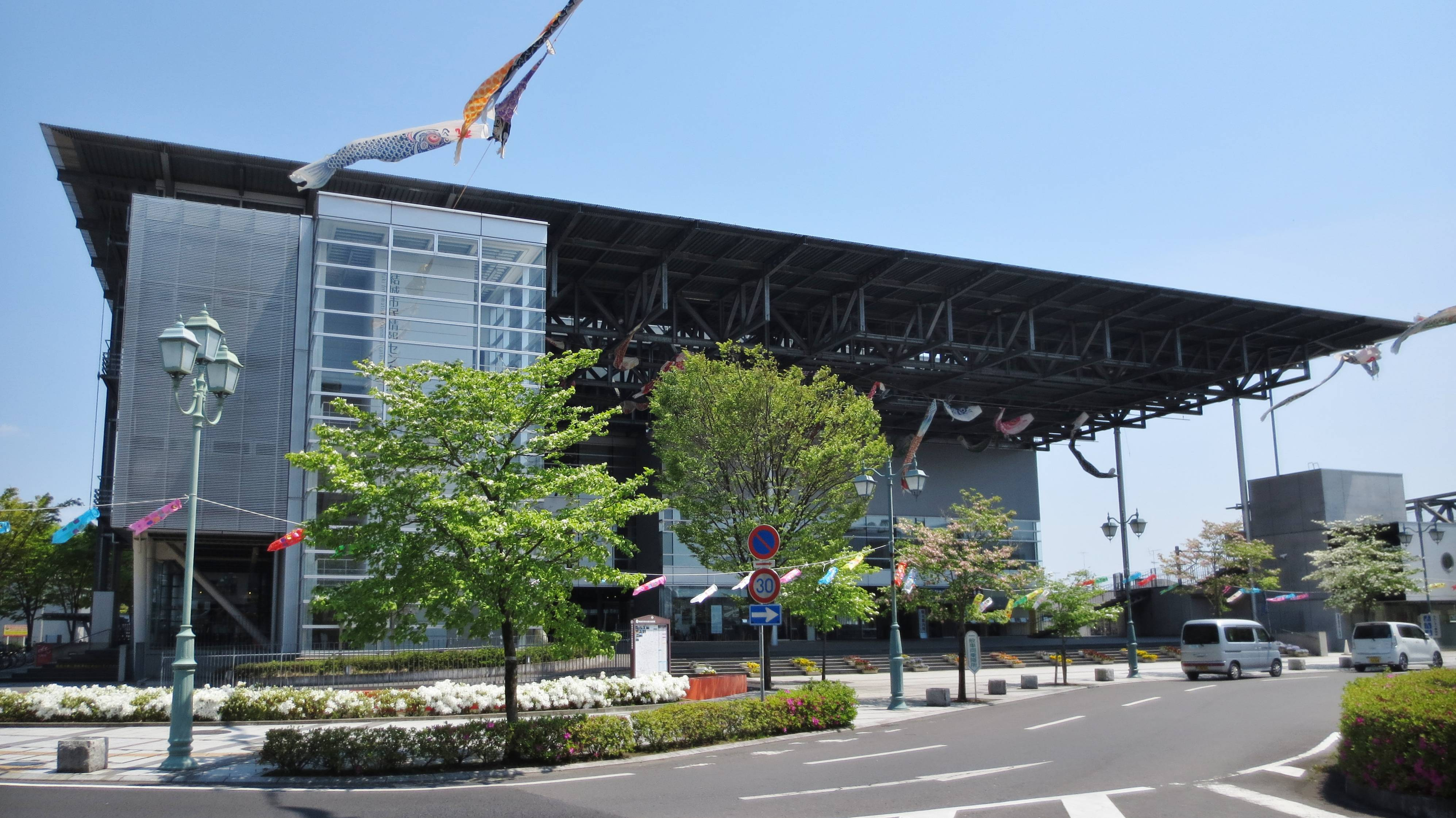
Yuki Information and Communication Center

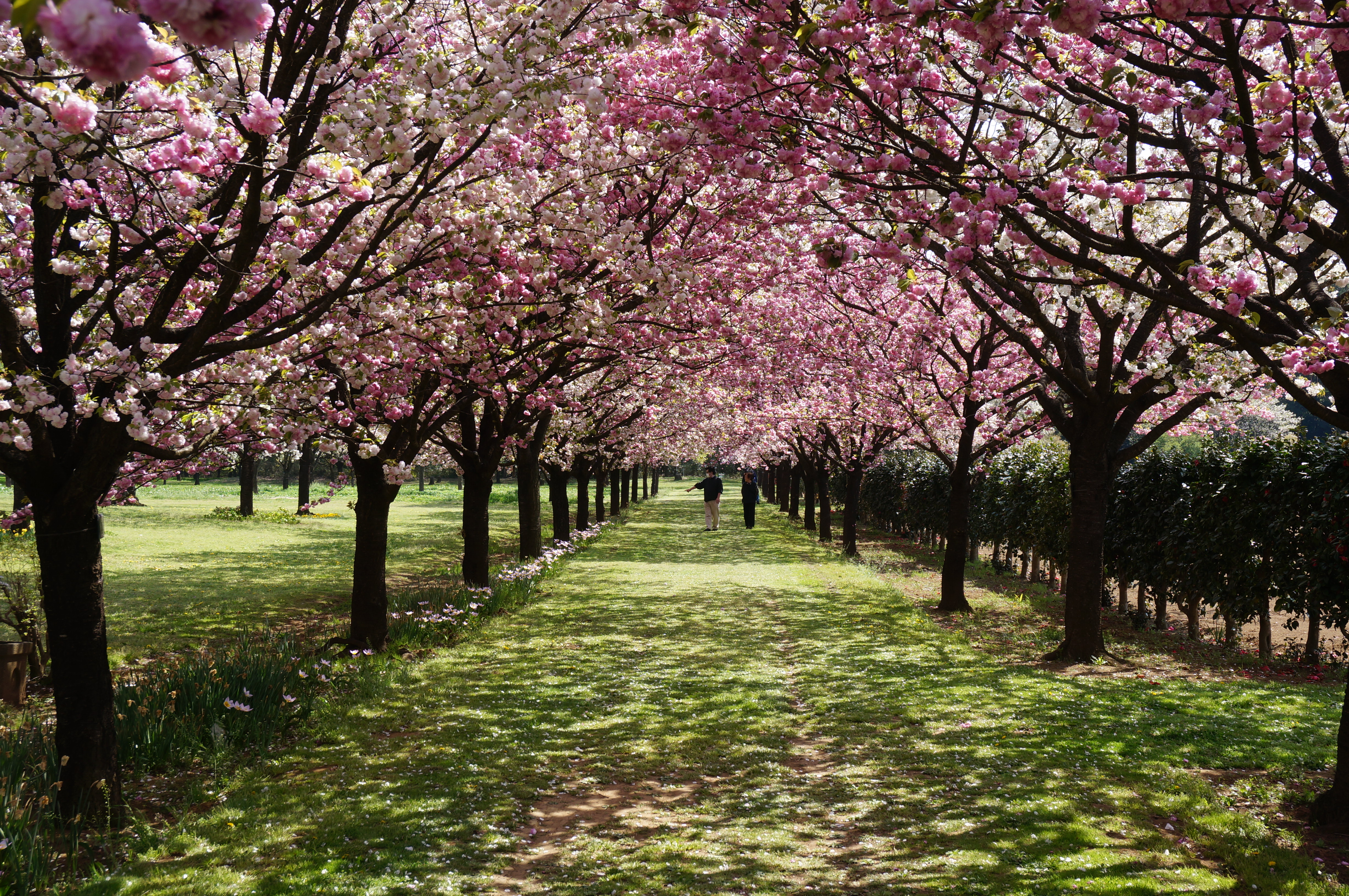
The Flower Association of Japan

Yūki (結城市, Yūki-shi) is a city located in Ibaraki Prefecture, Japan. As of 1 January 2024, the city had an estimated population of 49,252 in 19,889 households and a population density of 749 persons per km^{2}. The percentage of the population aged over 65 was 30.8%. The total area of the town is 65.76 square kilometres (25.39 sq mi). Yūki is famous for its production of yūki-tsumugi, a traditional fabric production technique which is an Important Intangible Cultural Property, and the city has a rich religious history, with many older Buddhist temples and Shinto shrines.

== Geography ==
Yūki is located in far western Ibaraki Prefecture, bordered by Tochigi Prefecture to the north and west, and separated from the rest of Ibaraki Prefecture by the Kinugawa River. It is closely related to Tochigi Prefecture in terms of culture (such as dialects), economy, and transportation due to the close proximity to the city of Oyama.

=== Surrounding municipalities ===
Ibaraki Prefecture

- Chikusei
- Koga
- Yachiyo

Tochigi Prefecture

- Oyama

=== Climate ===
Yūki has a humid continental climate (per the Köppen climate classification) characterized by warm summers and cool winters with light snowfall. The average annual temperature in Yūki is 14.1 °C (57.4 °F). The average annual rainfall is 1,321 mm (52.0 in) with September as the wettest month. The temperatures are highest on average in August, at around 26.2 °C (79.2 °F), and lowest in January, at around 2.8 °C (37.0 °F).

== Demographics ==
Per Japanese census data, the population of Yūki has remained relatively steady over the past 40 years.

Historical population
Year	Pop.	±%
1920	27,379	—
1930	30,948	+13.0%
1940	32,137	+3.8%
1950	39,894	+24.1%
1960	38,060	−4.6%
1970	39,561	+3.9%
1980	49,387	+24.8%
1990	53,288	+7.9%
2000	52,774	−1.0%
2010	52,494	−0.5%
2020	50,645	−3.5%

== History ==
The area of Yūki was an important center for the production of cotton, flax and woven goods from the Nara period. From the Kamakura period onwards, the area was controlled by the Yūki clan, who developed a castle town around Yūki Castle. This subsequently became the center of Yūki Domain which was ruled by 10 generations of a junior branch of the Mizuno clan under the Tokugawa shogunate in the Edo period.

The town of Yūki was created with the establishment of the modern municipalities system on April 1, 1889. On March 15, 1954, Yūki merged with the neighboring villages of Yamakawa, Kinugawa, Egawa and Kamiyamakawa and was elevated to city status.

== Government ==
Yūki has a mayor-council form of government with a directly elected mayor and a unicameral city council of 18 members. Yūki contributes one member to the Ibaraki Prefectural Assembly. In terms of national politics, the city is part of Ibaraki 7th district of the lower house of the Diet of Japan.

== Economy ==
Yūki has an industrial park, however, the local economy remains based on agriculture and food processing. The main crops include rice, kanpyō, lettuce, and corn.

== Education ==
Yūki has nine public elementary schools and three public middle schools operated by the city government, and three public high schools operated by the Ibaraki Prefectural Board of Education. The prefectural also operates a special education school for the handicapped.

== Transportation ==
=== Railway ===
JR East – Mito Line

- Otabayashi - Yūki - Higashi-Yūki

=== Highway ===
- National Route 4
- National Route 50

== Sister cities ==
- Mechelen, Belgium, since October 1996

== Local attractions ==
- Site of Yūki Castle
- Grave of Mizuno Tadakuni
- Yūki old town with old warehouses

== Noted people from Yūki ==
- Takeo Fujisawa, co-founder of Honda
- Katsumi Hirosawa, baseball player
- Yukie Nakayama, sport shooter
- Shigeo Nakajima, (born 1954) world champion boxer
