= Mechelen RFC =

Mechelen Rugby Football Club
- Founded: 1995
- Location: Mechelen, Belgium
- Chairman: Olivier Wellens
- Coach(es): Guy Claes
Team kit

Mechelen RFC is a Belgian rugby club in Mechelen.
