= Fish market of Mechelen =

Landmark in Mechelen, Belgium

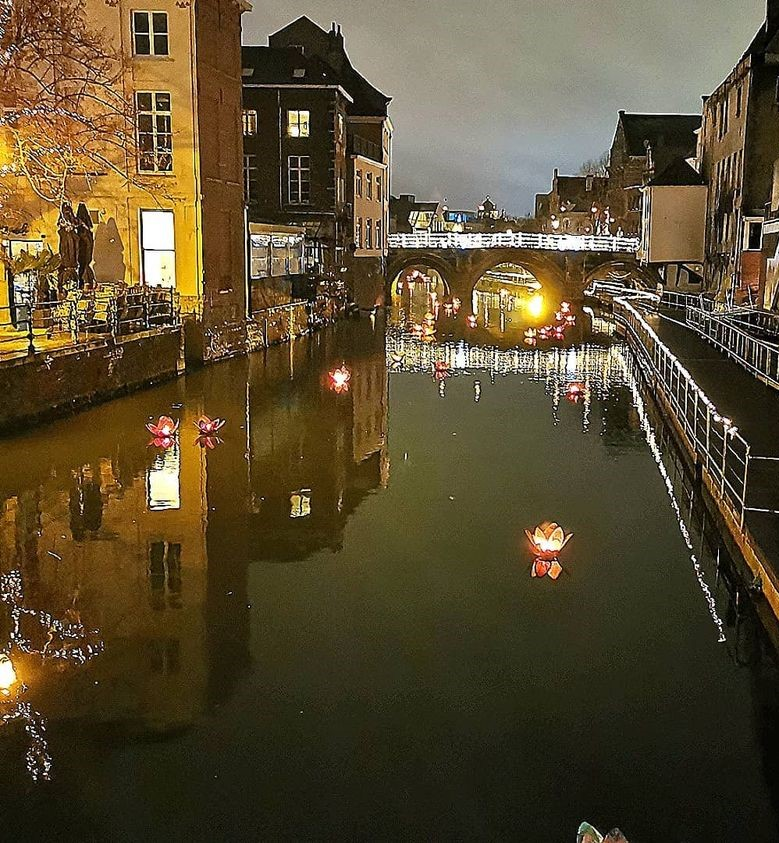

The Fish market of Mechelen (Dutch: Vismarkt) is a 16th-century square located in the heart of the city along the river Dyle in Mechelen, Belgium.

It is after the death of Margaret of Austria in the year 1531 that because of odor nuisance it was decided to move everything from the iron loan to the current fish market. Until then, there was actually no mention of the name Vismarkt but of the "Nauwstraat" of which a short street remains today as a reminder.

From then on, the rectangular square was separated from the Dyle by a brick wall and shielded by an iron railing from the 20th century. A bluestone pump (1687) and a cast iron pump (1865) were also demolished at the time." 'From the 1950's until the 1990's the place served as a parking lot. Fortunately the city decided to revalue the square'

Since 2011 the square is connected to the Haverwerf and the Lamot site via de "Van Beethovenbrug". This bridge is named after Ludwig van Beethoven the Elder, grandfather of the famous composer Ludwig van Beethoven, a musician from the city of Mechelen who had moved to Bonn at the age of 21.

The square has one side street named de Begijnenstraat (English: "Beguines street"). Notable because the name refers to the beguines, who lived in this area until the 13th century, before the first beguinage of the city was established.

In 2018, the last fish shop closed.

Nowadays the area offers an attractive mix of interior & home decoration shops, antique dealers, bars, restaurants and hotels. Combined with several urban renewal projects (e.g. the prestigious "Loretteklooster") and private investments (renovation and retirement flats), local population increased considerably in the last decade.

== Buildings ==
Due to its location the area dates back to at least medieval times.

Most buildings around the square dates back to 17th century - 19th century.

Notable:

- Refuge of Villers (14th century, rebuilt around 1577)
- House "De Drij Snoecken" (18th century)
- House "Gulden Rabat" (18th century)
- House "De Steur" (19th century)
