= Niihari Gunga ruins =

Archaeological site in Japan

- 新治郡衙跡 (Japanese)
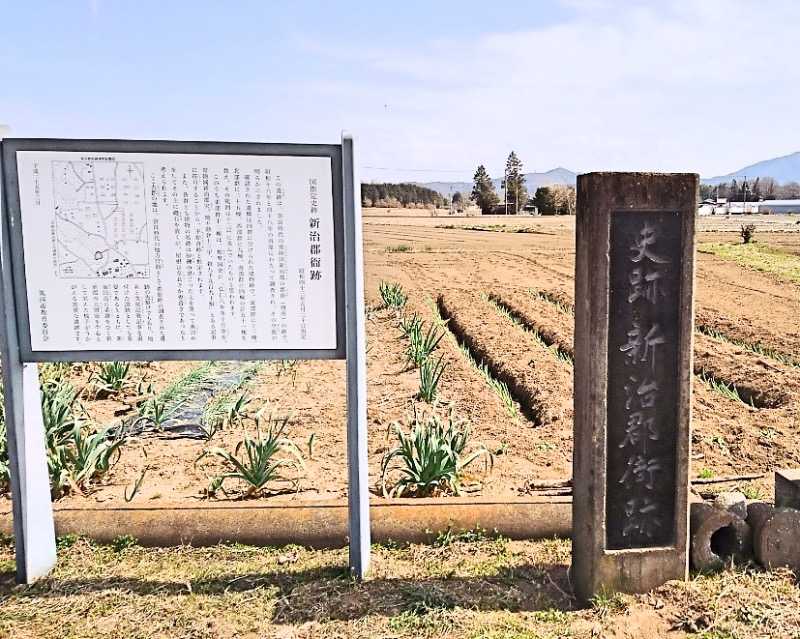
- Niihari Gunga ruins

- Niihari Gunga ruins Niihari Gunga ruins (Japan)
- 36°20′30.8″N 140°2′41.3″E
- Periods: Nara - Heian period
- Location: Chikusei, Ibaraki, Japan
- Region: Kantō region

History
- Built: 8th century AD

Site notes
- Elevation: 27 m (89 ft)
- Area: 116,615 m^{2} (1,255,230 sq ft)
- Public access: No

The Niihari Gunga ruins (新治郡衙跡, Niihari Gunga iseki) is an archaeological site with the ruins of a Nara to Heian period government administrative complex located in what is now the city of Chikusei in Ibaraki prefecture in the northern Kantō region of Japan. The site has been protected as a National Historic Site from 1968.

Gunga are ancient Japanese administrative buildings.

== Overview ==
In the late Nara period, after the establishment of a centralized government under the Ritsuryō system and Taika Reforms, local rule over the provinces was standardized under a kokufu (provincial capital), and each province was divided into smaller administrative districts, known as (郡, gun, kōri), composed of 2–20 townships in 715 AD. Each of the units had an administrative complex built on a semi-standardized layout based on contemporary Chinese design.

The Niihari Gunga ruins is located 00 to 300 meters north of the Niihari temple ruins. It was excavated twice, once in 1941 and from 1943 to 1949, and was the first ancient administrative complex to have been excavated in Japan. The ruins cover a 300 square meter area, and contain 52 building ruins in four groups. The northern group had 25 buildings, the western group had nine buildings, the eastern group had 13 building and the southern group had four buildings. Based on the layout, it is estimated that the western group was the actual administrative complex, with a large main hall flanked by side halls in a "U" configuration. The other groups all appear to have been warehouses, with the eastern group mostly granaries for storing tax rice. Each warehouse had a standardized size of 12 by 9 meters, and were arranged in regularly spaced rows of three or four buildings, although there were also a few larger buildings, with dimensions of 44 by 12 meters. The foundations are 20 to 30 centimeters below the current cultivated soil. Many artifacts such as roof tiles, around the periphery, and earthenware shards, roof tile fragments, and iron nails were discovered scattered on the surface. Many of the foundation stones have been lost, or are no longer in their original places.

According to the Nihon Kiryaku, in an entry dated 817 AD, the site was completely destroyed by a fire which originated in its eastern warehouse complex, and which consumed an incredible 9990 koku of grain. This account is supported by a vary large amount of carbonized rice found at the site. The abolition of ancient Niihari County in Hitachi Province is presumed to be due to the fire at this time.

The site was backfilled after excavation, and is now an empty field located about 26 minutes on foot from Shinji Station on the JR East Mito Line.

== See also ==
- List of Historic Sites of Japan (Ibaraki)
- Gunga (Japan)
