= Dōkyō =

Japanese monk and political figure in the Nara period

- Born: 700; Wakae, Kawachi Province
- Died: May 13, 772 (aged 71–72); Shimotsuke Yakushi-ji, Shimotsuke Province
- Religion: Buddhism
- Occupation: Monk

Dōkyō (道鏡; 700 – May 13, 772) was a Japanese monk who rose to power through the favor of Empress Kōken (Empress Shōtoku) and became a Daijō-daijin Zenji (太政大臣禅師), the rank set up for him, and later became a Hōō (法王), the highest rank of the religious world.

He served Ryoben at Tōdai-ji. He was favored by retired empress Kōken for nursing her and healing her illness. After the Fujiwara no Nakamaro Rebellion, Kōken came to the throne again as Empress Shōtoku, and Dōkyō became Daijō-daijin and then Hōō, and wielded great power. He also attempted to take advantage of the oracle of Usa Hachiman to assume the position of emperor, but was blocked by Wake no Kiyomaro. He lost his position after the death of Empress Shōtoku and was sent to Shimotsuke Yakushi-ji.

He has historical reputation as one of "Japan's Three Great Villains" (日本三大梟雄), a nickname which he shared with Ashikaga Takauji and Taira no Kiyomori; who also known with similar sobriquet as Japan's Three Great Villains by Confucian-minded history scholars due to their lack of loyalty to the throne. (Note: Not to be confused with Matsunaga Hisahide, Saitō Dōsan and Ukita Naoie from Sengoku period, who also shared similar group nickname of Japan's Three Great Villains due to their ambitious and treasonous personality, along with the habit of resorting to underhanded tactics and assassinations to eliminate their opposition.)

== Early life ==
Dōkyō was born in Kawachi Province (modern eastern Osaka). His family, the Yuge no Muraji, were part of the provincial gentry. He was taught both by a Confucian teacher and by the Abbot Gien of the Eihei-ji. Under Gien he learned Sanskrit. Subsequently, Dōkyō lived as an ascetic for several years in the Kongō Range on Honshu, where he practiced meditation and sutras; both of these practices were concerned with the acquisition of magical powers. In 748 he is recorded as being at the Todai-ji under Rōben, and in 749 he participated in a sutra copying ceremony in Nara, and was called to Kōken's court three years later.

== Rise to power ==
When Dōkyō cured the illness of Kōken in 761, after she had abdicated in 758, he attained a secure and influential place in her court; she initially regarded him as her healer and spiritual adviser, before turning to him for political advice as well. According to some accounts, he also became her lover. When Emperor Junnin attempted to remonstrate her over this latter issue, she rebuffed him and granted Dōkyō greater powers and authority. She appointed him shōsōzu (vice-rector) in 763. Fujiwara no Nakamaro, a favorite of the Junnin and Chancellor, was angered by this decision but failed in his attempt to oppose Dōkyō - he was exiled. When Kōken returned to the throne as Empress Shōtoku following Fujiwara no Nakamaro's unsuccessful rebellion, Dōkyō was made daijō-daijin within a year, giving him authority over both civil and religious affairs.

In 766, he was granted a new position, hō-ō; in 767 this position was altered to include military authority. The next year, in 768, Dōkyō persuaded an oracle from the Usa Shrine in Buzen Province to predict peace in Japan if Dōkyō were named emperor. This angered the ruling class, including the powerful Fujiwara clan. Hence, a second oracle was brought to Kyoto by Wake no Kiyomaro. It stated:

Since the establishment of our state, the distinction between lord and subject has been fixed. Never has there been an occasion when a subject was made lord. The throne of the Heavenly Sun Succession shall be given to one of the imperial lineage; wicked persons should immediately be swept away.

In response to the second oracle, Dōkyō had Wake no Kiyomaro sent into exile in Ōsumi Province.

== Policies during ascendancy ==
During this period, the height of his political power and influence, Dōkyō built a temple in Yao, Osaka. It was sponsored by Shōtoku. Its foundations were discovered by archaeologists in 2017. Additionally, existing temples received extravagant donations and ongoing building projects were accelerated and expanded. The Usa Shrine also received grants of land.

Dōkyō also actively spread Buddhist principles and the religion itself. Laws were issued banning the raising of dogs and hawks for hunting, and meat and fish were disallowed from presentation to the emperor's table.

Moreover, the power of the great clans, such as the Fujiwara, was reduced and limited during this period.

== Fall from power and death ==
When the empress died in 770, Dōkyō was stripped of his titles and banished from Nara, sent to Shimotsuke Province; the Fujiwara clan reasserted its authority over both the monastic institutions and the broader political landscape.

== See also ==
- Genbō
