= Shimotsuke Yakushi-ji =

Former Buddhist temple in Shimotsuke, Japan

- 下野薬師寺
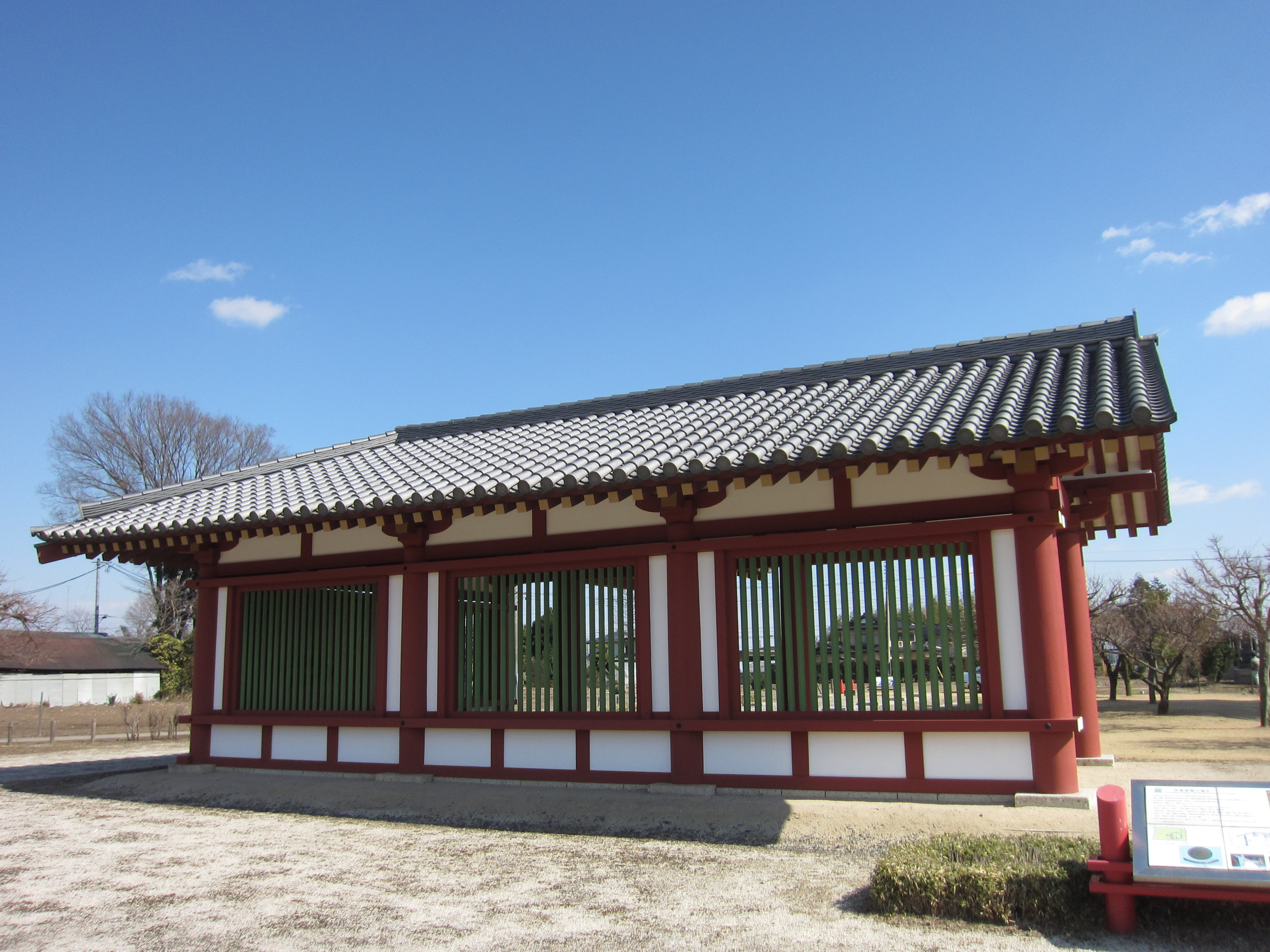
- restored cloister wall of Shimotsuke Yakushi-ji

- Location within Tochigi Prefecture Location within Japan

Religion
- Affiliation: Buddhist
- Deity: Yakushi Nyorai
- Status: ruins

Location
- Location: Shimotsuke-shi, Tochigi-ken
- Country: Japan
- Interactive map of Shimotsuke Yakushi-ji
- Coordinates: 36°24′07.04″N 139°52′33.94″E

Architecture
- Founder: Emperor Shomu
- Completed: c.687 AD

Shimotsuke Yakushi-ji (下野薬師寺) was a Buddhist temple located in what is now the city of Shimotsuke, Tochigi Prefecture, in northern Kantō region of Japan. It is one of the earliest Buddhist temples in western Japan, having been founded in the Asuka period. The temple is now a ruin and an archaeological site and has been designated by the national government as a National Historic Site since 1921.

== History ==
The Shimotsuke Yakushi-ji was located on the right bank of the Kinugawa River. Worship of Yakushi Nyorai was introduced into Japan together with the introduction of Buddhism, and many of the earliest temples are dedicated to the "Buddha of Healing". The actual foundation date of the temple is uncertain. Per the Shoku Nihon Kōki, in 684 AD, Emperor Shomu raised the chieftains of many local clans to the rank of ason, including several in what later became Shimotsuke Province. Later, in 687 AD, 689 AD, or 690 AD, he ordered that a large temple be constructed in the province with the assistance of missionaries and engineers from Silla in Korea. Per the Shoku Nihongi, the temple was of unprecedented scale, rivaling that of the great national temples which had been erected in Yamato Province, and in the Nara period, the temple was only one of three in the country (along with Tōdai-ji and Kanzeon-ji) to have a kaidan (ordination platform), which was necessary to ordinate new priests.

Roof tiles found during the 6th archaeological excavation of the temple ruins from 1966 to 1972 confirm that the temple dates from the reign of Emperor Tenmu, and that it occupied a rectangular compound 252 meters east–west by 340 meters north–south. The compound was surrounded by a moat and earthen rampart, and had gates in each of the cardinal directions. Within the compound were a Kondō and Lecture Hall and Rectory in a straight line with the Pagoda and South Gate, with a cloister connecting the Middle Gate with the Kondō, encircling the Pagoda and two smaller buildings. There was also another pagoda located outside the cloister.

In 770 AD, the monk Dōkyō attempted to seize power by seducing Empress Kōken, but was deposed. He was sent in exile to the Shimotsuke Yakushi-ji, where he later died.

The temple began its slow decline in the Heian period. With the rise of the Tendai sect on Mount Hiei with its own kaidan, and with the lack of a supporting sect of its own to provide followers, the Shimotsuke Yakushi-ji's role as primarily a seminary gradually diminished, although it retained the prestige of one of the highest ranking temples in eastern Japan through the end of the Heian period. Although receiving support from Minamoto no Yoritomo at the start of the Kamakura period as a Shingon sect temple, the growing popularity of Japanese Zen among the elites of the Kamakura and subsequent Muromachi period led to the further decline of the temple. In 1339, Ashikaga Takauji ordered that the temple change its name to "Ankoku-ji", with the intention that it would be one of the Ankoku-ji that he was building nationwide dedicated to the memory of the dead of the Genkō War of 1333 and to enhance his control over the country. However, the temple continued to use the name "Yakushi-ji". The temple was destroyed in the Sengoku period in the wars between the Later Hōjō clan and the Yūki clan.

Two modern temples now exist on part of its ruins. The temple of Ryūkō-ji (龍興寺) in the southern part of ancient temple complex, on the ruins of its former Jizō-in, contains the grave of the monk Dōkyō. A second temple, Ankoku-ji (安国寺) is located on the ruins of the Takashi-ji Fudō-in and encompasses the ruins of the Shimotsuke Yakushi-ji kaidan.

== Gallery ==
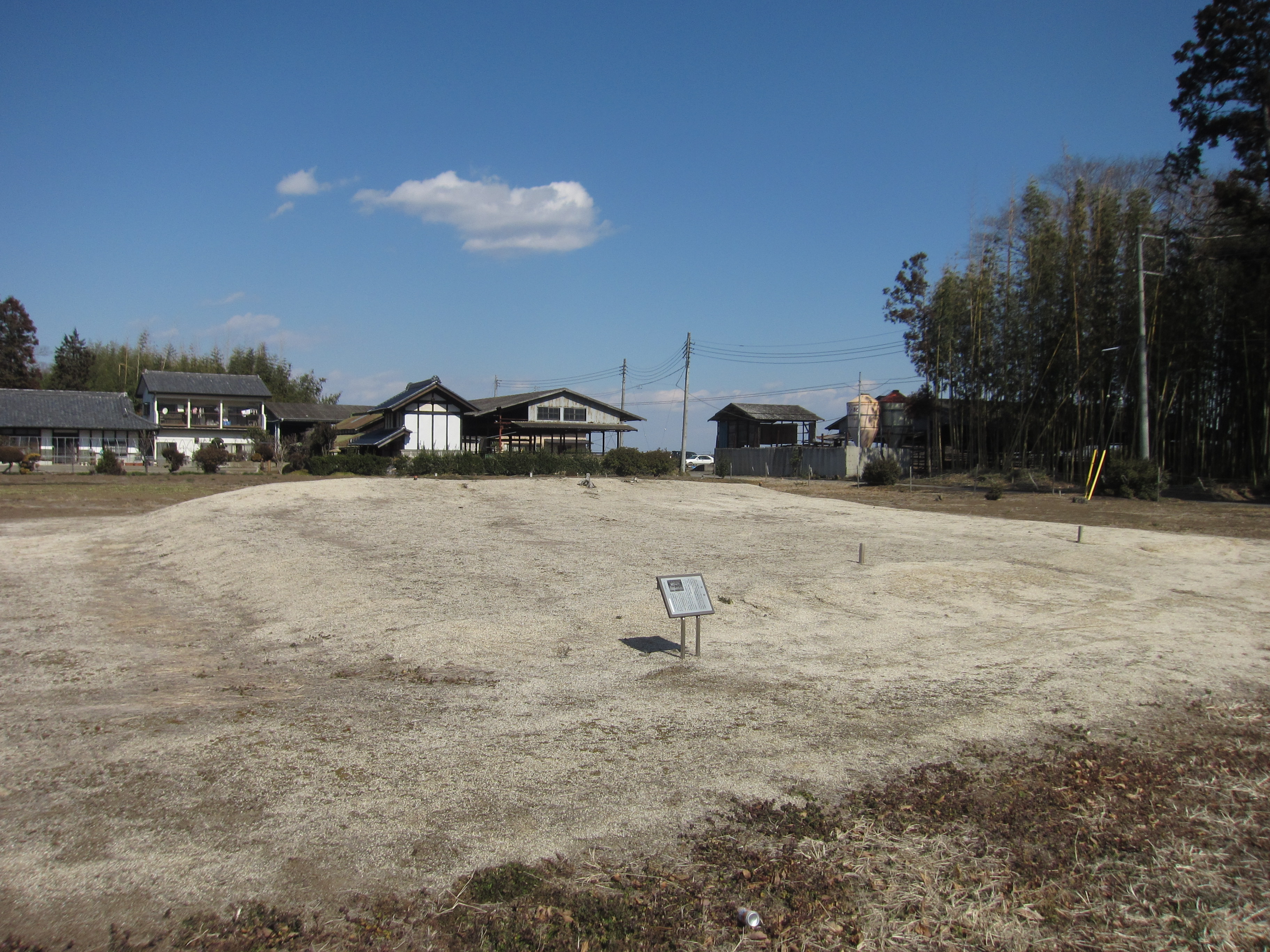
Site of the Pagoda

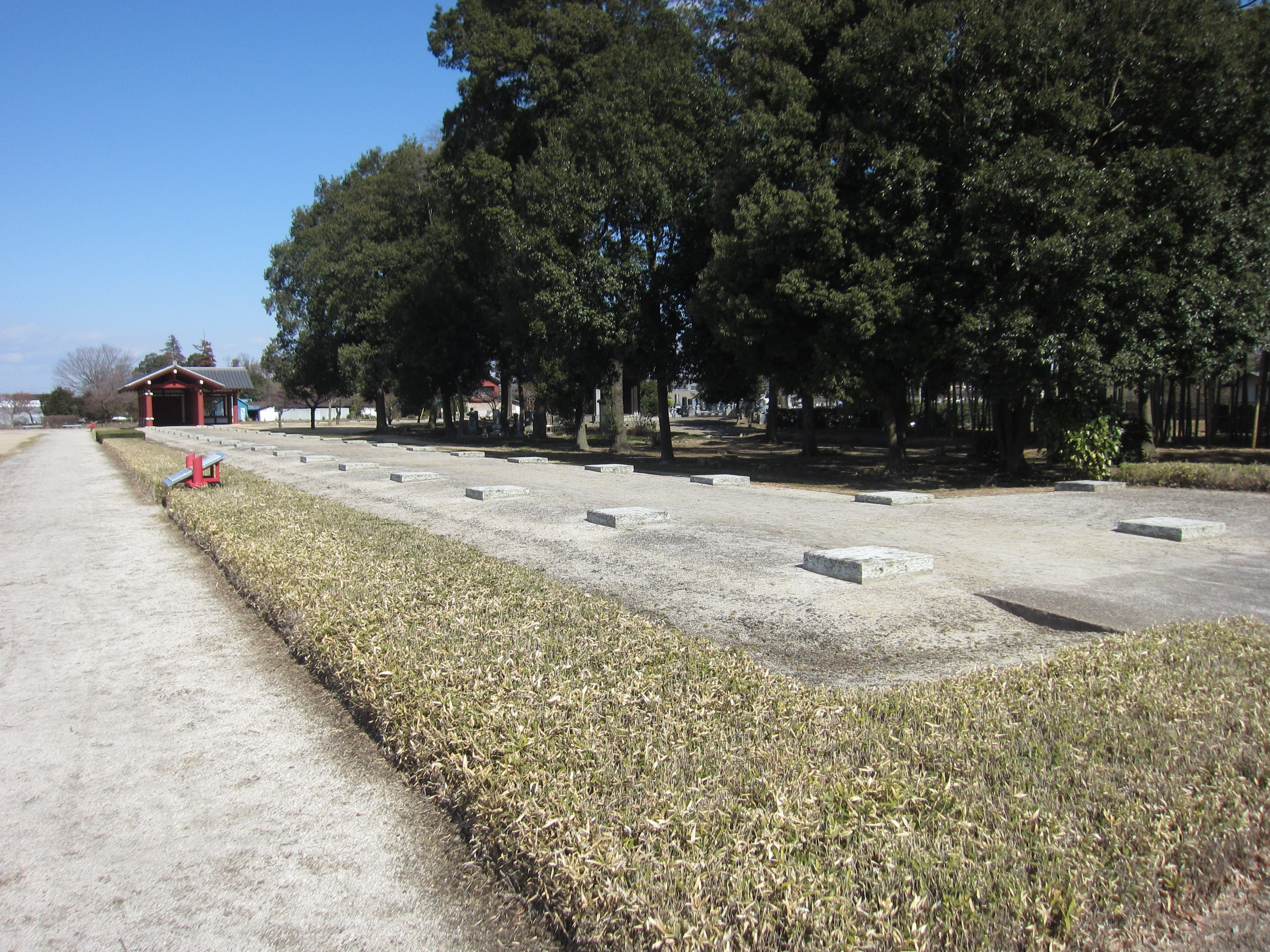
Foundations of the cloister

== See also ==
- List of Historic Sites of Japan (Tochigi)
