= Japan National Route 50 =

National highway in Japan

National Route 50
- 国道50号

Route information
- Length: 144.2 km (89.6 mi)
- Existed: 1 April 1963–present

Major junctions
- West end: National Route 17 in Maebashi
- East end: National Route 6 and National Route 51 in Mito

Location
- Country: Japan

Highway system
- National highways of Japan; Expressways of Japan
← National Route 49	→ National Route 51

National Route 50 is a national highway of Japan connecting Maebashi and Mito.

== Route data ==
- Length: 144.2 km (89.6 mi).

== History ==
Route 50 was designated on 18 May 1953 on the current route as National Route 122, and this was redesignated as Route 50 on 1 April 1963 when the route was promoted to a first-class highway.
