= Minohamagakuen Station =

Railway station in Hitachinaka, Ibaraki prefecture, Japan

Minohamagakuen Station 美乃浜学園駅
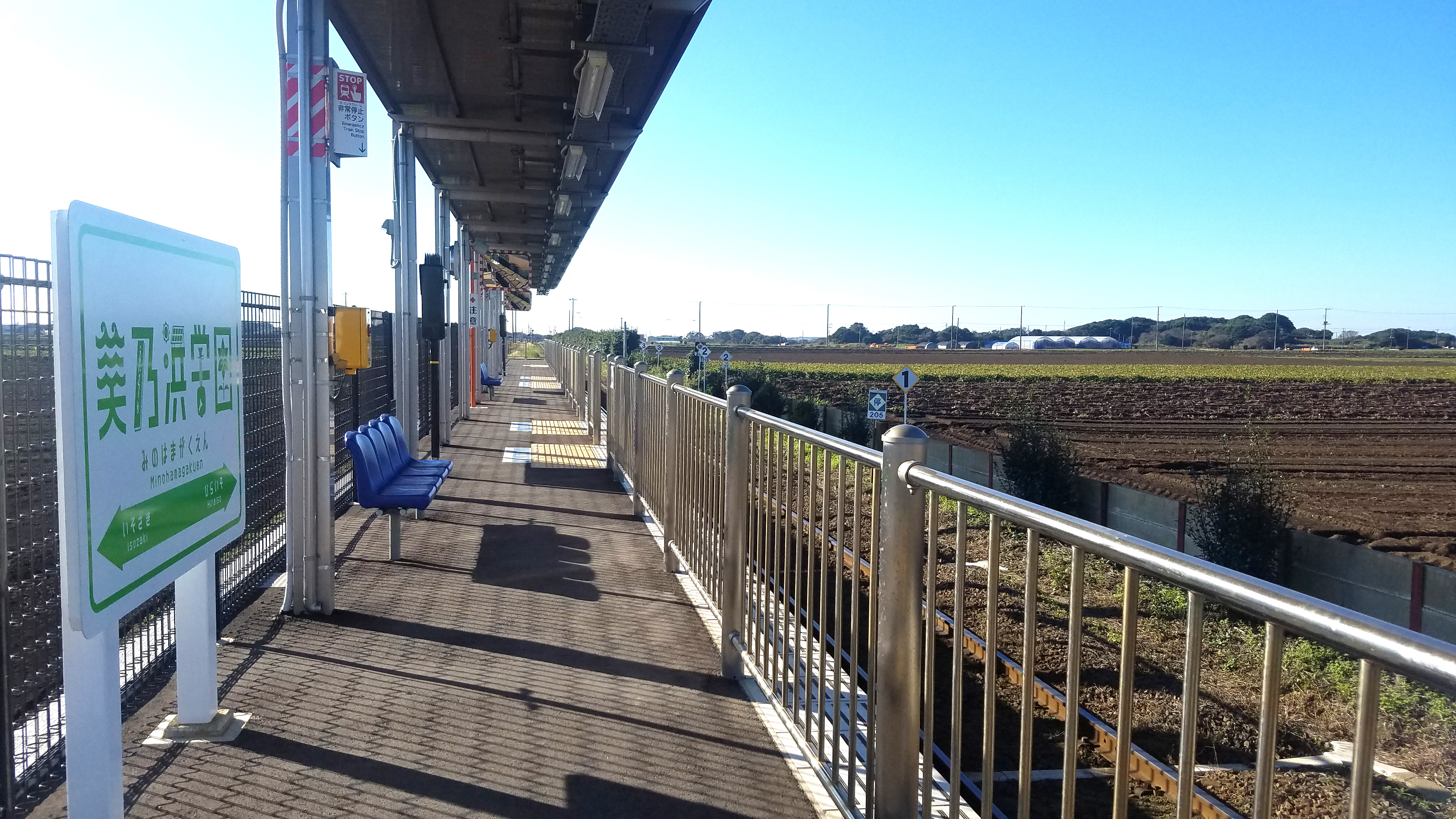
- Station platform, November 2021

General information
- Location: Isozaki, Hitachinaka, Ibaraki-ken; Japan
- Coordinates: 36.372610°N 140.616985°E
- Operator: Hitachinaka Seaside Railway
- Line: ■ Minato Line
- Distance: 12.6 km from Katsuta
- Platforms: 1 (1 side platform)
- Tracks: 1

Construction
- Structure type: At-grade

Other information
- Status: Unstaffed

History
- Opening: 13 March 2021

Services
Preceding station	Hitachinaka Seaside Railway	Following station
Hiraiso towards Katsuta	Minato Line	Isozaki towards Ajigaura
Location
- Location within Ibaraki Prefecture Location within Japan

Minohamagakuen Station (美乃浜学園駅, Minohamagakuen-eki) is a passenger railway station on the Minato Line in the city of Hitachinaka, Ibaraki, Japan, operated by the third-sector railway operator Hitachinaka Seaside Railway. Built as an infill station, it serves a new school located near the station, named Minohama Gakuen. The station opened on 13 March 2021.

== Lines ==
Minohamagakuen Station is served by the 14.3 km (8.9 mi) single-track Hitachinaka Seaside Railway Minato Line from Katsuta to Ajigaura, and is located between Hiraiso and Isozaki stations, 12.6 km (7.8 mi) from the starting point of the line at Katsuta.

== Station layout ==
The station, which is unstaffed, consists of a single side platform featuring fences to prevent passengers from falling onto the tracks.

== History ==
The station was built concurrently with Minohama Gakuen ("Minohama School"), a nearby school for elementary through junior high students which formed as a merging of previous schools in Hitachinaka, Ibaraki. The name of the school and station originates from beaches on Isozaki which were named "Minohama" in Man'yōshū.

Subsidies for the station's construction were paid by JRTT. The name of the new station was formally unveiled on 26 May 2020. It opened in March 2021.

== Surrounding area ==
- Minohama School

== Bus routes ==
Smile Aozora Bus

- For Nakaminato Station
- For Ajigaura Station

== See also ==
- List of railway stations in Japan
