= Kaneage Station =

Railway station in Hitachinaka, Ibaraki Prefecture, Japan

Kaneage Station 金上駅
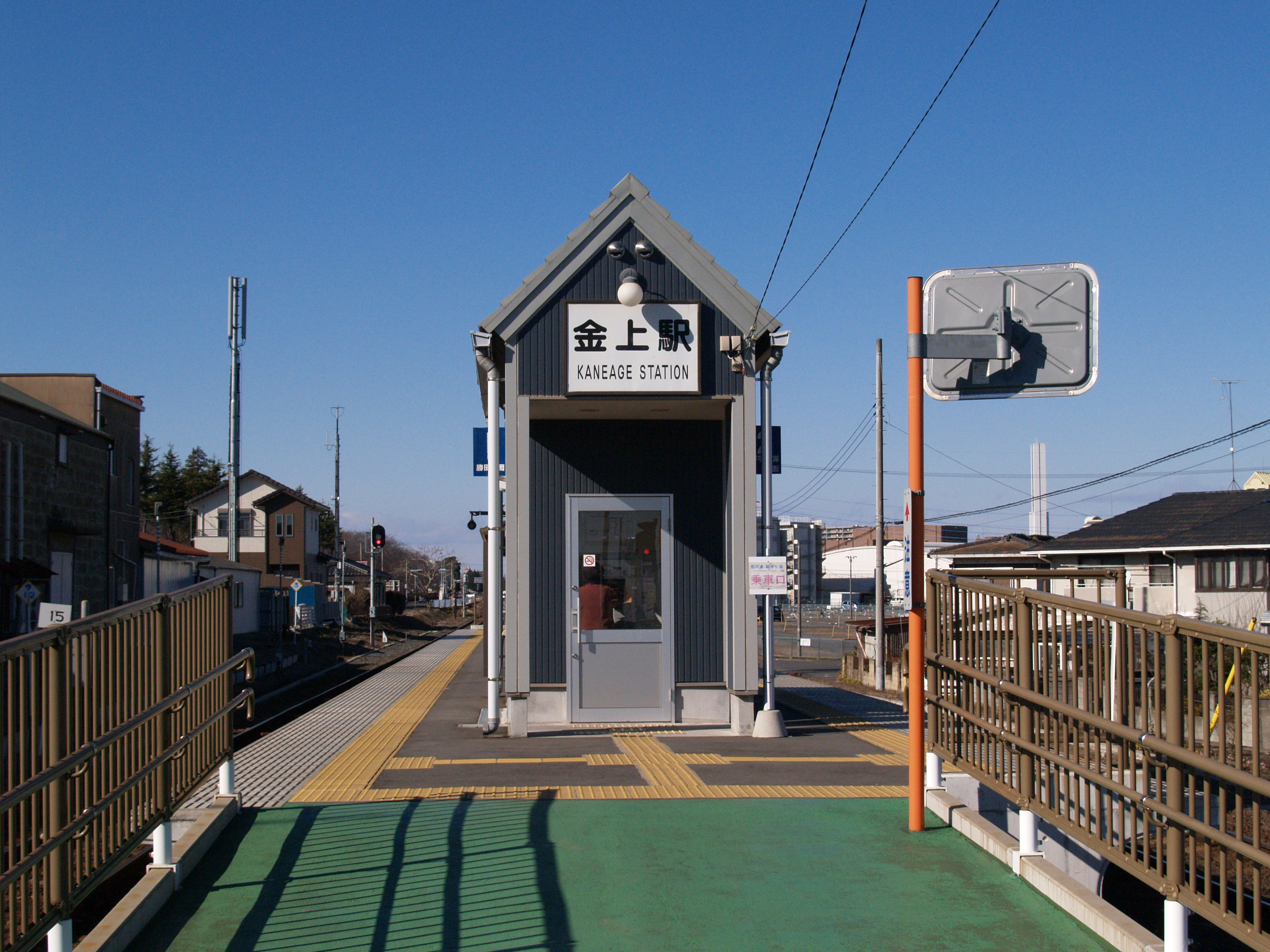
- Kaneage Station, January 2014

General information
- Location: Odaira 4-chome, Hitachinaka-shi, Ibaraki-ken 312-0023; Japan
- Coordinates: 36.3824°N 140.5340°E
- Operator: Hitachinaka Seaside Railway
- Line: ■ Minato Line
- Distance: 1.8 km from Katsuta
- Platforms: 2 (1 island platform)
- Tracks: 2

Other information
- Status: Unstaffed
- Website: Official website

History
- Opened: 17 July 1928

Passengers
- FY2011: 90 daily

Services
| Preceding station | Hitachinaka Seaside Railway | Following station |
|---|---|---|
| Kōkimae towards Katsuta | Minato Line | Nakane towards Ajigaura |
Location
- Location within Ibaraki Prefecture Location within Japan

Kaneage Station (金上駅, Kaneage-eki) is a passenger railway station on the Minato Line in the city of Hitachinaka, Ibaraki, Japan, operated by the third-sector railway operator Hitachinaka Seaside Railway.

== Lines ==
Kaneage Station is served by the 14.3 km single-track Hitachinaka Seaside Railway Minato Line from Katsuta to Ajigaura, and lies 1.8 km from the starting point of the line at Katsuta.

== Station layout ==
The station is unstaffed and consists of a single island platform serving two tracks. The station building is located directly on the platform.

=== Platforms ===
| 1 | ■ Minato Line | for Katsuta |
| 2 | ■ Minato Line | for Nakaminato and Ajigaura |

== History ==
Kaneage Station opened on 17 July 1928 as a station on the Minato Railway.

== Passenger statistics ==
In fiscal 2011, the station was used by an average of 90 passengers daily.

== Surrounding area ==
- JGSDF Camp Katsuta
- JGSDF Engineer School

== See also ==
- List of railway stations in Japan
