= Takadano-tekkyō Station =

Railway station in Hitachinaka, Ibaraki Prefecture, Japan

Takadano-tekkyō Station 高田の鉄橋駅
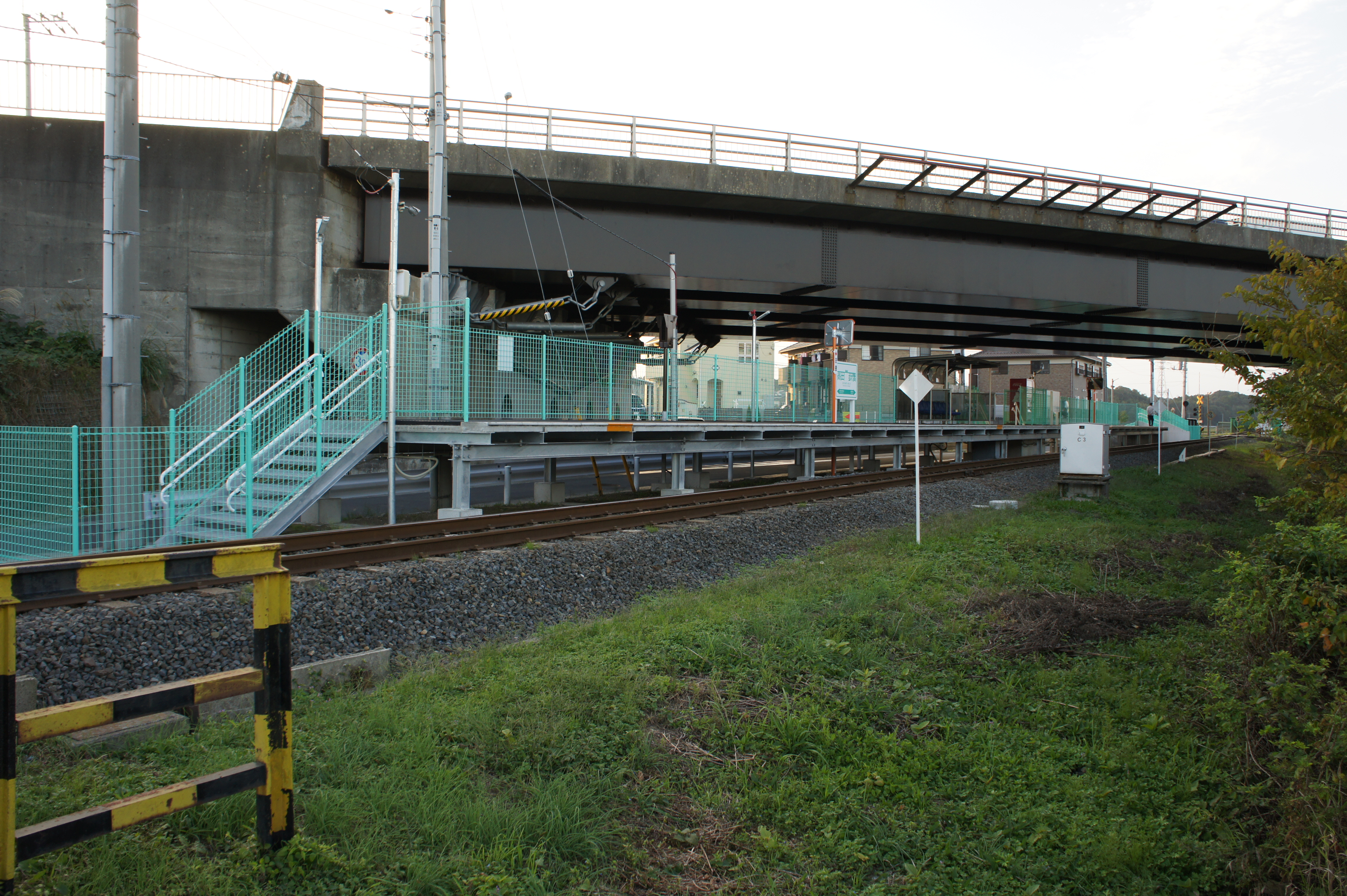
- The station platform in October 2014

General information
- Location: Mineushiro, Hitachinaka-shi, Ibarak-ken 311-1234; Japan
- Coordinates: 36°21′09″N 140°34′48″E
- Operator: Hitachinaka Seaside Railway
- Line: ■ Minato Line
- Distance: 7.1 km from Katsuta
- Platforms: 1 (1 side platform)
- Tracks: 1

Other information
- Status: Unstaffed
- Website: Official website

History
- Opened: 1 October 2014

Passengers
- FY2018: 64 daily

Services
Preceding station	Hitachinaka Seaside Railway	Following station
Nakane towards Katsuta	Minato Line	Nakaminato towards Ajigaura
Location
- Location within Ibaraki Prefecture Location within Japan

Takadano-tekkyō Station (高田の鉄橋駅, Takadanotekkyō-eki) is a passenger railway station on the Minato Line in the city of Hitachinaka, Ibaraki, Japan, operated by the third-sector railway operator Hitachinaka Seaside Railway. It opened on 1 October 2014, the first new station to open on the line in 52 years.

== Lines ==
Takadano-tekkyō Station is served by the 14.3 km single-track Hitachinaka Seaside Railway Minato Line from Katsuta to Ajigaura, and is located between Nakane and Nakaminato stations, 7.1 km from the starting point of the line at Katsuta.

== Station layout ==
The station consists of a single side platform, and is unstaffed.

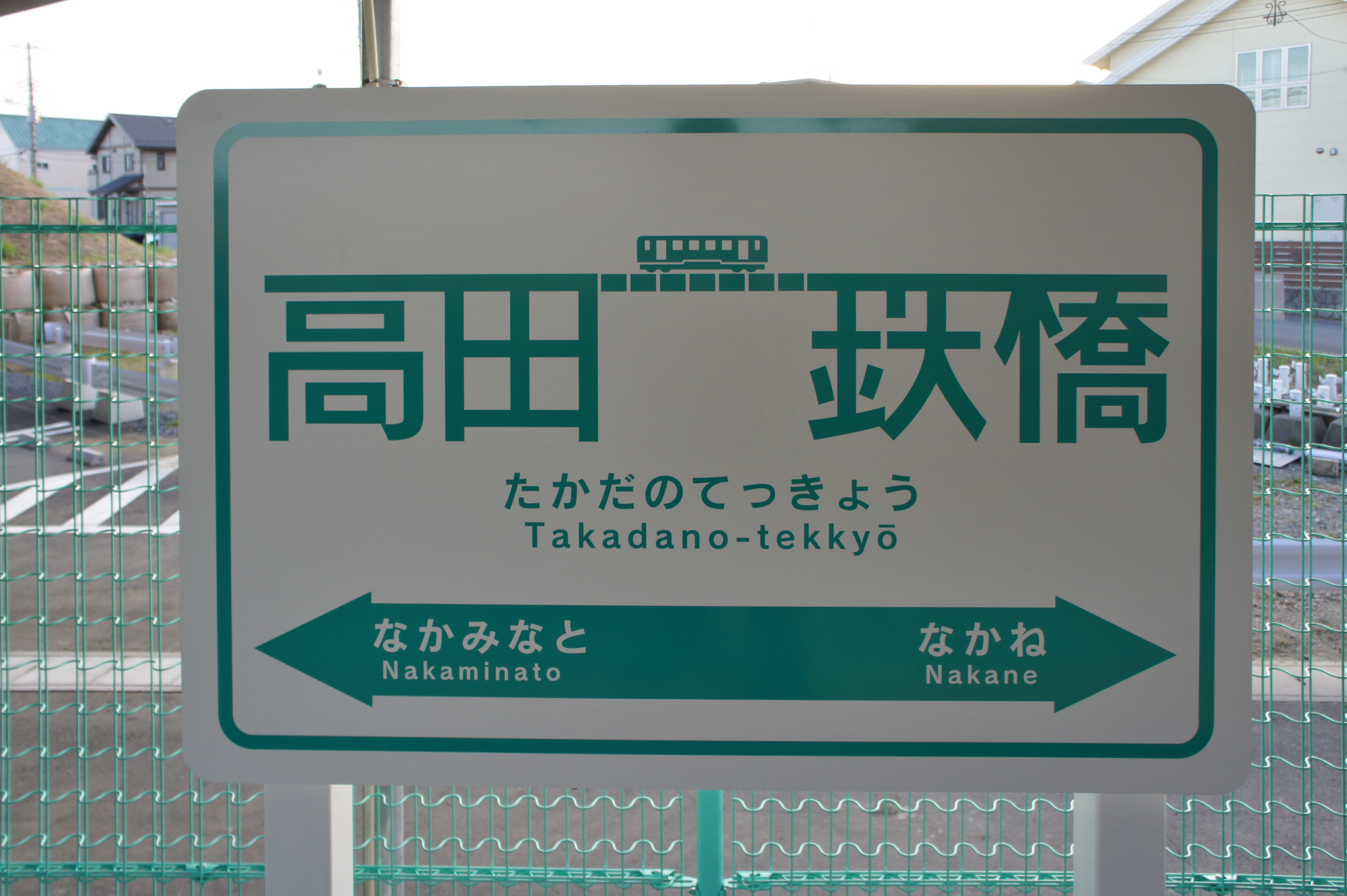
The station sign, October 2014

== History ==
The name of the new station was formally unveiled on 15 December 2013. It opened on 1 October 2014.

== Surrounding area ==
The station takes its name from a steel bridge (tekkyō in Japanese) across the Nakamaru River, and translates as the "Railway Bridge in Takada".

== See also ==
- List of railway stations in Japan
