= Nakane Station =

Railway station in Hitachinaka, Ibaraki Prefecture, Japan

Nakane Station 中根駅
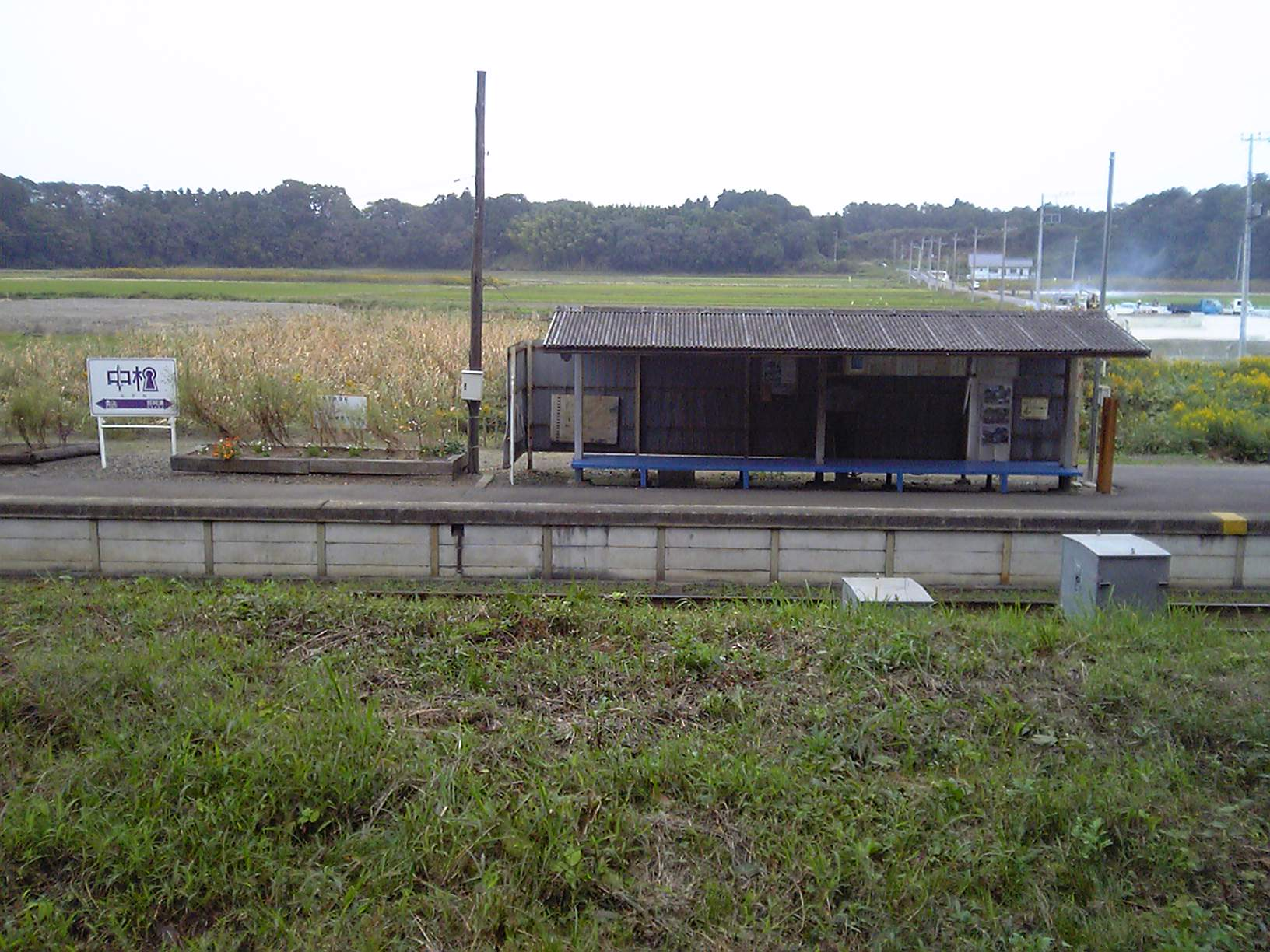
- Nakane Station, October 2009

General information
- Location: Yanagisawa, Hitachinaka-shi, Ibaraki-ken 311-1231; Japan
- Coordinates: 36.3677°N 140.5622°E
- Operator: Hitachinaka Seaside Railway
- Line: ■ Minato Line
- Distance: 4.8 km from Katsuta
- Platforms: 1 (1 side platform)
- Tracks: 1

Other information
- Status: Unstaffed
- Website: Official website

History
- Opened: 16 July 1931

Passengers
- FY2011: 22 daily

Services
Preceding station	Hitachinaka Seaside Railway	Following station
Kaneage towards Katsuta	Minato Line	Takadano-tekkyō towards Ajigaura
Location
- Location within Ibaraki Prefecture Location within Japan

Nakane Station (中根駅, Nakane-eki) is a passenger railway station on the Minato Line in the city of Hitachinaka, Ibaraki, Japan, operated by the third-sector railway operator Hitachinaka Seaside Railway.

== Lines ==
Nakane Station is served by the 14.3 kilometres (8.9 mi) single-track Hitachinaka Seaside Railway Minato Line from Katsuta to Ajigaura, and lies 4.8 kilometres (3.0 mi) from the starting point of the line at Katsuta.

== Station layout ==
The station is unstaffed and consists of a single side platform with a simple passenger waiting shelter.

== History ==
Nakane Station opened on 16 July 1931.

== Passenger statistics ==
In fiscal 2011, the station was used by an average of 22 passengers daily.

== Surrounding area ==
- Nakane Onsen
- Torazuka kofun

== See also ==
- List of railway stations in Japan
