= Tonoyama Station =

Railway station in Hitachinaka, Ibaraki Prefecture, Japan

Tonoyama Station 殿山駅
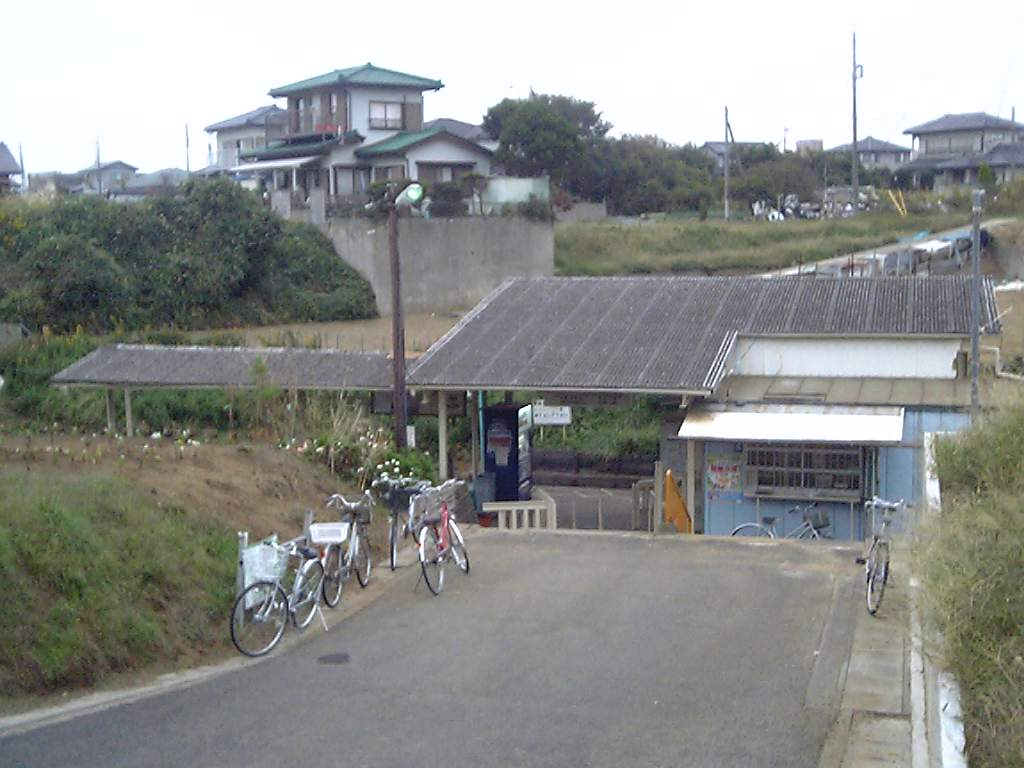
- Tonoyama Station, October 2009

General information
- Location: Asainai, Hitachinaka-shi, Ibaraki-ken 311-1264; Japan
- Coordinates: 36.3497°N 140.6010°E
- Operator: Hitachinaka Seaside Railway
- Line: ■ Minato Line
- Distance: 9.6 km from Katsuta
- Platforms: 1 (1 side platform)
- Tracks: 1

Other information
- Status: Unstaffed
- Website: Official website

History
- Opened: 17 July 1928

Passengers
- FY2011: 113 daily

Services
Preceding station	Hitachinaka Seaside Railway	Following station
Nakaminato towards Katsuta	Minato Line	Hiraiso towards Ajigaura
Location
- Location within Ibaraki Prefecture Location within Japan

Tonoyama Station (殿山駅, Tonoyama-eki) is a passenger railway station on the Minato Line in the city of Hitachinaka, Ibaraki, Japan, operated by the third-sector railway operator Hitachinaka Seaside Railway.

== Lines ==
Tonoyama Station is served by the 14.3 km single-track Hitachinaka Seaside Railway Minato Line from Katsuta to Ajigaura, and lies 9.6 km from the starting point of the line at Katsuta.

== Station layout ==
The station is unstaffed and consists of a single side platform serving the single-track line.

== History ==
Tonoyama Station opened on 17 July 1928 as a station on the Minato Railway.

== Passenger statistics ==
In fiscal 2011, the station was used by an average of 113 passengers daily.

== Surrounding area ==
- former Nakaminato City Hall

== See also ==
- List of railway stations in Japan
