= Kōkimae Station =

Railway station in Hitachinaka, Ibaraki Prefecture, Japan

Kōkimae Station 工機前駅
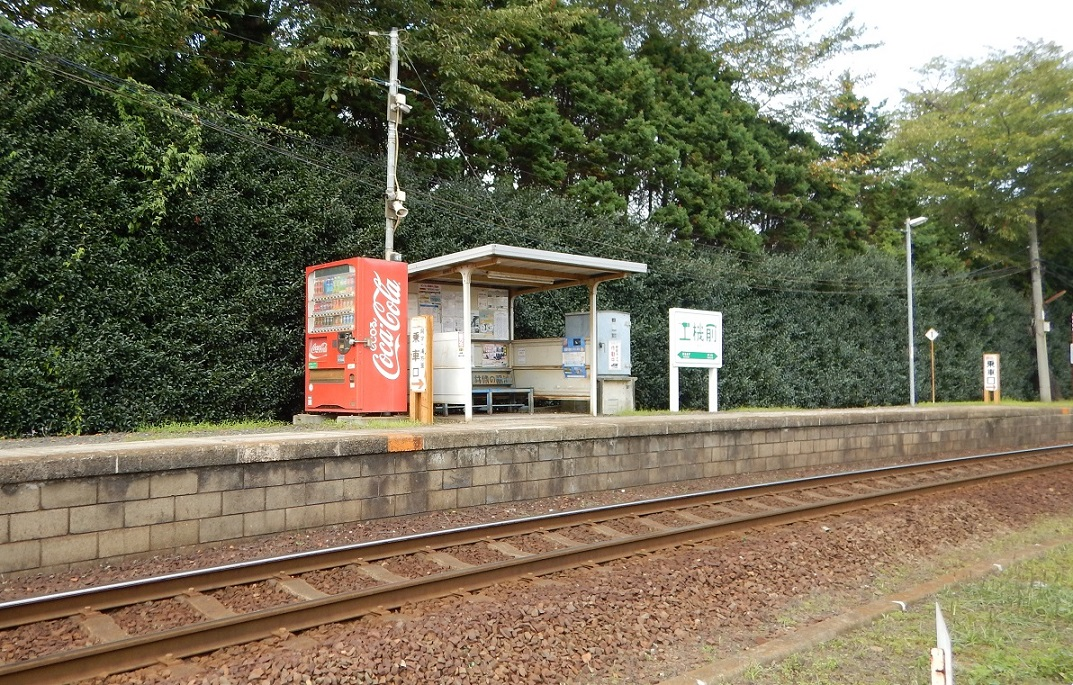
- Platform of Kōkimae Station in October 2019

General information
- Location: Odaira 4-chōme, Hitachinaka-shi, Ibaraki-ken 312-0023; Japan
- Coordinates: 36.3879°N 140.5247°E
- Operator: Hitachinaka Seaside Railway
- Line: ■ Minato Line
- Distance: 0.6 km from Katsuta
- Platforms: 1 (1 side platform)
- Tracks: 1

Construction
- Structure type: At-grade

Other information
- Status: Unstaffed
- Website: Official website

History
- Opened: 28 November 1961
- Former names: Nikkō-mae (to 2019)

Passengers
- FY2011: 9 daily

Services
Preceding station	Hitachinaka Seaside Railway	Following station
Katsuta Terminus	Minato Line	Kaneage towards Ajigaura
Location
- Location within Ibaraki Prefecture Location within Japan

Kōkimae Station (工機前駅, Kōkimae-eki) is a passenger railway station on the Minato Line in the city of Hitachinaka, Ibaraki, Japan, operated by the third-sector railway operator Hitachinaka Seaside Railway.

== Lines ==
Kōkimae Station is served by the 14.3 km single-track Hitachinaka Seaside Railway Minato Line from Katsuta to Ajigaura, and lies 0.6 km from the starting point of the line at Katsuta.

== Station layout ==
The station is unstaffed and consists of a single side platform with a simple passenger waiting shelter. There is no station building.

== History ==
The station opened on 28 November 1961 with the name Nikkō-mae Station (日工前駅, Nikkōmae-eki). On 1 October 2019, it was renamed to its current name.

== Passenger statistics ==
In fiscal 2011, the station was used by an average of 9 passengers daily.

== Surrounding area ==
- Koki Holdings Co., Ltd. Katsuta factory

== See also ==
- List of railway stations in Japan
