= Hiraiso Station =

Railway station in Hitachinaka, Ibaraki Prefecture, Japan

Hiraiso Station 平磯駅
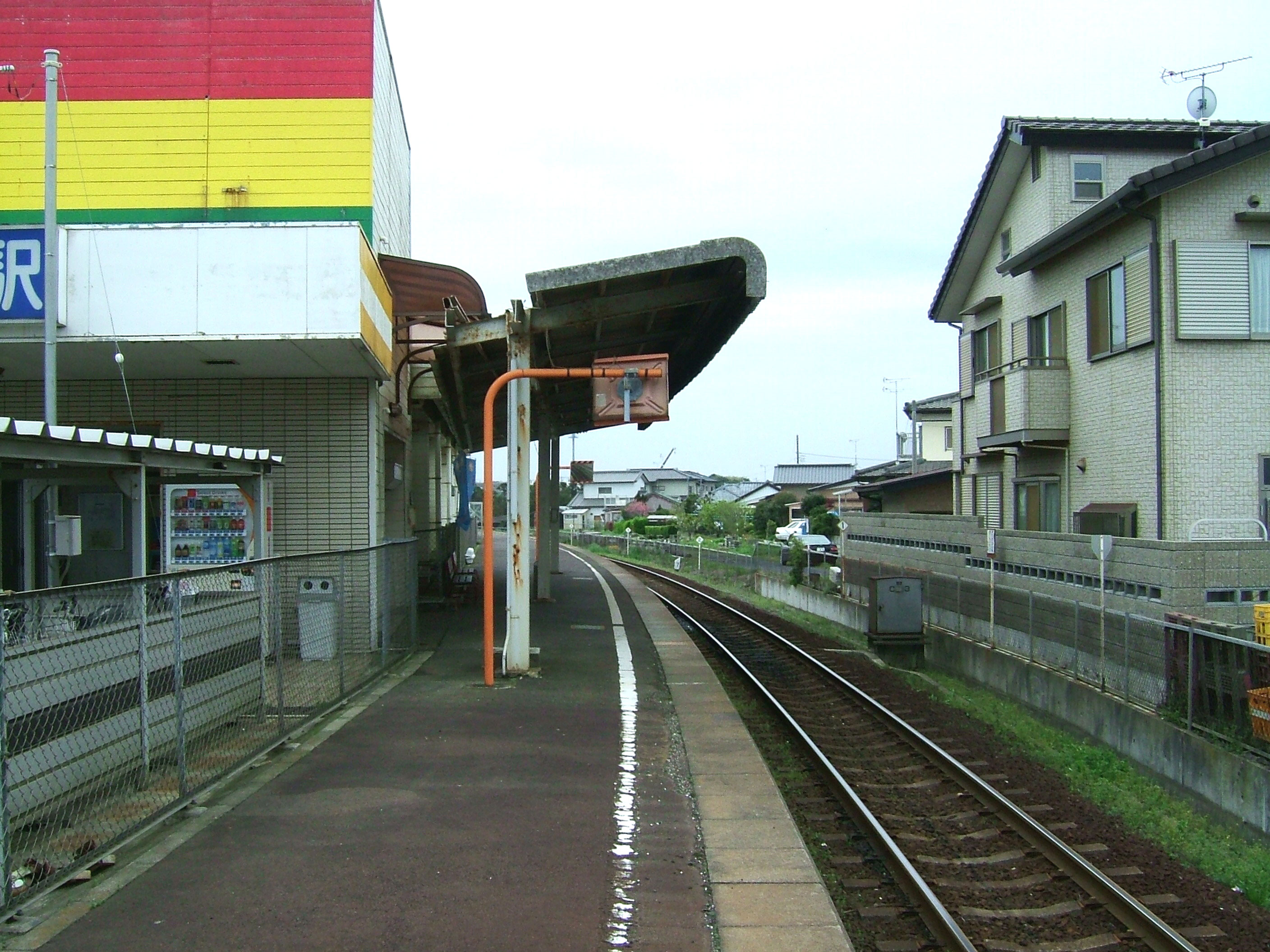
- Hiraiso Station, April 2008

General information
- Location: Hiraisocho, Hitachinaka-shi, Ibaraki-ken 311-1203; Japan
- Coordinates: 36.3574°N 140.6077°E
- Operator: Hitachinaka Seaside Railway
- Line: ■ Minato Line
- Distance: 10.8 km from Katsuta
- Platforms: 1 (1 side platform)
- Tracks: 1

Other information
- Status: Unstaffed
- Website: Official website

History
- Opened: 3 September 1924

Passengers
- FY2011: 144 daily

Services
Preceding station	Hitachinaka Seaside Railway	Following station
Tonoyama towards Katsuta	Minato Line	Minohamagakuen towards Ajigaura
Location
- Location within Ibaraki Prefecture Location within Japan

Hiraiso Station (平磯駅, Hiraiso-eki) is a passenger railway station on the Minato Line in the city of Hitachinaka, Ibaraki, Japan, operated by the third-sector railway operator Hitachinaka Seaside Railway.

== Lines ==
Hiraiso Station is served by the 14.3 km single-track Hitachinaka Seaside Railway Minato Line from Katsuta to Ajigaura, and lies 10.8 km from the starting point of the line at Katsuta.

== Station layout ==
The station has a single side platform serving traffic in both directions. The station building is a portion of a local supermarket. The station was modernized in 2011 with toilets and wheelchair accessibility.

== History ==
Hiraiso Station opened on 3 September 1924 as a station on the Minato Railway.

== Passenger statistics ==
In fiscal 2011, the station was used by an average of 144 passengers daily.

== Surrounding area ==
- Hiraiso Post Office
- Hiraiso swimming beach

== See also ==
- List of railway stations in Japan
