= Hitachinaka Baseball Stadium =

Stadium in Hitachinaka, Japan

Coordinates: 36°23′31.71″N 140°35′2.78″E

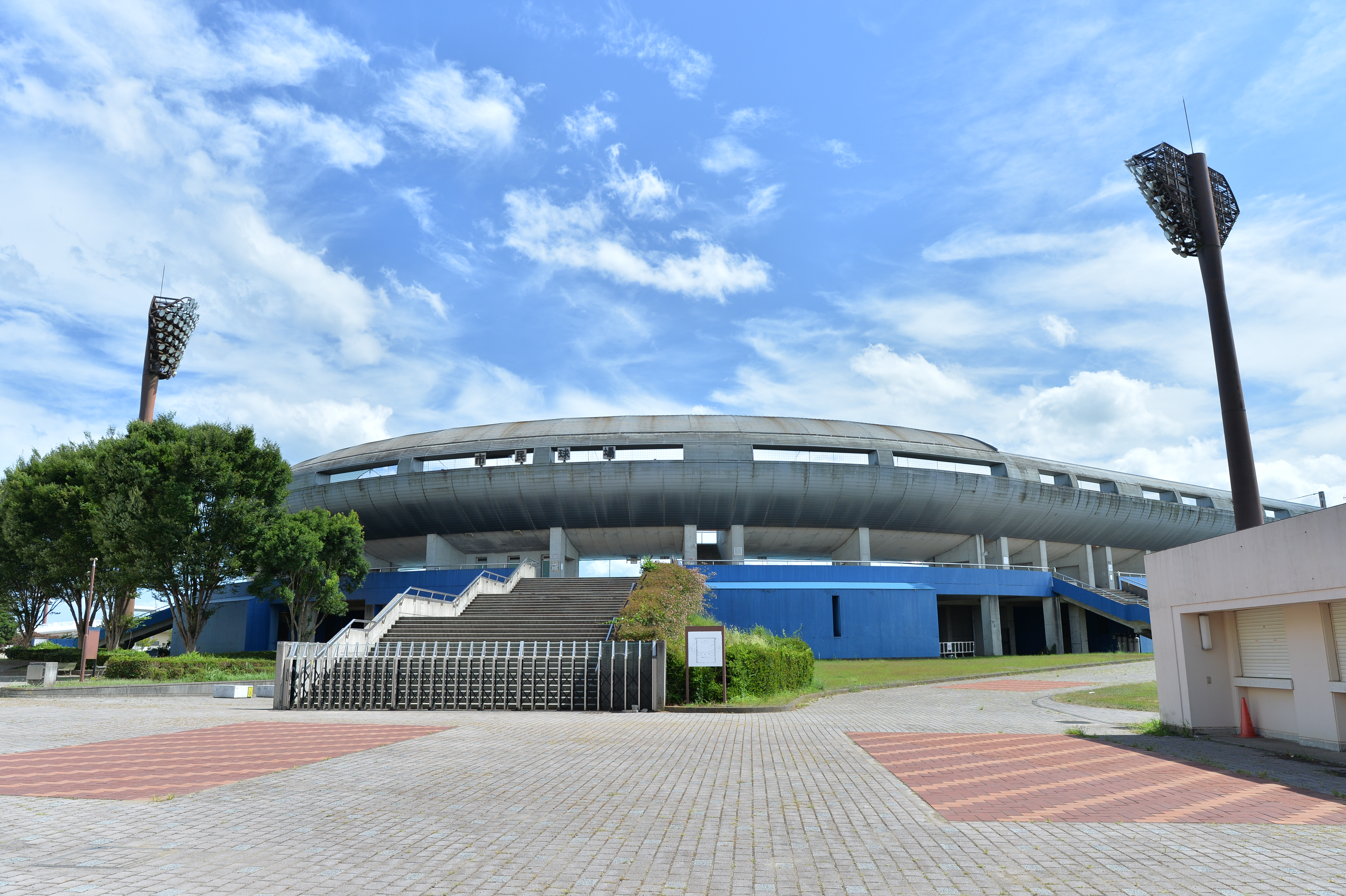
- Interactive map of Hitachinaka Baseball Stadium
- Location: Hitachinaka, Ibaraki, Japan
- Owner: Hitachinaka City
- Operator: Hitachinaka City
- Capacity: 25,000
- Surface: grass

Construction
- Opened: 1990

Hitachinaka Baseball Stadium (ひたちなか市民球場, Hitachinaka Shimin Kyujo) is a baseball stadium in Hitachinaka, Ibaraki Prefecture, Japan. The stadium has an all-seated capacity of 25,000.
