= Minato Line =

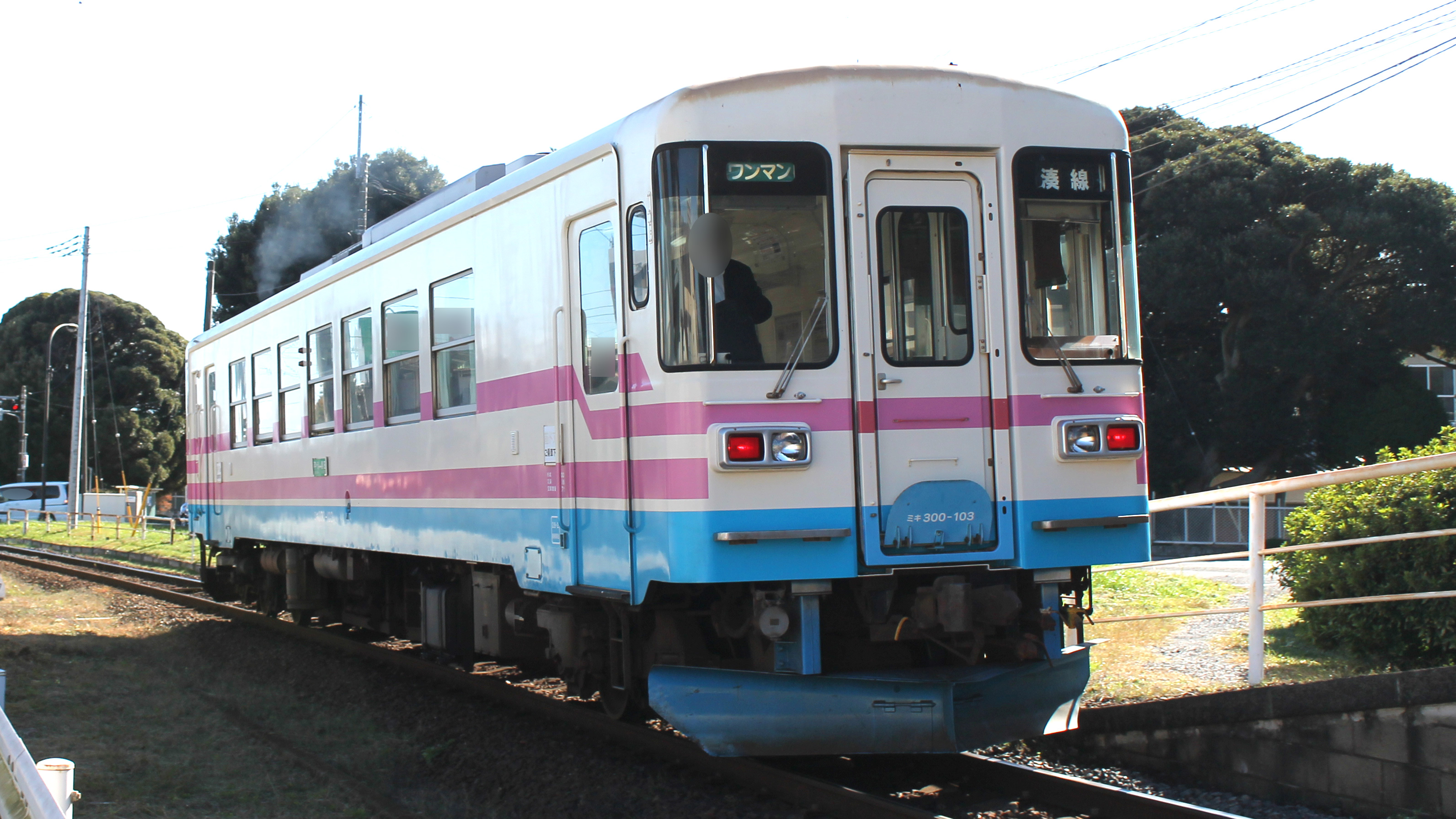
- A Miki300-103 diesel railcar on the line in November 2021

Overview
- Native name: 湊線
- Status: In operation
- Owner: Hitachinaka Seaside Railway
- Locale: Ibaraki Prefecture
- Termini: Katsuta; Ajigaura
- Stations: 11
- Website: http://www.hitachinaka-rail.co.jp/

Service
- Operator: Hitachinaka Seaside Railway
- Depot: Nakaminato
- Rolling stock: KiHa 11 series, KiHa 20 series, KiHa 37 series, MiKi 300 series DMU

History
- Opened: 1913

Technical
- Line length: 14.3 km (8.9 mi)
- Number of tracks: Single
- Character: Rural
- Track gauge: 1,067 mm (3 ft 6 in)
- Minimum radius: 200 m
- Electrification: None
- Operating speed: 60 km/h (37 mph)

The Minato Line (湊線, Minato-sen) is a 14.3 km Japanese railway line operated by the third-sector railway operator Hitachinaka Seaside Railway (ひたちなか海浜鉄道, Hitachinaka Kaihin Tetsudō) between Katsuta and Ajigaura, all within Hitachinaka, Ibaraki Prefecture. It is the only railway line operated by the company. The line was formerly operated by Ibaraki Kōtsū until 2008, which continues to partially own the company along with the City of Hitachinaka.

== History ==
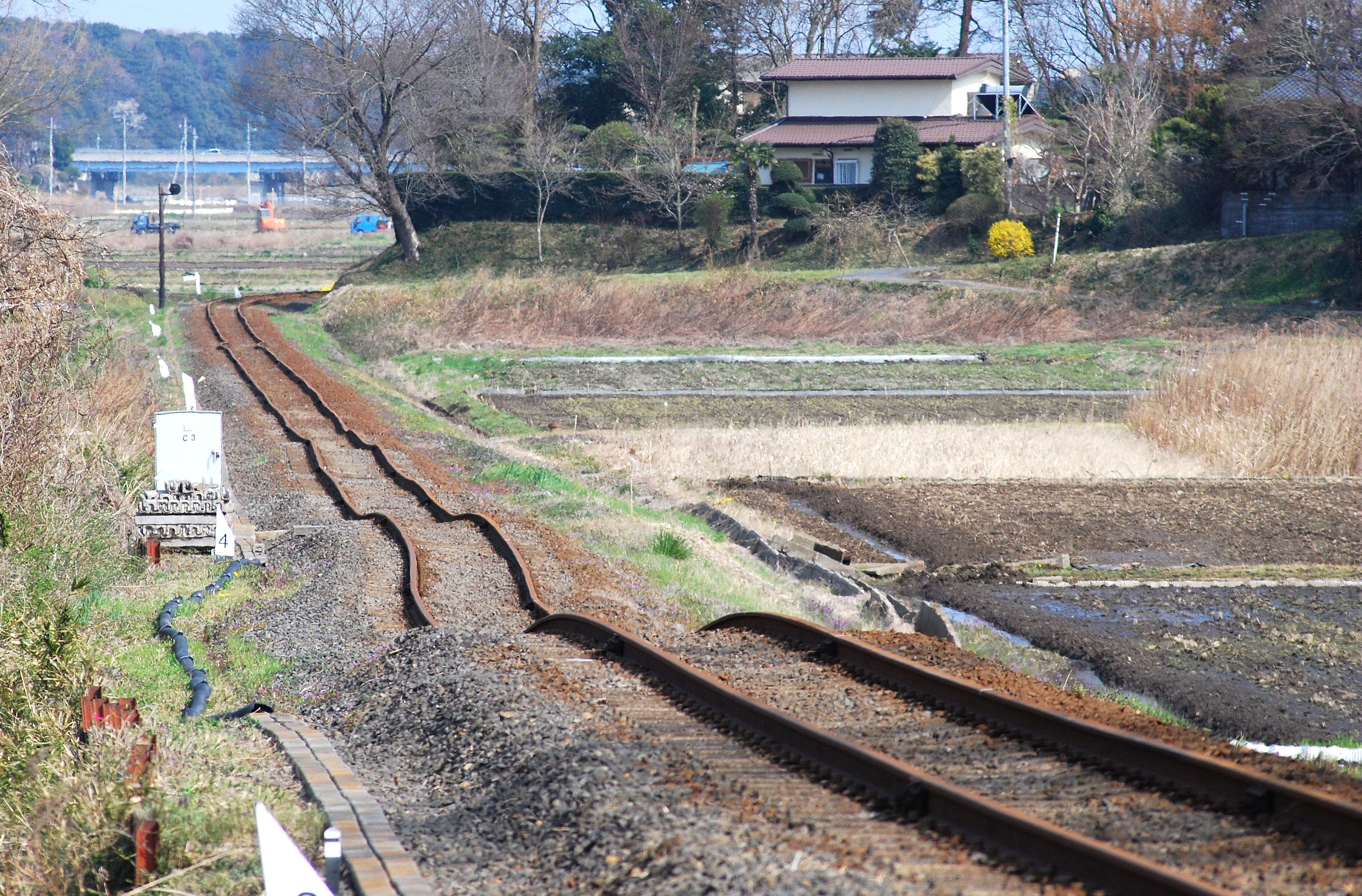
Trackbed damaged by the March 2011 Great East Japan earthquake

The Minato Railway (湊鉄道, Minato Tetsudō) was established on 18 November 1907, and the line was opened from Katsuta to Nakaminato on 25 December 1913, using steam haulage. The entire line to Ajigaura was completed on 17 July 1928. From 1 August 1944, the line was taken over by Ibaraki Kōtsū (茨城交通), becoming the Ibaraki Kōtsū Minato Line.

The Minato Line was the only railway line operated by Ibaraki Kōtsū, whose main business was bus transport. Because of its severe financial situation, Ibaraki Kōtsū decided to withdraw from railway operation. In September 2007, Ibaraki Kōtsū and the city of Hitachinaka agreed to transfer the line to a third-sector (funded jointly by local government and private sector) company, later incorporated as Hitachinaka Seaside Railway. From 1 April 2008, the line became the Hitachinaka Seaside Railway Minato Line.

From 6 April 2010, all train services became one-man operation.

The line was damaged by the 11 March 2011 Great East Japan earthquake, but the entire line was reopened for business from 23 July of the same year. The line is planned to be extended north by 3.1 kilometres (1.9 mi) in the future. The two stations will be near the southern gate and the western gate of the Hitachi Seaside Park. As of 2025, these stations are assigned tentative names New Station 1 and New Station 2.

== Operations ==
Train services are normally formed of single-car diesel units, increased to two-car formations during the morning peak.

== Infrastructure ==
As of 1 April 2016, the railway operates a fleet of eight single-car diesel railcars, as follows.

- KiHa 11 x3 (car numbers KiHa 11-5 to 7, since 30 December 2015)
- KiHa 20 x1 (car number 205, former Mizushima Rinkai Railway KiHa 20, same as JNR KiHa 20)
- MiKi 300 x1 (car number 300-103, former Miki Railway MiKi 300)
- KiHa 3710 x2 (car numbers 3710-01 and 3710-02)
- KiHa 37100 x1 (car number 37100-03)

In April 2015, three former JR Central KiHa 11 diesel cars, KiHa 11-123/203/204, were sold to the Hitachinaka Kaihin Railway, becoming KiHa 11-5, Kiha 11-6, and KiHa 11-7 respectively. Two more KiHa 11-200 series cars, formerly owned by Tokai Transport Service Company (TKJ) in Aichi Prefecture, were purchased by the Hitachinaka Kaihin Railway in 2015 and 2016. Of these, KiHa 11-201 was moved by road to the Hitachinaka Kaihin Railway in September 2015, and Kiha 11-202 was moved in March 2016.

=== Future Rolling Stock ===
- KiHa 110 series x3

One of them is scheduled to be converted to a sightseeing train.

=== Former rolling stock ===
- KiHa 22 x1 (car number 222, former Haboro Mining Railway KiHa 22, same as JNR KiHa 22)
- KiHa 2000 x2 (car numbers 2004 and 2005, former Rumoi Railway KiHa 2000, same as JNR KiHa 22)

KiHa 2004 was withdrawn from service in December 2015, and sold to the Heisei Chikuhō Railway in Kyushu in 2016.

=== Stations ===
Name		Between (km)	Distance (km)	Connections	Location
Katsuta	勝田	-	0.0	Jōban Line	Hitachinaka, Ibaraki
Kōkimae	工機前	0.6	0.6		Hitachinaka, Ibaraki
Kaneage	金上	1.2	1.8		Hitachinaka, Ibaraki
Nakane	中根	3.0	4.8		Hitachinaka, Ibaraki
Takadano-tekkyō	高田の鉄橋	2.3	7.1		Hitachinaka, Ibaraki
Nakaminato	那珂湊	1.1	8.2		Hitachinaka, Ibaraki
Tonoyama	殿山	1.4	9.6		Hitachinaka, Ibaraki
Hiraiso	平磯	1.2	10.8		Hitachinaka, Ibaraki
Minohamagakuen	美乃浜学園	1.8	12.6		Hitachinaka, Ibaraki
Isozaki	磯崎	0.7	13.3		Hitachinaka, Ibaraki
Ajigaura	阿字ヶ浦	1.0	14.3		Hitachinaka, Ibaraki
TBA	TBA	1.4	15.7		Hitachinaka, Ibaraki
TBA	TBA	1.7	17.4		Hitachinaka, Ibaraki

== See also ==
- List of railway companies in Japan
- List of railway lines in Japan
- Michinori Holdings (This firm invests this railway company through Ibaraki Kotsu)
