= Hitachinaka =

Hitachinaka ひたちなか市
- City
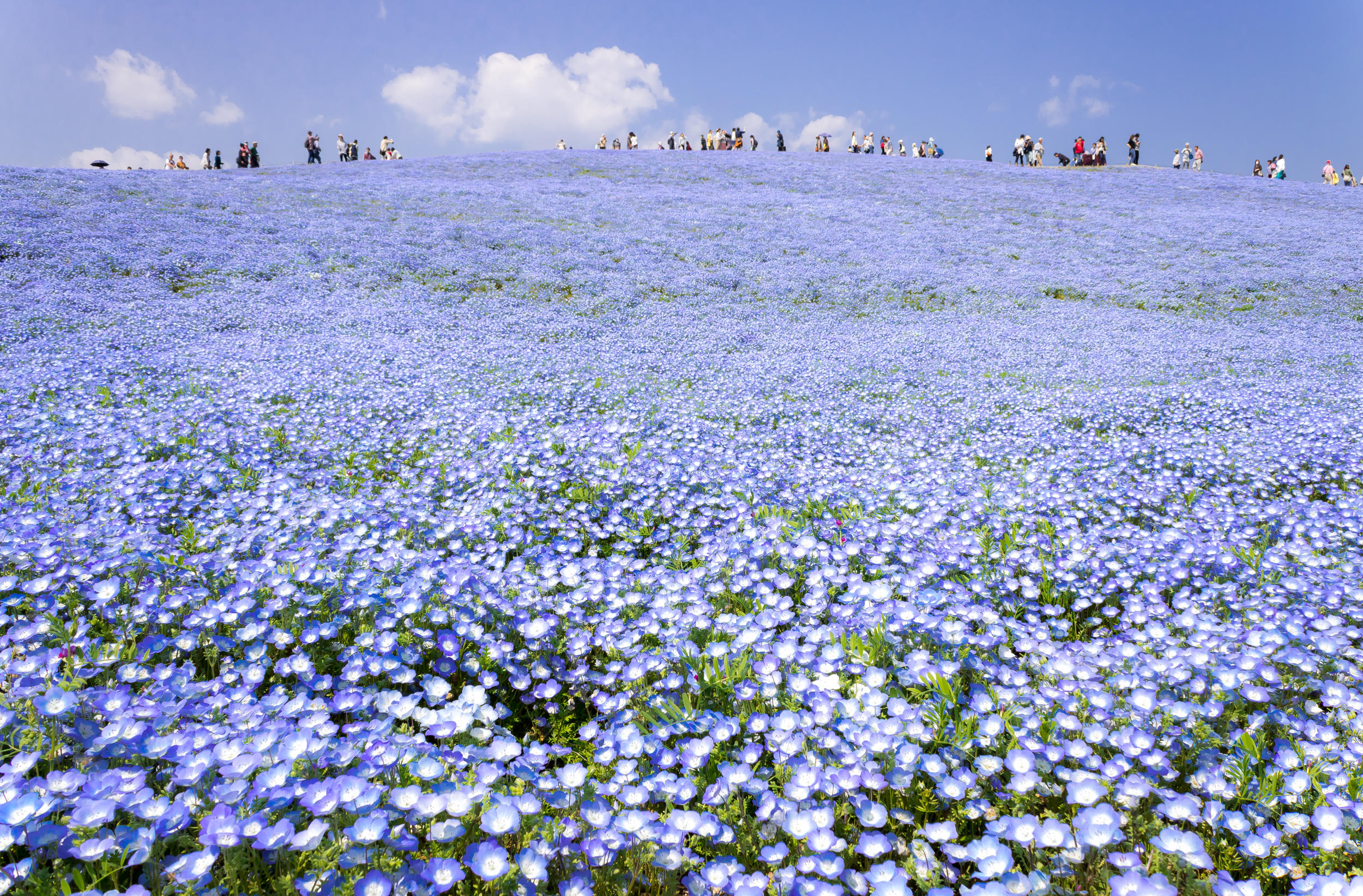
- Hitachi Seaside Park

- Flag Seal

- Location of Hitachinaka in Ibaraki Prefecture

- Coordinates: 36°23′48.1″N 140°32′4.8″E
- Country: Japan
- Region: Kantō
- Prefecture: Ibaraki
- First official recorded: late 5th century AD (official)
- Nakaminato city settled: March 31, 1954
- Katsuta city settled: November 1, 1954
- Two cities merged and current city name changed: November 1, 1994

Government
  - Mayor: Akira Ōtani (from November 2018)

Area
  - Total: 99.96 km^{2} (38.59 sq mi)

Population (October 1, 2020)
  - Total: 154,631
  - Density: 1,547/km^{2} (4,007/sq mi)
- Time zone: UTC+9 (Japan Standard Time)
- Tree: Ginkgo biloba
- Flower: Hamagiku (Chrysanthemum nipponicum)
- Bird: Japanese bush warbler
- Phone number: 029-273-0111
- Address: 2-10-1 Higashiishikawa, Hitachinaka-shi, Ibaraki-ken 312-8501
- Website: Official website

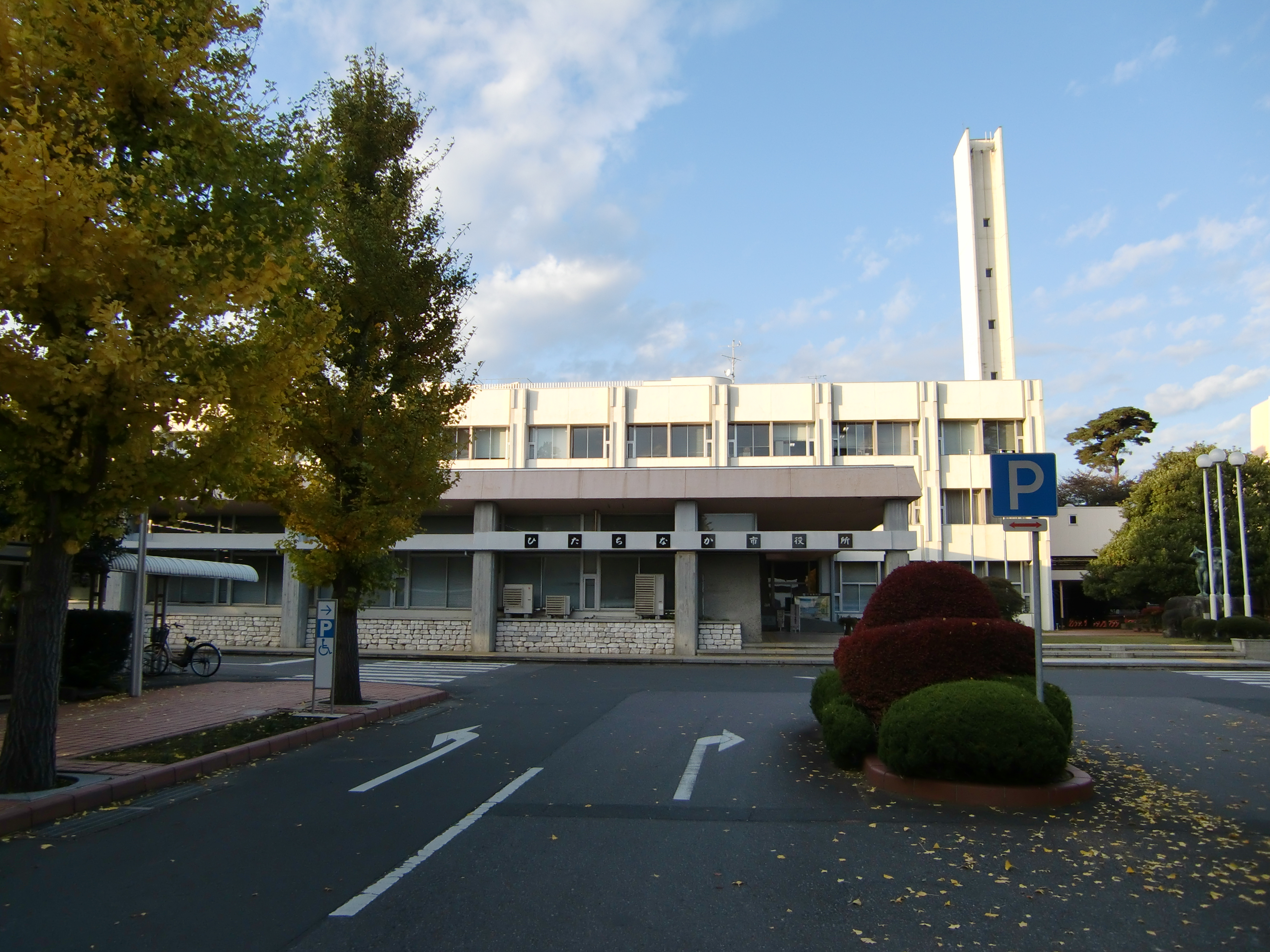
Hitachinaka city hall

Hitachinaka (ひたちなか市, Hitachinaka-shi) is a city located in Ibaraki Prefecture, Japan. As of 1 July 2020, the city had an estimated population of 154,663 in 64,900 households and a population density of 1547 persons per km^{2}. The percentage of the population aged over 65 was 26.1%. The total area of the city is 99.96 square kilometres (38.59 sq mi). It is a "hiragana city", the place name is written with the hiragana syllabary and not the traditional kanji.

== Geography ==
Hitachinaka is located slightly northeast of central Ibaraki Prefecture and east of the capital of Mito. It consists of a lowland area around the Naka River in the south and the Pacific coast in the east.

=== Surrounding municipalities ===
Ibaraki Prefecture

- Mito
- Naka
- Ōarai
- Tōkai

=== Climate ===
Hitachinaka has a humid subtropical climate (Köppen Cfa) characterized by warm summers and cold winters with light snowfall. The average annual temperature in Hitachinaka is 13.8 °C. The average annual rainfall is 1415 mm with September as the wettest month. The temperatures are highest on average in August, at around 25.2 °C, and lowest in January, at around 3.4 °C.

== Demographics ==
Per Japanese census data, the population of Hitachinaka has recently plateaued after a long period of growth.

Historical population
| Year | Pop. | ±% |
|---|---|---|
| 1920 | 36,370 | — |
| 1930 | 41,129 | +13.1% |
| 1940 | 45,729 | +11.2% |
| 1950 | 68,705 | +50.2% |
| 1960 | 77,808 | +13.2% |
| 1970 | 99,627 | +28.0% |
| 1980 | 125,945 | +26.4% |
| 1990 | 142,402 | +13.1% |
| 2000 | 151,673 | +6.5% |
| 2010 | 157,060 | +3.6% |
| 2020 | 156,581 | −0.3% |

== History ==
The towns of Hiraiso and Minato, as well as the village of Katsuta, were created within Naka District with the establishment of the modern municipalities system on April 1, 1889. Minato was renamed Nakaminato in 1938. Nakaminato had the commercial fishing industry as its main industry, but the area rapidly developed into a company town of Hitachi, Katsuta was elevated to town status in 1940. During World War II, the area was subject to air raids and shelling by Allied warships due to its numerous factories producing war-related materials. On March 31, 1954, the towns of Nakaminato and Hiraiso merged, forming the city of Nakaminato. Katsuta was raised to city status on November 1 of the same year. The two cities merged on November 1, 1994, to form the city of Hitachinaka.

== Government ==
Hitachinaka has a mayor-council form of government with a directly elected mayor and a unicameral city council of 25 members. Hitachinaka contributes three members to the Ibaraki Prefectural Assembly. In terms of national politics, the city is part of Ibaraki's 4th district of the lower house of the Diet of Japan.

== Economy ==
Hitachinaka is a bustling city with a diverse economy. The city's strategic location near Tokyo and its access to major transportation hubs have made it a popular destination for businesses and investors. It developed primarily as a company town for Hitachi group factories, and Hitachi remains the primary employer. Secondary industries include commercial fishing, agriculture and seasonal tourism.

== Education ==
Hitachinaka has 20 public elementary schools and nine public middle schools operated by the city government, and five public high schools operated by the Ibaraki Prefectural Board of Education, including Katsuta High School. The prefecture also operates one technical institute and one special education school for the handicapped.

== Transportation ==
=== Railway ===
Hitachinaka is connected through the Katsuta Station to the railway network with direct connections to Tokyo and Iwaki.

JR East - Tokiwa Line

JR East –Jōban Line

- Katsuta – Sawa

JR East – Suigun Line

- Hitachi-Aoyagi – Hitachi-Tsuda

Hitachinaka Seaside Railway – Minato Line

- Katsuta – Kōkimae – Kaneage – Nakane – Takadano-tekkyō – Nakaminato – Tonoyama – Hiraiso – Minohamagakuen – Isozaki – Ajigaura

=== Highway ===
- National Route 6
- National Route 245
- Hitachinaka Road
- Higashi-Mito Road

== Local attractions ==
- Ajigaura Swimming Beach
- Hiraiso Swimming Beach
- Hitachi Seaside Park
- Hitachinaka Baseball Stadium
- Hitachinaka City Stadium
- Torazuka Kofun, National Historic Site

== Sister cities ==
Hitachinaka is twinned with:

- Nasushiobara, Tochigi, Japan, since 1990
- Ishinomaki, Miyagi, Japan, since 1996

== Notable people ==
- Ōuchiyama Heikichi, sumo wrestler
- Hironobu Sakaguchi, video game designer and creator of the Final Fantasy series
- Kentaro Shiga, a professional wrestler
- Natsuo Yamaguchi, a politician
