= Hitachi Seaside Park =

Public park in Hitachinaka, Ibaraki, Japan

Coordinates: 36°24′02″N 140°35′29″E

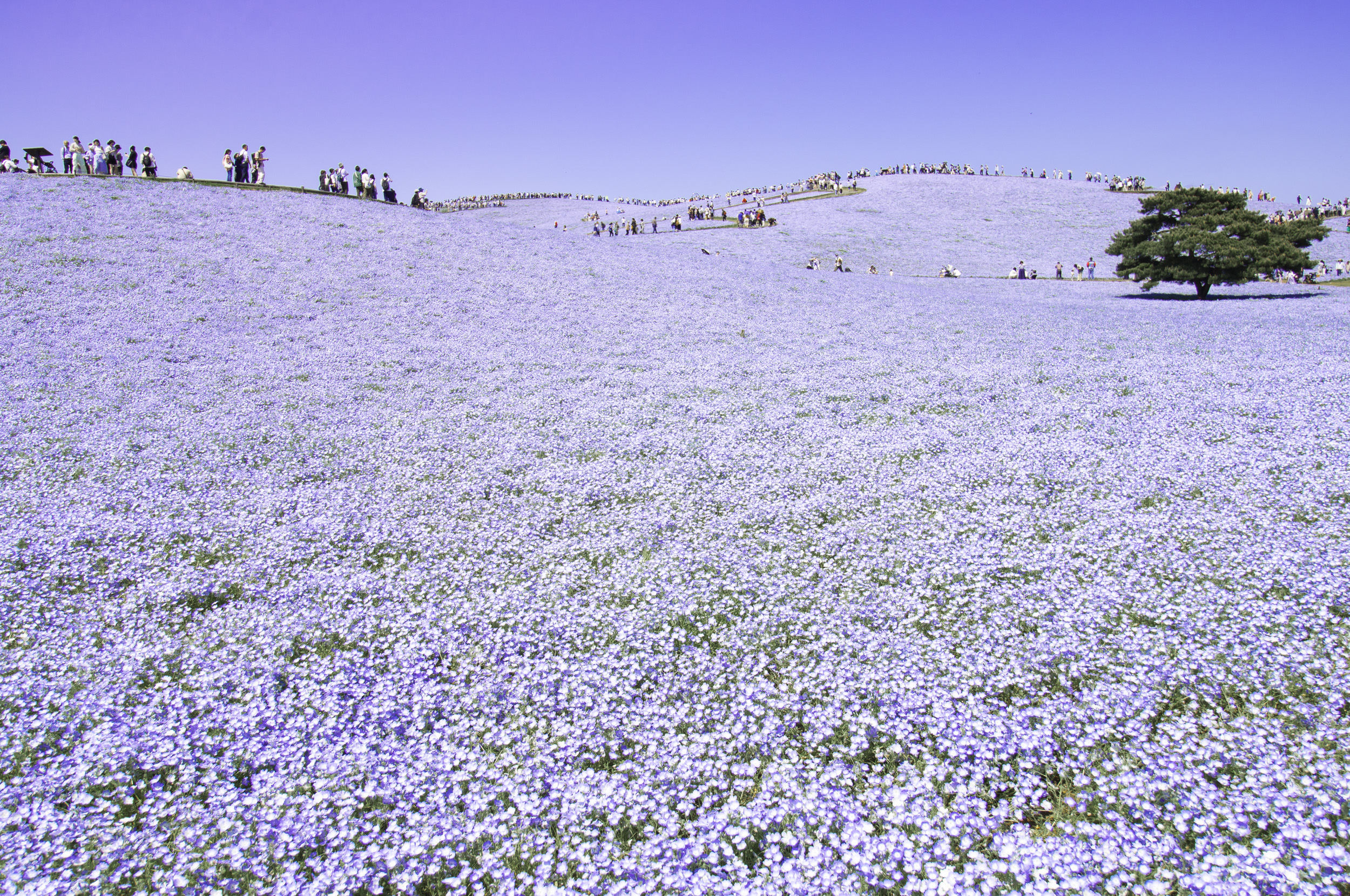
- Hitachi Seaside Park in April 2025
- Interactive map of Hitachi Seaside Park
- Location: Hitachinaka, Ibaraki, Japan
- Area: 190 ha (470 acres)

Hitachi Seaside Park (国営ひたち海浜公園, Kokuei Hitachi Kaihinkōen) is a public park in Hitachinaka, Ibaraki, Japan.

== Overview ==
Covering an area of 190 hectares, the park features blooming flowers around the year. The park has become known for its baby blue-eyes flowers, with the blooming of 4.5 million of the translucent-petaled blue flowers in the spring drawing tourists. In addition to the annual "Nemophila Harmony", the park features a million daffodils, 170 varieties of tulips, and many other flowers. The park includes cycling trails and a small amusement park with a Ferris wheel.

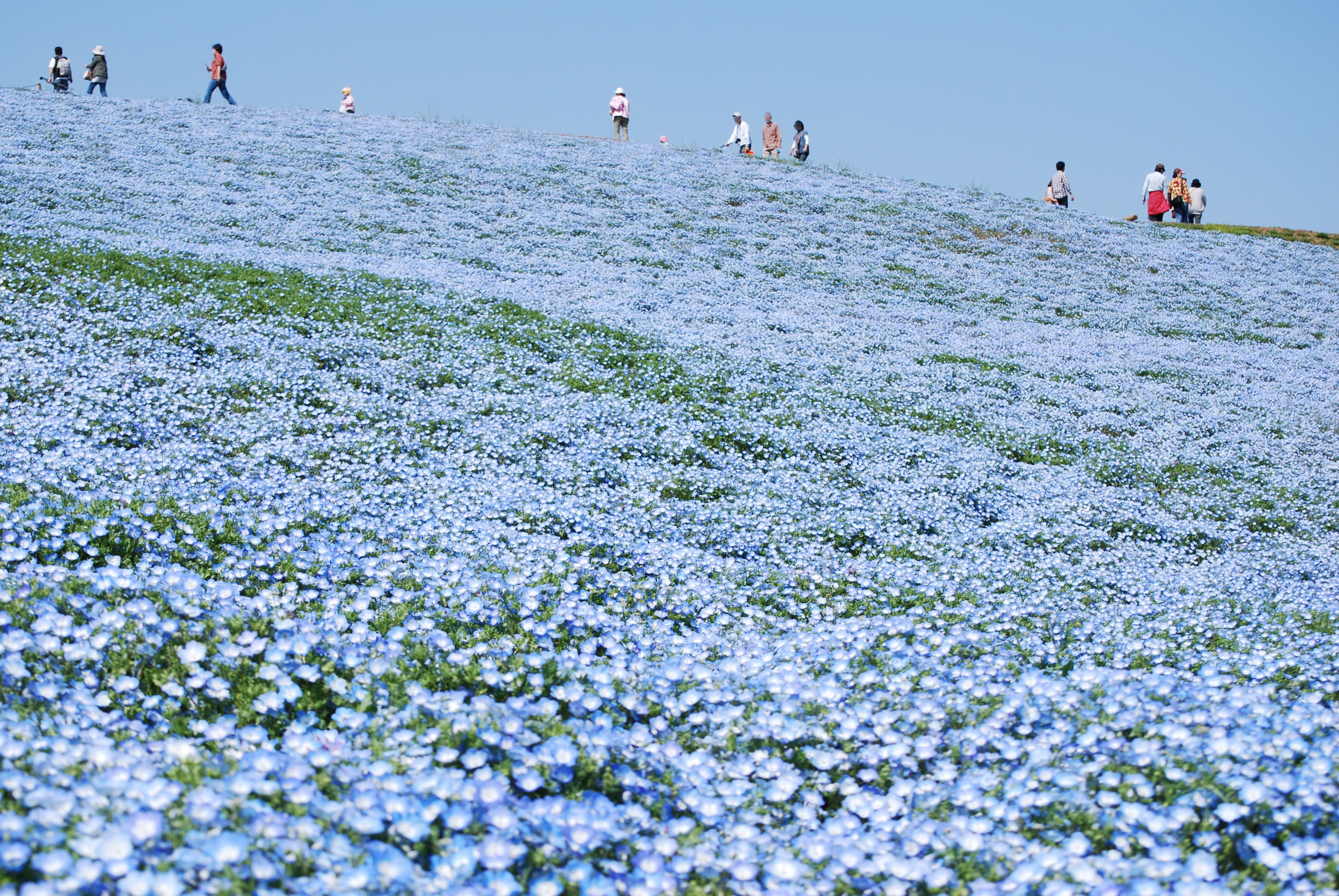
Baby blue eyes in April

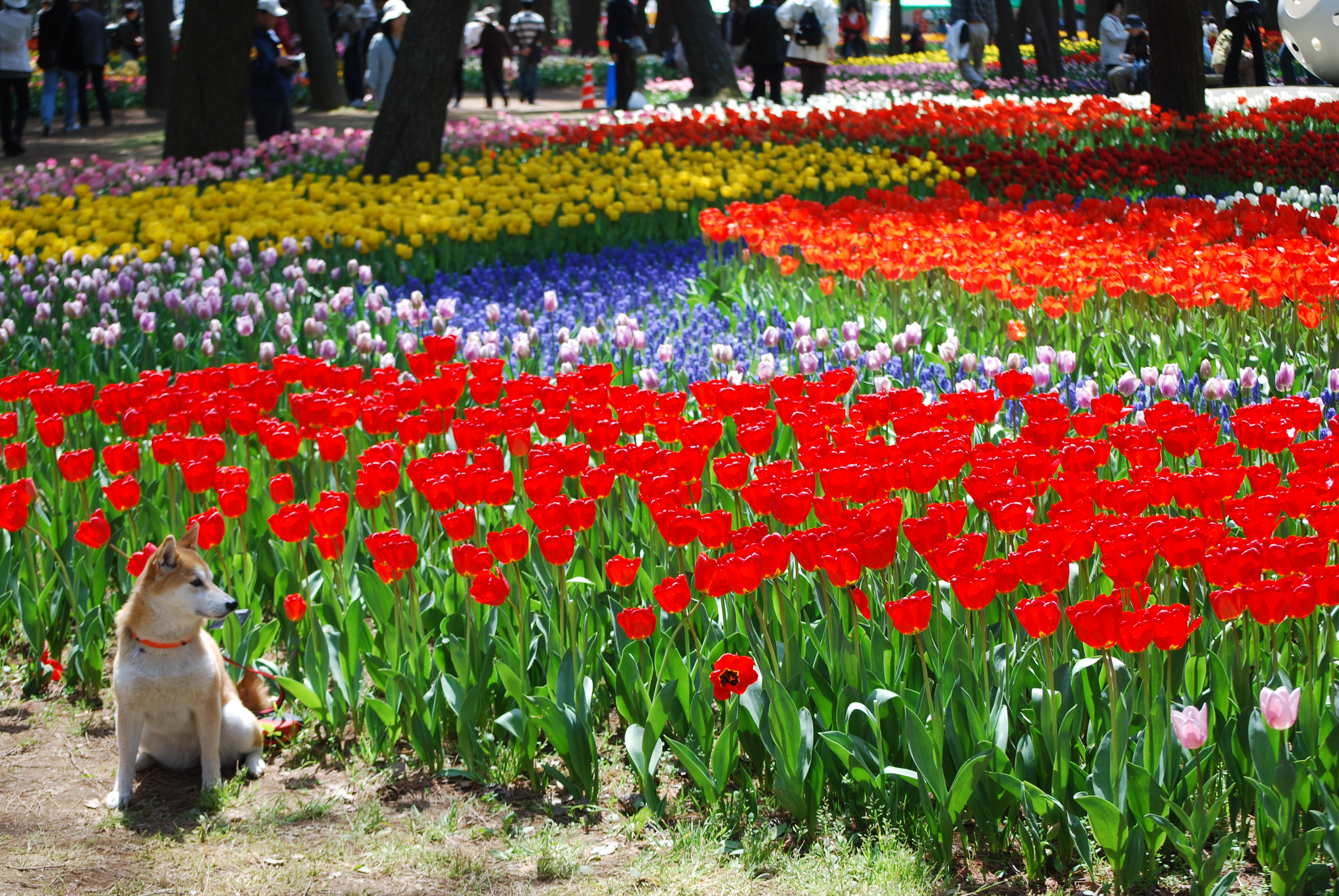
Tulips in April

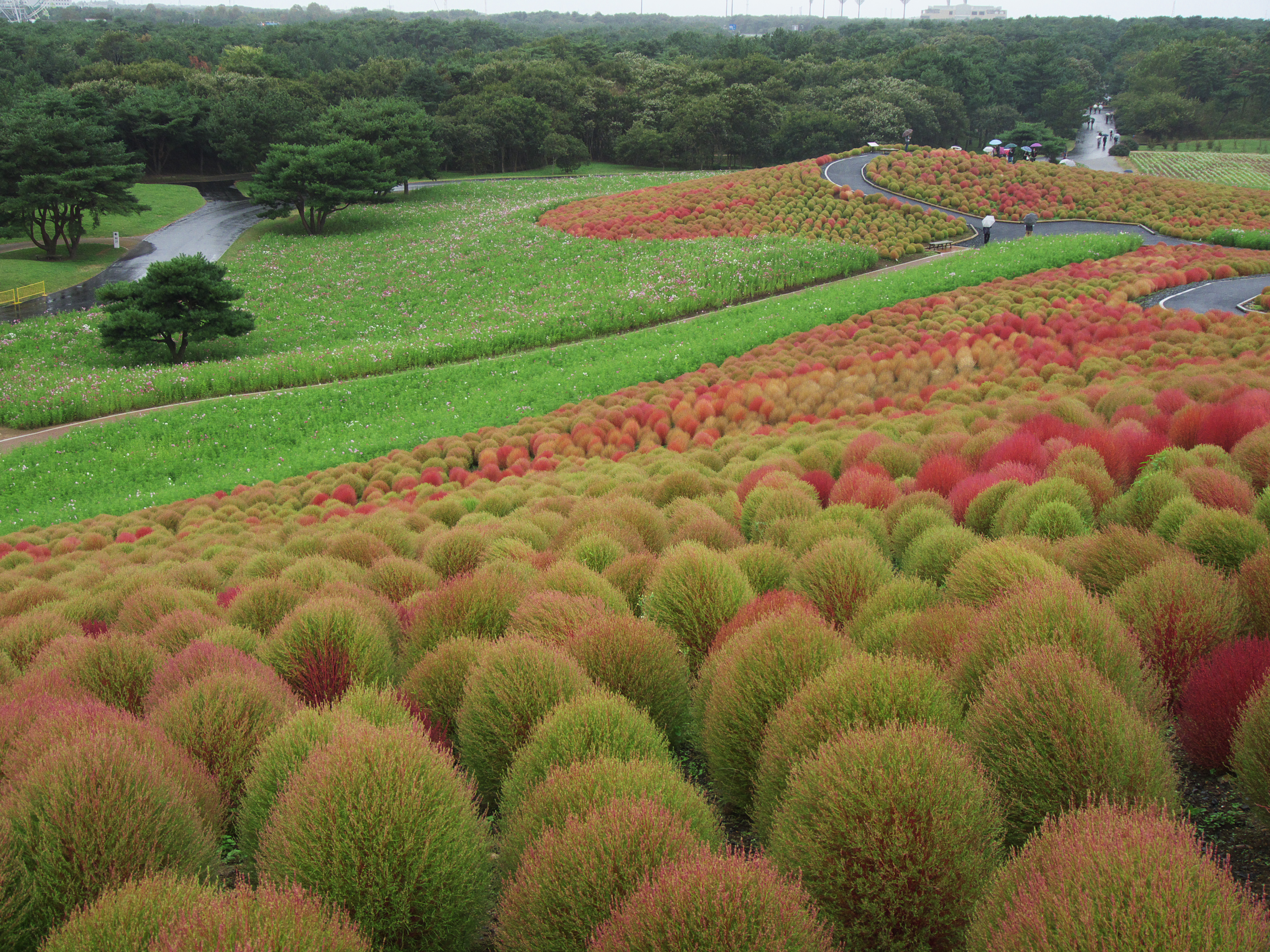
Mass planting of Bassia scoparia turning colour in Autumn.

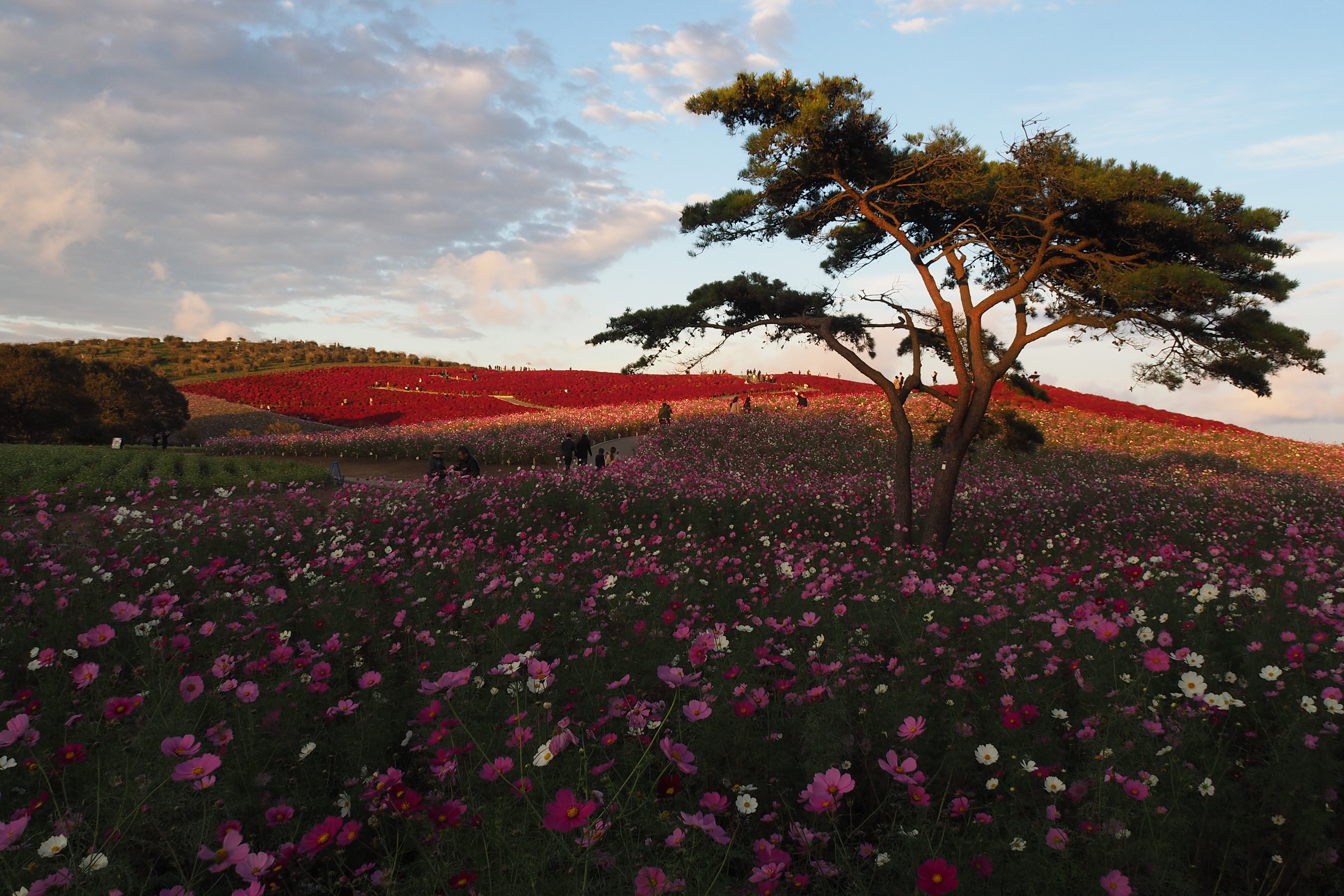
Autumn view of the park

== Events ==
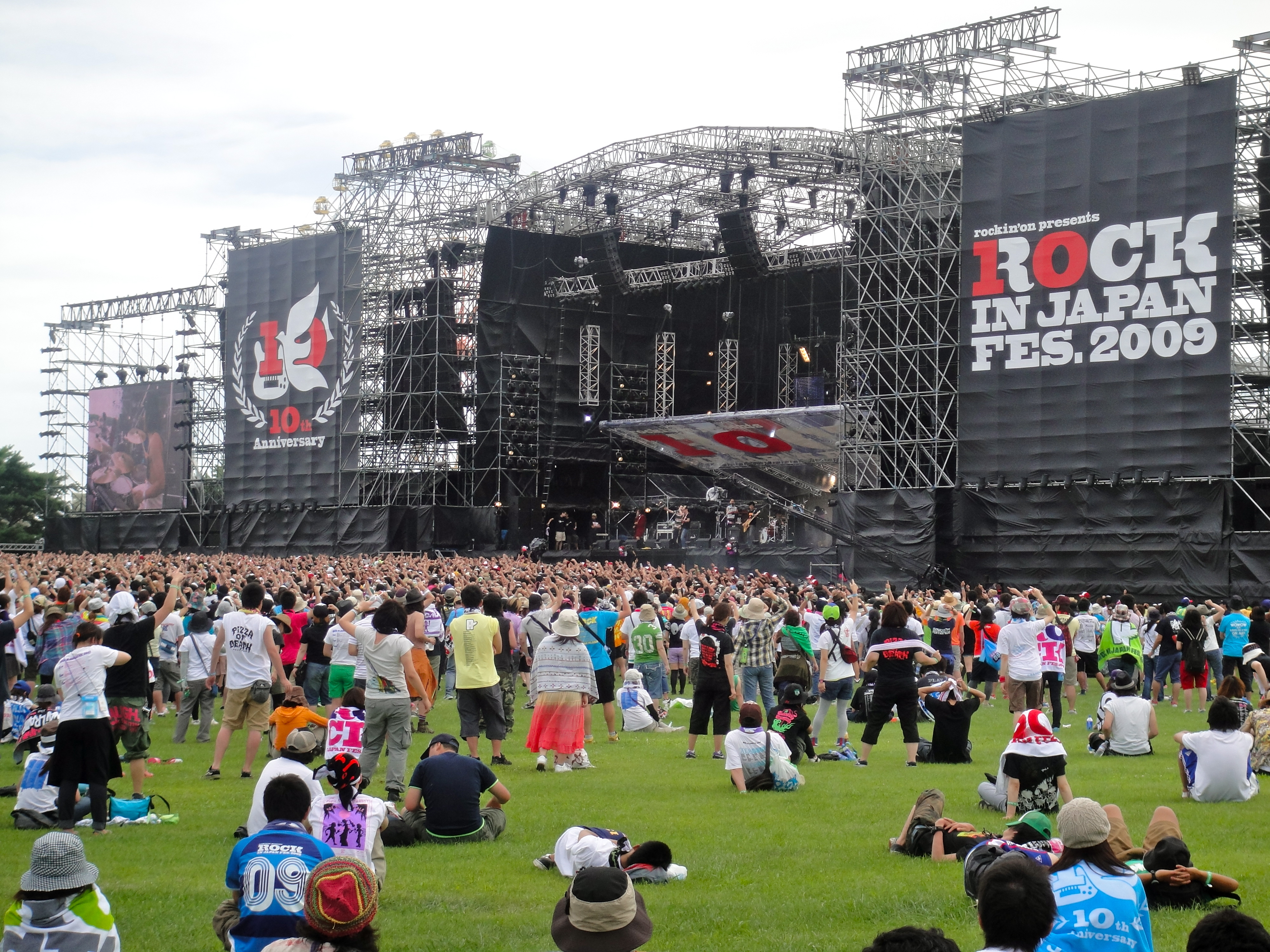
Rock in Japan Festival 2009

Hitachi Seaside Park previously hosted the Rock in Japan Festival, held in August every year.

== Access ==
The nearest railway station is Ajigaura Station on the Minato Line of the Hitachinaka Seaside Railway (via Katsuta Station on the JR Joban Line).
