= KiHa 11 =

Japanese train type

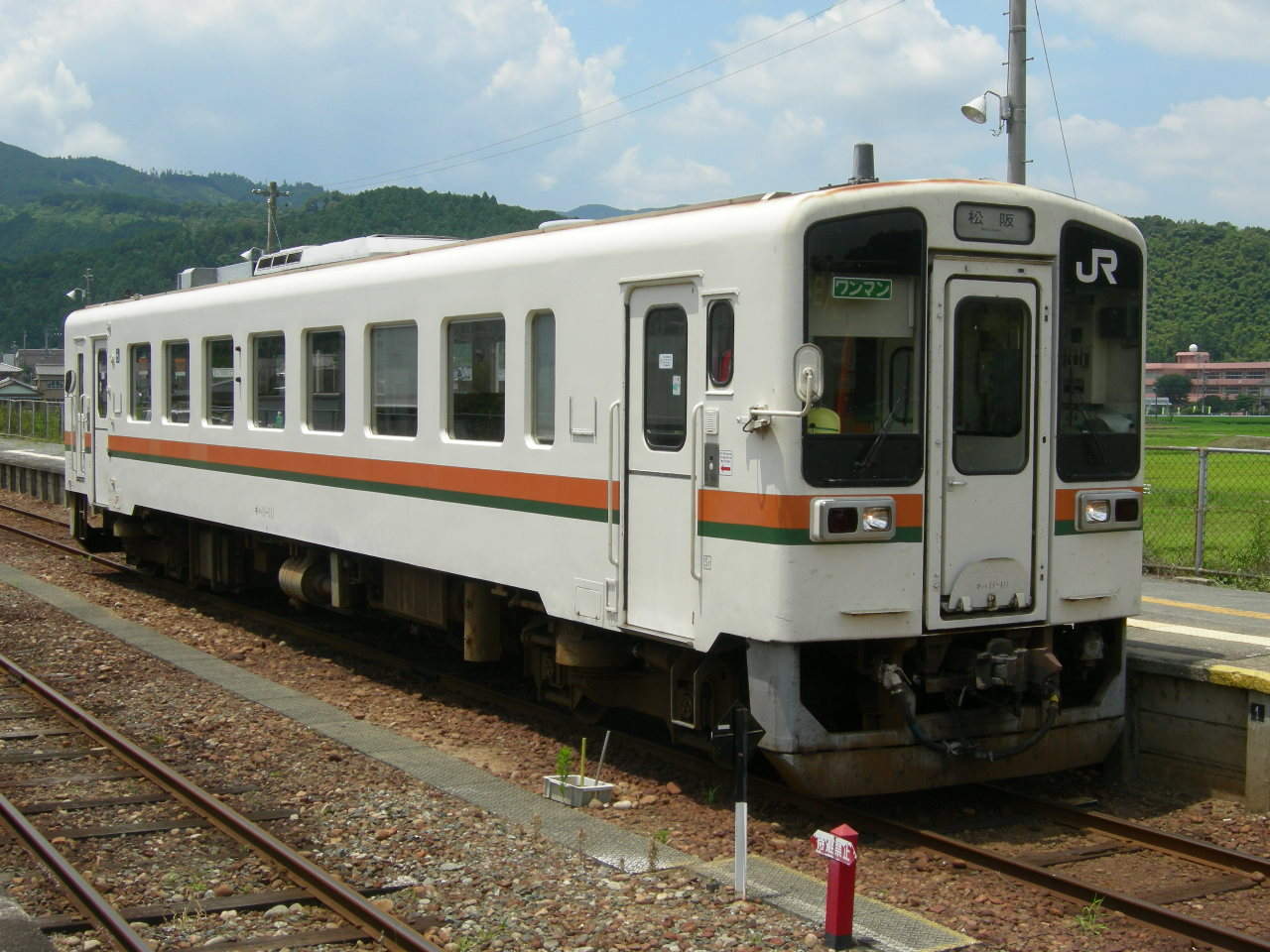
- KiHa 11-111 at Ieki Station, July 2006
- In service: 1989–present
- Manufacturers: JR Central Nagoya, Niigata Tekkō
- Replaced: KiHa 35, KiHa 58
- Constructed: 1989–1999
- Number built: 43
- Number in service: 24 (JR Central)
- Number scrapped: 1
- Formation: Single car
- Operators: JR Central (1989–present); JR-Central Transport Service Company (1993–present); Hitachinaka Kaihin Railway (2015–present); Myanmar Railways (2015–present)
- Depot: Nagoya
- Lines served: Meishō Line, Jōhoku Line, Minato Line

Specifications
- Car body construction: Steel (KiHa 11-0/100/200); Stainless steel (KiHa 11-300)
- Car length: 18 m (59 ft)
- Width: -0/100/200: 2,998 mm (9 ft 10 in) -300: 3,188 mm (10 ft 5.5 in)
- Doors: 2 sliding doors per side
- Maximum speed: 95 km/h (59 mph)
- Weight: -0/-100: 27.8 t (61,000 lb) -300: 29.5 t (65,000 lb)
- Prime mover: Cummins C-DMF14HZ
- Power output: 330 hp (250 kW)
- Transmission: Hydraulic
- Track gauge: 1,067 mm (3 ft 6 in)

The KiHa 11 (キハ11形) is a single-car diesel multiple unit (DMU) train type operated by Central Japan Railway Company (JR Central) and the JR-Central Transport Service Company (TKJ) on driver-only operated rural services in central Japan. A total of 43 cars were built between 1989 and 1999, with the class divided into four sub-classes: KiHa 11-0, KiHa 11-100, KiHa 11-200, and KiHa 11-300.

== Build details ==
The fleet build details are as follows.

Subclass	Number built	Years built	Body	Operator
KiHa 11-0	10	1989	Steel	JR Central
KiHa 11-100	23	1989	Steel	JR Central
KiHa 11-200	4	1993	Steel	TKJ/JR Central
KiHa 11-300	6	1999	Stainless steel	JR Central

== KiHa 11-0 ==
Ten KiHa 11-0 cars (KiHa 11-1–10) were delivered to Ise Depot from Niigata Tekkō (now Niigata Transys) between January and February 1989.

KiHa 11-9 was withdrawn in 2007 due to accident damage.

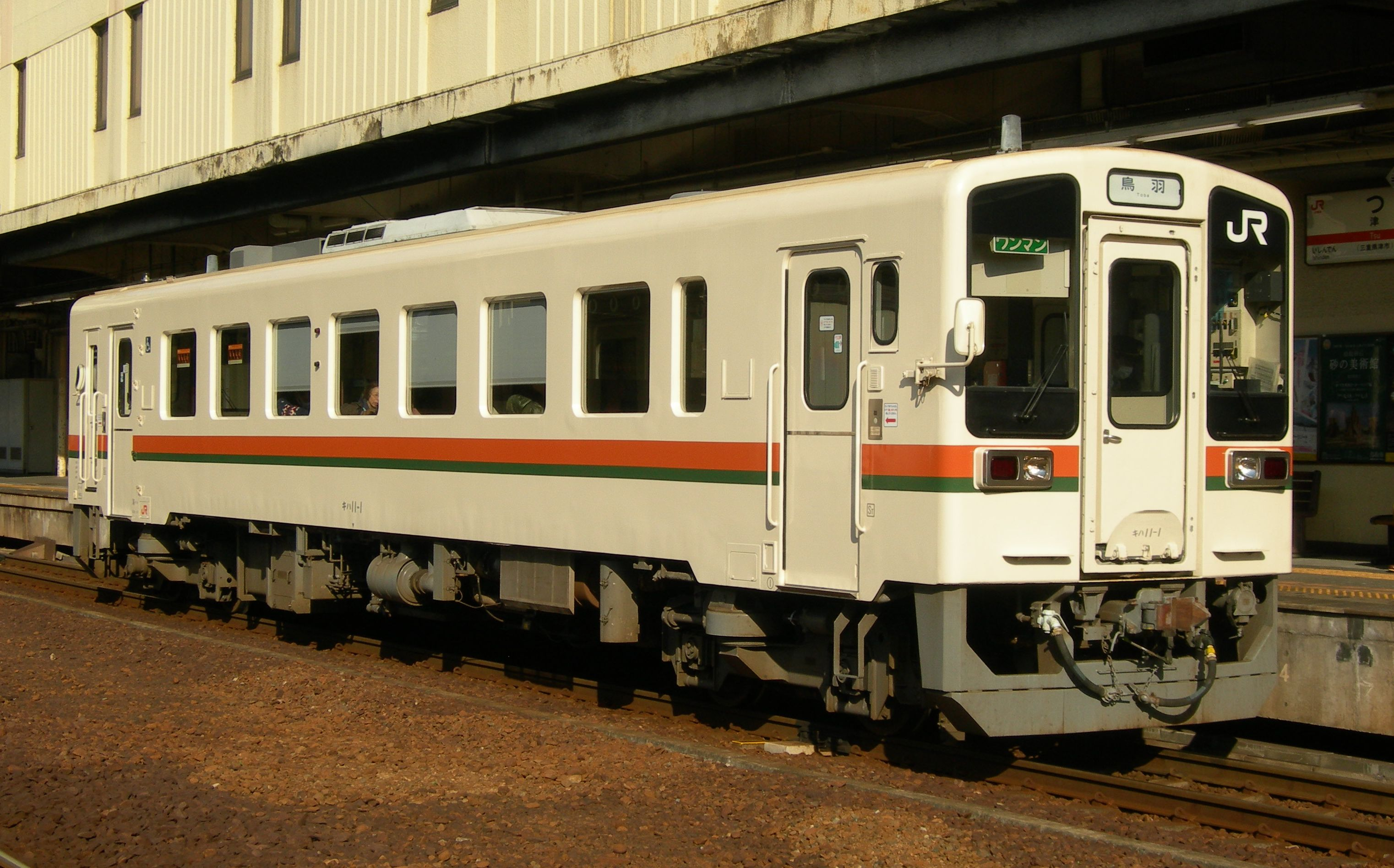
KiHa 11-1, January 2010

=== Interior ===
Seating is arranged with 2+2 abreast transverse seating and longitudinal seating at the car ends. Seating capacity is 60, with a total capacity of 110 passengers. These cars are not equipped with toilets.

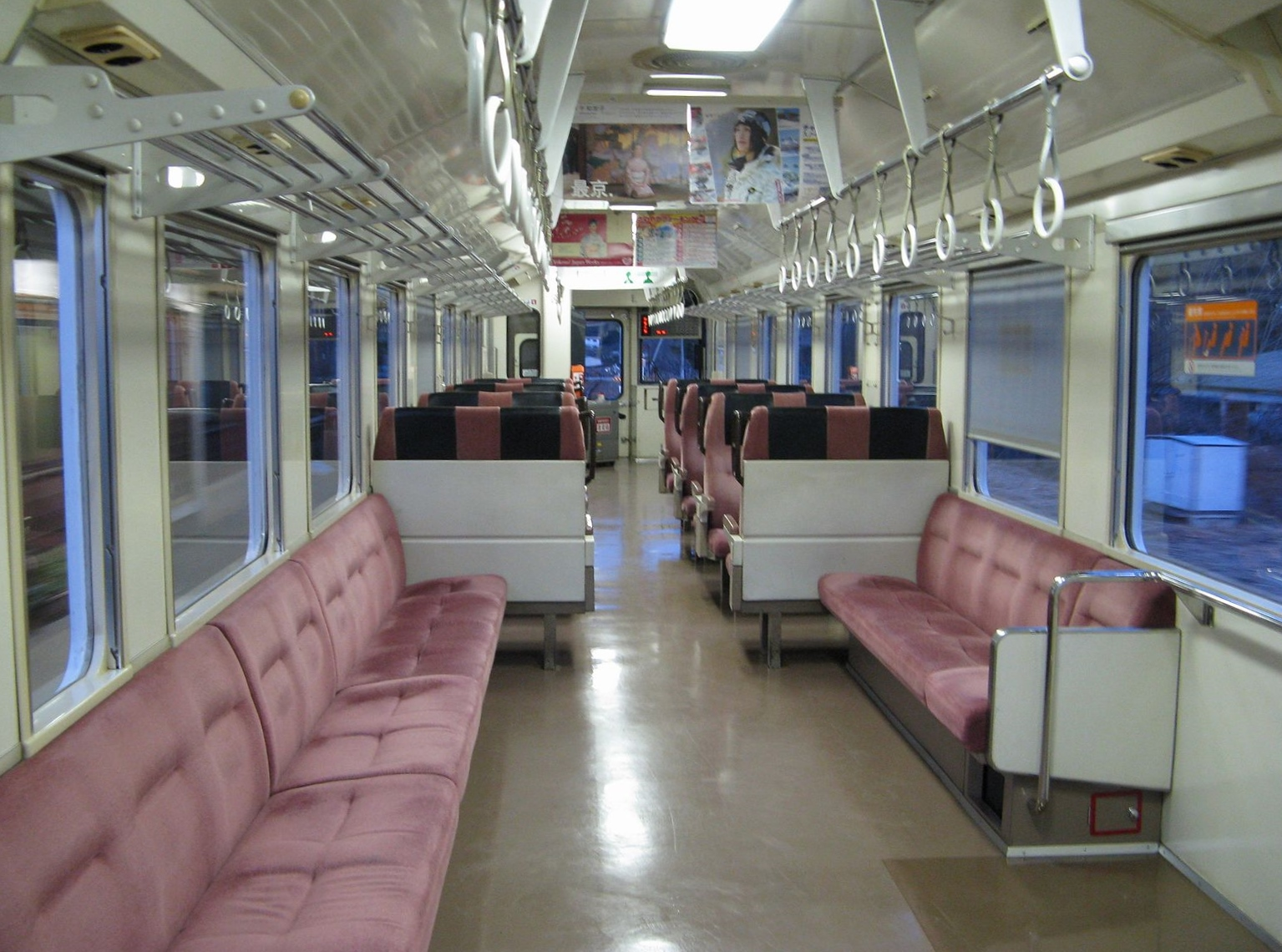

== KiHa 11-100 ==
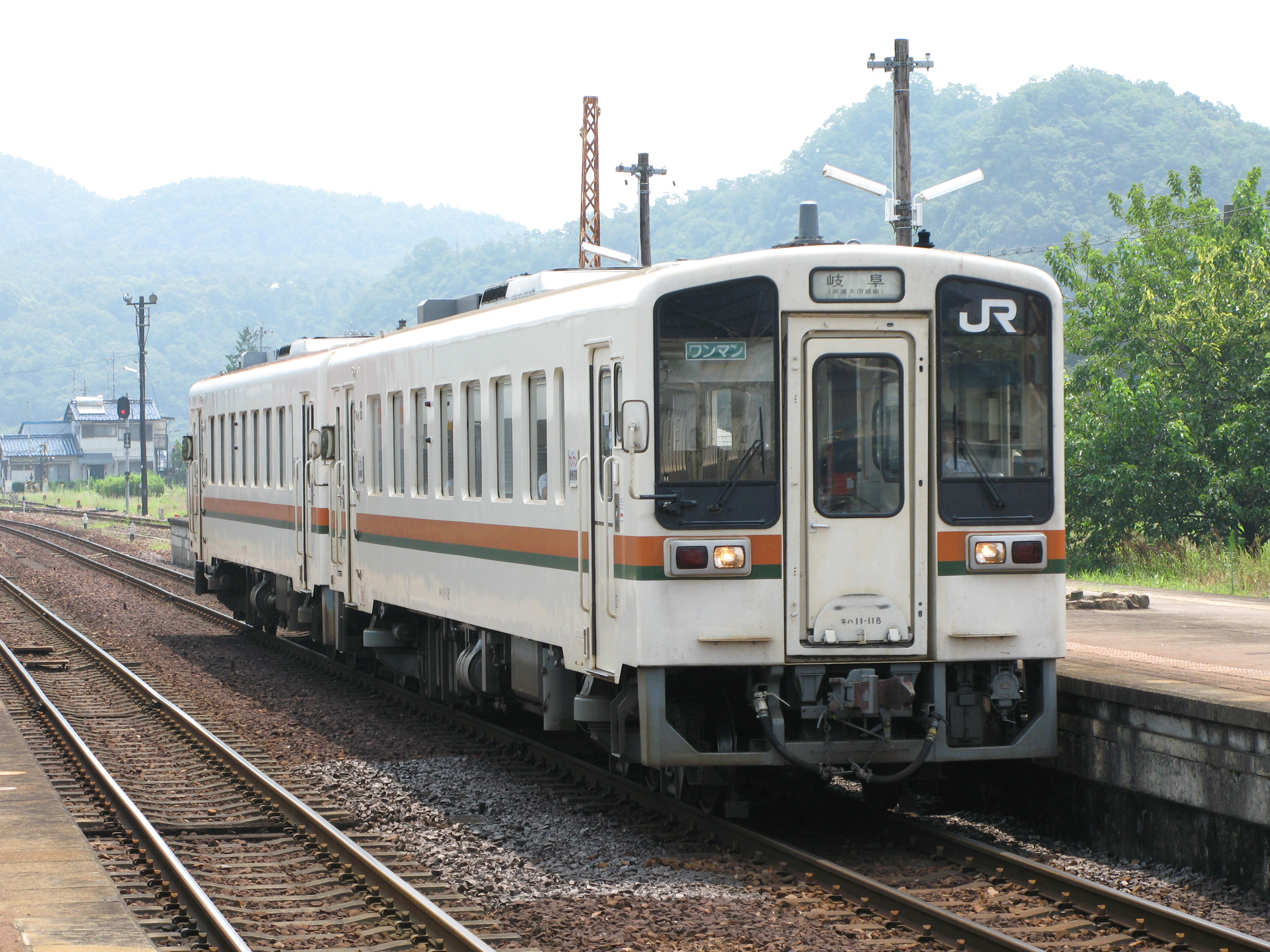
KiHa 11-118, July 2007

23 KiHa 11-100 cars (KiHa 11-101–123) were delivered from Niigata Tekkō (now Niigata Transys) between January and March 1989. Cars KiHa 11-122 and 123 were built at JR Central's Nagoya factory. Basically similar to the KiHa 11-0 design, these cars are designed for use in colder climate areas, and were initially all allocated to Mino-Ōta Depot, although six cars, 107–112, were transferred to Ise Depot in March 1990.

== KiHa 11-200 ==
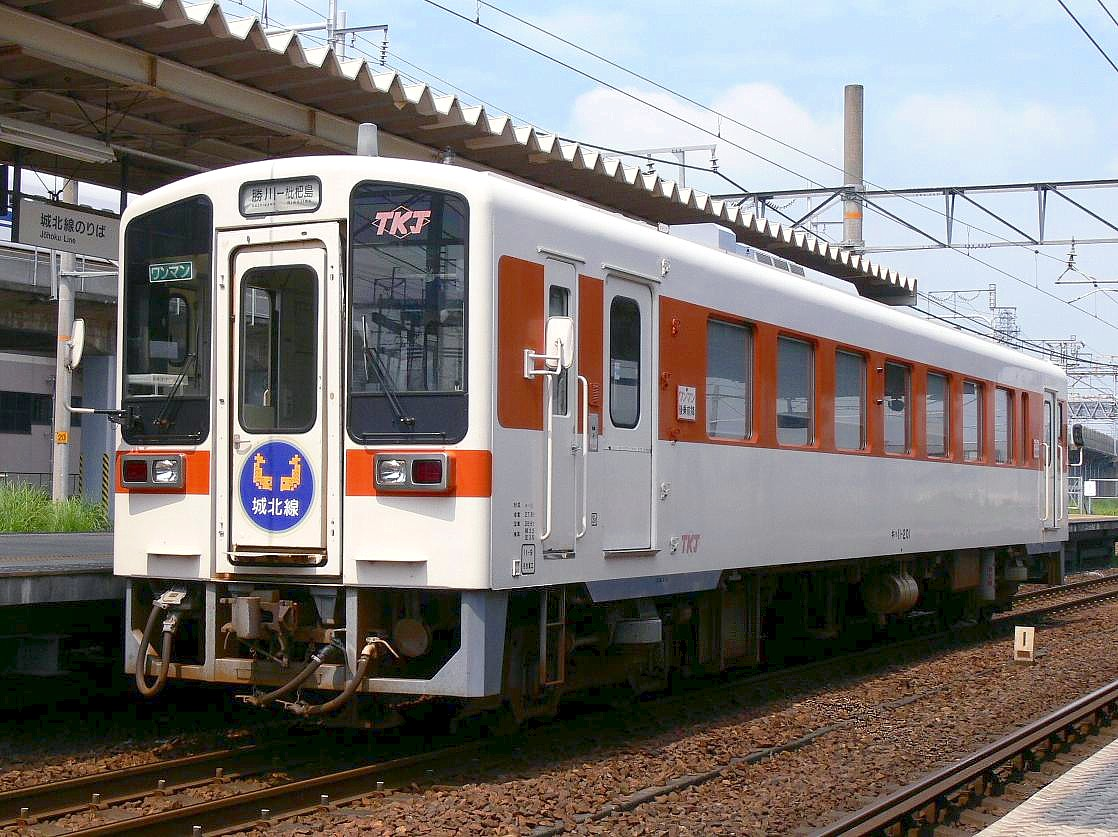
Tokai Transport Service KiHa 11-201 in August 2006

Four KiHa 11-200 cars (KiHa 11-201–204) were built by Niigata Tekkō (now Niigata Transys) in 1993 for use on the Tōkai Transport Service Jōhoku Line. These cars are based on the KiHa 11-100 design, but without internal door steps. KiHa 11-203–204 were subsequently reallocated to JR Central's Mino-Ōta Depot and are used interchangeably with other JR Central KiHa 11s.

KiHa 11-201 was withdrawn from Johoku Line services on 23 September 2015, and sold to the Hitachinaka Kaihin Railway in Ibaraki Prefecture. The other car owned by TKJ, Kiha 11-202, was withdrawn in March 2016 after its final run on 19 March, and moved to the Hitachinaka Kaihin Railway later in March.

== KiHa 11-300 ==
Six 2nd-batch KiHa 11-300 cars (KiHa 11-301–306) were delivered to Ise Depot from Niigata Tekkō (now Niigata Transys) in March 1999. These differ significantly from earlier cars in having unpainted stainless steel bodies. Passenger windows are 50 mm (2.0 in) taller and 140 mm (5.5 in) wider than on earlier batches. They are equipped with universal access toilets and a wheelchair space, reducing seating capacity to 46, but with the overall capacity remaining at 110 passengers.

The KiHa 11-300 cars are normally used on the Meishō Line.

Two former JR Central cars were transferred to the TKJ to replace older KiHa 11-200 series cars, following modifications, including the addition of LCD passenger information screens. KiHa 11-301 entered service on the line from 24 September 2015, and KiHa 11-302 was transferred in March 2016. In June 2016, car KiHa 11-302 received a modified livery, with an orange band at window level similar to the style of the KiHa 11-200s replacing the orange waistline stripe inherited from JR Central.

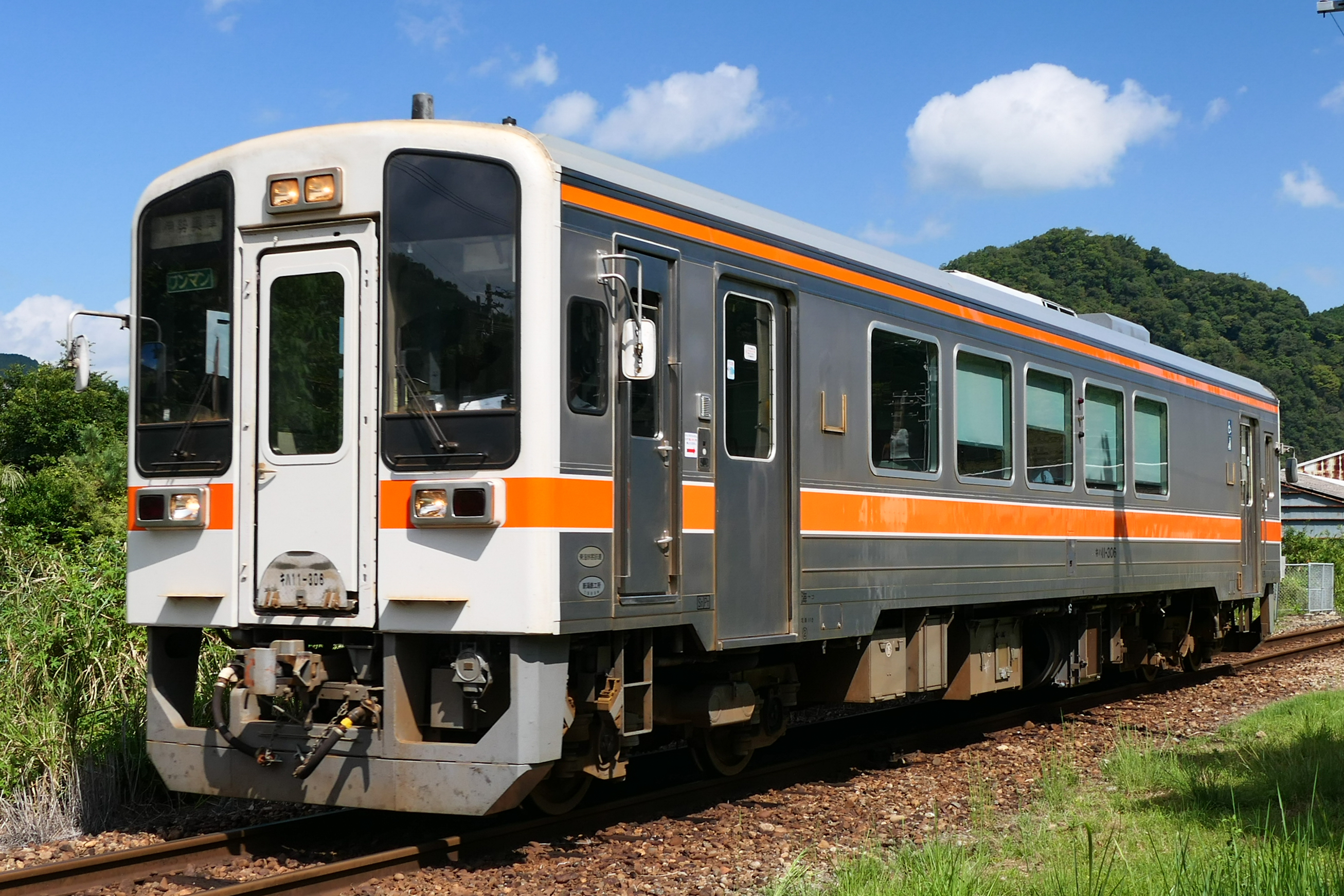
KiHa 11-306 on the Meisho Line in September 2023

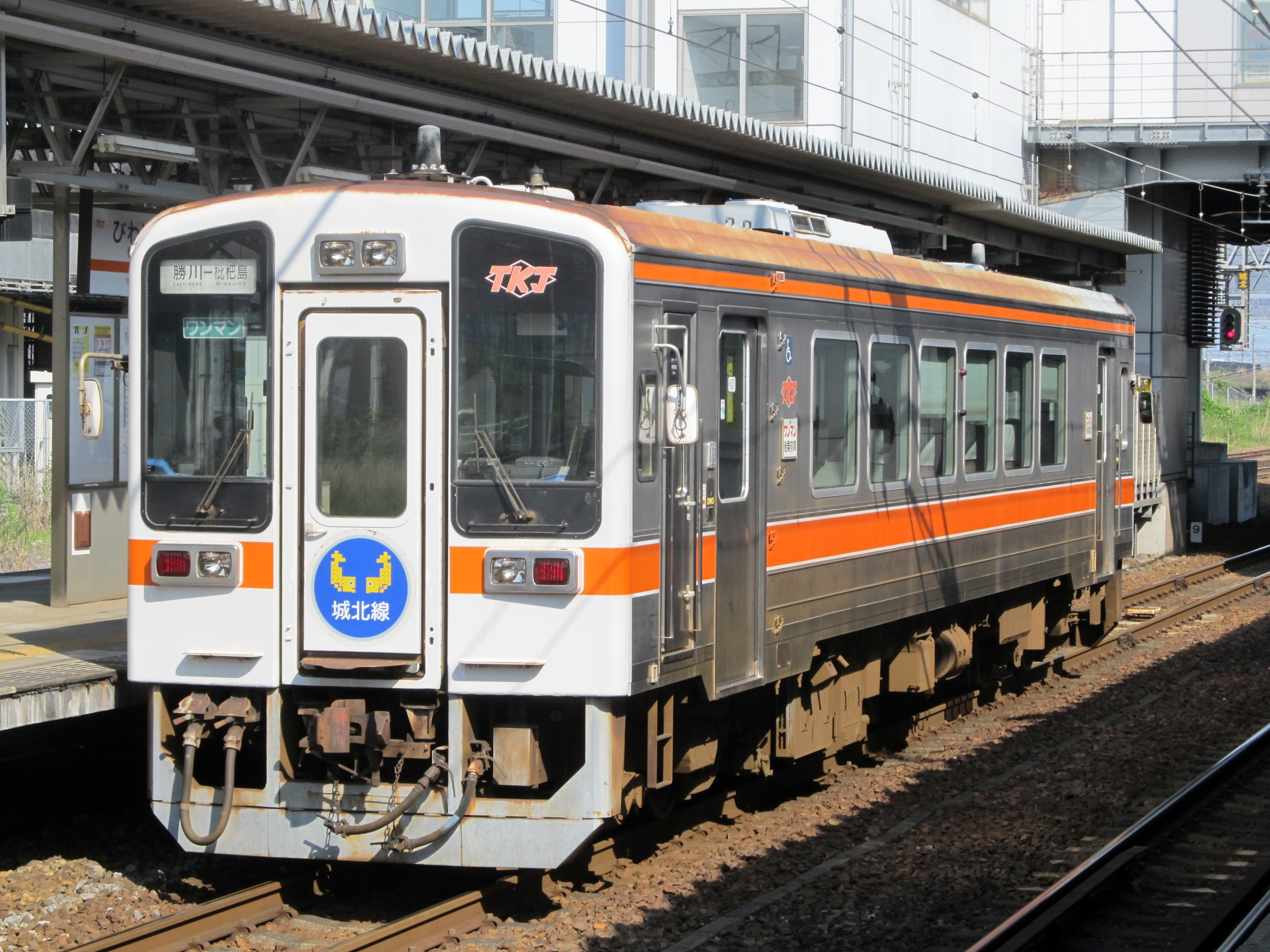
KiHa 11-301 on the JR-Central Transport Service Jōhoku Line in May 2022

== Resale ==
=== Hitachinaka Seaside Railway ===
In April 2015, three former JR Central cars, KiHa 11-123/203/204, were sold to the Hitachinaka Seaside Railway in Ibaraki Prefecture. Two more KiHa 11-200 series cars formerly owned by TKJ were resold to the Hitachinaka Seaside Railway in 2015 and 2016. Of these, KiHa 11-201 was moved by road to the Hitachinaka Seaside Railway in September 2015, and KiHa 11-202 was moved by road to the Hitachinaka Seaside Railway in March 2016.

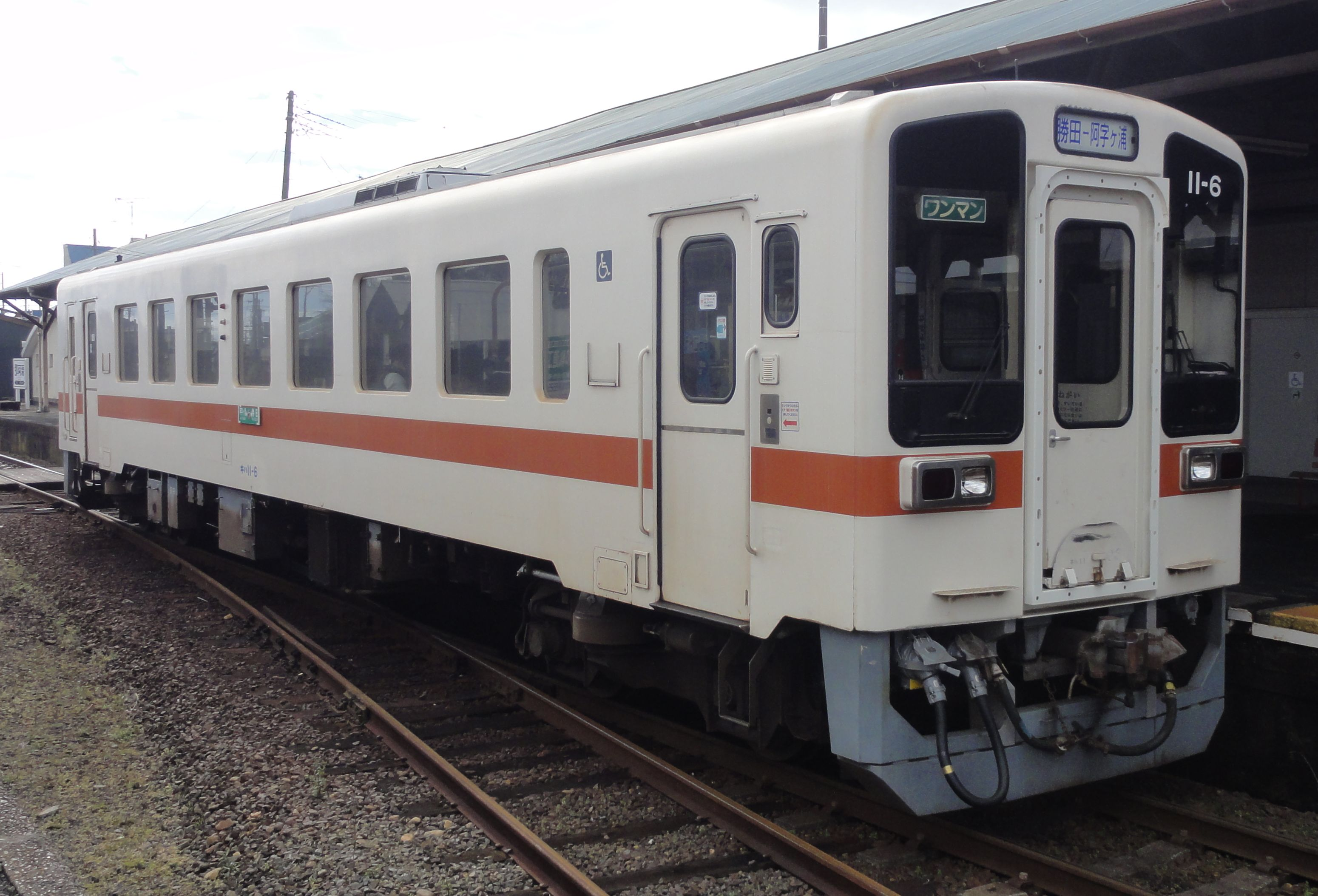
Hitachinaka Seaside Railway KiHa 11-6 (former TKJ KiHa 11-203) in February 2016

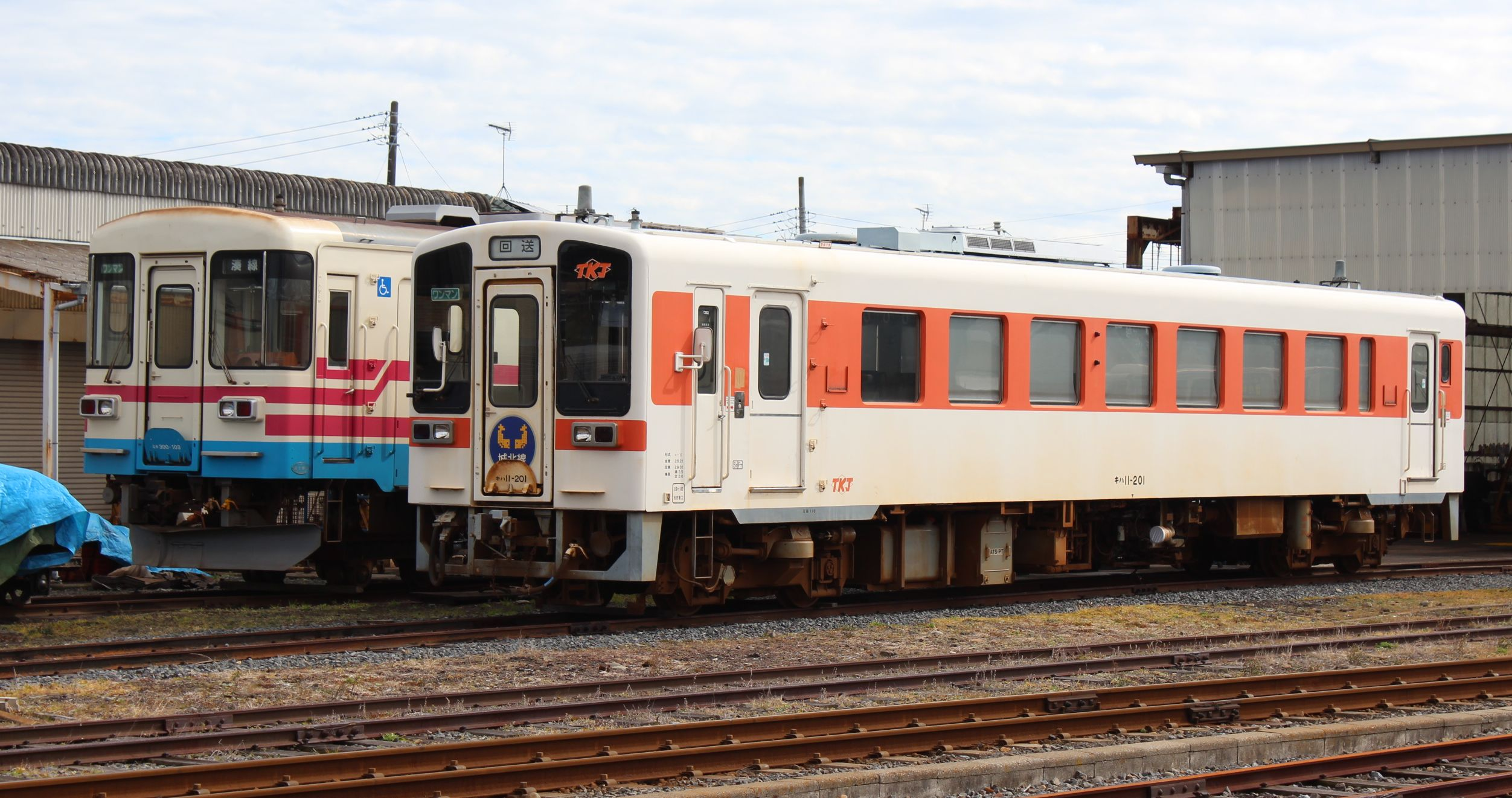
Former TKJ KiHa 11-201 on the Hitachinaka Seaside Railway in February 2016

=== Myanmar ===
16 former KiHa 11 cars were shipped to Myanmar in 2015, and reclassified as RBE (rail bus engine).

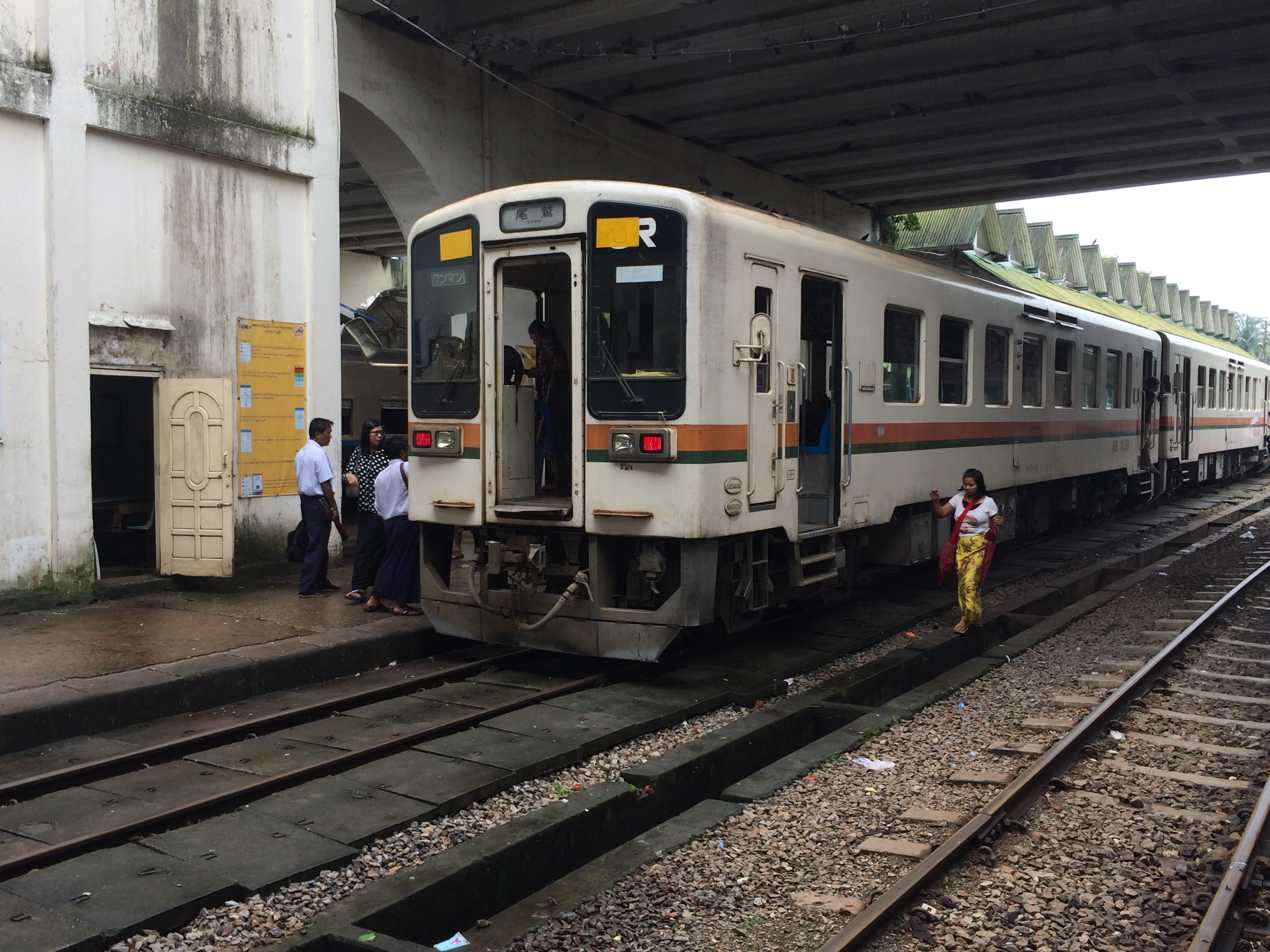
Former KiHa 11 cars at Yangon Central Railway Station in Myanmar in July 2017

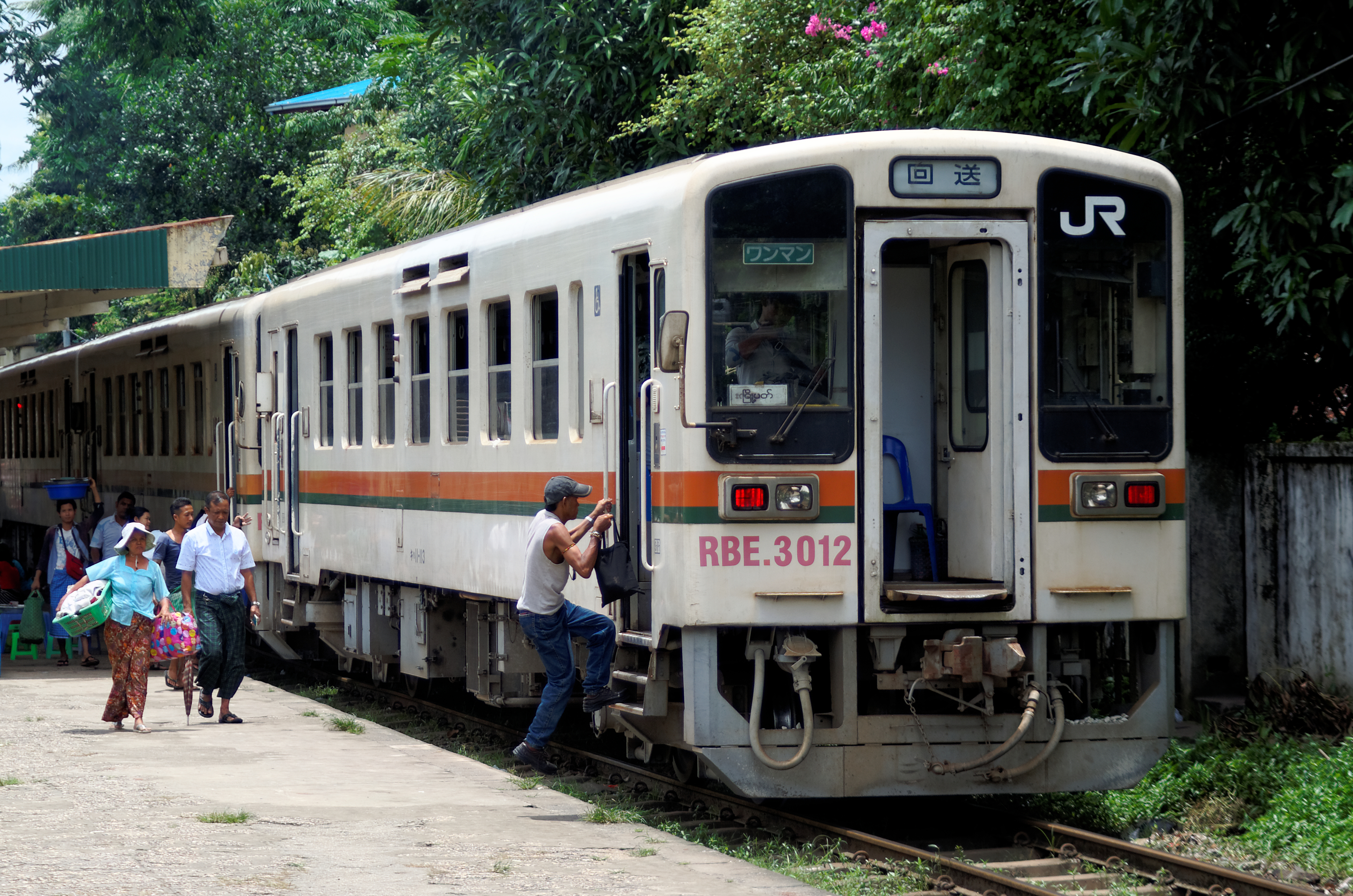
Former KiHa 11 cars at Yangon Central Railway Station in Myanmar in August 2016
