= Nakaminato Station =

Railway station in Hitachinaka, Ibaraki Prefecture, Japan

Nakaminato Station 那珂湊駅
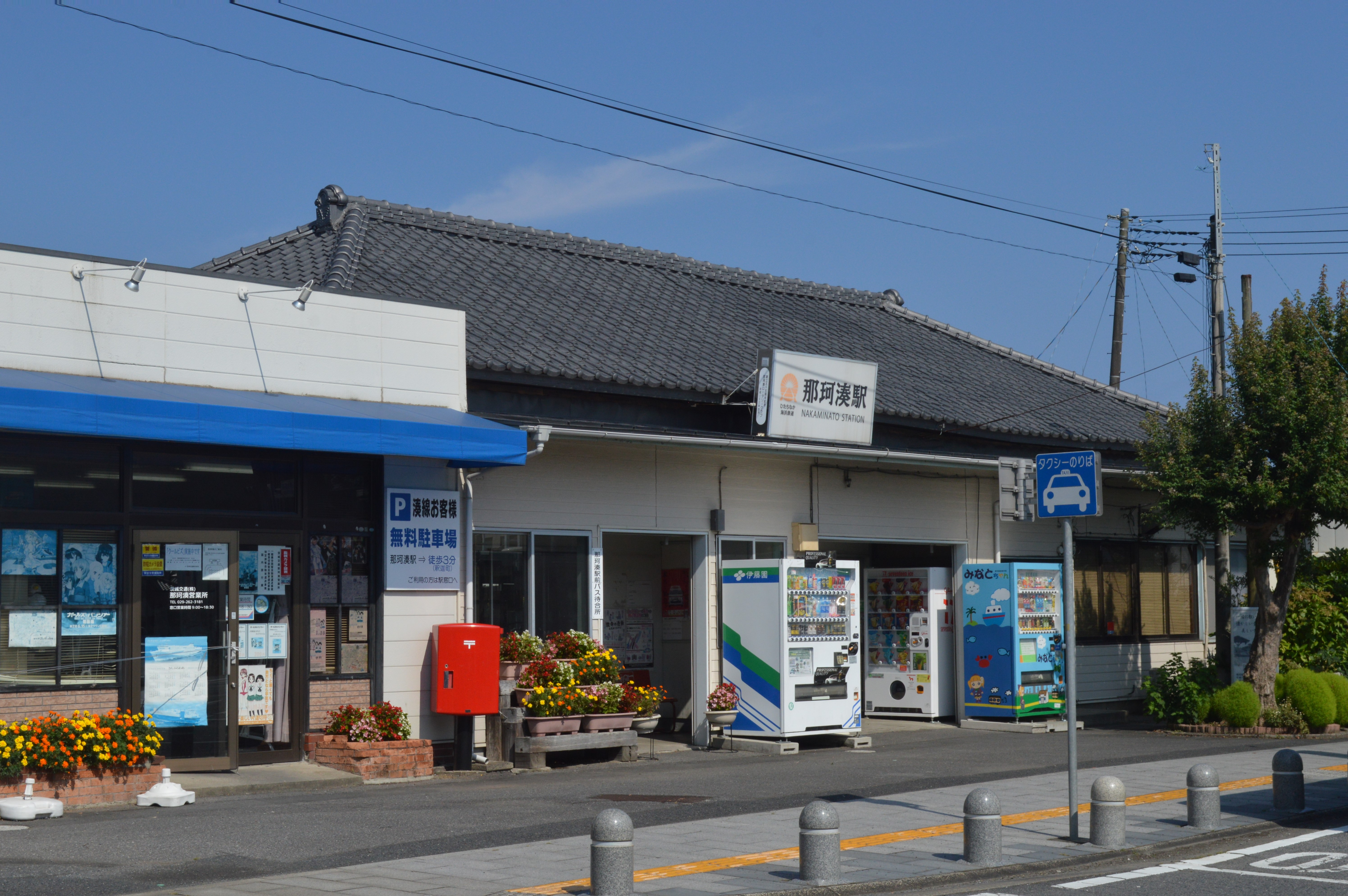
- Entrance of Nakaminato Station in September 2020

General information
- Location: Shakamachi, Hitachinaka-shi, Ibaraki-ken 311-1225; Japan
- Coordinates: 36.3447°N 140.5880°E
- Operator: Hitachinaka Seaside Railway
- Line: ■ Minato Line
- Distance: 8.2 km from Katsuta
- Platforms: 3 (1 island platform, 1 side platform)
- Tracks: 3

Other information
- Status: Staffed
- Website: Official website

History
- Opened: 25 December 1913

Passengers
- FY2011: 492 daily

Services
Preceding station	Hitachinaka Seaside Railway	Following station
Takadano-tekkyō towards Katsuta	Minato Line	Tonoyama towards Ajigaura
Location
- Location within Ibaraki Prefecture Location within Japan

Nakaminato Station (那珂湊駅, Nakaminato-eki) is a passenger railway station on the Minato Line in the city of Hitachinaka, Ibaraki, Japan, operated by the third-sector railway operator Hitachinaka Seaside Railway.

== Lines ==
Nakaminato Station is served by the 14.3 km single-track Hitachinaka Seaside Railway Minato Line from Katsuta to Ajigaura, and lies 8.2 km from the starting point of the line at Katsuta.

== Station layout ==
The station is staffed and consists of a one side platform and one island platform, serving three tracks. It is the only station on the line which is fully staffed. The line's maintenance depot adjoins the station.

== History ==
Nakaminato Station opened on 25 December 1913 as a station on the Minato Railway.

== Passenger statistics ==
In fiscal 2011, the station was used by an average of 492 passengers daily.

== Surrounding area ==
- center of former Nakaminato city
- Nakaminato Post Office
- Nakagawa River
- Nakaminato fishing port

== Bus routes ==
Ibaraki Kotsu

- For Oarai Station and Mito Station

== See also ==
- List of railway stations in Japan
