= Ajigaura Station =

Railway station in Hitachinaka, Ibaraki Prefecture, Japan

Ajigaura Station 阿字ヶ浦駅
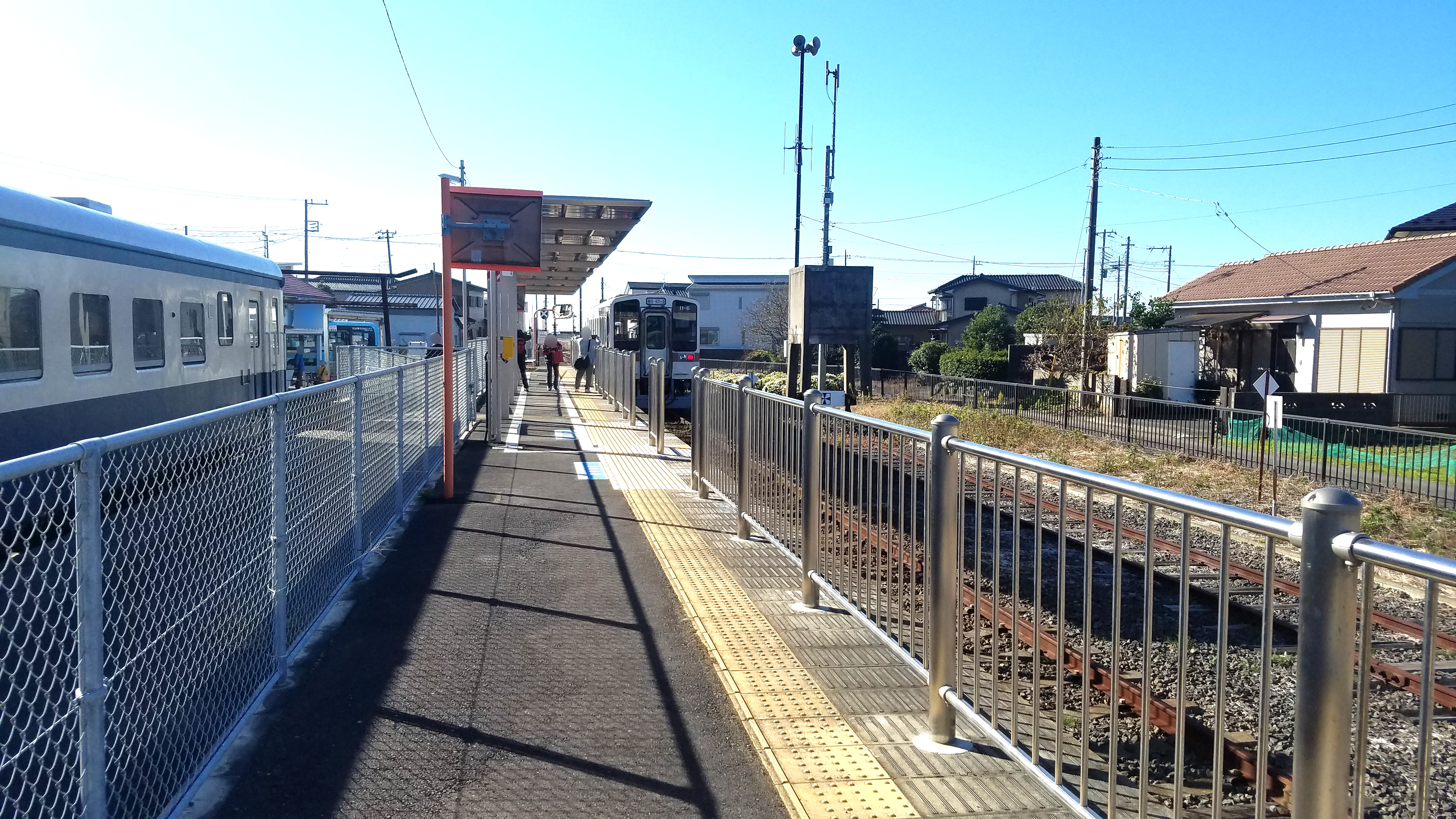
- Ajigaura station platform, November 2021

General information
- Location: Ajigauracho, Hitachinaka-shi, Ibaraki-ken 311-1201; Japan
- Coordinates: 36.3835°N 140.612°E
- Operator: Hitachinaka Seaside Railway
- Line: ■ Minato Line
- Distance: 14.3 km from Katsuta
- Platforms: 2 (1 island platform)
- Tracks: 2 (1 not in use)

Other information
- Status: Unstaffed
- Website: Official website

History
- Opened: 7 July 1928

Passengers
- FY2011: 53 daily

Services
Preceding station	Hitachinaka Seaside Railway	Following station
Isozaki towards Katsuta	Minato Line	Terminus
Location
- Location within Ibaraki Prefecture Location within Japan

Ajigaura Station (阿字ヶ浦駅, Ajigaura-eki) is a passenger railway station on the Minato Line in the city of Hitachinaka, Ibaraki, Japan, operated by the third-sector railway operator Hitachinaka Seaside Railway.

== Lines ==
Ajigaura Station is the terminus of the 14.3 km single-track Hitachinaka Seaside Railway Minato Line from Katsuta.

== Station layout ==
The station has a single island platform, of which only one side is in use. It was built to handle trains of up to seven cars in the days in which direct Ajigaura express trains ran directly from Ueno in Tokyo. The platform is connected to the station building by a level crossing. The station is unattended.

== History ==
Ajigaura Station opened on 7 July 1928. as a station on the Minato Railway. It became an unstaffed station from 1 April 1996.

== Future development ==
Minato Line is extended to a new station which is located near Hitachi Seaside Park in 2024. You can see test trains running beyond Ajigaura Station's platforms.

== Passenger statistics ==
In fiscal 2011, the station was used by an average of 53 passengers daily.

== Surrounding area ==
- Sakatsurai Isozaki Shrine
- Ajigaura swimming beach
- Hitachi Seaside Park
