= Hisanohama Station =

Railway station in Iwaki, Fukushima Prefecture, Japan

Hisanohama Station 久ノ浜駅
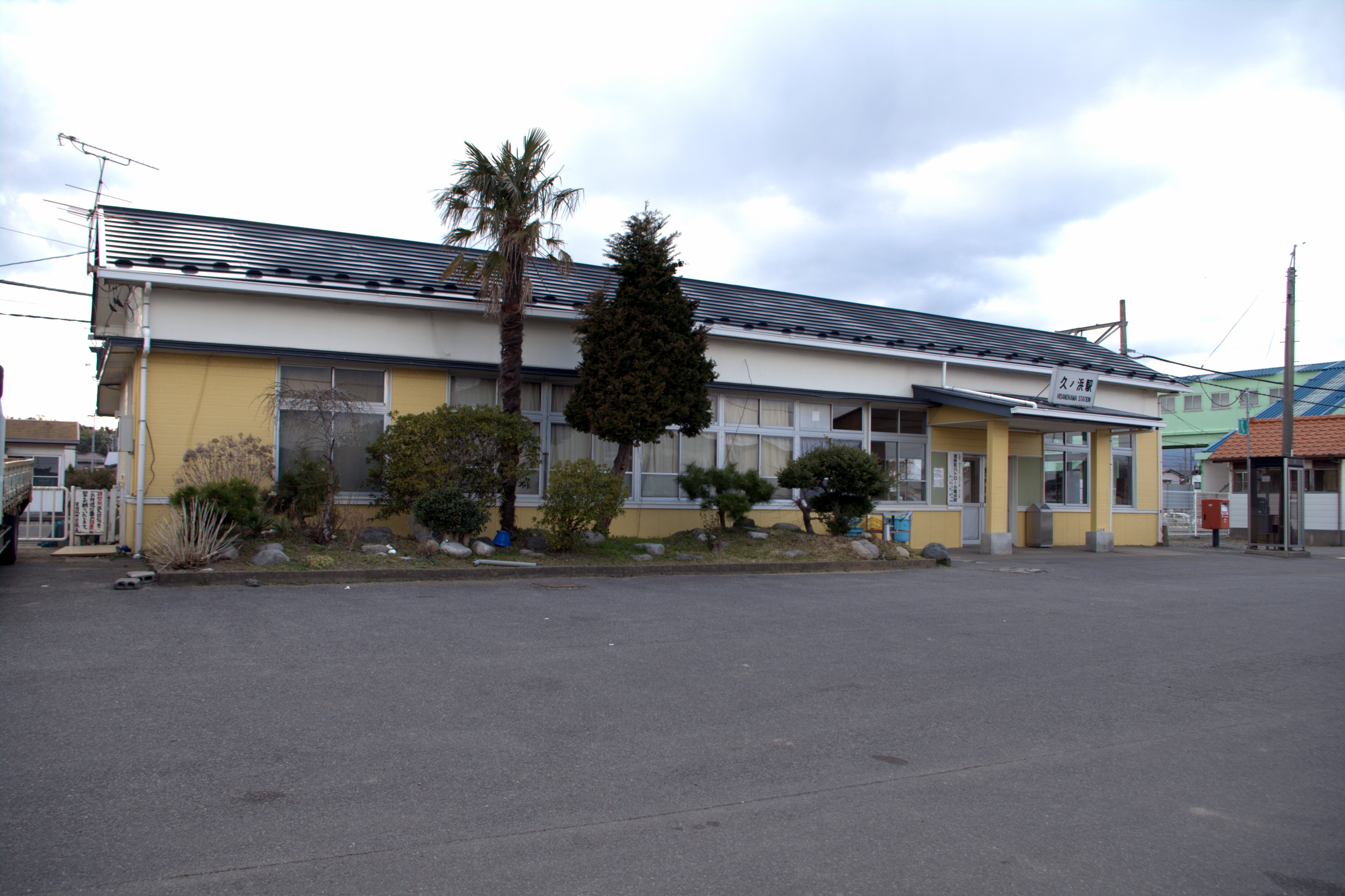
- Hisanohama Station, April 2011

General information
- Location: Hisanohama-cho, Iwaki-shi, Fukushima-ken 979-0333; Japan
- Coordinates: 37.1423°N 140.9953°E
- Operator: JR East
- Line: ■ Jōban Line
- Distance: 224.0 km from Nippori
- Platforms: 2 side platforms
- Tracks: 2

Other information
- Status: Unstaffed
- Website: Official website

History
- Opened: August 29, 1897

Passengers
- FY2018: 182 daily

Services
| Preceding station | JR East | Following station |
|---|---|---|
| Yotsukura towards Shinagawa | Jōban Line Local-Futsuu | Suetsugi towards Sendai |
Location
- Location within Fukushima Prefecture Location within Japan

Hisanohama Station (久ノ浜駅, Hisanohama eki) is a railway station in the city of Iwaki, Fukushima, Japan, operated by East Japan Railway Company (JR East).

== Lines ==
Hisanohama Station is served by the Jōban Line, and is located 224.0 km from the official starting point of the line at Nippori.

== Station layout ==
The station has two opposed side platforms connected to the station building by a footbridge. The station is unstaffed. (From March 14, 2020.)

=== Platforms ===
| 1 | ■ Jōban Line | for Iwaki and Mito |
| 2 | ■ Jōban Line | for Hirono and Tomioka |

== History ==
Hisanohama Station opened on August 29, 1897. The station was absorbed into the JR East network upon the privatization of the Japanese National Railways (JNR) on April 1, 1987.

From March 11 to October 10, 2011, following the Great East Japan earthquake and the Fukushima Daiichi nuclear disaster, train services were replaced by a bus operation. Services past Tomioka Station were not resumed until March 2020. It became an unstaffed station on March 14, 2020.

== Passenger statistics ==
In fiscal 2018, the station was used by an average of 182 passengers daily (boarding passengers only).

== Surrounding area ==
- Hisanohama Post Office
- National Route 6

== See also ==
- List of railway stations in Japan
