= Yotsukura Station =

Railway station in Iwaki, Fukushima Prefecture, Japan

Yotsukura Station 四ツ倉駅
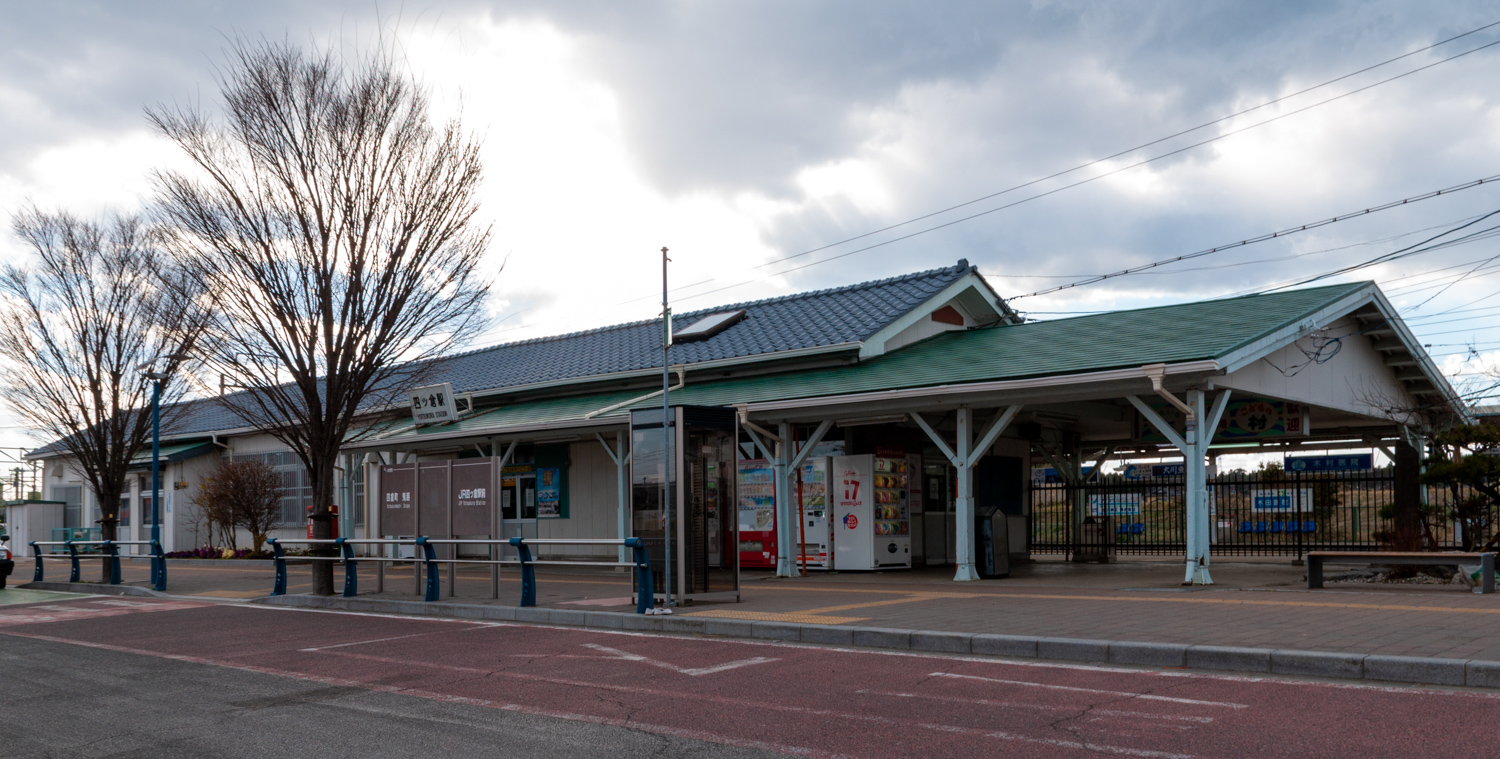
- Yotsukura Station, April 2011

General information
- Location: Yotsukura, Iwaki-shi, Fukushima-ken 979-0201; Japan
- Coordinates: 37.1025°N 140.9803°E
- Operator: JR East
- Line: ■ Jōban Line
- Distance: 219.2 km from Nippori
- Platforms: 2 side platforms
- Tracks: 32

Other information
- Status: Staffed
- Website: Official website

History
- Opened: August 29, 1897

Passengers
- FY2018: 610 daily

Services
Preceding station	JR East	Following station
Kusano towards Shinagawa	Jōban Line Local-Futsuu	Hisanohama towards Sendai
Location
- Location within Fukushima Prefecture Location within Japan

Yotsukura Station (四ツ倉駅, Yotsukura eki) is a railway station in the city of Iwaki, Fukushima, Japan, operated by East Japan Railway Company (JR East).

== Lines ==
Yotsukura Station is served by the Jōban Line, and is located 219.2 km from the official starting point of the line at Nippori.

== Station layout ==
The station has two opposed side platforms connected to the station building by a footbridge. The station is staffed.

=== Platforms ===
1	■ Jōban Line	for Iwaki , Katsuta, Mito, Ishioka and Tsuchiura
2	■ Jōban Line	for Hisanohama, Hirono, Tomioka, Namie and Haranomachi

== History ==
Yotsukura Station opened on August 29, 1897. The station was absorbed into the JR East network upon the privatization of the Japanese National Railways (JNR) on April 1, 1987. Services were suspended from March 11 to April 17, 2011, following the 2011 Tōhoku earthquake and tsunami.

== Passenger statistics ==
In fiscal 2018, the station was used by an average of 610 passengers daily (boarding passengers only).

== Surrounding area ==
- Kusano Post Office
- National Route 6

== See also ==
- List of railway stations in Japan
