= Kusano Station (Fukushima) =

Railway station in Iwaki, Fukushima Prefecture, Japan

Kusano Station 草野駅
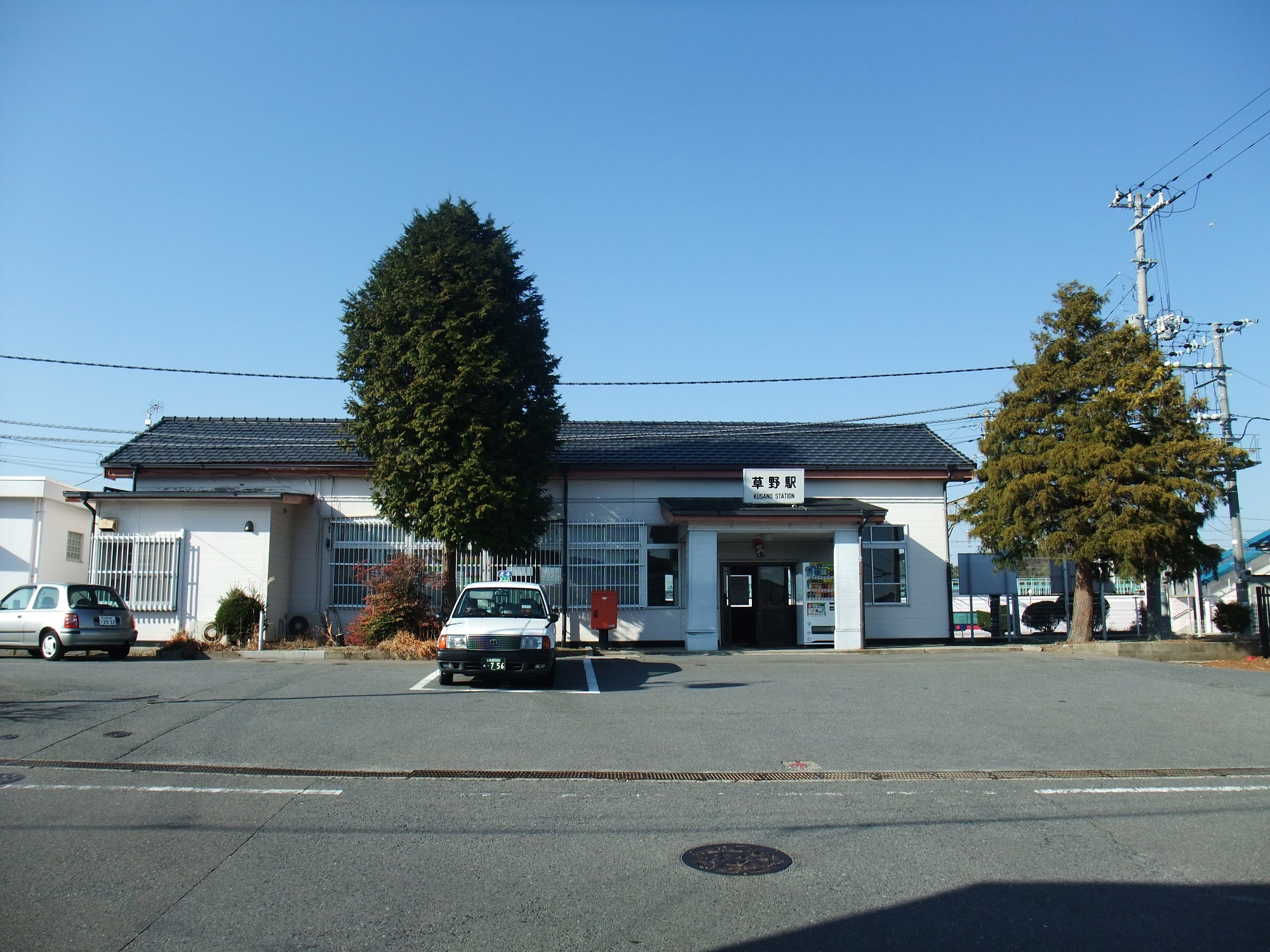
- Kusano Station, January 2013

General information
- Location: Taira Izumisaki, Iwaki-shi, Fukushima-ken 970-0112; Japan
- Coordinates: 37°04′26″N 140°56′51″E
- Operator: JR East
- Line: ■ Jōban Line
- Distance: 214.8 km from Nippori
- Platforms: 1 side + 1 island platform
- Tracks: 3

Other information
- Status: Unstaffed
- Website: Official website

History
- Opened: August 29, 1897

Passengers
- FY2018: 397 daily

Services
Preceding station	JR East	Following station
Iwaki towards Shinagawa	Jōban Line Local-Futsuu	Yotsukura towards Sendai
Location
- Location within Fukushima Prefecture Location within Japan

Kusano Station (草野駅, Kusano-eki) is a railway station in Iwaki, Fukushima, Japan, operated by East Japan Railway Company (JR East).

== Lines ==
Kusano Station is served by the Jōban Line, and is located 214.8 km from the official starting point of the line at Nippori.

== Station layout ==
The station has an island platform and a side platform connected by a footbridge. It became an unstaffed station on March 14, 2020.

=== Platforms ===
1	■ Jōban Line	for Iwaki, Isohara, Takahagi, Hitachi, Katsuta and Mito
2	■ Jōban Line	for starting trains
3	■ Jōban Line	for Yotsukura, Hirono Tomioka, Namie and Haranomachi

== History ==
Kusano Station opened on August 29, 1897. The station was absorbed into the JR East network upon the privatization of Japanese National Railways (JNR) on April 1, 1987. Services were suspended from March 11 to April 17, 2011, following the 2011 Tōhoku earthquake and tsunami.

== Passenger statistics ==
In fiscal 2018, the station was used by an average of 397 passengers daily (boarding passengers only).

== Surrounding area ==
- Kusano Post Office
- National Route 6

== See also ==
- List of railway stations in Japan
