= Jōban Line =

Railway line in Japan

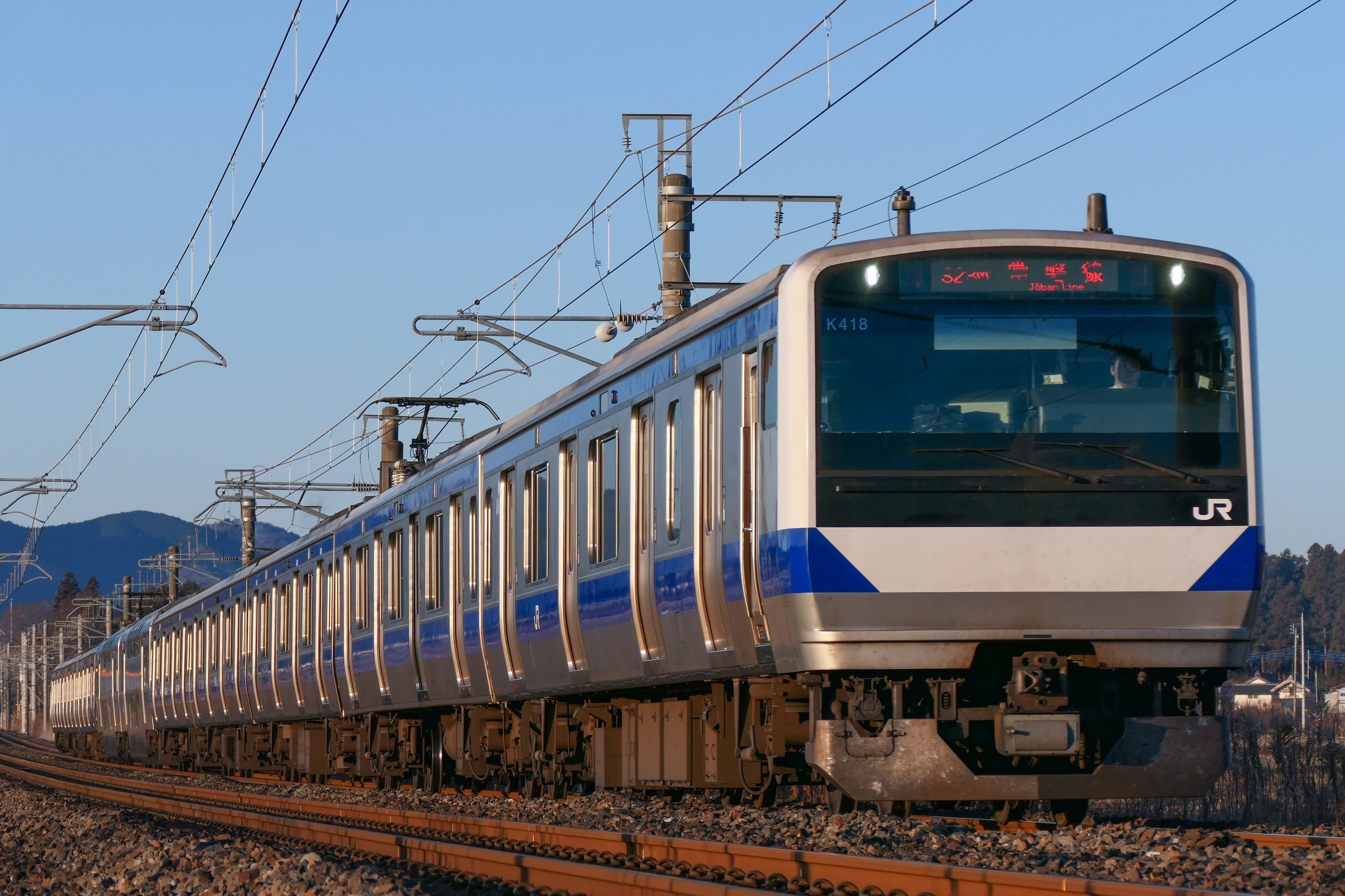
- Joban Line Series E531 between Tomobe and Uchihara stations

Overview
- Native name: 常磐線
- Owner: JR East
- Locale: Tokyo, Chiba, Ibaraki, Fukushima, Miyagi prefectures
- Termini: Nippori (services extended to Shinagawa); Iwanuma (services extended to Sendai (Miyagi))
- Stations: 85 on the Joban Line; 4 on the Ueno-Tokyo Line

Service
- Type: Heavy rail
- Operator(s): JR East, JR Freight

History
- Opened: 16 January 1889; 137 years ago
- Completed: 1 April 1905; 121 years ago

Technical
- Track length: 368.0 km (228.7 mi)
- Track gauge: 1,067 mm (3 ft 6 in)
- Electrification: 1,500 V DC & 20 kV AC 50 Hz (overhead catenary)
Route map

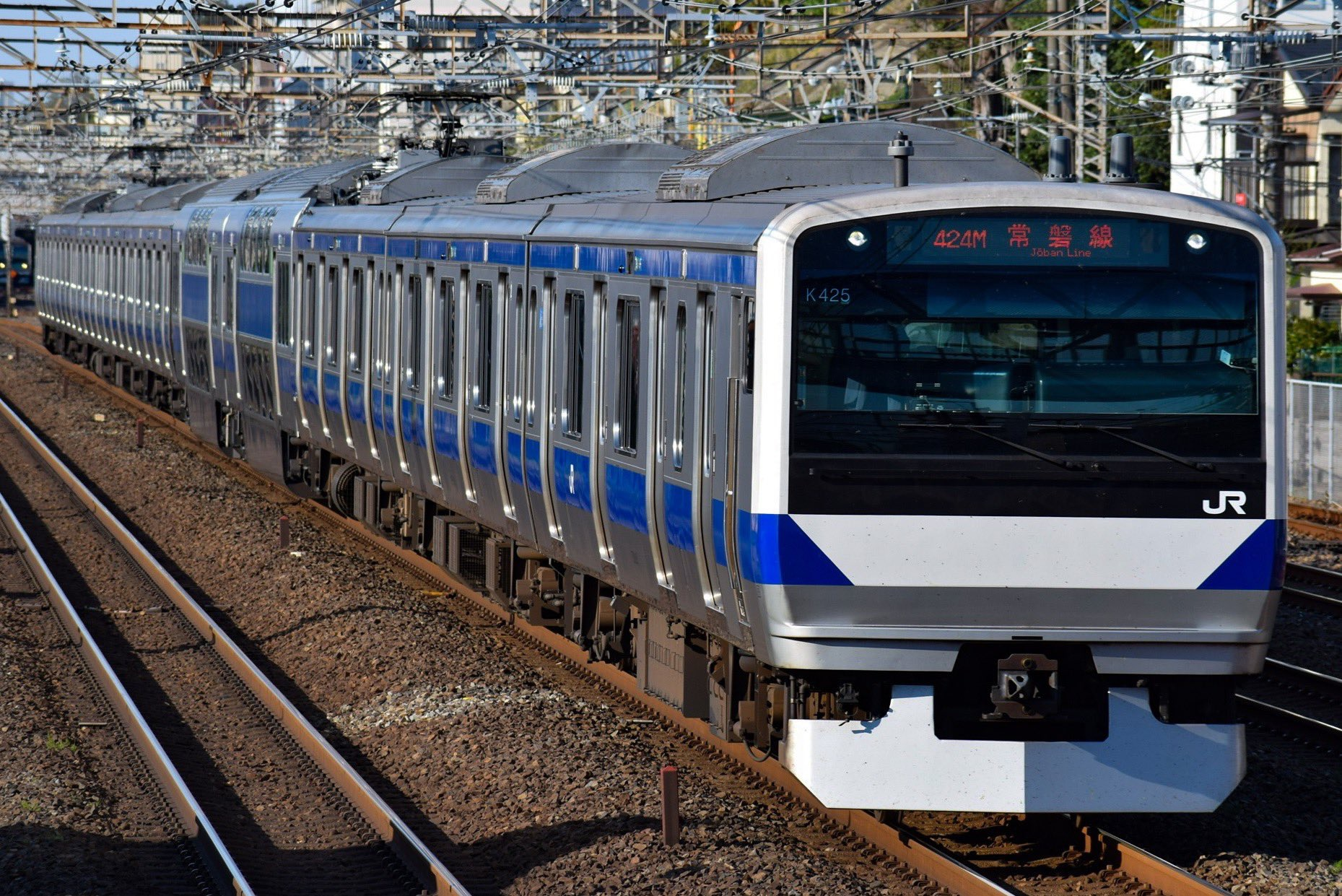
E531 series EMU between Matsudo and Kanamachi stations

(video) Riding in a Jōban Line train as another Jōban Line train passes in the other direction

The Jōban Line (Japanese: 常磐線, Hepburn: Jōban-sen) is a railway line in Japan operated by the East Japan Railway Company (JR East). The line officially began at Nippori Station in Arakawa, Tokyo and ended at Iwanuma Station in Iwanuma, Miyagi. However, following the inauguration of the Ueno–Tokyo Line, Jōban Line services are operationally extended to originate from Shinagawa or Ueno. Likewise, through‑running operations continue beyond Iwanuma, where Jōban Line trains proceed onto the Tōhoku Main Line tracks to Sendai. The route generally parallels the Pacific coastline of Chiba, Ibaraki, and Fukushima Prefectures.

The name "Jōban" is derived from the names of the former provinces of Jōshū (Japanese: 常陸), and Banshū (Japanese: 磐城), which are connected by the line to reach Tokyo.

The section of the Jōban Line between Tomioka and Namie, which extends through the exclusion zone surrounding the Fukushima Daiichi nuclear meltdown, closed in the wake of the 2011 Tōhoku earthquake and tsunami and Fukushima Daiichi nuclear disaster. After some major repairs, the section reopened on 14 March 2020 after 9 years without service.

== Basic data ==
- Operators, distances:
  - East Japan Railway Company (JR East) (Services and tracks)
    - Nippori – Haranomachi – Iwanuma: 343.1 km (213.2 mi)
    - Mikawashima – Sumidagawa – Minami-Senju (Sumidagawa freight branch): 5.7 km (3.5 mi)
    - Mikawashima – Tabata (Tabata freight branch): 1.6 km (1.0 mi)
  - Japan Freight Railway Company (JR Freight) (Services)
    - Mikawashima – Haranomachi – Iwanuma: 341.9 km (212.4 mi)
    - Mikawashima – Sumidagawa – Minami-Senju (Sumidagawa freight branch): 5.7 km (3.5 mi)
    - Mikawashima – Tabata (Tabata freight branch): 1.6 km (1.0 mi)
- Double/quadruple tracking:
  - Quadruple: Ayase – Toride
  - Double: Nippori – Ayase, Toride – Yotsukura, Hirono – Kido, Ōno – Futaba
- Electrification:
  - 1,500 V DC: Nippori – Toride, Mikawashima – Sumidagawa – Minami-Senju, Mikawashima – Tabata
  - 20 kV AC, 50 Hz: Fujishiro – Iwanuma. This section of the line, along with a nearby section of the Tsukuba Express in Ibaraki Prefecture (Moriya – Tsukuba), uses alternating current in order to minimize interference with the nearby Kakioka Magnetic Observatory in Ishioka.
  - The dead section is located between Toride and Fujishiro
- Railway signalling:
  - Automatic Train Control (ATC): Ayase – Toride
  - Automatic Signaling Block for all other sections
- operation control
  - ATOS: Ueno – Hatori, local train track Ayase – Toride
  - CTC: All other sections

== Services ==
The Jōban Line connects Tokyo and the Tōhoku region. After the opening of the Tōhoku Shinkansen in 1982, the Jōban Line was split into two parts at Iwaki. South of Iwaki is mainly double track (Ayase - Toride is quad track), and north of Iwaki is predominantly single track. After the Fukushima disaster in 2011, the Jōban Line is further segmented in the Iwaki – Sendai section.

=== Shinagawa – Ueno – Iwaki ===
This entire section is served by several types of train services, which are described in the following subsections according to where they operate.

Limited express trains operate across the entire section.

==== Shinagawa – Ueno – Toride ====
This section is mainly served by local, rapid, medium-distance train services serving the Greater Tokyo area.

- Local (各駅停車): These local trains are commonly referred to as the Jōban Line (Local) 常磐線各駅停車. These local trains operate through services to the Tokyo Metro Chiyoda Line to/from Yoyogi-Uehara via Ayase, where the Jōban Line and Chiyoda Line meet; some trains continue through on the Odakyu Odawara Line to/from Hon-Atsugi. Trains usually originate/terminate at Abiko. At rush hours, trains originate/terminate at Toride. Occasionally trains won't go too far, originating/terminating at Matsudo or Kashiwa.
- Rapid (快速): Rapid trains are commonly referred to as the Jōban Line (Rapid) 常磐線快速. These services run between the southern termini of Ueno or Shinagawa (via Ueno–Tokyo Line) to the northern termini of Toride. Some trains go on to the Narita Line to Narita via Abiko and are referred to as Jōban・Narita Line (常磐・成田線) trains. Rapid trains will skip some stations between Kita-Senju and Abiko, that local services mentioned above would stop.
  - Local (Medium distance) (普通): The "local" here refers to medium distance trains that operate north beyond Toride and stop at all stations north of Toride. South of Toride, they operate as rapid services and are referred to as such.
- Special rapid (特別快速): Special Rapid trains operate twice daily between Shinagawa and Tsuchiura during non-rush hours. This service is created to compete with the neighbouring railway line, the Tsukuba Express.

==== Shinagawa – Ueno – Mito – Katsuta ====
Trains that run beyond Toride are distinctly referred to as the Jōban Line (常磐線), without the term "Rapid". Trains that are called Jōban Line (Rapid) cannot go beyond Toride, as their rolling stock cannot be powered by alternating current, which is the type of electrification that the section uses.

This section is mainly served by local trains.

- Local (普通): These trains stop at every station north of Toride. Hence the name "local". There are two types of local trains:
  - Medium distance: These medium distance trains, as mentioned above, operate from central Tokyo to the north of Toride and stop at all stations there. They terminate at various stations, namely Tsuchiura, Mito and Katsuta.
    - Special rapid (特別快速): Special Rapid trains stop at every station between Toride and Tsuchiura, so they're essentially the same as the medium distance trains, but become a different service once past south of Toride.
  - Mito Line through service: These trains run through services to the Mito Line via Tomobe Station, operating from Oyama to Katsuta.

==== Mito – Iwaki ====
This section is mainly served by local trains.

- Local (普通): These trains stop at every station, operating between Mito and Takahagi / Iwaki
  - Medium distance / through service: In the early morning and late-night, few medium distance trains and Mito Line through trains operate to as far as Takahagi, which is located about mid-way in this section.

=== Iwaki – Sendai ===
Before the Fukushima Daiichi nuclear disaster and the 2011 Tōhoku earthquake and tsunami, local trains and limited express trains used to run across the entire section. However, due to the damages caused after the disaster, the section between Tomioka to Harunomachi had to be closed down, and services were suspended. After certain sections of the line were reconstructed, regular services were gradually allowed to resume.

==== Iwaki – Tomioka ====
This section is served by local service trains. This section was closed due to damage caused by the 2011 Tōhoku earthquake and tsunami, but it has since reopened. (explained below).

==== Tomioka – Namie ====
This section, which extends through the exclusion zone surrounding the Fukushima Daiichi nuclear meltdown, was suspended after the 2011 disaster. This section re-opened on 14 March 2020. Before this date, services were provided by an interim bus service.

==== Namie – Sendai ====
This section is served by local service trains which serve the Greater Sendai area.

The section was once partially closed due to the 2011 disaster, but has since reopened in stages. The reconstructed segment between Hamayoshida and Sōma was reopened on 10 December 2016, prior to which services were provided by an interim bus service. JR East inspected the segment between Namie and Odaka in preparation for the surrounding areas being cleared for re-settlement, resulting in train services between Namie and Odaka being resumed on 1 April 2017. Train services between Tatsuta and Tomioka resumed on 21 October 2017.

== Station list ==
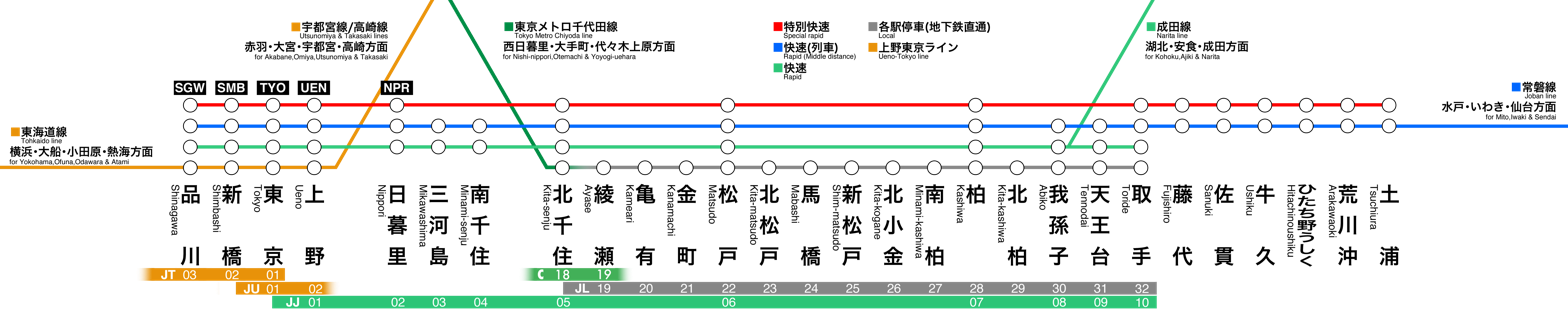

- The above is a diagram indicating Jōban Line service patterns within Greater Tokyo.
- For more information on limited express services (i.e.Hitachi and Tokiwa), see their respective pages.

=== Shinagawa – Ueno – Mito – Iwaki ===
Legend

- Trains stop at stations marked "●" and pass those marked "|"
- Few trains stop at stations marked "△"
- Note: Trains going beyond Tsuchiura and listed as '15 cars' on timetables will be reduced to a max to 10 cars past Tsuchiura station due to shorter platform lengths

Line	No.	Station	Distance in km (mi)		Local		Rapid	Special rapid	Tokiwa	Hitachi	Transfers	Tracks	Location	
Line	No.	Station	Between stations	Total (from Nippori)	Kankō	Futsuu	Rapid	Special rapid	Tokiwa	Hitachi	Transfers	Tracks	Location	
Tōkaidō		Shinagawa 品川	—N/a	12.6 (7.8)	(Note: to/from Tokyo Metro Chiyoda Line, Odakyu Odawara Line and Odakyu Tama Line. All trains through to/from Yoyogi-Uehara; some trains continue through on the Odakyu Odawara Line to/from Hon-Atsugi and the Odakyu Tama Line to/from Karakida)	●	●	●	●	●	Tokaido Shinkansen; Keihin–Tōhoku Line (JK20); Tōkaidō Line (JT03); Yamanote Line (JY25); Yokosuka Line (JO17); Keikyū Main Line (KK01)	Two	Minato	Tokyo
Tōkaidō		Shimbashi 新橋	4.9 (3.0)	7.7 (4.8)	(Note: to/from Tokyo Metro Chiyoda Line, Odakyu Odawara Line and Odakyu Tama Line. All trains through to/from Yoyogi-Uehara; some trains continue through on the Odakyu Odawara Line to/from Hon-Atsugi and the Odakyu Tama Line to/from Karakida)	●	●	●	|	|	Keihin–Tōhoku Line (JK24); Tōkaidō Line (JT02); Yamanote Line (JY29); Yokosuka Line (JO18); Asakusa Line (A-10); Ginza Line (G-08); Yurikamome (U-01)	Two	Minato	Tokyo
Tōkaidō	TYOJT01 JU01	Tokyo 東京	1.9 (1.2)	5.8 (3.6)	(Note: to/from Tokyo Metro Chiyoda Line, Odakyu Odawara Line and Odakyu Tama Line. All trains through to/from Yoyogi-Uehara; some trains continue through on the Odakyu Odawara Line to/from Hon-Atsugi and the Odakyu Tama Line to/from Karakida)	●	●	●	●	●	Tokaido Shinkansen; Akita Shinkansen; Hokuriku Shinkansen; Jōetsu Shinkansen; Tōhoku Shinkansen; Yamagata Shinkansen; Hokkaido Shinkansen; Chūō Line (JC01); Keihin–Tōhoku Line (JK26); Keiyō Line (JE01); Tōkaidō Line (JT01); Ueno–Tokyo Line (JU01); Yamanote Line (JY01); Marunouchi Line (M-17)	Two	Chiyoda	Tokyo
Tōhoku	TYOJT01 JU01				(Note: to/from Tokyo Metro Chiyoda Line, Odakyu Odawara Line and Odakyu Tama Line. All trains through to/from Yoyogi-Uehara; some trains continue through on the Odakyu Odawara Line to/from Hon-Atsugi and the Odakyu Tama Line to/from Karakida)	●	●	●	●	●		Two	Chiyoda	Tokyo
Tōhoku	UENJU02 JJ01	Ueno 上野	3.6 (2.2)	2.2 (1.4)	(Note: to/from Tokyo Metro Chiyoda Line, Odakyu Odawara Line and Odakyu Tama Line. All trains through to/from Yoyogi-Uehara; some trains continue through on the Odakyu Odawara Line to/from Hon-Atsugi and the Odakyu Tama Line to/from Karakida)	●	●	●	●	●	Akita Shinkansen; Hokuriku Shinkansen; Jōetsu Shinkansen; Tōhoku Shinkansen; Yamagata Shinkansen; Hokkaido Shinkansen; Keihin–Tōhoku Line (JK30); Utsunomiya Line/Takasaki Line (JU02); Ueno-Tokyo Line (JU02); Yamanote Line (JY05); Marunouchi Line (M-17); Tokyo Metro Ginza Line (G-16); Tokyo Metro Hibiya Line (H-18); Keisei Main Line (Keisei Ueno: KS-01)	Two	Taitō	Tokyo
Tōhoku		Nippori 日暮里	2.2 (1.4)	0.0 (0)	(Note: to/from Tokyo Metro Chiyoda Line, Odakyu Odawara Line and Odakyu Tama Line. All trains through to/from Yoyogi-Uehara; some trains continue through on the Odakyu Odawara Line to/from Hon-Atsugi and the Odakyu Tama Line to/from Karakida)	●	●	●	△	|	Yamanote Line (JY-07); Keihin-Tōhoku Line (JK-32); Keisei Main Line (KS-02); Nippori-Toneri Liner (NT-01)	Two	Arakawa	Tokyo
Jōban		Nippori 日暮里			(Note: to/from Tokyo Metro Chiyoda Line, Odakyu Odawara Line and Odakyu Tama Line. All trains through to/from Yoyogi-Uehara; some trains continue through on the Odakyu Odawara Line to/from Hon-Atsugi and the Odakyu Tama Line to/from Karakida)	●	●	●	△	|		Two	Arakawa	Tokyo
Jōban	JJ03	Mikawashima 三河島	1.2 (0.75)	1.2 (0.75)	(Note: to/from Tokyo Metro Chiyoda Line, Odakyu Odawara Line and Odakyu Tama Line. All trains through to/from Yoyogi-Uehara; some trains continue through on the Odakyu Odawara Line to/from Hon-Atsugi and the Odakyu Tama Line to/from Karakida)	●	●	|	|	|		Two	Arakawa	Tokyo
Jōban	JJ04	Minami-Senju 南千住	2.2 (1.4)	3.4 (2.1)	(Note: to/from Tokyo Metro Chiyoda Line, Odakyu Odawara Line and Odakyu Tama Line. All trains through to/from Yoyogi-Uehara; some trains continue through on the Odakyu Odawara Line to/from Hon-Atsugi and the Odakyu Tama Line to/from Karakida)	●	●	|	|	|	Tokyo Metro Hibiya Line (H-21); Tsukuba Express (TX-04)	Two	Arakawa	Tokyo
Jōban	JJ05	Kita-Senju 北千住	1.8 (1.1)	5.2 (3.2)	● (Note: Local trains to/from the Tokyo Metro Chiyoda Line use the underground Chiyoda Line platforms.)	●	●	●	|	|	Tokyo Metro Chiyoda Line (C-18); Tokyo Metro Hibiya Line (H-22); Tobu Skytree Line (TS-09); Tsukuba Express (TX-05)	Two	Adachi	Tokyo
Jōban	JL19	Ayase 綾瀬	2.5 (1.6)	7.7 (4.8)	●	|	|	|	|	|	Tokyo Metro Chiyoda Line (C-19)	Four	Adachi	Tokyo
Jōban	JL20	Kameari 亀有	2.2 (1.4)	9.9 (6.2)	●	|	|	|	|	|		Four	Katsushika	Tokyo
Jōban	JL21	Kanamachi 金町	1.9 (1.2)	11.8 (7.3)	●	|	|	|	|	|	Keisei Kanamachi Line (KS-51)	Four	Katsushika	Tokyo
Jōban	JJ06 JL22	Matsudo 松戸	3.9 (2.4)	15.7 (9.8)	●	●	●	●	|	|	Keisei Matsudo Line (KS-88)	Four	Matsudo	Chiba
Jōban	JL23	Kita-Matsudo 北松戸	2.1 (1.3)	17.8 (11.1)	●	|	|	|	|	|		Four	Matsudo	Chiba
Jōban	JL24	Mabashi 馬橋	1.3 (0.81)	19.1 (11.9)	●	|	|	|	|	|	■ Nagareyama Line	Four	Matsudo	Chiba
Jōban	JL25	Shim-Matsudo 新松戸	1.6 (0.99)	20.7 (12.9)	●	|	|	|	|	|	Musashino Line (JM-15) ■ Nagareyama Line (Kōya)	Four	Matsudo	Chiba
Jōban	JL26	Kita-Kogane 北小金	1.3 (0.81)	22.0 (13.7)	●	|	|	|	|	|		Four	Matsudo	Chiba
Jōban	JL27	Minami-Kashiwa 南柏	2.5 (1.6)	24.5 (15.2)	●	|	|	|	|	|		Four	Kashiwa	Chiba
Jōban	JJ07 JL28	Kashiwa 柏	2.4 (1.5)	26.9 (16.7)	●	●	●	●	●	△	Tobu Urban Park Line (TD-24)	Four	Kashiwa	Chiba
Jōban	JL29	Kita-Kashiwa 北柏	2.3 (1.4)	29.2 (18.1)	●	|	|	|	|	|		Four	Kashiwa	Chiba
Jōban	JJ08 JL30	Abiko 我孫子	2.2 (1.4)	31.3 (19.4)	●	●	● (Note: Some rapid trains run between Ueno and Narita via Abiko)	|	|	|	■ Narita Line (Abiko Branch Line), some through services for Narita	Four	Abiko	Chiba
Jōban	JJ09 JL31	Tennōdai 天王台	2.7 (1.7)	34.0 (21.1)	○ (Note: Only mornings and evenings between Abiko and Toride. From March 2021, services are going to run only on weekday mornings and evenings.)	●	●	|	|	|		Four	Abiko	Chiba
Jōban	JJ10 JL32	Toride 取手	3.4 (2.1)	37.4 (23.2)	○	●	●	●	|	|	■ Jōsō Line	Four	Toride	Ibaraki
Jōban	End of suburban section, boundary of 1,500 V DC (south) and 20 kV 50 Hz AC (north) electrification systems												Toride	Ibaraki
Jōban		Fujishiro 藤代	6.0 (3.7)	43.4 (27.0)		●		●	|	|		Two	Toride	Ibaraki
Jōban		Ryūgasakishi 龍ケ崎市	2.1 (1.3)	45.5 (28.3)		●		●	△	△	■ Ryūgasaki Line (Sanuki)	Two	Ryūgasaki	Ibaraki
Jōban		Ushiku 牛久	5.1 (3.2)	50.6 (31.4)		●		●	△	|		Two	Ushiku	Ibaraki
Jōban		Hitachino-Ushiku ひたち野うしく	3.9 (2.4)	54.5 (33.9)		●		●	△	|		Two	Ushiku	Ibaraki
Jōban		Arakawaoki 荒川沖	2.7 (1.7)	57.2 (35.5)		●		●	△	|		Two	Tsuchiura	Ibaraki
Jōban		Tsuchiura 土浦	6.6 (4.1)	63.8 (39.6)		●		●	●	△		Two	Tsuchiura	Ibaraki
Jōban		Kandatsu 神立	6.1 (3.8)	69.9 (43.4)		●			|	|		Two	Tsuchiura	Ibaraki
Jōban		Takahama 高浜	6.5 (4.0)	76.4 (47.5)		●			|	|		Two	Ishioka	Ibaraki
Jōban		Ishioka 石岡	3.6 (2.2)	80.0 (49.7)		●			●	|		Two	Ishioka	Ibaraki
Jōban		Hatori 羽鳥	6.5 (4.0)	86.5 (53.7)		●			|	|		Two	Omitama	Ibaraki
Jōban		Iwama 岩間	5.4 (3.4)	91.9 (57.1)		●			|	|		Two	Kasama	Ibaraki
Jōban		Tomobe 友部	6.9 (4.3)	98.8 (61.4)		●			●	|	■ Mito Line (some trains through to Mito)	Two	Kasama	Ibaraki
Jōban		Uchihara 内原	4.7 (2.9)	103.5 (64.3)		●			|	|		Two	Mito	Ibaraki
Jōban		Akatsuka 赤塚	5.8 (3.6)	109.3 (67.9)		●			△	|		Two	Mito	Ibaraki
Jōban		Kairakuen 偕楽園	4.1 (2.5)	113.4 (70.5)		●			△	△ (Note: Daytime Mito-bound trains stop here only during the Japanese plum blossom season)		Two	Mito	Ibaraki
Jōban		Mito 水戸	1.9 (1.2)	115.3 (71.6)		●			●	●	■ Suigun Line ■ Kashima Rinkai Railway Ōarai Kashima Line	Two	Mito	Ibaraki
Jōban		Katsuta 勝田	5.8 (3.6)	121.1 (75.2)		●			●	●	■ Minato Line	Two	Hitachinaka	Ibaraki
Jōban		Sawa 佐和	4.2 (2.6)	125.3 (77.9)		●			|	|		Two	Hitachinaka	Ibaraki
Jōban		Tōkai 東海	4.7 (2.9)	130.0 (80.8)		●			△	△		Two	Tōkai, Naka District	Ibaraki
Jōban		Ōmika 大甕	7.4 (4.6)	137.4 (85.4)		●			●	△		Two	Hitachi	Ibaraki
Jōban		Hitachi-Taga 常陸多賀	4.6 (2.9)	142.0 (88.2)		●			●	△		Two	Hitachi	Ibaraki
Jōban		Hitachi 日立	4.9 (3.0)	146.9 (91.3)		●			●	●		Two	Hitachi	Ibaraki
Jōban		Ogitsu 小木津	5.5 (3.4)	152.4 (94.7)		●			|	|		Two	Hitachi	Ibaraki
Jōban		Jūō 十王	4.2 (2.6)	156.6 (97.3)		●			|	|		Two	Hitachi	Ibaraki
Jōban		Takahagi 高萩	5.9 (3.7)	162.5 (101.0)		●			●	△		Two	Takahagi	Ibaraki
Jōban		Minami-Nakagō 南中郷	4.5 (2.8)	167.0 (103.8)		●				|		Two	Kitaibaraki	Ibaraki
Jōban		Isohara 磯原	4.6 (2.9)	171.6 (106.6)		●				△		Two	Kitaibaraki	Ibaraki
Jōban		Ōtsukō 大津港	7.1 (4.4)	178.7 (111.0)		●				|		Two	Kitaibaraki	Ibaraki
Jōban		Nakoso 勿来	4.5 (2.8)	183.2 (113.8)		●				△		Two	Iwaki	Fukushima
Jōban		Ueda 植田	4.6 (2.9)	187.8 (116.7)		●				|		Two	Iwaki	Fukushima
Jōban		Izumi 泉	7.2 (4.5)	195.0 (121.2)		●				●		Two	Iwaki	Fukushima
Jōban		Yumoto 湯本	6.5 (4.0)	201.5 (125.2)		●				●		Two	Iwaki	Fukushima
Jōban		Uchigō 内郷	3.5 (2.2)	205.0 (127.4)		●				|		Two	Iwaki	Fukushima
Jōban		Iwaki いわき	4.4 (2.7)	209.4 (130.1)		●				●	■ Banetsu East Line	Two	Iwaki	Fukushima

=== Iwaki – Iwanuma – Sendai ===
Legend

- Trains stop at stations marked "●" and pass those marked "|"
- Few trains stop at stations marked "△"
- Stations marked "◇" are located on passing loops and allow trains in opposite directions to pass each other
- From Iwanuma to Sendai, the train goes on Tōhoku Main Line tracks.

Line	Station	Distance in km (mi)		Local	Hitachi	Transfers	Tracks	Location	
Line	Station	Between stations	Total (from Nippori)	Local	Hitachi	Transfers	Tracks	Location	
Jōban	Iwaki いわき	—N/a	209.4 (130.1)	●	●	■ Banetsu East Line	Two	Iwaki	Fukushima
Jōban	Kusano 草野	5.4 (3.4)	214.8 (133.5)	●	|		Two	Iwaki	Fukushima
Jōban	Yotsukura 四ツ倉	4.4 (2.7)	219.2 (136.2)	●	|		◇	Iwaki	Fukushima
Jōban	Hisanohama 久ノ浜	4.8 (3.0)	224.0 (139.2)	●	|		◇	Iwaki	Fukushima
Jōban	Suetsugi 末続	3.6 (2.2)	227.6 (141.4)	●	|		◇	Iwaki	Fukushima
Jōban	Hirono 広野	4.8 (3.0)	232.4 (144.4)	●	●		Two	Hirono, Futaba District	Fukushima
Jōban	J-Village; Jヴィレッジ駅	3.5 (2.2)	235.9 (146.6)	●	|		Two	Naraha, Futaba District	Fukushima
Jōban	Kido 木戸	1.9 (1.2)	237.8 (147.8)	●	|		Two	Naraha, Futaba District	Fukushima
Jōban	Tatsuta 竜田	3.1 (1.9)	240.9 (149.7)	●	|		◇	Naraha, Futaba District	Fukushima
Jōban	Tomioka 富岡	6.9 (4.3)	247.8 (154.0)	●	●		◇	Tomioka, Futaba District	Fukushima
Jōban	Yonomori 夜ノ森	5.2 (3.2)	253.0 (157.2)	●	|		◇	Tomioka, Futaba District	Fukushima
Jōban	Ōno 大野	4.9 (3.0)	257.9 (160.3)	●	●		One	Ōkuma, Futaba District	Fukushima
Jōban	Futaba 双葉	5.8 (3.6)	263.7 (163.9)	●	●		One	Futaba, Futaba District	Fukushima
Jōban	Namie 浪江	4.9 (3.0)	268.6 (166.9)	●	●		◇	Namie, Futaba District	Fukushima
Jōban	Momouchi 桃内	4.9 (3.0)	273.5 (169.9)	●	|		◇	Minamisōma	Fukushima
Jōban	Odaka 小高	4.0 (2.5)	277.5 (172.4)	●	|		◇	Minamisōma	Fukushima
Jōban	Iwaki-Ōta 磐城太田	4.9 (3.0)	282.4 (175.5)	●	|		◇	Minamisōma	Fukushima
Jōban	Haranomachi 原ノ町	4.5 (2.8)	286.9 (178.3)	●	●		◇	Minamisōma	Fukushima
Jōban	Kashima 鹿島	7.5 (4.7)	294.4 (182.9)	●	|		◇	Minamisōma	Fukushima
Jōban	Nittaki 日立木	6.7 (4.2)	301.1 (187.1)	●	|		◇	Sōma	Fukushima
Jōban	Sōma 相馬	5.9 (3.7)	307.0 (190.8)	●	●		◇	Sōma	Fukushima
Jōban	Komagamine 駒ヶ嶺	4.4 (2.7)	311.4 (193.5)	●	|		◇	Shinchi, Sōma District	Fukushima
Jōban	Shinchi 新地	4.4 (2.7)	315.8 (196.2)	●	|		◇	Shinchi, Sōma District	Fukushima
Jōban	Sakamoto 坂元	5.4 (3.4)	321.2 (199.6)	●	|		One	Yamamoto, Watari District	Miyagi
Jōban	Yamashita 山下	4.5 (2.8)	325.7 (202.4)	●	|		◇	Yamamoto, Watari District	Miyagi
Jōban	Hamayoshida 浜吉田	3.9 (2.4)	329.6 (204.8)	●	|		◇	Watari, Watari District	Miyagi
Jōban	Watari 亘理	5.0 (3.1)	334.6 (207.9)	●	△		◇	Watari, Watari District	Miyagi
Jōban	Ōkuma 逢隈	3.2 (2.0)	337.8 (209.9)	●	|		◇	Watari, Watari District	Miyagi
Jōban	Iwanuma 岩沼	5.3 (3.3)	343.1 (213.2)	●	△	■ Tōhoku Main Line (for Fukushima)	^	Iwanuma	Miyagi
Tōhoku	Iwanuma 岩沼	5.3 (3.3)	343.1 (213.2)	●	△	■ Tōhoku Main Line (for Fukushima)	^	Iwanuma	Miyagi
Tōhoku	Tatekoshi 館腰	3.7 (2.3)	346.8 (215.5)	●	|	■ Tōhoku Main Line	Two	Natori	Miyagi
Tōhoku	Natori 名取	3.5 (2.2)	350.3 (217.7)	●	|	Sendai Airport Line; ■ Tōhoku Main Line	Two	Natori	Miyagi
Tōhoku	Minami-Sendai 南仙台	2.7 (1.7)	353.0 (219.3)	●	|	Sendai Airport Line; ■ Tōhoku Main Line	Two	Taihaku-ku, Sendai	Miyagi
Tōhoku	Taishidō 太子堂	2.2 (1.4)	355.2 (220.7)	●	|	Sendai Airport Line; ■ Tōhoku Main Line	Two	Taihaku-ku, Sendai	Miyagi
Tōhoku	Nagamachi 長町	1.0 (0.62)	356.2 (221.3)	●	|	Sendai Airport Line; ■ Sendai Subway Namboku Line; ■ Tōhoku Main Line	Two	Taihaku-ku, Sendai	Miyagi
Tōhoku	Sendai 仙台	4.5 (2.8)	360.7 (224.1)	●	●	Tōhoku Shinkansen; Akita Shinkansen; ■ Tohoku Main Line (for Ichinoseki and Rifu); Sendai Airport Line; ■ Senzan Line; ■ Senseki Line; ■ Sendai Subway Namboku Line; ■ Sendai Subway Tōzai Line	Two	Aoba-ku, Sendai	Miyagi

== Rolling stock ==
=== Local / Rapid service stock ===
==== Shinagawa – Ueno – Iwaki ====
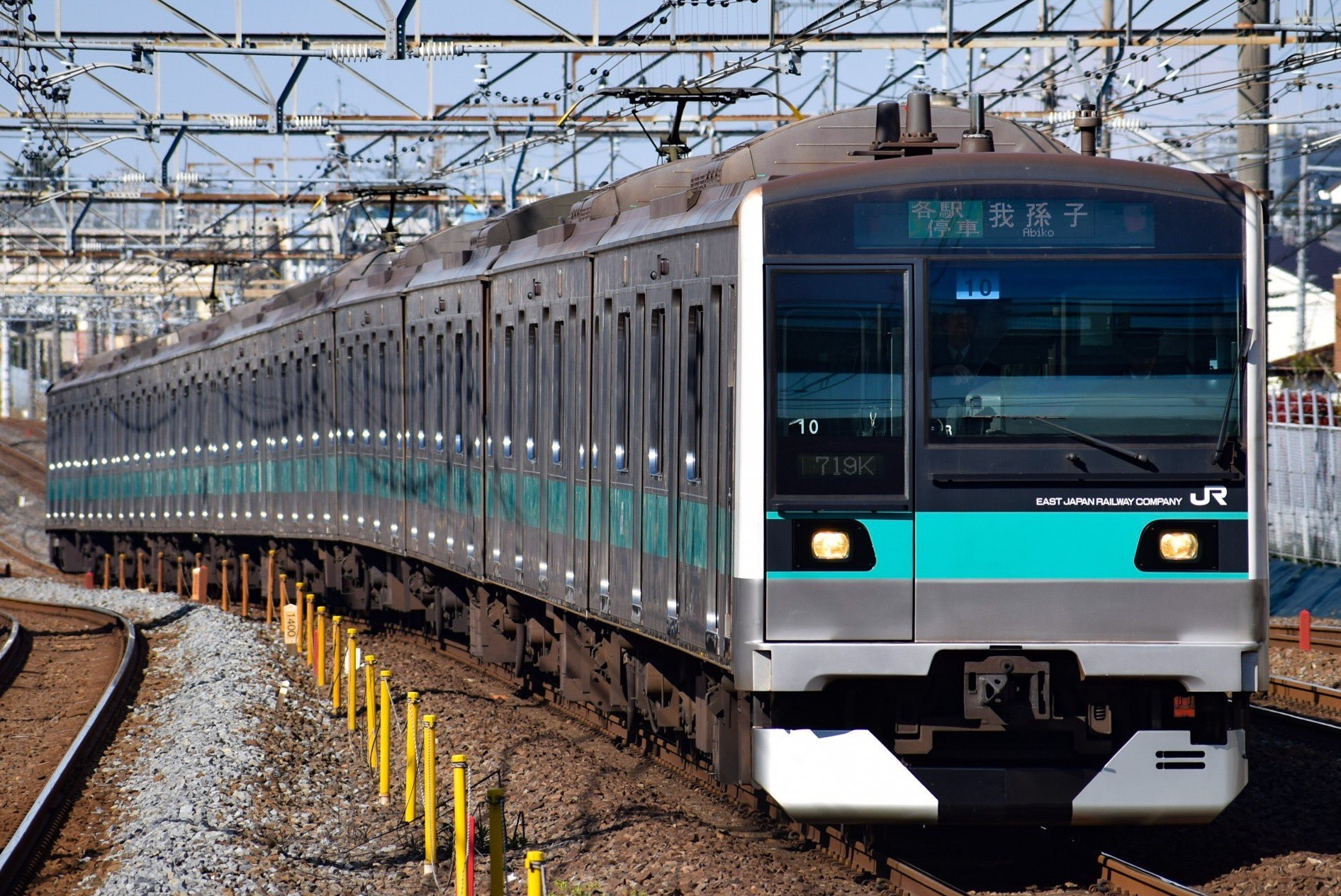
A JR East E233-2000 series train

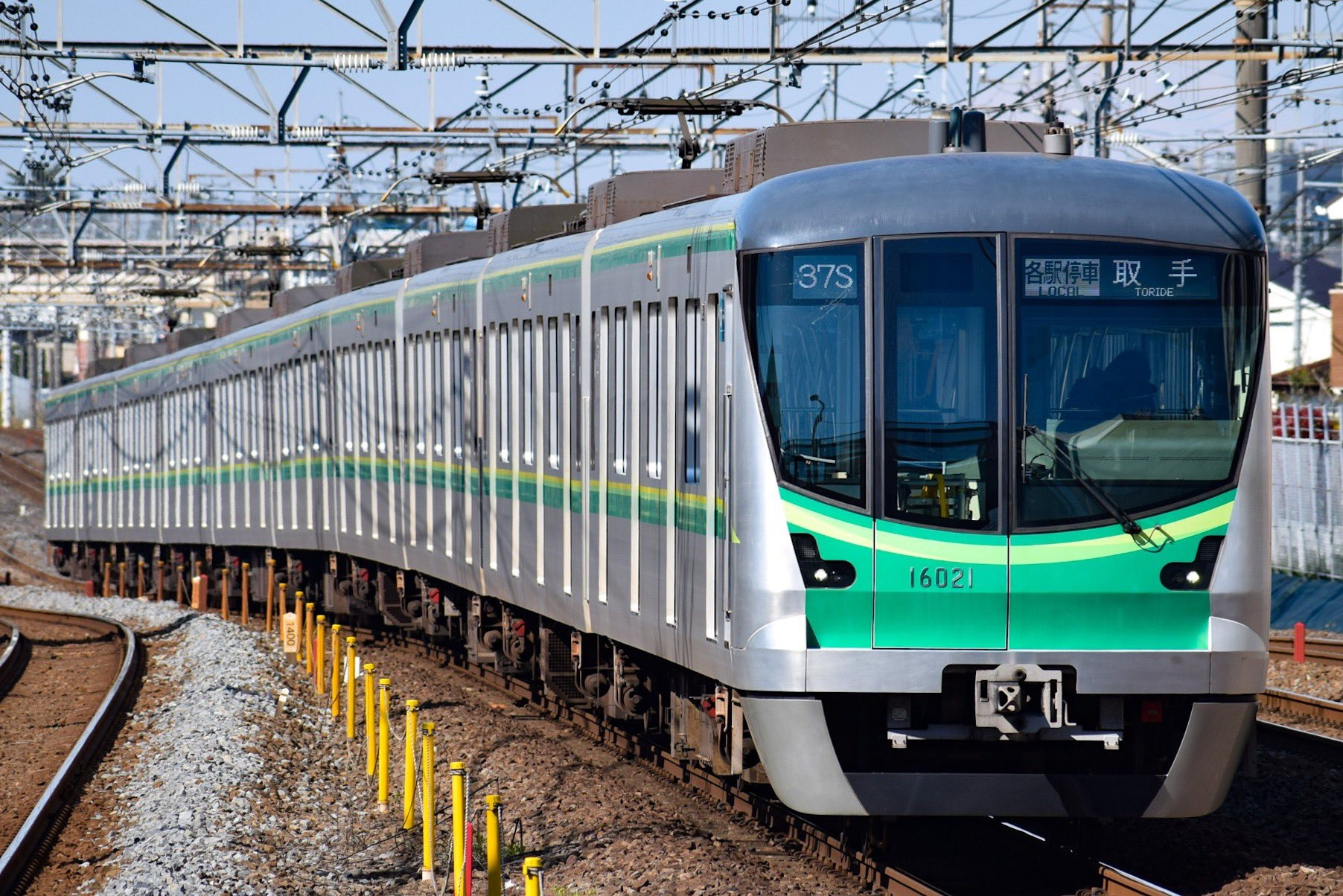
A Tokyo Metro 16000 series train

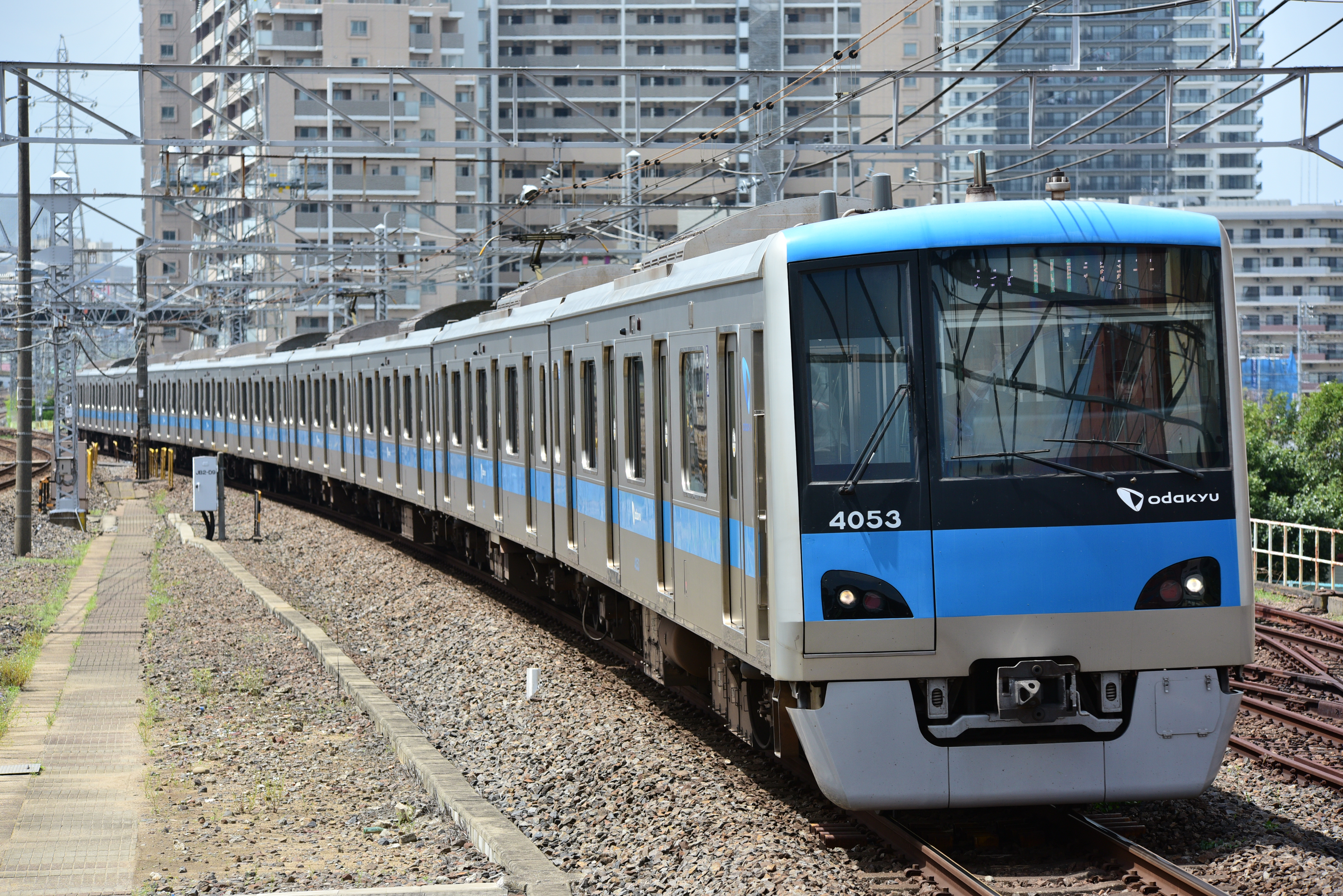
An Odakyu 4000 series train

- Jōban Line (Local)
  - JR East stock
    - E233-2000 series (x19) 10-car EMUs
  - Tokyo Metro stock
    - Tokyo Metro 16000 series (x37) 10-car EMUs
  - Odakyu stock
    - Odakyu 4000 series

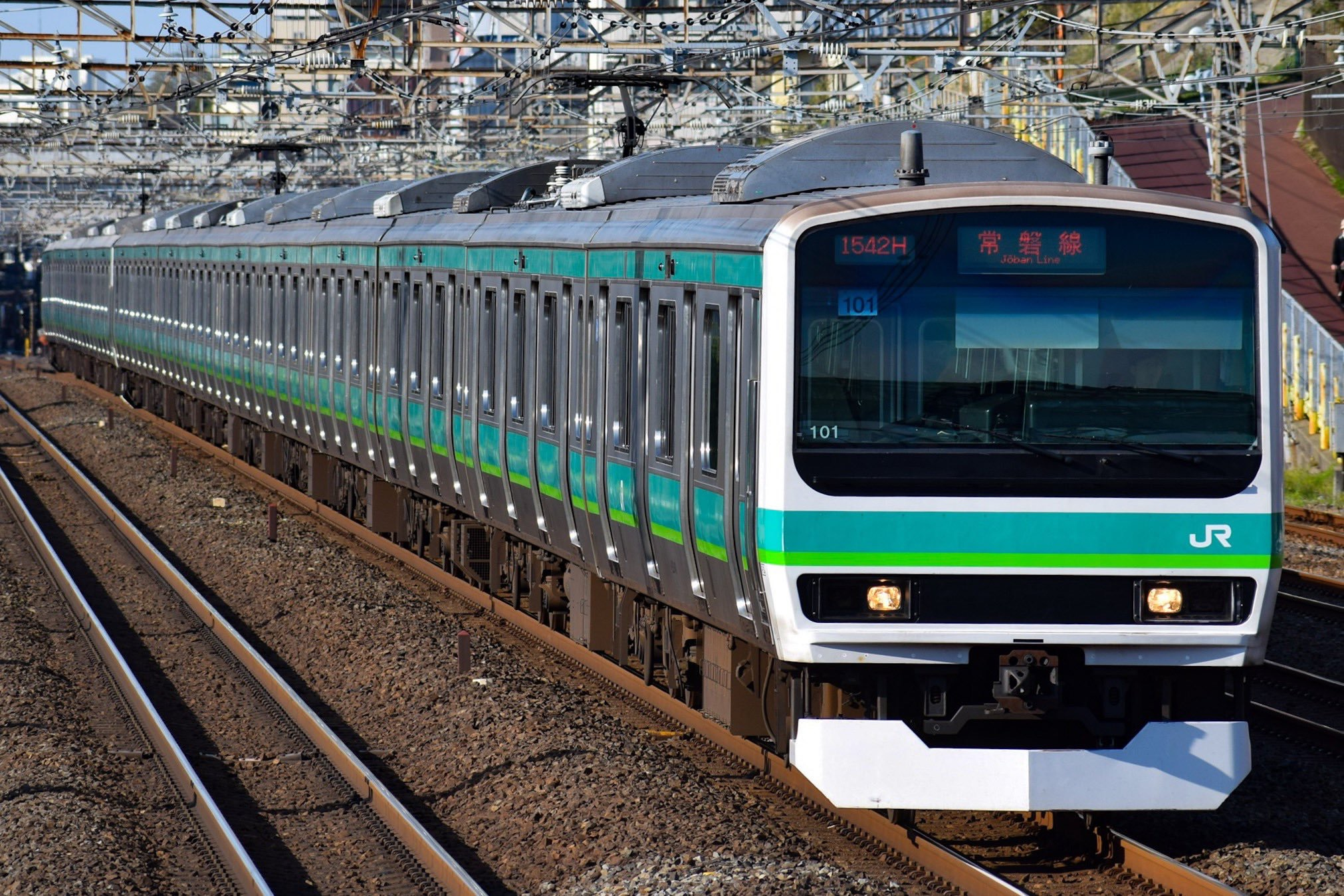
A Joban Line E231 series EMU, July 2019

- Jōban Line (Rapid)
  - E231-0 series 10+5-car EMUs

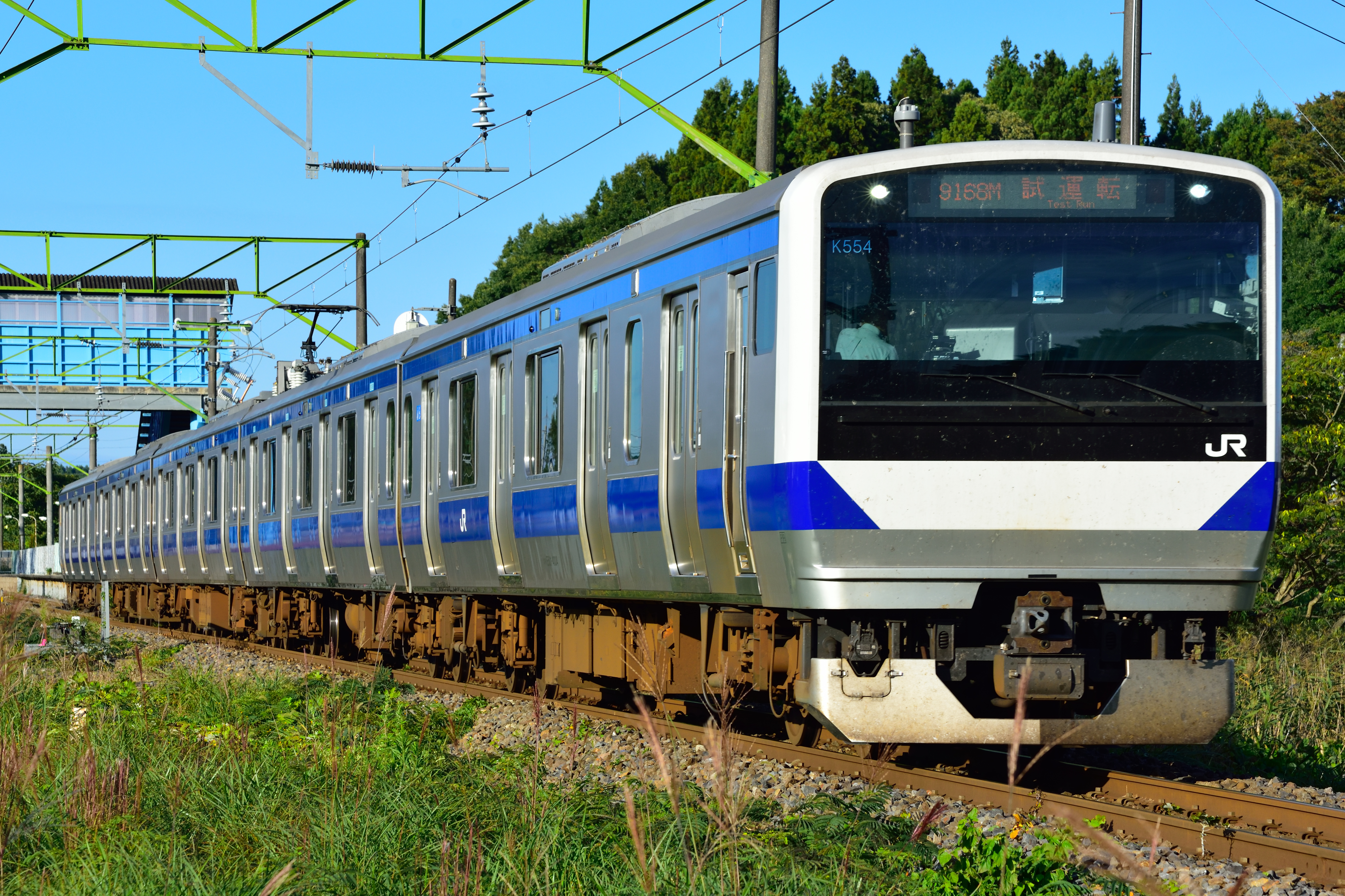
An E531 series EMU, October 2017

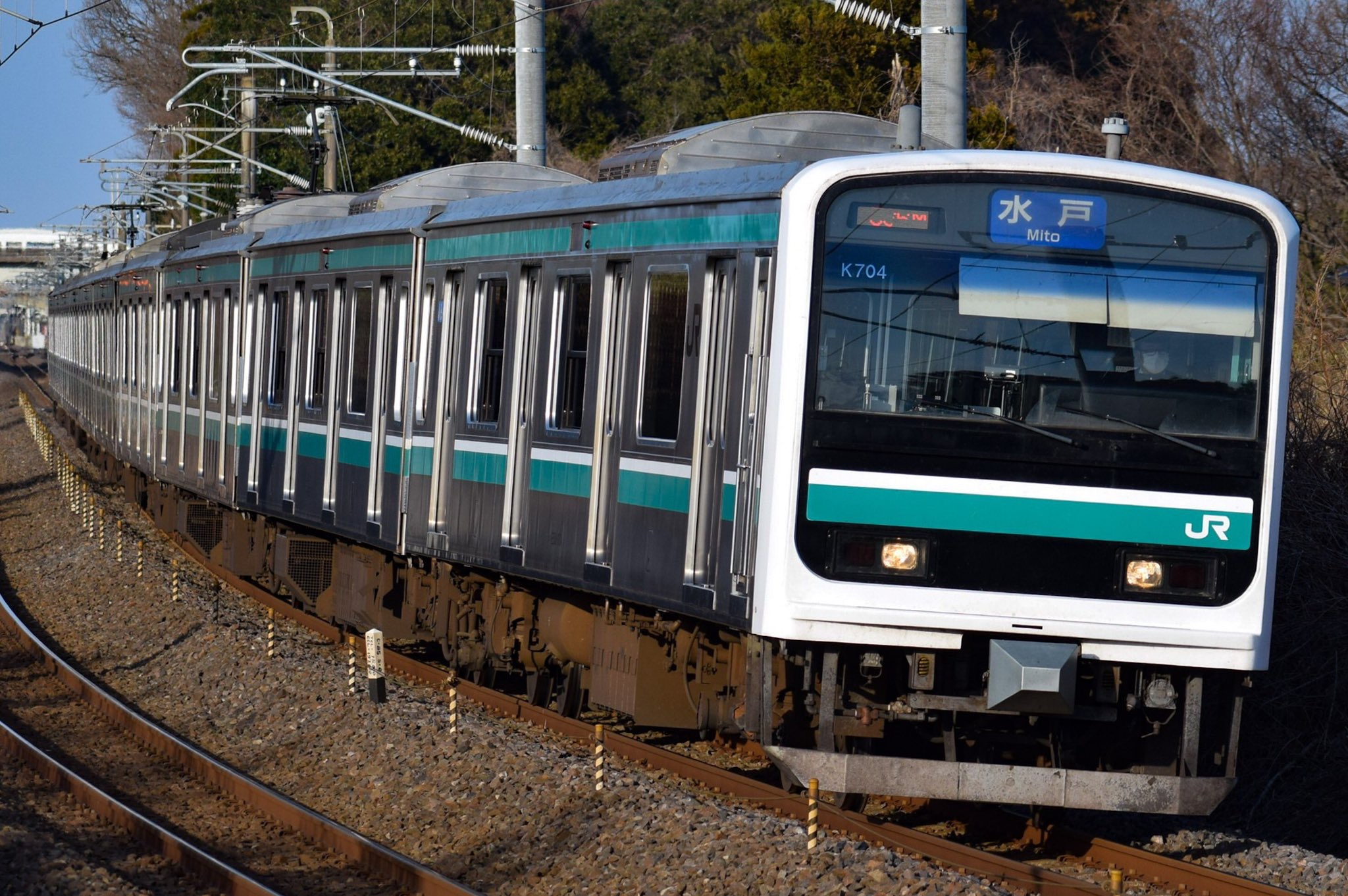
An E501 series EMU, April 2019

- Jōban Line
  - E501 series 10 and 5 car EMUs (Operates only between Tsuchiura and Kusano)
  - E531 series 10 and 5-car EMUs (can run as 15 car configuration as far as Tsuchiura station)

==== Iwaki – Sendai ====
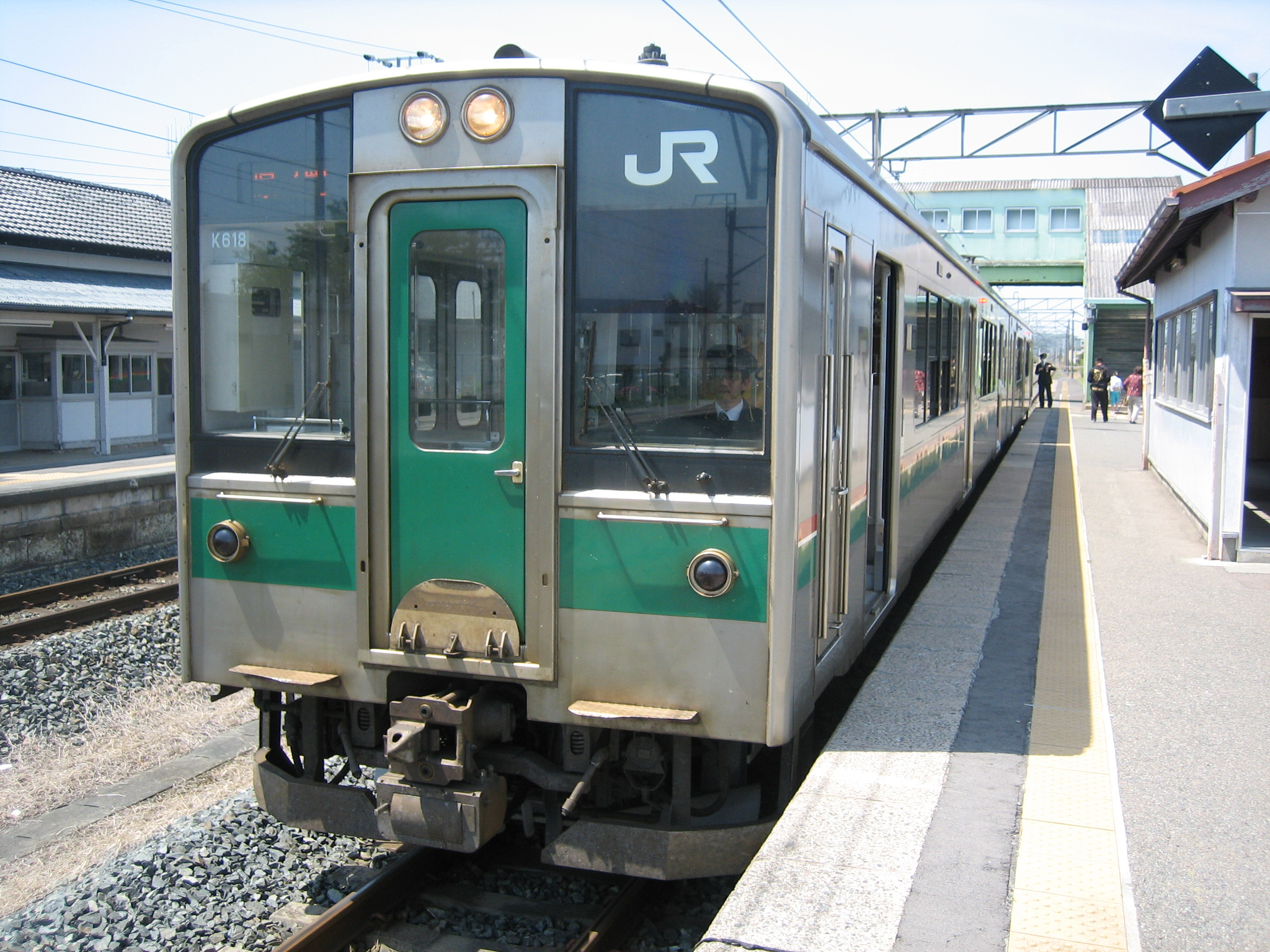
A JR East 701 series train at Kashima Station, May 2014

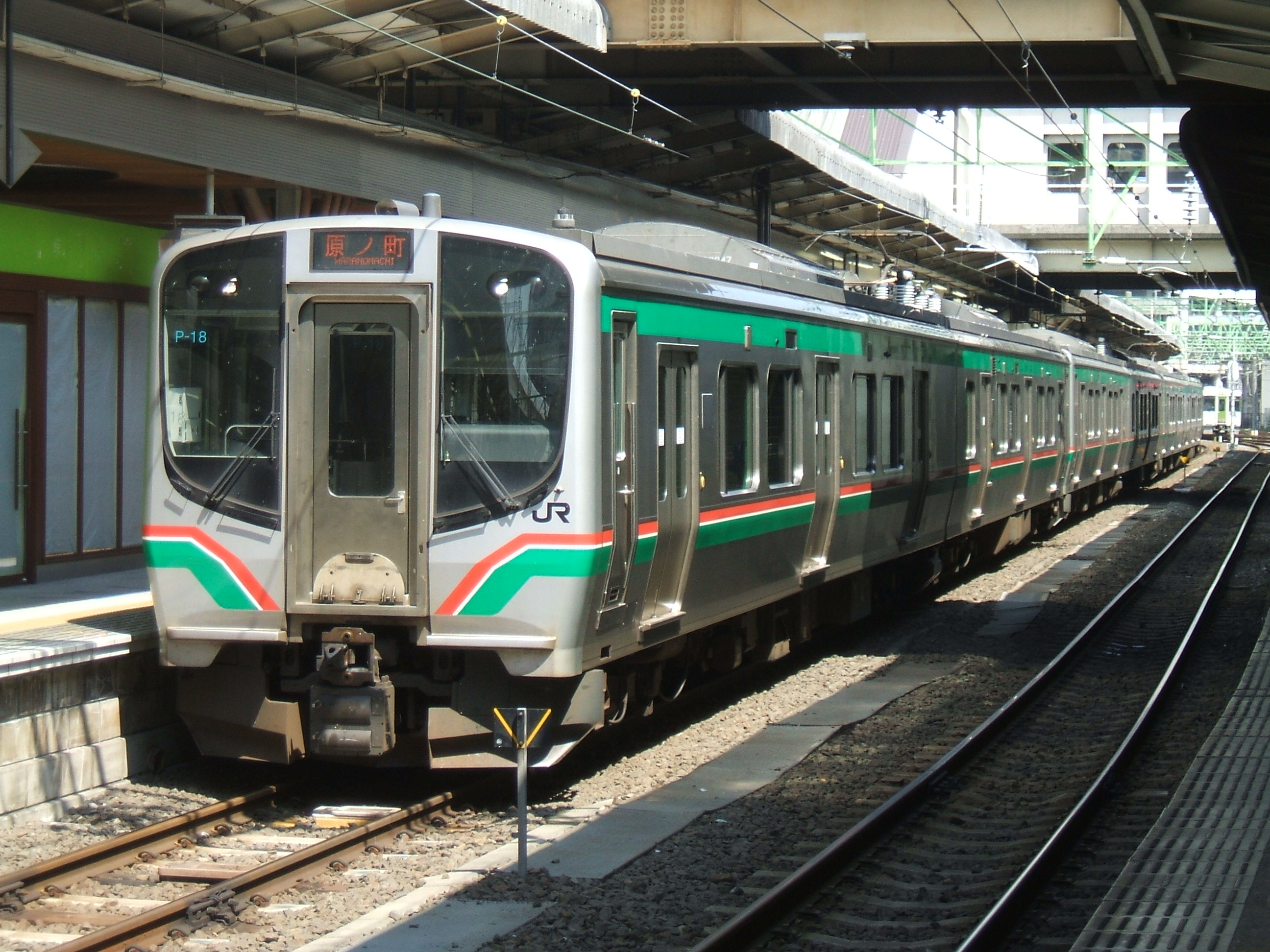
A JR East E721 series train at Sendai Station, August 2010

- 701 series
- 719 series
- E531 series
- E721 series

=== Limited express stock ===
- E657 series 10-car EMUs (Hitachi/Tokiwa services) (from 17 March 2012)

=== Past ===
- Kiha 58 DMUs (Tokiwa and Okukuji rapid services) (through services to Suigun Line) (until March 1985)
- 80 series EMUs (Hitachi services) (from October 1969 until October 1972)
- 401 series EMUs (cream with blue stripe) (from June 1961 until 1987)
- 485 series EMUs (Hitachi services) (from October 1972 until December 1998)
- 103 series 10+5-car EMUs (emerald green livery) (from December 1967 until March 2006)
- 103-1000 series 10-car EMUs (Tokyo Metro Chiyoda Line through-running services, sea green stripe) (from 1971 until April 1986)
- 403 series/415 series 7+4+4-car EMUs (cream with blue stripe) (from 1965 until March 2007)
- 207–900 series 10-car EMU (x1) (Tokyo Metro Chiyoda Line through-running services, emerald green stripe) (from 1986 until December 2009)
- 203 series 10-car EMUs (Tokyo Metro Chiyoda Line through-running services, emerald green stripe) (from 1982 until 26 September 2011)
- 415–1500 series 4-car EMUs (blue stripe) (from 1986 until 2016)
- 651 series 7+4-car EMUs (x9) (Hitachi services) (from March 1989 until March 2015)
- E653 series 7+4-car EMUs (Fresh Hitachi services) (from October 1997 until March 2013)
- 209–1000 series 10-car EMUs (from 1999 until 13 October 2018)
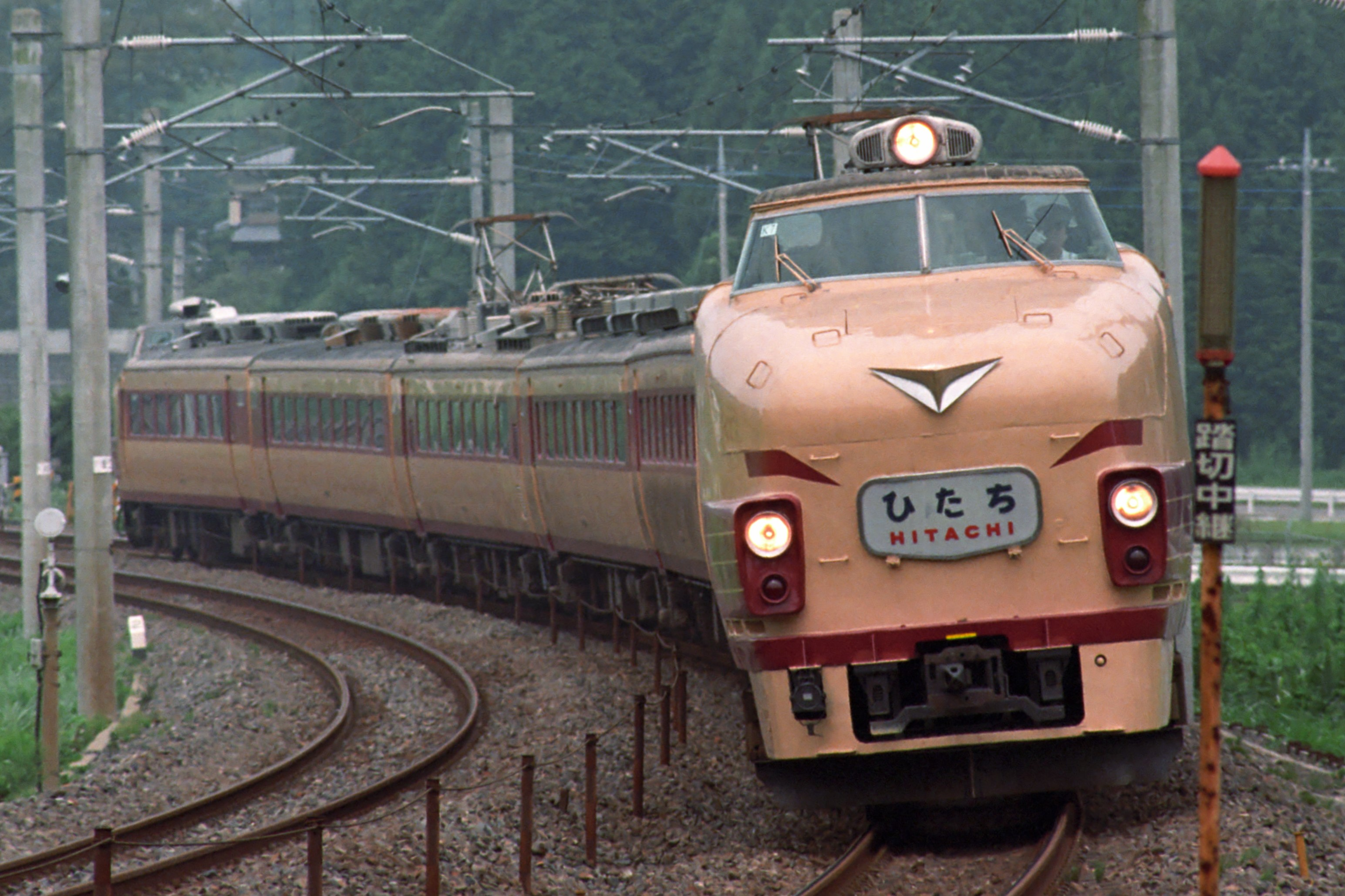
A 485 series EMU on a Hitachi service, August 1998

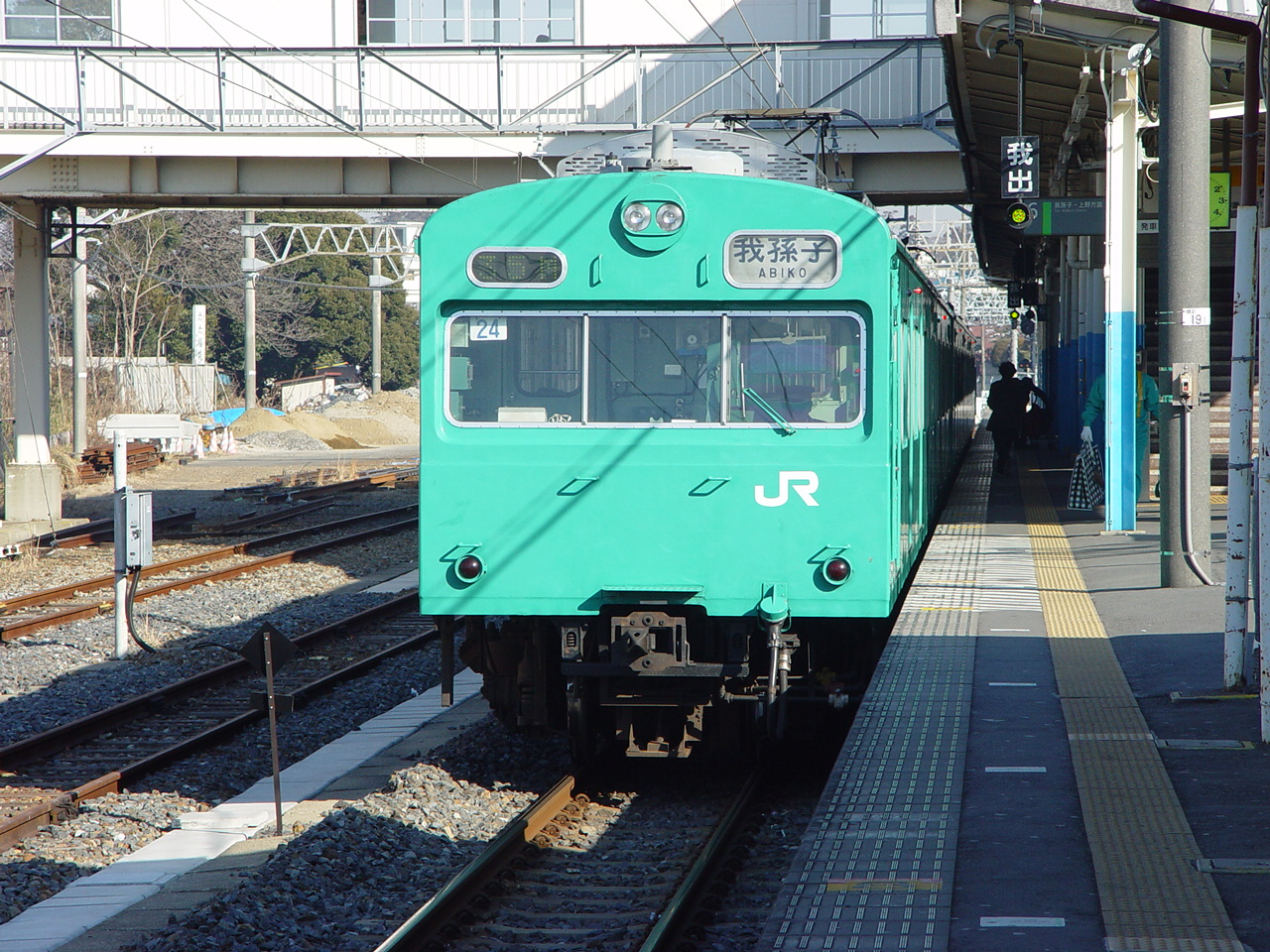
A Joban Line 103 series EMU, January 2003

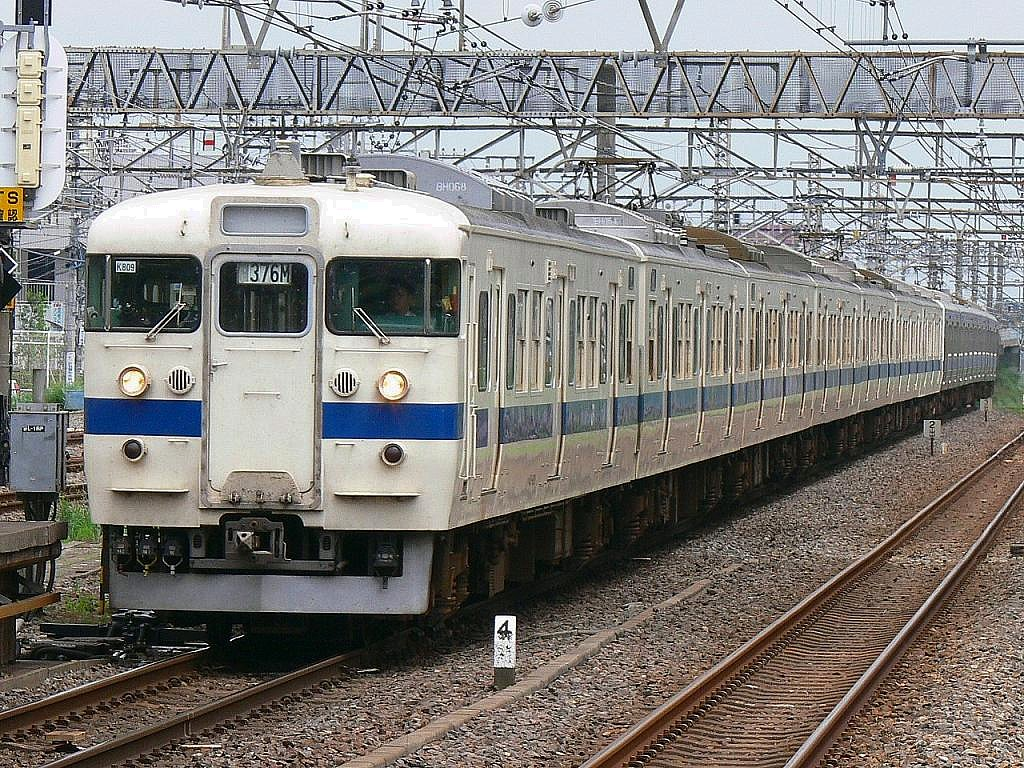
A Joban Line 415 series EMU, July 2006

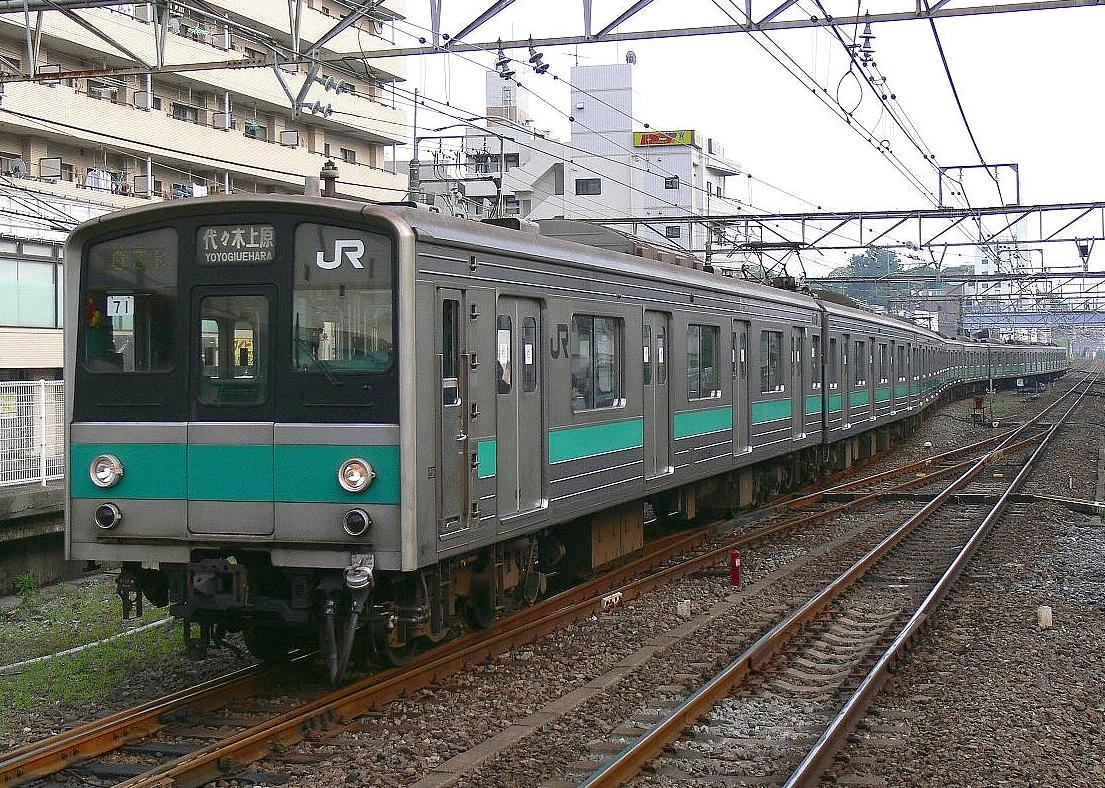
The sole 207–900 series EMU, May 2006

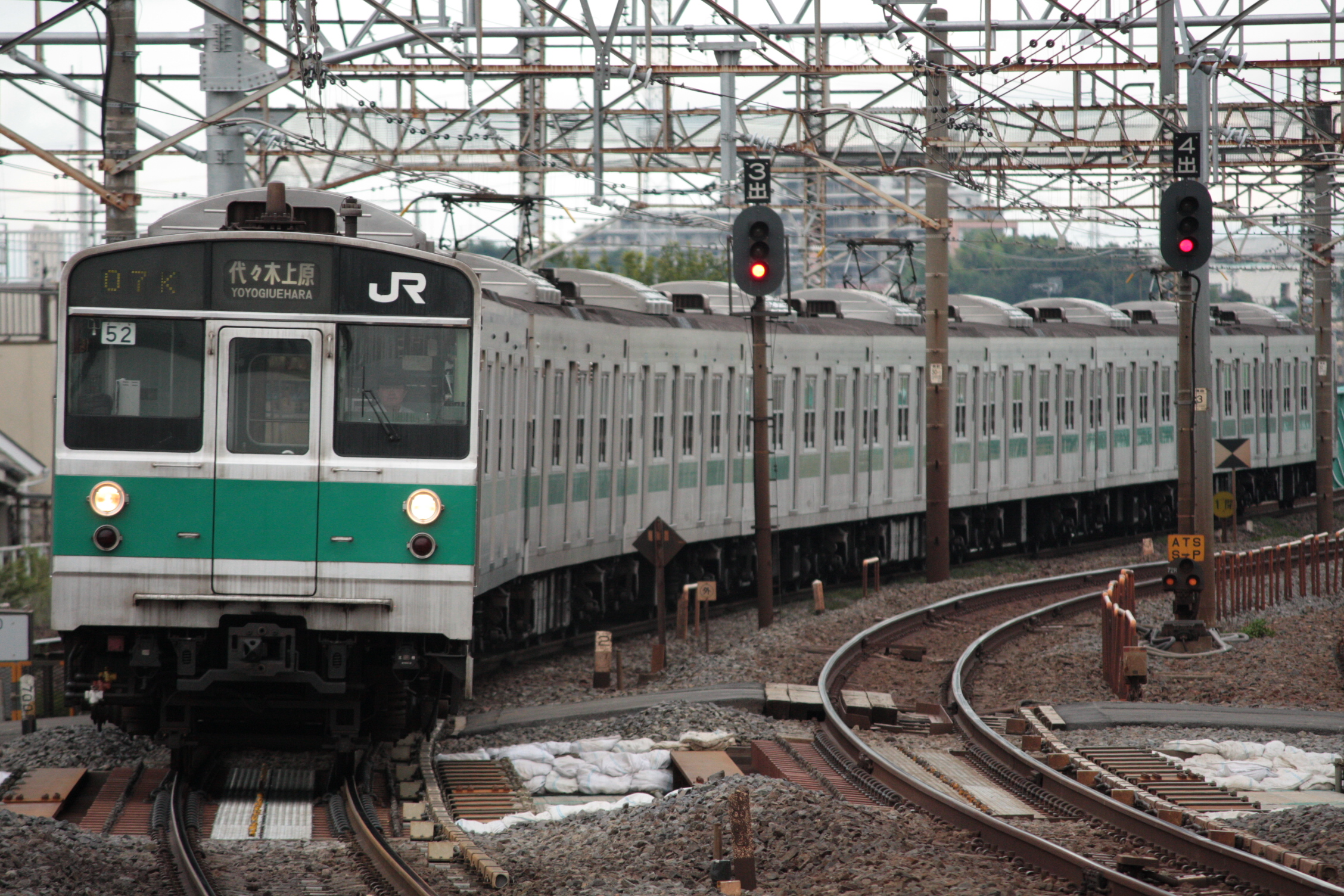
A 203 series EMU, July 2009

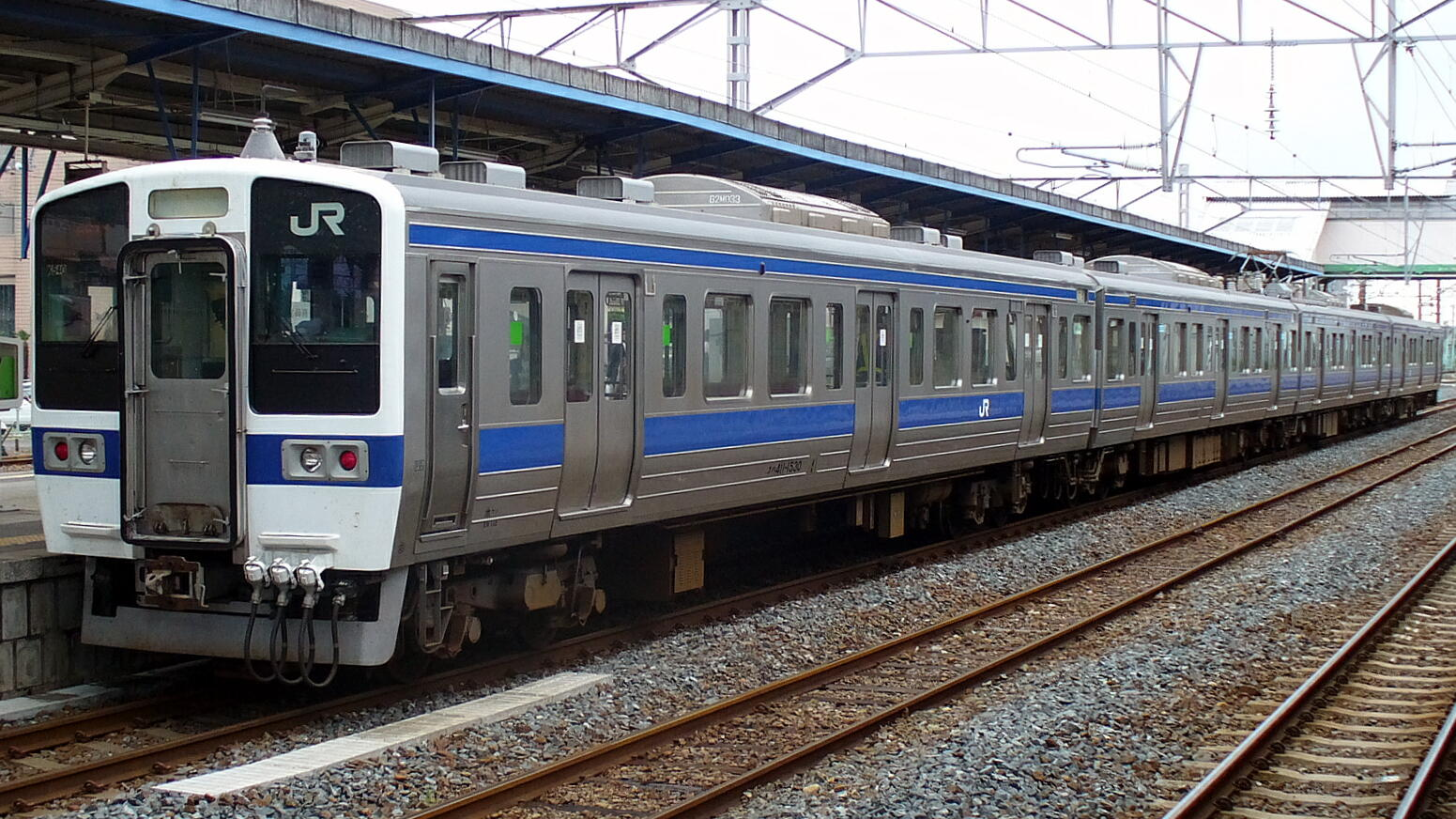
A 415–1500 series EMU in September 2007

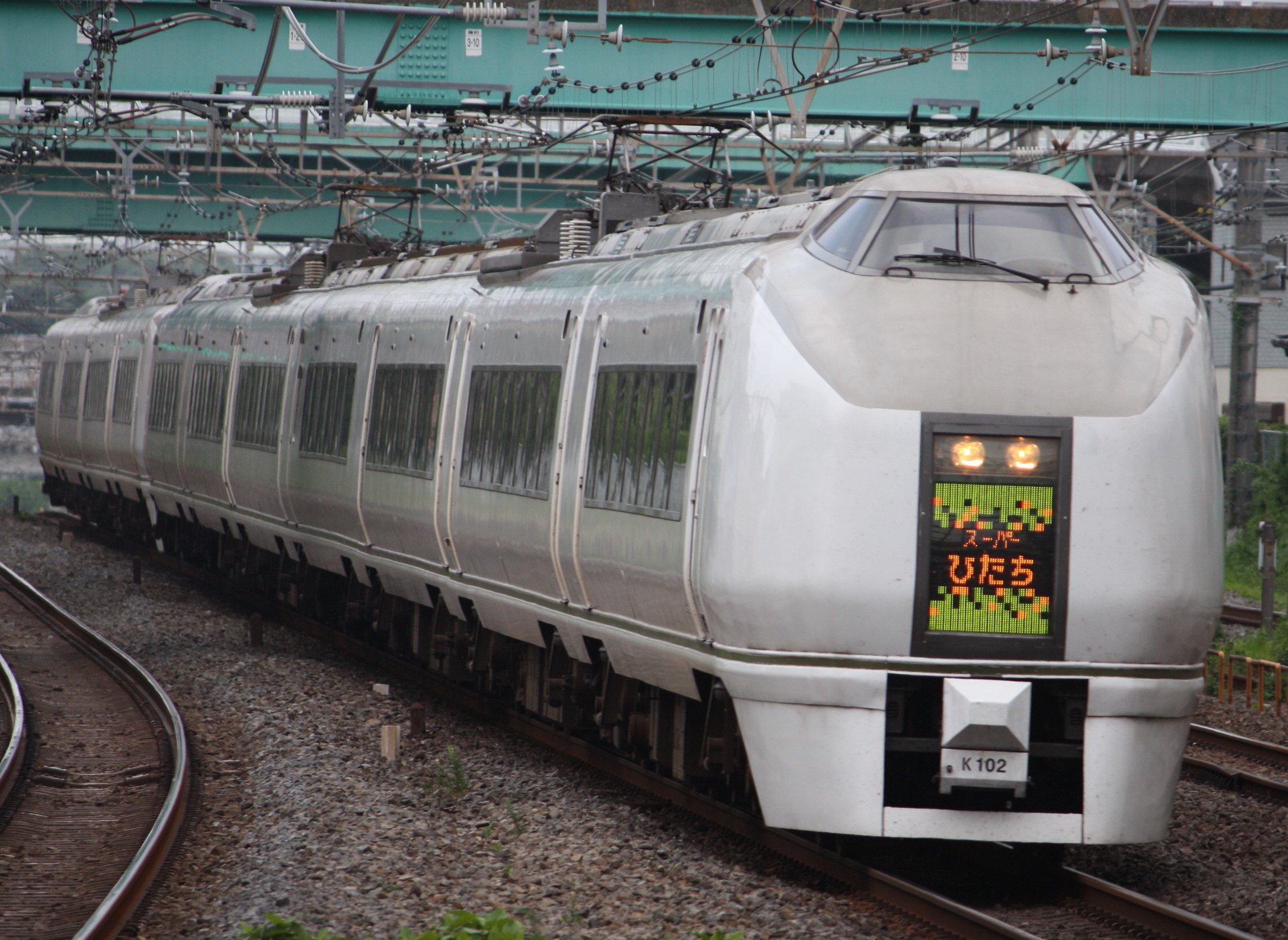
A 651 series EMU on a Super Hitachi service, July 2008

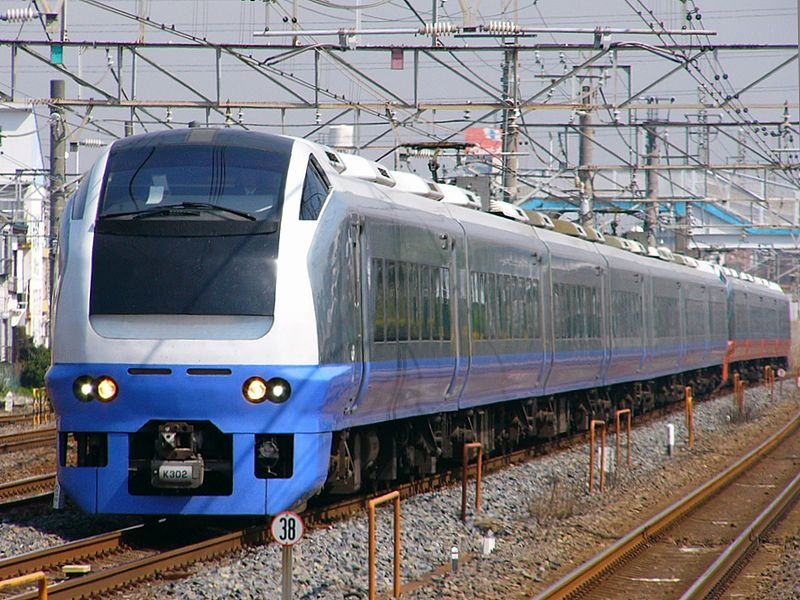
An E653 series EMU on a Fresh Hitachi service, April 2003

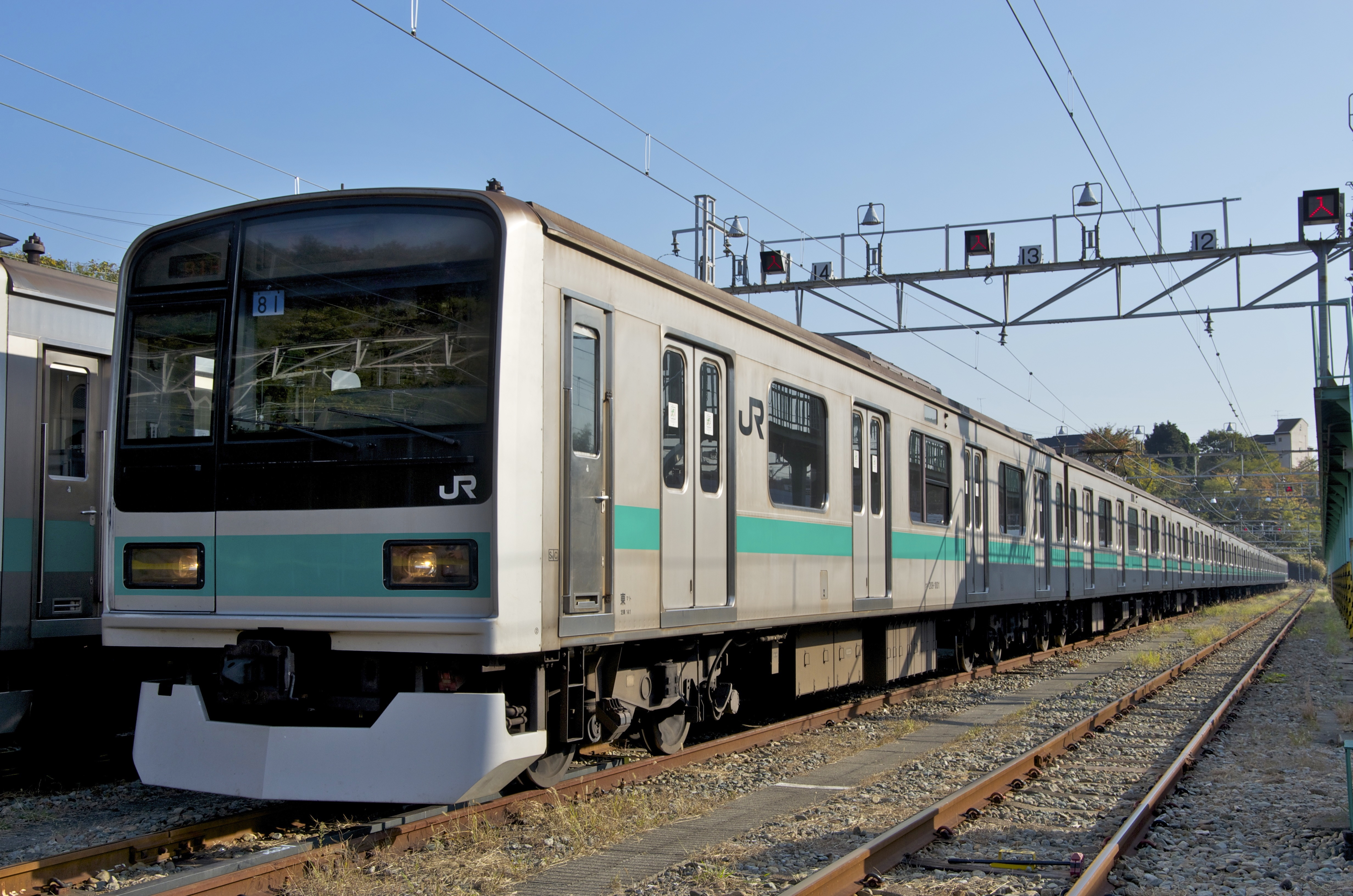
A Joban Line 209–1000 series EMU, November 2011

== History ==
The Mito Railway opened the line in sections between 1889 and 1905. The dates of the individual section openings are given below. After the line was nationalised in 1906, a program of double-tracking commenced in 1910, with the 219 km (136 mi) section between Nippori and Yotsukura completed in 1925. The Hirono - Kido and Ono - Futaba sections were double-tracked in 1976.

The first section electrified was Nippori - Matsudo (at 1,500 V DC) in 1936, and extended to Toride in 1949. The Toride - Kusano section was electrified at 20 kV AC between 1961 and 1963, and extended to Iwanuma in 1967.

The 2011 Tōhoku earthquake and tsunami caused severe disruption to the line, with services to Iwaki (209.4 km (130.1 mi) from Nippori) re-established by 17 April, to Yotsukura (a further 9.8 km (6.1 mi)) by 14 May, and to Hirono (another 13.2 km (8.2 mi)) by 10 October 2011. Services on the 8.5 km (5.3 mi) Hirono - Tatsuta section returned on 1 June 2014.

At the northern end, services on the isolated 20.1 km (12.5 mi) Haranomachi - Soma section were restored on 21 December 2011, with services from Iwanuma to Hamayoshida (219 km (136 mi)) restored on 16 March 2013. Services resumed on the 9.4 km (5.8 mi) Haranomachi - Odaka section on 12 July 2016 and the 22.6 km (14.0 mi) Hamayoshida - Soma section was rebuilt at a higher, tsunami-proof level, and reopened on 10 December 2016, re-establishing the connection to Sendai for stations north of Odaka. The line fully reopened on 14 March 2020.

=== Chronology ===
- 16 January 1889: Mito Railway (Mito — Oyama) begins operation.
- 26 November 1890: Mito Railway Freight Line (Mito — Nakagawa) begins operation.
- 1 March 1892: Mito Railway becomes part of the Nippon Railway.
- 4 November 1895: Nippon Railway Tsuchiura Line (Tsuchiura — Tomobe) begins operation.
- 1 December 1895: Hatori Station opens.
- 25 December 1896: Tsuchiura Line (Tabata — Tsuchiura), Sumidagawa Line (Tabata — Sumidagawa) begin operation.
- 25 February 1897: Iwaki Line (Mito — Taira [present-day Iwaki]) begins operation.
- 17 May 1897: Tsuchiura Line Kameari Station opens.
- 29 August 1897: Iwaki Line (Taira — Kunohama) begins operation.
- 10 November 1897: Iwaki Line (Nakamura [present-day Sōma] — Iwanuma) begins operation.
- 27 December 1897: Tsuchiura Line Kanamachi Station opens.
- January 1898: Kitasenju — Sumidagawa connection opens.
- 1 April 1898: Ishigami Station opens.
- 3 April 1898: Iwaki Line (Haranomachi — Nakamura) begins operation.
- 11 May 1898: Iwaki Line (Odaka — Haranomachi) begins operation.
- 6 August 1898: Tsuchiura Line Mabashi Station opens.
- 23 August 1898: Iwaki Line (Kunohama — Odaka) begins operation, connecting Tabata and Iwanuma. Tsuchiura Line and Mito Line (Tomobe — Mito) and Iwaki Line are collectively renamed the Kaigan Line.
- 1 December 1898: Taka Station is renamed Iwaki-Ōta Station.
- 4 August 1900: Sanuki Station opens.
- 22 November 1904: Ōno Station opens.
- 1 April 1905: With the completion of the Mikawashima — Nippori connection, the present-day route is finished. Nippori and Mikawashima Stations open. Service from Ueno to Tabata and back is abolished.
- 1 November 1906: Nippon Railway is nationalized.
- 25 March 1909: Tatsuta Station opens.
- 12 October 1909: Kaigan Line split and renamed: Jōban Line (Nippori — Iwanuma) and Sumidagawa Line (Tabata — Sumidagawa). Jōban Line also handles freight services.
- 16 February 1910: Minami-Nakagō Station opens.
- 18 March 1910: Katsuta and Ogitsu Stations open.
- 1 May 1911: Kita-Kogane Station opens.
- 5 May 1911: Sumidagawa Line is merged into the Jōban Line.
- 1 June 1915: Yoshida Station is renamed Hamayoshida Station.
- 15 March 1921: Yonomori Station opens.
- 15 August 1922: Nittaki Station opens.
- 2 February 1925: Kōen-Shimo Station opens, but only operates during the ume blossom-viewing season.
- 28 October 28, 1925: Nippori — Taira connection finished (joined with northern tracks in 1965).
- 11 December 1936: Nippori — Matsudo tracks are electrified.
- 1 October 1939: Shimomago Station is renamed Hitachi-Taga Station.
- 20 October 1939: Sukegawa Station is renamed Hitachi Station.
- 15 February 1944: Momouchi signal box is built between Namie and Odaka.
- 20 February 1944: Suetsugi signal box is built between Kunohama and Hirono.
- 1 June 1947: Suetsugi signal box becomes Suetsugi Station.
- 10 August 1948: Momouchi signal box becomes Momouchi Station.
- 10 May 1949: Shimoyama Station opens.
- 1 June 1949: Matsudo — Toride tracks are electrified.
- 6 July 1949: In what is known as the Shimoyama incident, JNR president at the time, Shimoyama Sadanori, is mysteriously found dead between Kita-Senju and Ayase Stations.
- 10 May 1950: Sekimoto Station is renamed Ōtsukō Station.
- 1 May 1952: Kita-Matsudo Station opens.
- 10 July 1952: Komagamine Station opens.
- 1 October 1953: Minami-Kashiwa Station opens.
- 20 December 1956: Tsuzura Station is renamed Uchigō Station.
- 1 April 1957: Ishigami Station is renamed Tōkai Station.
- 1 June 1958: Semi-express Tokiwa begins operation.
- 10 October 1958: The Limited express Hatsukari begins operation (Ueno — Aomori). It stops at Ueno, Mito, Taira, and Sendai Stations when it runs on the Jōban Line tracks.
- 1 October 1959: Nagatsuka Station is renamed Futaba Station.
- 1 October 1960: Kanayama signal box is built between Tatsuta and Tomioka. Ōkuma signal box is built between Watari and Iwanuma.
- 20 March 1961: Nakamura Station is renamed Sōma Station.
- 1 June 1961: Toride — Katsuta tracks are electrified.
- 3 May 1962: The Mikawashima rail crash happens between Mikawashima and Minami-Senju when an Iwaki-bound passenger train crashes into the wreckage of a crash between a Ueno-bound passenger train and an Ueno-bound freight train. 160 people die and 296 are injured in the incident.
- 1 October 1962: Katsuta — Takahagi tracks are electrified.
- 1 May 1963: Takahagi — Taira tracks are electrified.
- 20 April 1963: Takahira signal box is built between Haranomachi and Kashima.
- 30 September 1963: Taira — Kusano tracks are electrified.
- 5 March 1966: Tokiwa semi-express becomes an express.
- 1 February 1967: Kōen-Shimo Station is renamed Kairakuen Station.
- 20 August 1967: With the electrification of the Kusano — Iwanuma tracks, the entire Jōban Line becomes electrified.
- 1 October 1968: Hatsukari express is rerouted to the Tōhoku Main Line.
- 1 October 1969: Kairakuen Station becomes a temporary station. Seasonal Hitachi express begins operation.
- 10 April 1970: Freight line Kita-Kashiwa Station opens.
- 1 October 1970: Hitachi operates as a regular express.
- 20 April 1971: Construction of the Kita-Senju — Abiko Joban Local Line is finished and runs through service to the Eidan Subway Chiyoda Line (present-day Tokyo Metro Chiyoda Line). (The Chiyoda Line only ran as far as Kasumigaseki at the time). Tennōdai Station opens and Kita-Kashiwa Station is open to passengers.
- 1 April 1973: Shin-Matsudo Station opens.
- 31 March 1978: With the extension of its tracks to Yoyogi-Uehara Station, the Chiyoda Line commences through-service with the Odakyu Odawara Line up to Hon-Atsugi Station. 203 series trains are introduced to run through service to the Chiyoda Line.
- 15 November 1982: Jōban Line Local Service extended from Abiko — Toride.
- 1 February 1984: Mito — Nakagawa freight line is closed.
- 14 March 1985: Bampaku-Chūō Station is temporarily opened (until September 16) for the Tsukuba Expo '85. The Uchigō-System-Ku is abolished. The Tokiwa express is discontinued.
- 1 April 1987: With the split of JNR, the Joban Line becomes part of JR East.
- 2 August 1988: Ōkuma signal box becomes Ōkuma Station.
- 11 March 1989: 651 series Super Hitachi limited-express EMUs enter service.
- 1 February 1993: Kanayama signal box is abolished.
- 10 February 1993: Takahira signal box is abolished.
- 3 December 1994: Taira Station is renamed Iwaki Station.
- 1 December 1995: E501 series begins service between Ueno and Tsuchiura.
- 1 October 1997: E653 series Fresh Hitachi limited-express EMUs enter service.
- 14 March 1998: Hitachino-Ushiku Station opens where Bampaku-Chūō Station used to stand.
- 7 December 1998: 485 series Hitachi limited-express EMUs are retired.
- 3 March 2002: New E231 series EMUs introduced on commuter services.
- 13 March 2004: Kawajiri Station is renamed Jūō Station. Regular trains begin making stops at Mikawashima and Minami-Senju Stations throughout the day.
- 16 October 2004: Medium-distance trains are called rapid trains for the section between Ueno and Toride.
- 9 July 2005: New E531 series dual-voltage EMUs enter service on line. Special Rapid Service begins between Ueno — Tsuchiura. Commuter Rapid service from Ueno ends. One Commuter Rapid service still runs from Mito to Ueno.
- 17 March 2006: All Commuter Rapid Service ends.
- 15 May 2006: Women-only cars introduced on Joban Local Line trains [7:10 – 9:30 AM measured by the time the trains pass through Ayase station] from Toride running through to Yoyogi-Uehara on the Tokyo Metro Chiyoda Line.
- 6 January 2007: Double-deck Green cars are phased in on E531 series EMUs running between Ueno and Takahagi. No Green car supplement is required until the start of the new timetable on 2007-03-18.
- 21 February 2007: E501 series EMUs removed from Ueno – Tsuchiura services.
- 18 March 2007: Full Green car service commences on E531 series EMUs running between Ueno and Takahagi; E501 series EMUs reassigned to Mito Line and Jōban services north of Tsuchiura become 10-car or 5-car formations only
- 15 March 2008: Suica use extended to stations between Hitachi and Takahagi
- 14 March 2009: Suica use extended to Takahagi – Iwaki and Haranomachi – Yamashita sections
- 9 September 2009: E233 series 10-car EMUs introduced on Chiyoda Line through services
- 11 March 2011: During the 2011 Tōhoku earthquake and tsunami, a 4-car train on the line was picked up off the tracks by the tsunami surge and overturned at Shinchi and Tomioka stations. All passengers from the train were evacuated before the tsunami came ashore. Tomioka was affected by the Fukushima nuclear disaster and was prohibited entrance without legal permission.
- 8 January 2014: Thales is selected to design Japan's first communications-based train control system (CBTC) on the line.
- May 2014: Test-running commenced on the section of the line between Hirono and Tatsuta stations closed since the March 2011 earthquake and tsunami, with the intention of resuming passenger services on this section from 1 June.
- 1 June 2014: Train operations resumed between Hirono and Tatsuta.
- 12 July 2016: Train operations were resumed between Odaka and Haranomachi stations in Minami-Soma, Fukushima Prefecture.
- 20 August 2016: Station numbering introduced with Rapid services being assigned station numbers between JJ01 (Tokyo) and JJ24 (Toride). Station numbers were also assigned to local services between Ayase (JL19) and Toride (JL32).
- 10 December 10, 2016: The 23 km (14 mi) reconstructed section between Soma and Hamayoshida reopened.
- 1 April 2017: Train services from Odaka south to Namie resumed.
- 21 October 2017: Train services resumed north from Tatsuta to Tomioka.
- 14 March 2020: The section between Tomioka and Namie reopens 9 years after the 2011 Tōhoku earthquake and tsunami reconstruction, bringing the full line back to service.
- 13 March 2021 (planned): Automatic train operation will be activated on the Jōban Line (Local) between Ayase and Toride using the STO (Semi-Automatic) standard.
- 12 March 2022: The number of direct trains on the Ueno Tokyo Line and Joban Line during the day increases to three per hour. During the daytime hours, the direct train operation between Shinagawa / Ueno and Mito is separated at Tsuchiura Station. Along with this, trains in the direction of Ueno and Mito at Tsuchiura Station will be connected at the same platform.
- 16 March 2022: Due to the 2022 Fukushima earthquake, a part of the platform was damaged at Nittaki Station in Soma City, and a part of the bridge between Kashima and Haranomachi in Minamisoma City was several tens of centimeters from the base. Confirmed damage such as misalignment. Hirono-Iwanuma will be suspended from driving.
- 18 March 2022: Yamashita-Resumed operation between Iwanuma.
- 21 March 2022: Resumed operation between Hirono-Tomioka and Shinchi-Yamashita.
- 22 March 2022: Resumed operation between Tomioka and Haranomachi.
- 24 March 2022: Haranomachi-Resumed operation between Shinchi and resumed operation on all lines.

=== Former connecting lines ===
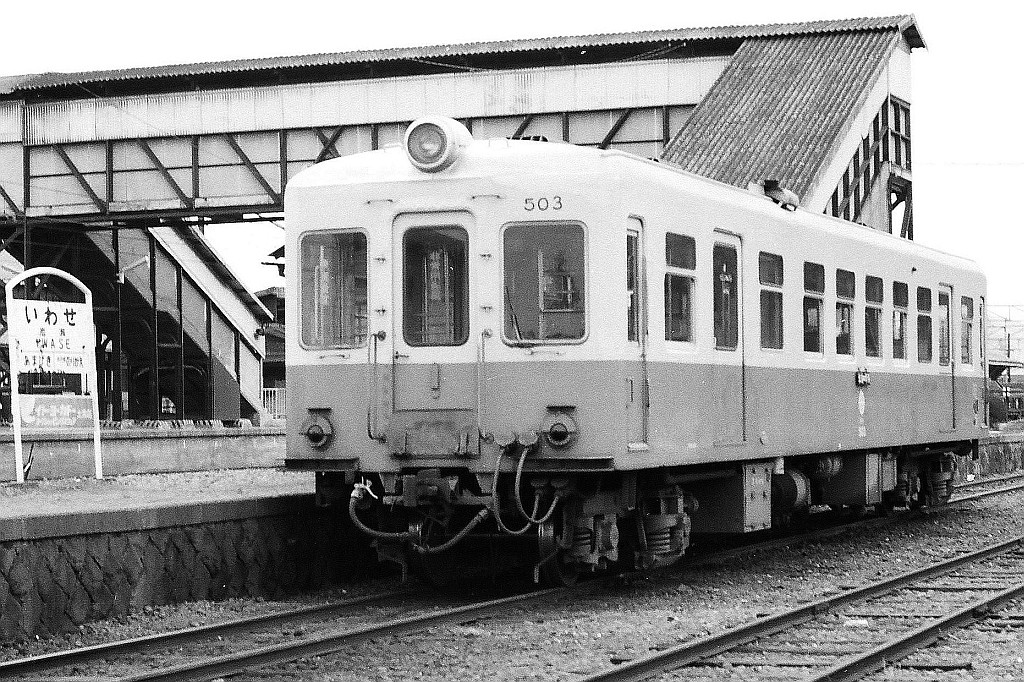
Tsukuba Railway train at Iwase station

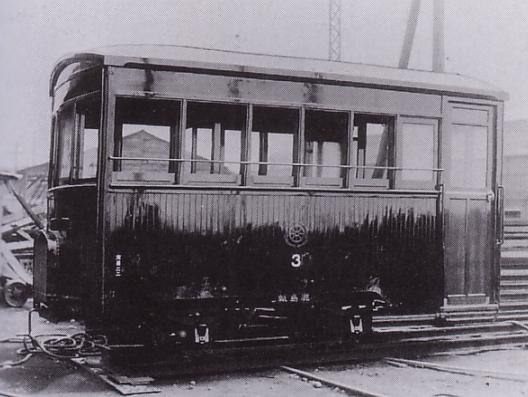
Kashima Light Railway RM3 (see Mito station entry)

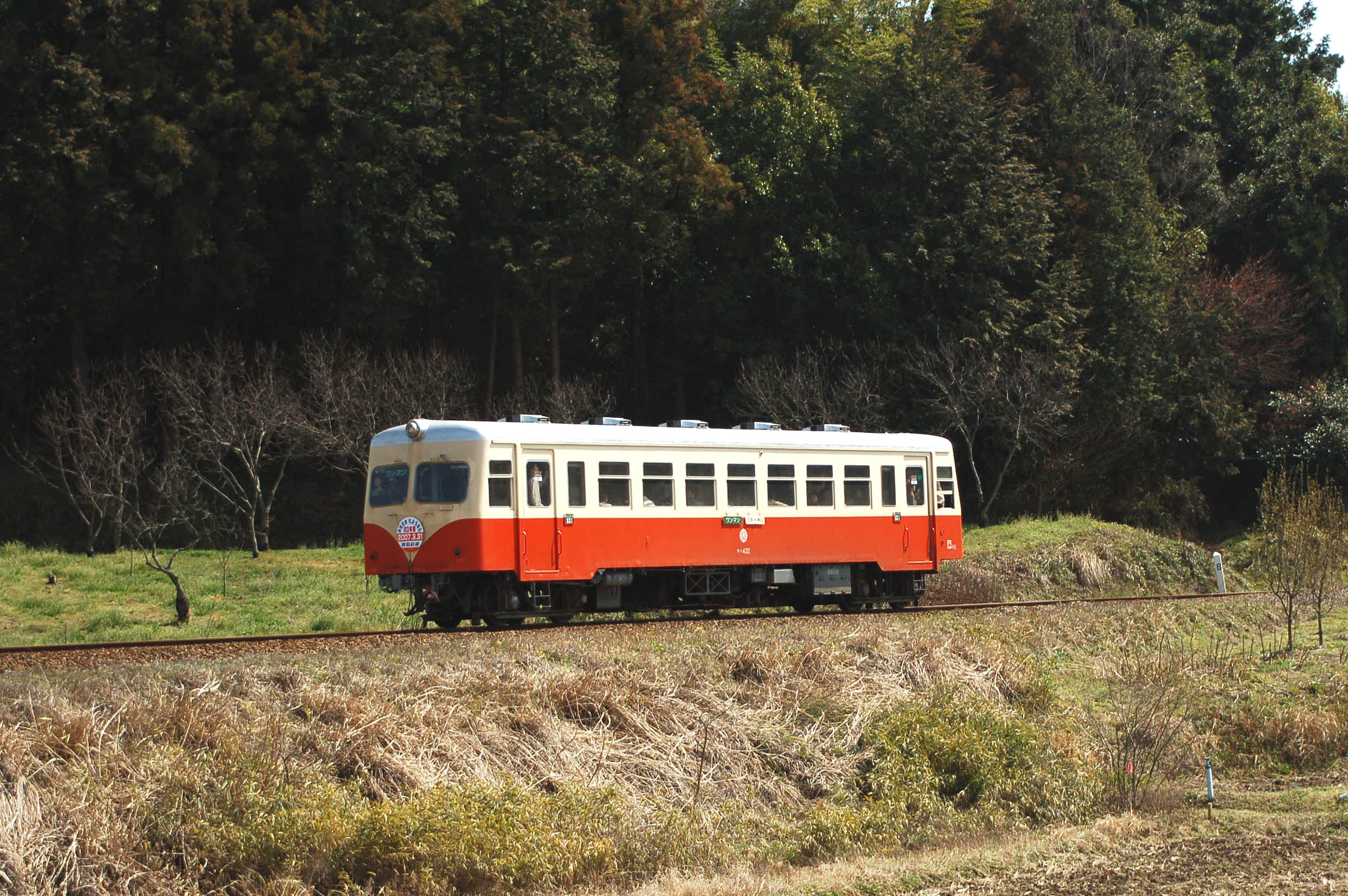
Kashima Sangu Railway train

- Tsuchiura Station: The Tsukura Railway opened a 40 km (25 mi) line to Iwase on the Mito Line in 1918. Freight services ceased in 1981, and the line closed in 1987.
- Tsuchiura Station: A 5 km (3.1 mi) line to Ami, electrified at 600 VDC, was operated by the Southern Electric Railway Co. between 1926/28 and 1938.
- Mito Station: The Mito Seashore Electric Railway Co. opened a line eventually extending 21 km (13 mi) between Kamimito and Nakaminato-Cho, electrified at 600 VDC, between 1922 and 1930. It closed in sections between 1953 and 1966. At Onuki station (12 km (7.5 mi) from Mito) on this line, the Kashima Light Railway Co. operated a 17 km (11 mi) 762 mm (2 ft 6 in) gauge line between 1926 and 1930 to Hokota (see Ishioka station entry below).
- Mito Station: The Mito Electric Railway Co. operated an 11 km (6.8 mi) line to Okunotani (not electrified, despite the company name) between 1929 and 1936.
- Ishioka Station: The Kashima Sangu Railway opened a 27 km (17 mi) line to Hokota between 1924 and 1929. Freight services ceased in 2002 and the line closed in 2007.
- Akatsuka Station: A 25 km (16 mi) line to Gozenyama was opened by the Ibaraki Railway Co. in 1926/27. In 1944/45 the first 4 km (2.5 mi) of the line to Minami Hakamatsuka was electrified. The line closed in sections between 1965 and 1971.
- Tokai Station: The Ibaraki Prefectural Government operated a 4 km (2.5 mi) 762 mm (2 ft 6 in) gauge line to Muramutsu between 1926 and 1933.
- Omika Station: An 11 km (6.8 mi) line to Johoku Ota (now Hitachi-Ota on the Suigun Line) was opened by the Johoku Electric Railway in 1928/29. In 1944 the company merged with the Hitachi Electric Railway, and a 7 km (4.3 mi) line to Akukawa was opened in 1947. Both lines were electrified at 600 V DC from opening. CTC signalling was commissioned in 1969, and in 1971 the lines became the first electric railway in Japan converted to a one-person operation. Both lines closed in 2005.
- Izumi Station: The Onahama Horse tram opened a 762 mm (2 ft 6 in) gauge line 5 km (3.1 mi) to its namesake town in 1907, and extended the line a further 5 km (3.1 mi) to Ena in 1916. The Onahama - Ena section closed in 1936, the company renamed itself the Onahama Port Railway in 1939, and converted the line to 1,067 mm (3 ft 6 in) gauge in 1941. The Ena Railway rebuilt the Onahama - Ena section as 1,067 mm (3 ft 6 in) in 1953. In 1965 a typhoon caused the collapse of a retaining wall, and the Onahama - Ena section formally closed in 1967. The passenger service on the Izumi - Onahama section ceased in 1972, the line is now freight-only operated by the Fukushima Rinkai Railway.
- Yumoto station: The 10 km (6.2 mi) gauge Iwaki Coalmine Railway operated to Onahama between 1905 and 1944.
- Yumoto station: A 6 km (3.7 mi) 762 mm (2 ft 6 in) line to Nagahashi was operated by the Iwaki City Council between 1914 and 1929.
- Uchigo station: The Furukawa Co. built a 7 km (4.3 mi) 762 mm (2 ft 6 in) gauge line to the Kita-Yoshima coal mine in 1905. In 1908 the line was rebuilt to 1,067 mm (3 ft 6 in) gauge and shortened by 1 km (0.62 mi). The mine and line closed in 1969.
- Iwaki station: The Yoshima and Akai local railways connected here, details of these lines are not currently available.

== See also ==
- Tohoku Main Line
