= Suetsugi Station =

Railway station in Iwaki, Fukushima Prefecture, Japan

Suetsugi Station 末続駅
- Suetsugi Station in October 2016

General information
- Location: Hisanohama-cho, Suetsugi, Iwaki-shi, Fukushima-ken 979-0331; Japan
- Coordinates: 37.1721°N 140.9954°E
- Operator: JR East
- Line: ■ Jōban Line
- Distance: 227.6 km from Nippori
- Platforms: 2 side platforms
- Tracks: 2

Other information
- Status: Unstaffed
- Website: Official website

History
- Opened: June 1, 1947

Passengers
- FY2004: 63

Services
Preceding station	JR East	Following station
Hisanohama towards Shinagawa	Jōban Line Local-Futsuu	Hirono towards Sendai
Location
- Location within Fukushima Prefecture Location within Japan

Suetsugi Station (末続駅, Suetsugi-eki) is a railway station in the city of Iwaki, Fukushima, Japan, operated by East Japan Railway Company (JR East).

== Lines ==
Suetsugi Station is served by the Jōban Line, and is located 227.6 km from the official starting point of the line at Nippori.

== Station layout ==
The station has two opposed side platforms connected to the station building by a footbridge. The station is unattended.

=== Platforms ===
1	■ Jōban Line	for Iwaki and Mito
2	■ Jōban Line	for Hirono and Tomioka

== History ==
Suetsugi Station opened on June 1, 1947. The station was absorbed into the JR East network upon the privatization of the Japanese National Railways (JNR) on April 1, 1987. From March 11 to October 10, 2011, following the Great East Japan earthquake and the Fukushima Daiichi nuclear disaster, train services were replaced by a bus operation.

== Surrounding area ==
- National Route 6

== See also ==
- List of railway stations in Japan
