= Hirono Station (Fukushima) =

Railway station in Hirono, Fukushima Prefecture, Japan

Hirono Station 広野駅
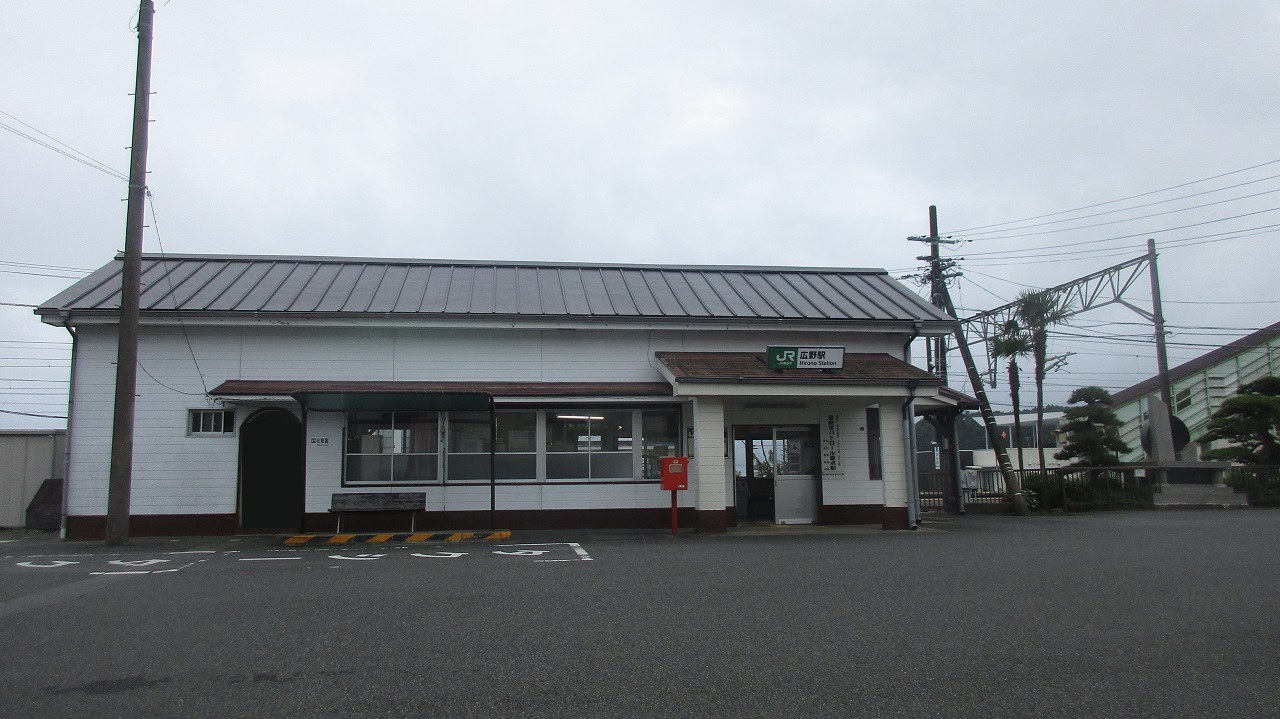
- Station building in August 2017

General information
- Location: Shimoasamigawa, Hirono-machi, Futaba-gun, Fukushima-ken 979-0403; Japan
- Coordinates: 37°12′44″N 140°59′57″E
- Operator: JR East
- Line: ■ Jōban Line
- Distance: 227.6 km from Nippori
- Platforms: 3 (1 island platform, 1 side platform)
- Tracks: 3

Construction
- Structure type: At-grade

Other information
- Status: Unstaffed
- Website: Official website

History
- Opened: 23 August 1898; 128 years ago

Passengers
- FY2019: 438 daily

Services
Preceding station	JR East	Following station
Iwaki towards Shinagawa	Hitachi	Tomioka towards Sendai
Suetsugi towards Shinagawa	Jōban Line Local-Futsuu	J-Village towards Sendai
Location
- Location within Fukushima Prefecture Location within Japan

Hirono Station (広野駅, Hirono eki) is a railway station in the town of Hirono, Fukushima, Japan, operated by East Japan Railway Company (JR East).

== Lines ==
Hirono Station is served by the Jōban Line, and is located 232.4 km from the official starting point of the line at Nippori. However, due to the Fukushima Daiichi nuclear disaster in 2011, operations were halted. Operations south of the station were resumed on June 1, 2014, however operations north past Tomioka Station remained suspended until 2017.

== Station layout ==
The station has one island platform and one side platform connected to the station building by a footbridge. The station became Unstaffed in October 2021.

=== Platforms ===
1	■ Jōban Line	for Tomioka, Namie, Haranomachi, Soma and Sendai
2	■ Jōban Line	for Iwaki and Mito (starting trains)
3	■ Jōban Line	for Iwaki, Takahagi, Hitachi, Mito, Tomobe and Tsuchiura

== History ==
Hirono Station opened on August 23, 1898. The station was absorbed into the JR East network upon the privatization of the Japanese National Railways (JNR) on April 1, 1987. On March 11, 2011, the station closed following the Great East Japan earthquake and the Fukushima Daiichi nuclear disaster. Services south were resumed on October 10, 2011. On June 1, 2014, the station resumed operations as far as Tatsuta Station to the north. This was extended as far as Tomioka Station on October 21, 2017 and the complete line was reopened on March 14, 2020.

== Passenger statistics ==
In fiscal 2018, the station was used by an average of 402 passengers daily (boarding passengers only).

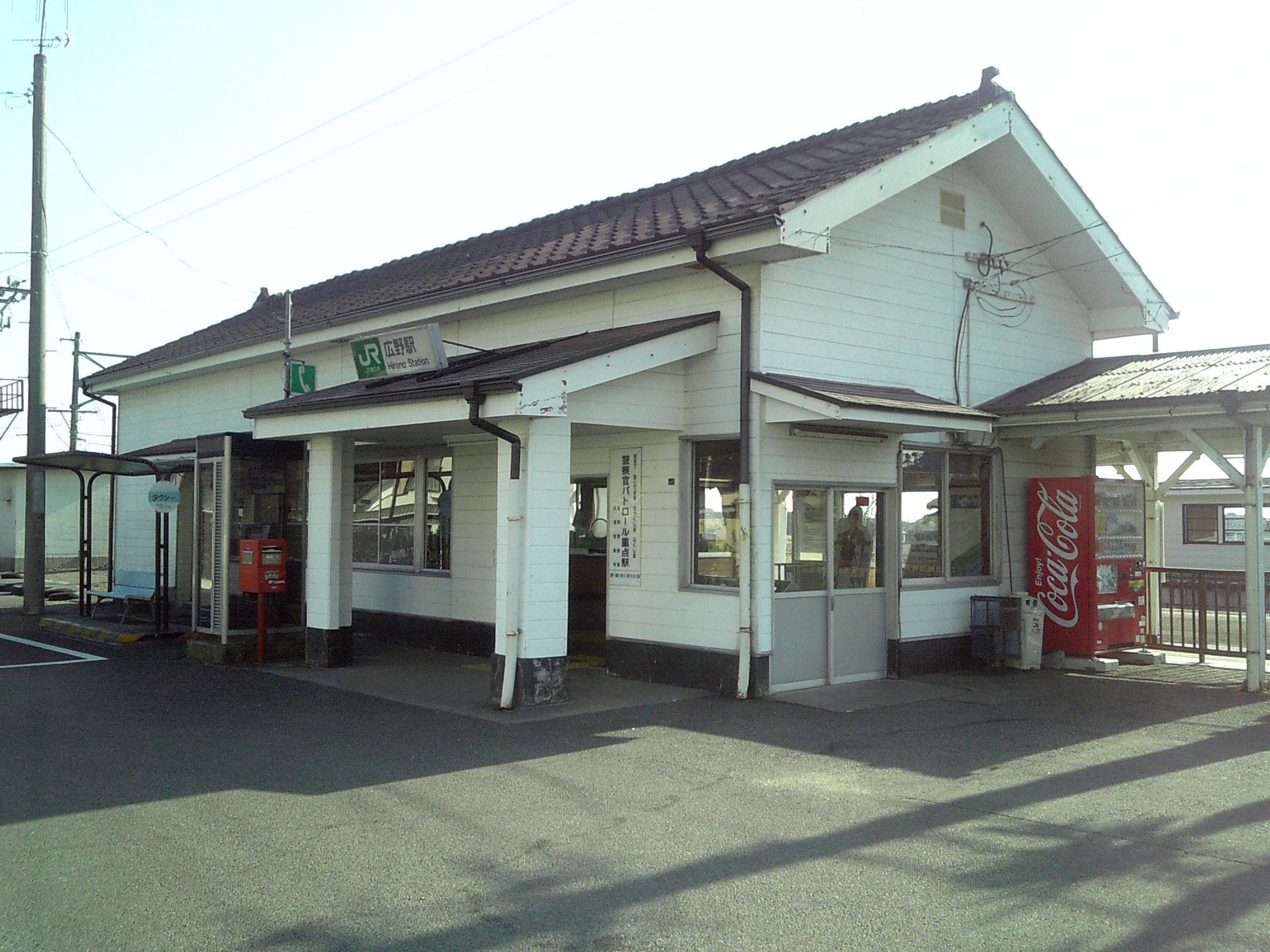
Station building in March 2008

== Surrounding area ==
- Hirono Post Office
- National Route 6

== See also ==
- List of railway stations in Japan
