= Ōmika Station =

Railway station in Hitachi, Ibaraki Prefecture, Japan

Ōmika Station 大甕駅
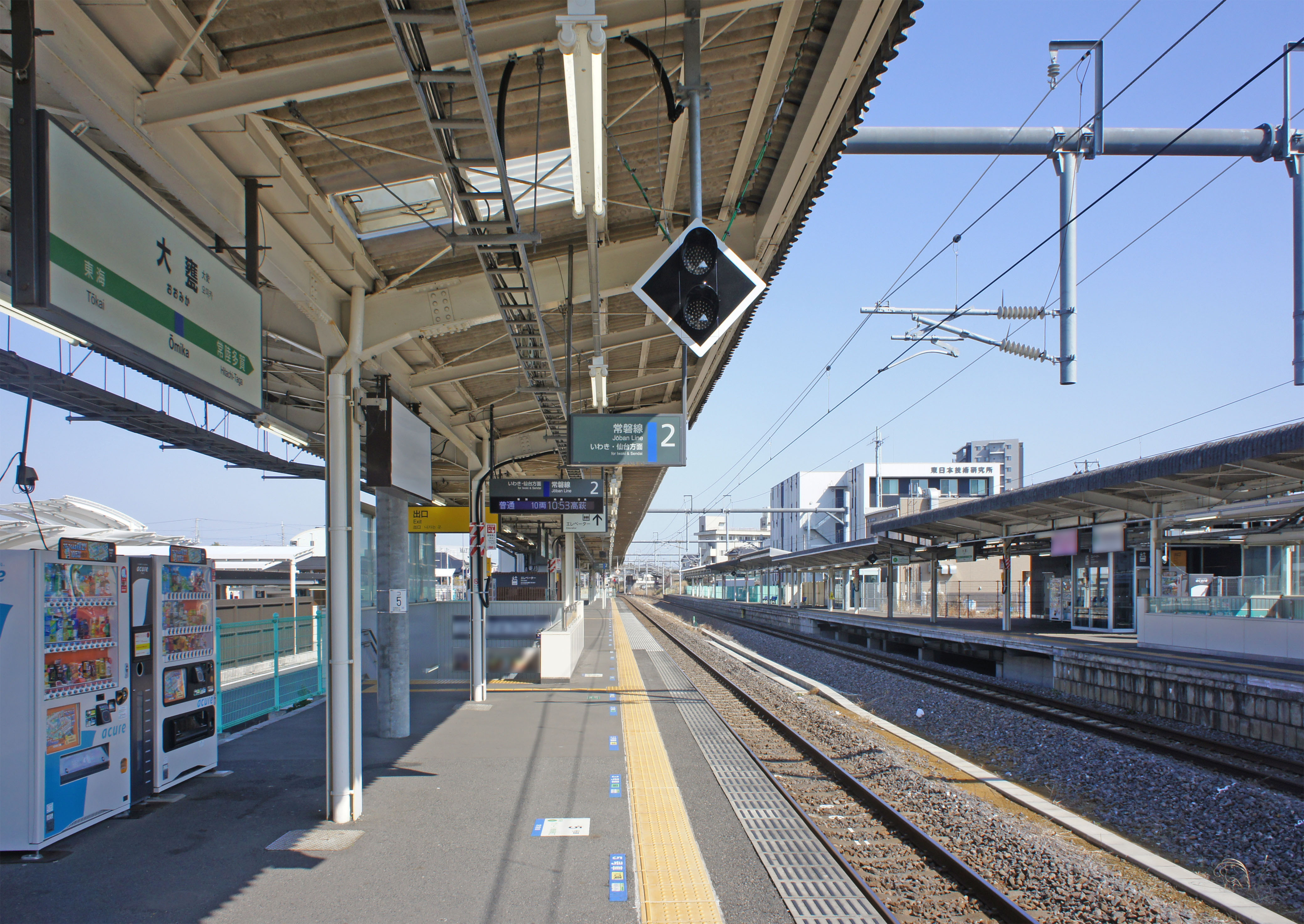
- Platforms, February 2022

General information
- Location: Ōmika 2-23-10, Hitachi City, Ibaraki Prefecture 319-1221; Japan
- Coordinates: 36.5132°N 140.6194°E
- Operator: JR East
- Line: Jōban Line
- Distance: 137.4 km (85.4 mi) from Nippori
- Platforms: 2 side platforms
- Tracks: 2

Construction
- Structure type: At grade

Other information
- Status: Staffed (Midori no Madoguchi)
- Website: Official website

History
- Opened: 25 February 1897; 129 years ago

Passengers
- FY2021: 7,555 daily

Services
| Preceding station | JR East | Following station |
|---|---|---|
| Tōkai (limited service) towards Shinagawa | Hitachi (limited service) | Hitachi-Taga (limited service) towards Sendai |
| Tōkai towards Shinagawa | Tokiwa | Hitachi-Taga towards Takahagi |
| Tōkai towards Shinagawa | Jōban Line Local-Futsuu | Hitachi-Taga towards Sendai |
Location
- Location within Ibaraki Prefecture Location within Kanto Area Location within Japan

Ōmika Station (大甕駅, Ōmika-eki) is a passenger railway station located in the city of Hitachi, Ibaraki Prefecture, Japan operated by the East Japan Railway Company (JR East).

== Lines ==
Ōmika Station is served by the Jōban Line, and is located 137.4 km from the official starting point of the line at Nippori Station.

== Station layout ==
The station consists two opposed side platforms connected to the station building by a footbridge. The station has a Midori no Madoguchi staffed ticket office.

=== Platforms ===
| 1 | ■ Jōban Line ( Ueno-Tokyo Line) | for Katsuta, Mito, Tomobe, Ishioka, Tsuchiura, Ueno, Tokyo and Shinagawa |
| 1 | ■ Jōban Line | for Mito, Tomobe, Kasama, Shimodate, and Oyama |
| 2 | ■ Jōban Line | for Hitachi, Takahagi, Isohara, Iwaki, Haranomachi and Sendai |

== Gallery ==
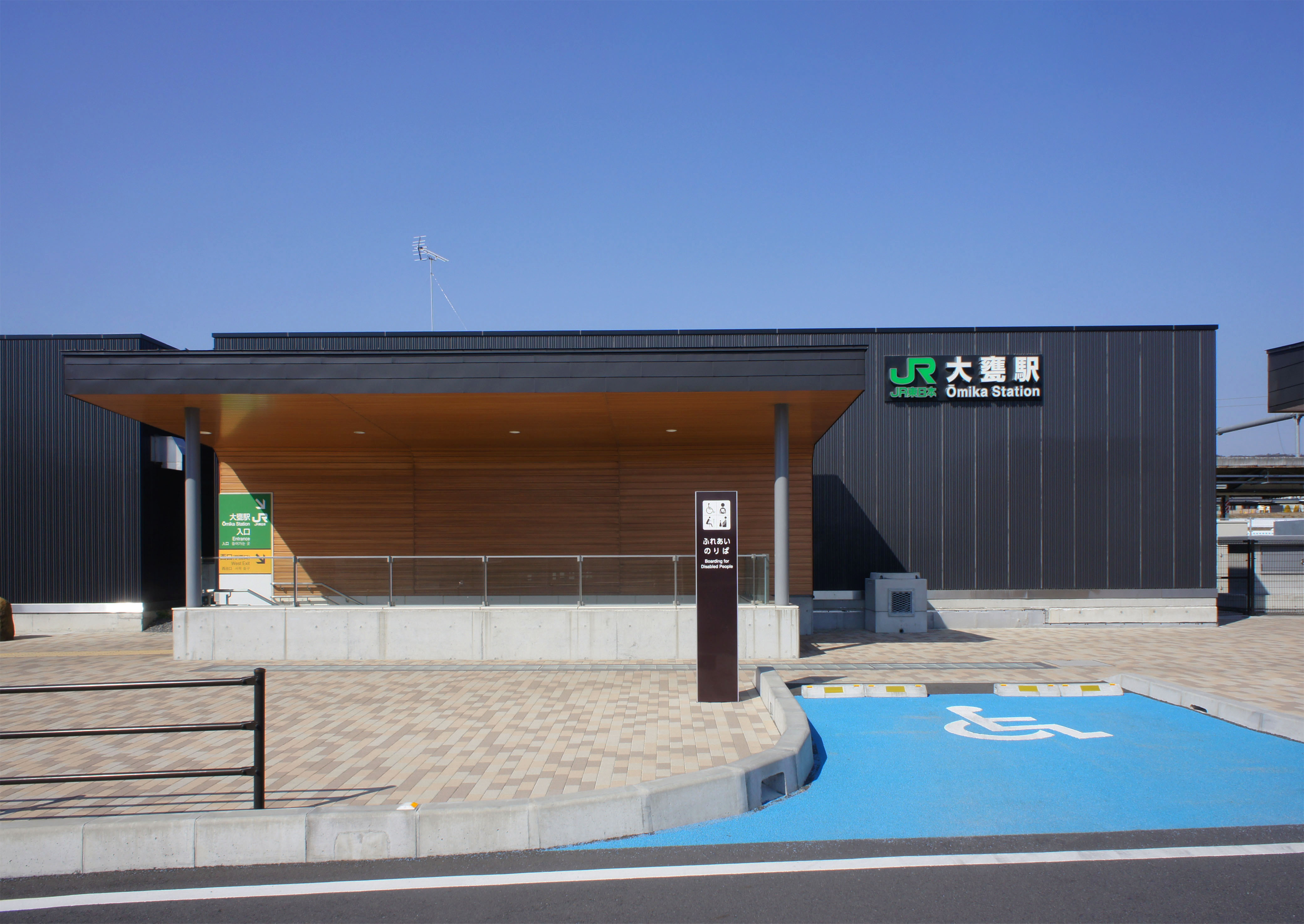
Platform level of the East Exit

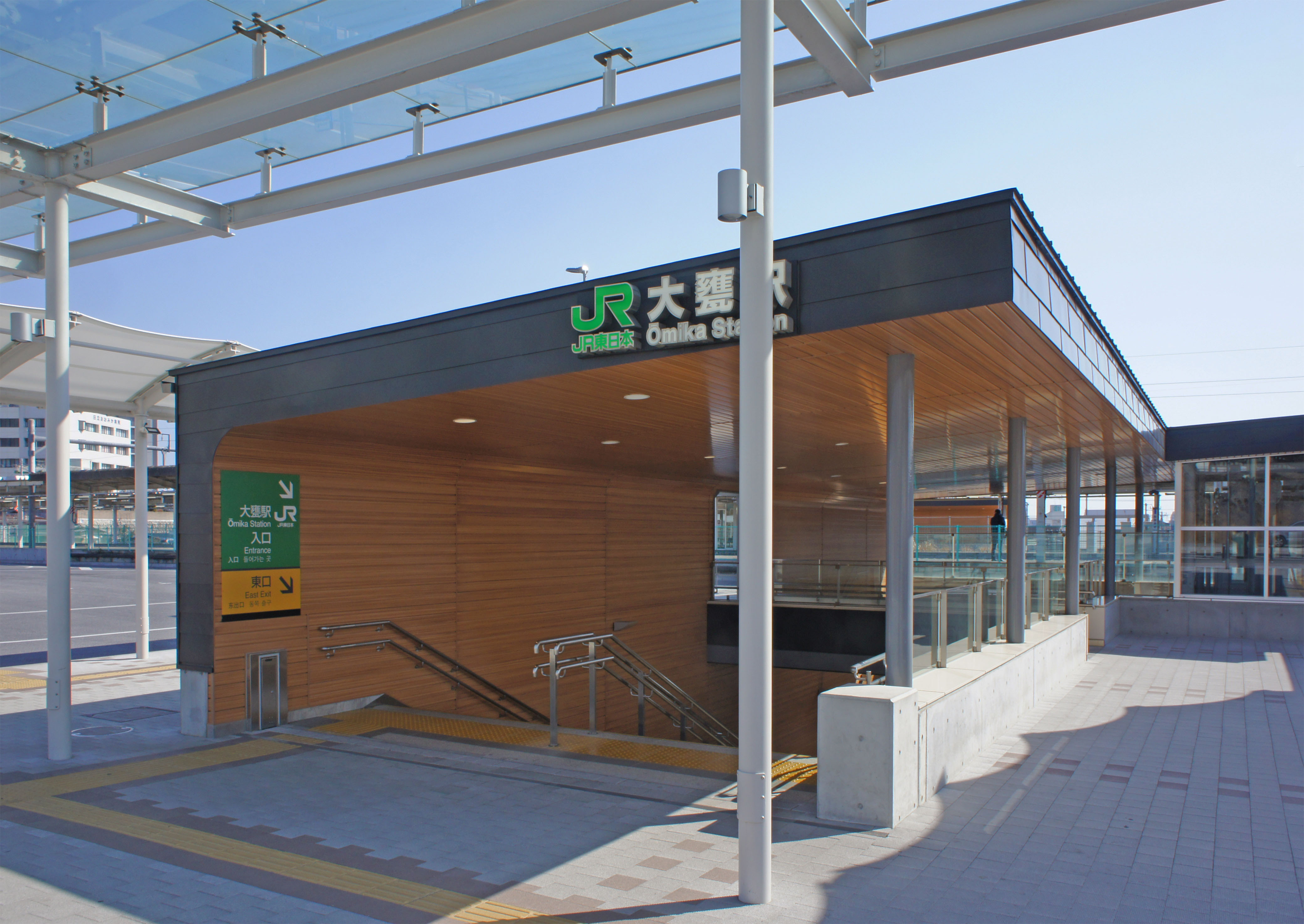
West Exit of Ōmika Station, February 2022

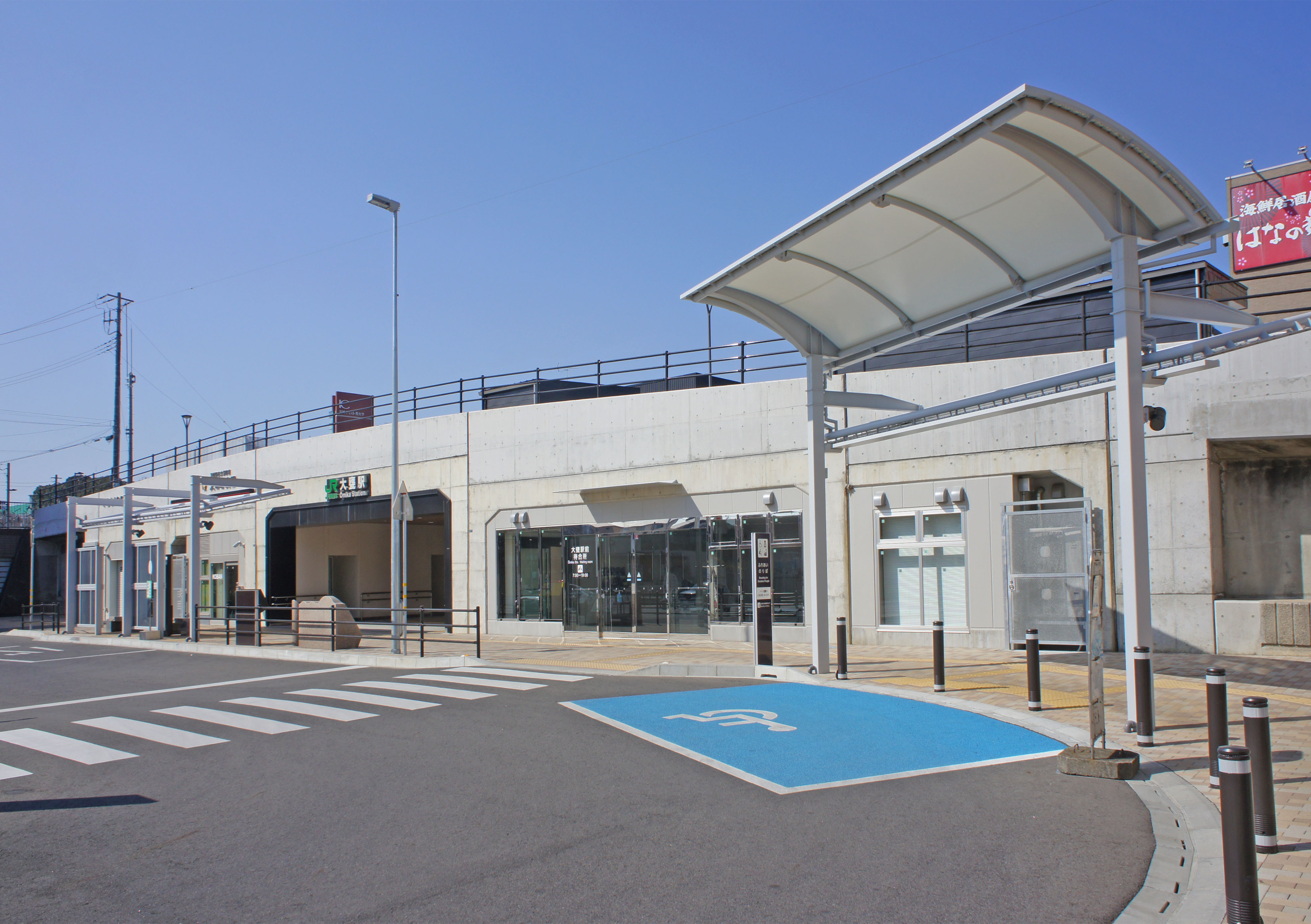
East Exit, February 2022

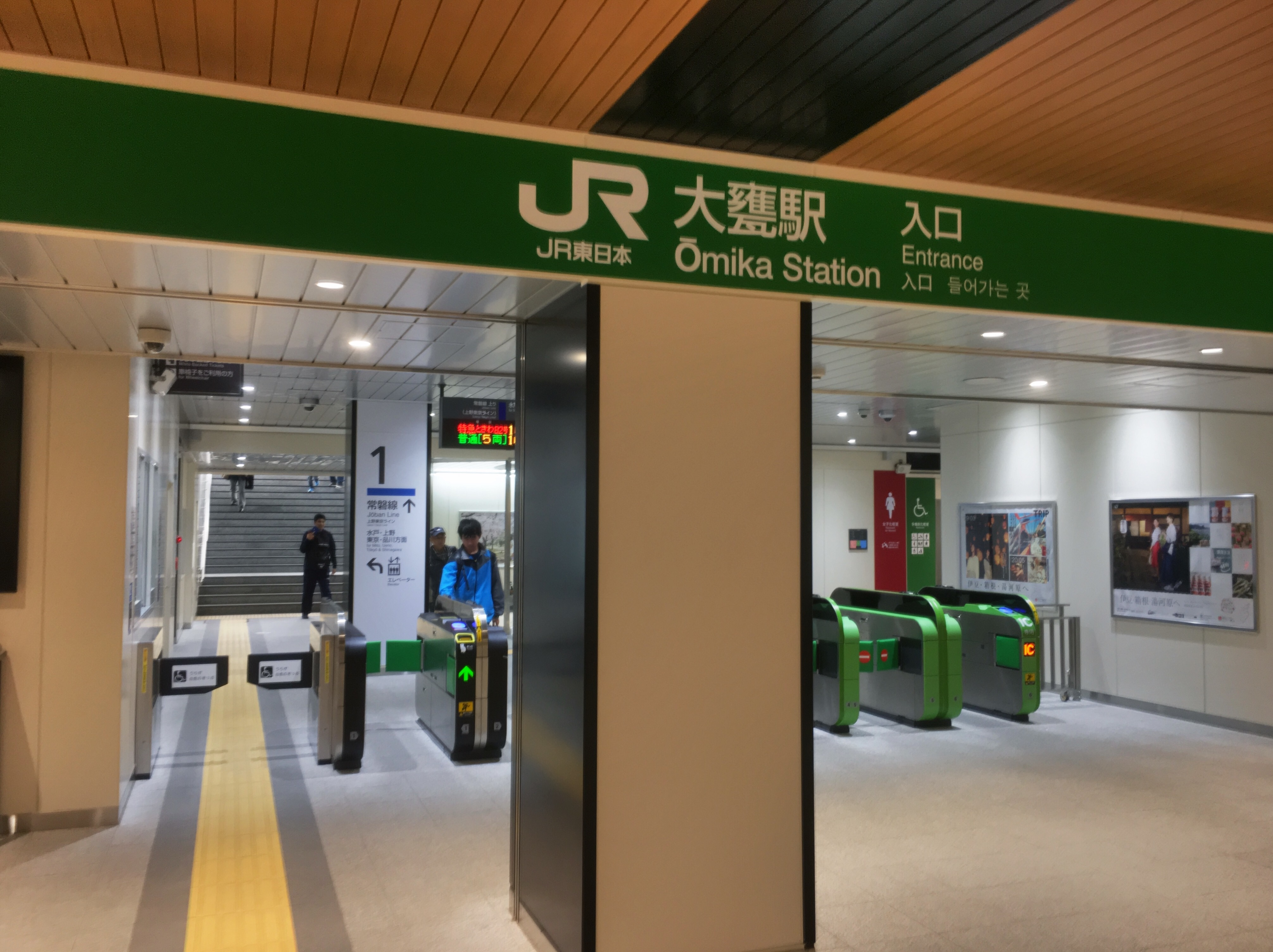
Ōmika Station entrance, 29 April 2019

== History ==
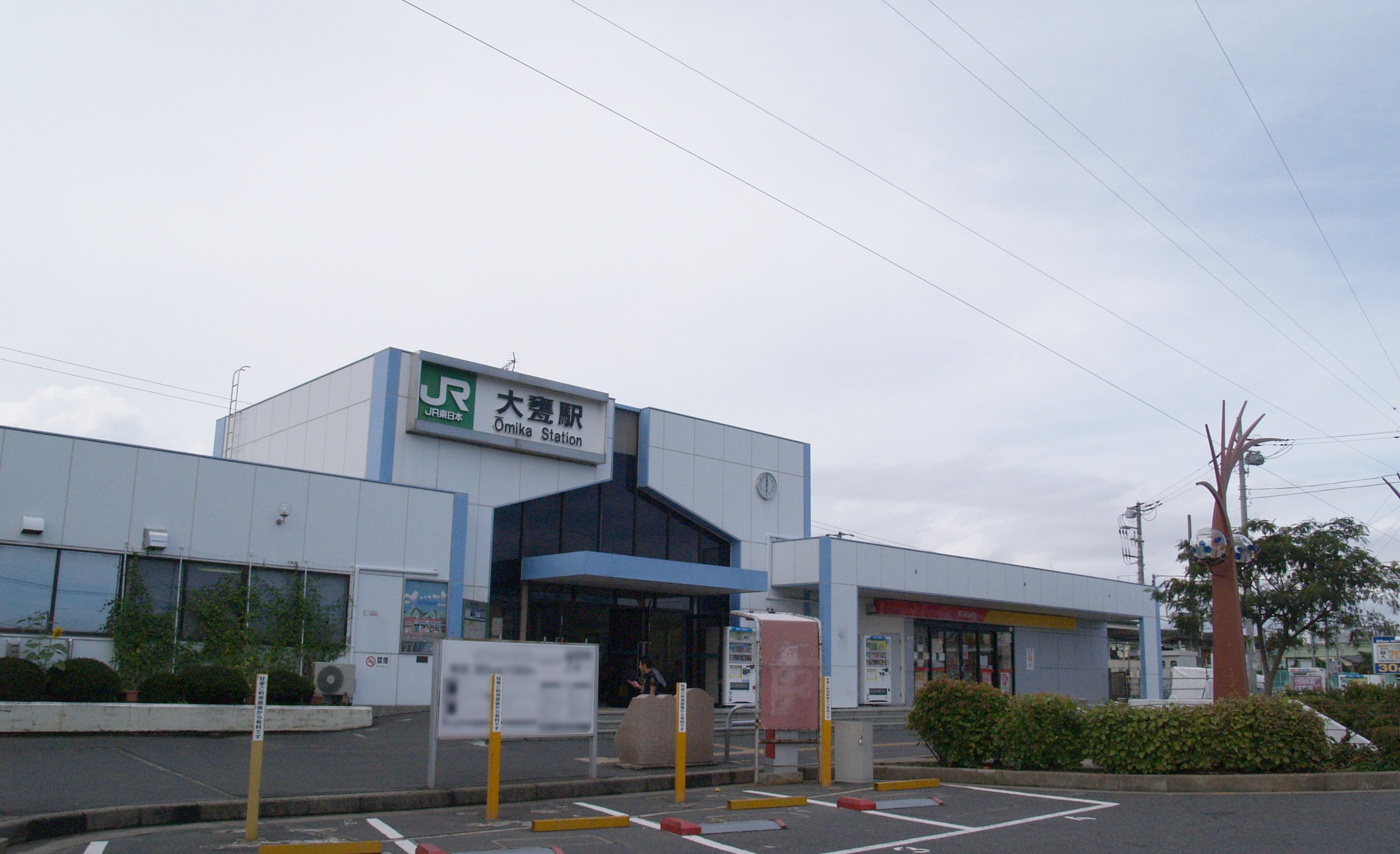
Omika station at September 2011

Ōmika Station was opened on 25 February 1897. The Hitachi Electric Railway operated to this station from 1928 to 2005. The station was absorbed into the JR East network upon the privatization of the Japanese National Railways (JNR) on 1 April 1987.

== Passenger statistics ==
In fiscal 2019, the station was used by an average of 9600 passengers daily (boarding passengers only).

== Surrounding area ==
- Port of Ibaraki
- Omika Post Office
- Hitachi Seisakusho
- National Route 6
- National Route 245
- Ibaraki Christian University

== See also ==
- List of railway stations in Japan
