= Hitachi-Taga Station =

Railway station in Hitachi, Ibaraki Prefecture, Japan

Hitachi-Taga Station 常陸多賀駅
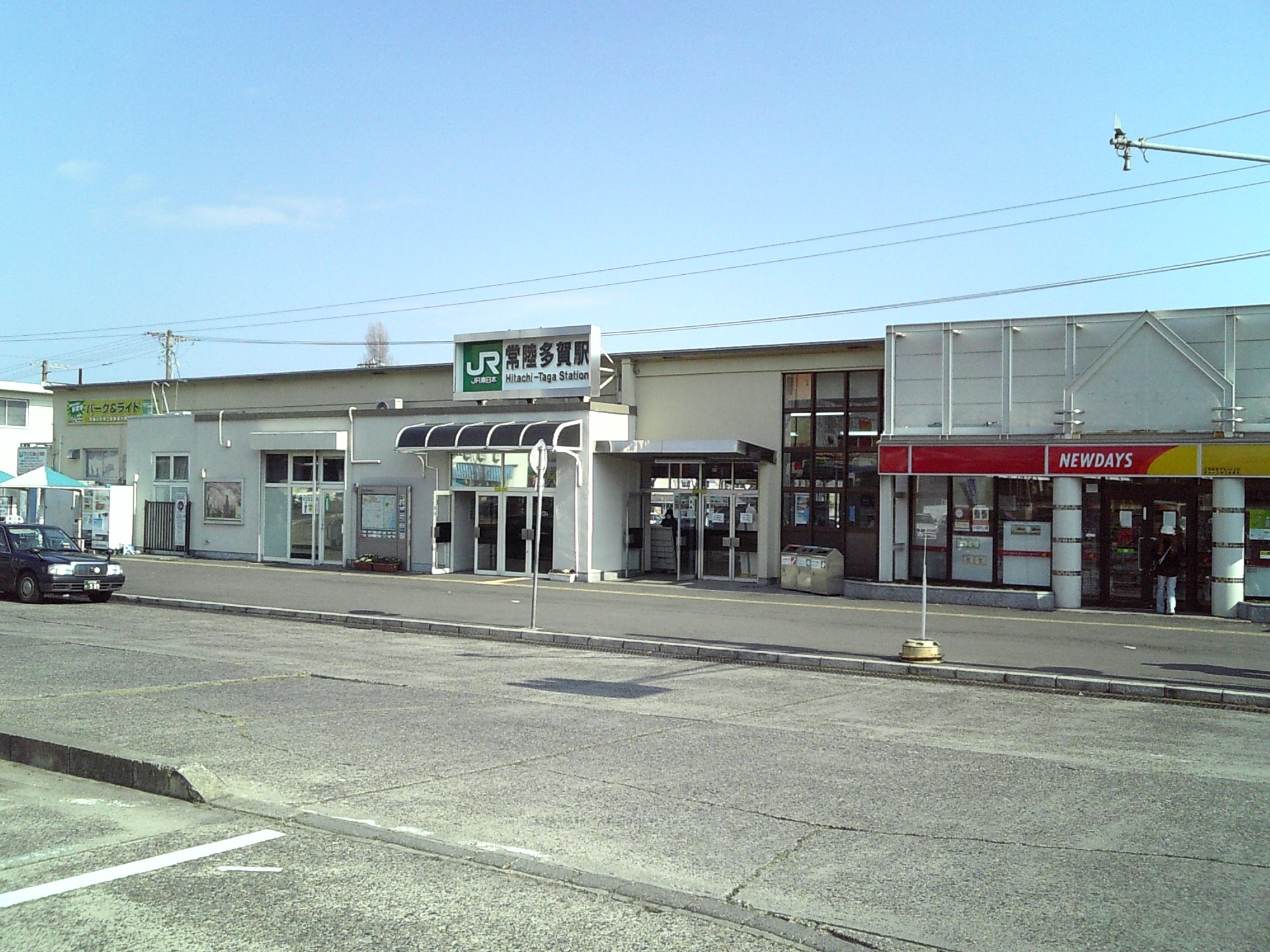
- Hitachi-Taga Station, March 2008

General information
- Location: 1-1-1 Taga-cho, Hitachi City, Ibaraki Prefecture 316-0004; Japan
- Coordinates: 36.5520°N 140.6328°E
- Operator: JR East; JR Freight
- Line: Jōban Line
- Distance: 142.0 km (88.2 mi) from Nippori
- Platforms: 1 side + 1 island platform
- Tracks: 3

Construction
- Structure type: At grade

Other information
- Status: Staffed (Midori no Madoguchi)
- Website: Official website

History
- Opened: 25 February 1897; 129 years ago
- Former names: Shimomago (until 1939)

Passengers
- FY2021: 5,202 daily

Services
Preceding station	JR East	Following station
Ōmika (limited service) towards Shinagawa	Hitachi (limited service)	Hitachi towards Sendai
Ōmika towards Shinagawa	Tokiwa	Hitachi towards Takahagi
Ōmika towards Shinagawa	Jōban Line Local-Futsuu	Hitachi towards Sendai
Location
- Location within Ibaraki Prefecture Location within Kanto Area Location within Japan

Hitachi-Taga Station (常陸多賀駅, Hitachi-Taga-eki) is a railway station located in the city of Hitachi, Ibaraki Prefecture, Japan operated by the East Japan Railway Company (JR East). It is also a freight depot for the Japan Freight Railway Company (JR Freight).

== Lines ==
Hitachi-Taga Station is served by the Jōban Line, and is located 142.0 km from the official starting point of the line at Nippori Station.

== Station layout ==
The station is an elevated station with one side platform and one island platform. The station has a Midori no Madoguchi ticket office.

=== Platforms ===
1	■ Jōban Line	for Hitachi, Takahagi, Iwaki, Haranomachi and Sendai
2,3	■ Joban Line ( Ueno-Tokyo Line)	for Katsuta, Mito, Tomobe, Ishioka, Tsuchiura, Ueno, Tokyo and Shinagawa
2,3	■ Mito Line	for Katsuta, Mito, Tomobe, Kasama, Shimodate and Oyama

== History ==
Hitachi-Taga Station was opened on 25 February 1897 as Shimomago Station (下孫駅) . It was renamed to its present name on 20 October 1939. The station was absorbed into the JR East network upon the privatization of the Japanese National Railways (JNR) on 1 April 1987.

== Passenger statistics ==
In fiscal 2019, the station was used by an average of 6653 passengers daily (boarding passengers only).

== Surrounding area ==
- Hitachi City Hall
- Taga Post Office
- Hitachi Company – Taga Plant
- National Route 6
- National Route 245

== See also ==
- List of railway stations in Japan
