= Sawa Station (Ibaraki) =

Railway station in Hitachinaka, Ibaraki Prefecture, Japan

Sawa Station 佐和駅
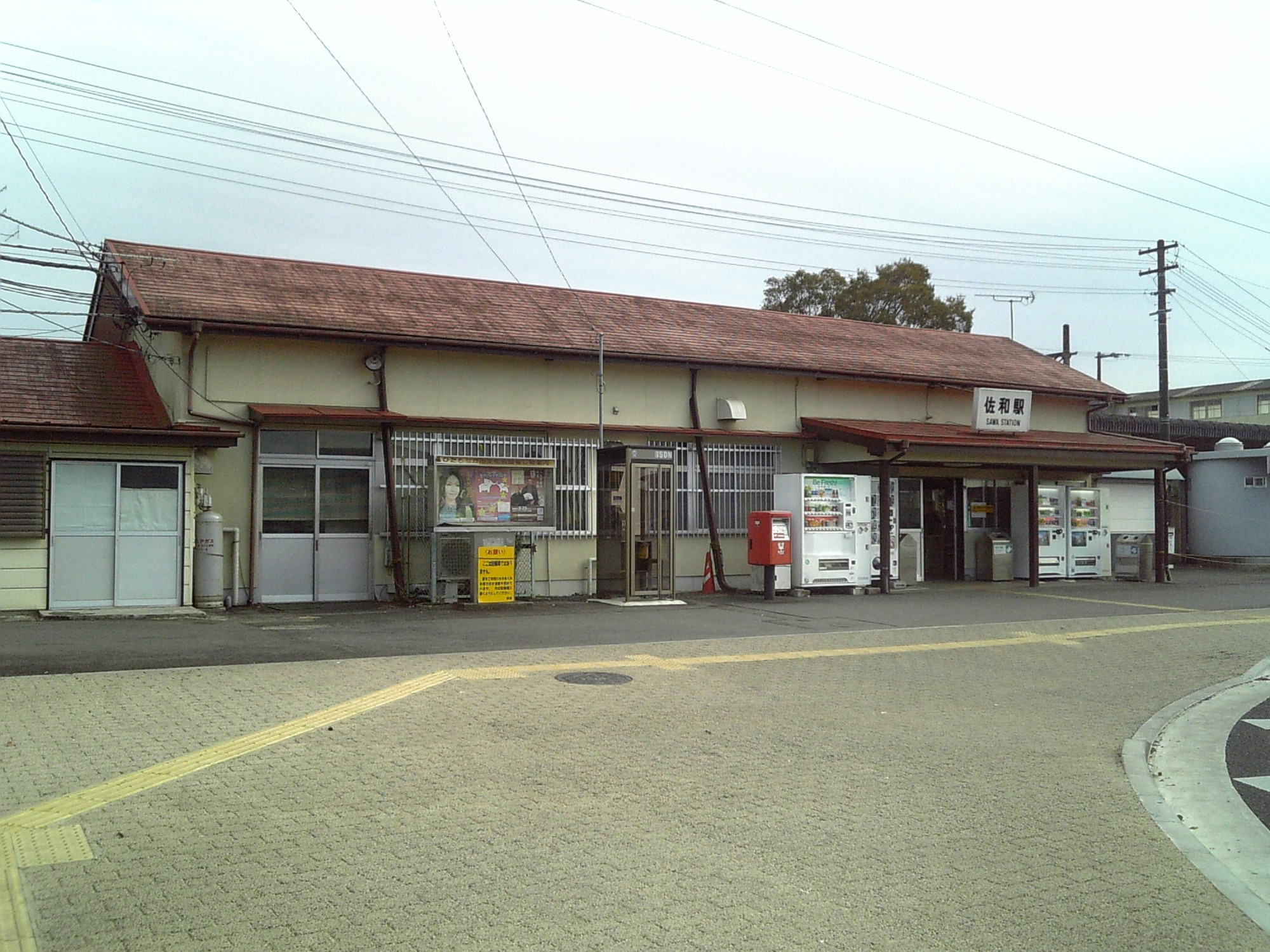
- Sawa Station, November 2007

General information
- Location: Takaba 574, Hitachinaka-shi, Ibaraki-ken 312-0062; Japan
- Coordinates: 36.4304°N 140.5406°E
- Operator: JR East
- Line: ■ Jōban Line
- Distance: 125.3 km from Nippori
- Platforms: 2 side platforms

Other information
- Status: Staffed
- Website: Official website

History
- Opened: 25 February 1897

Passengers
- FY2019: 3887 daily

Services
Preceding station	JR East	Following station
Katsuta towards Shinagawa	Jōban Line Local-Futsuu	Tōkai towards Sendai
Location
- Location within Ibaraki Prefecture Location within Japan

Sawa Station (佐和駅, Sawa-eki) is a railway station located in the city of Hitachinaka, Ibaraki Prefecture, Japan operated by the East Japan Railway Company (JR East).

== Lines ==
Sawa Station is served by the Jōban Line, and is located 125.3 km from the official starting point of the line at Nippori Station.

== Station layout ==
The station consists of two opposed side platforms connected to the station building by a footbridge. The station is attended.

=== Platforms ===
1	■ Jōban Line	for Hitachi, Takahagi, Iwaki and Haranomachi
2	■ Jōban Line ( Ueno-Tokyo Line)	for Katsuta, Mito, Tomobe, Ishioka, Tsuchiura, Ueno, Tokyo and Shinagawa
2	■ Mito Line	for Mito, Tomobe, Kasama, Shimodate, and Oyama

== History ==
Sawa Station was opened on 25 February 1897. The station was absorbed into the JR East network upon the privatization of the Japanese National Railways (JNR) on 1 April 1987.

== Passenger statistics ==
In fiscal 2019, the station was used by an average of 3887 passengers daily (boarding passengers only).

== Surrounding area ==
- Kasamatsu Stadium
- JGSDF Camp Katsuta

== See also ==
- List of railway stations in Japan
