= Tōkai Station =

Railway station in Tōkai, Ibaraki Prefecture, Japan

Tōkai Station 東海駅
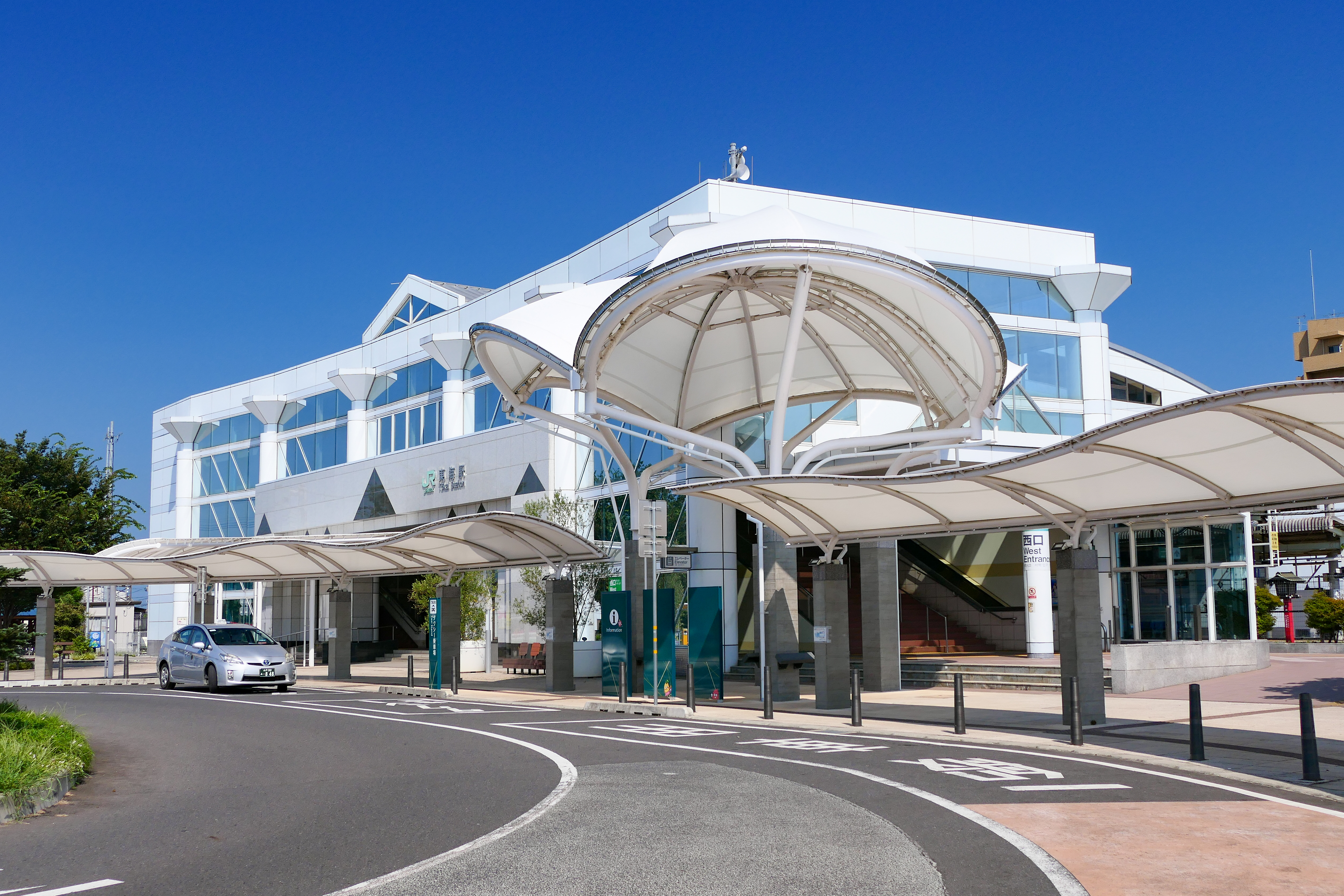
- Tōkai Station, July 2023

General information
- Location: 1-1-1 Funaishikawaekinishi, Tōkai Village, Naka City, Ibaraki Prefecture 319-1116; Japan
- Coordinates: 36.4654°N 140.5657°E
- Operator: JR East
- Line: Jōban Line
- Distance: 130.0 km (80.8 mi) from Nippori
- Platforms: 1 side + 1 island platform
- Tracks: 3

Construction
- Structure type: At grade

Other information
- Status: Staffed (Midori no Madoguchi)
- Website: Official website

History
- Opened: 1 April 1898; 128 years ago
- Former names: Ishigami (until 1957)

Passengers
- FY2021: 3,982 daily

Services
Preceding station	JR East	Following station
Katsuta towards Shinagawa	Hitachi (limited service)	Ōmika (limited service) towards Sendai
Katsuta towards Shinagawa	Tokiwa	Ōmika towards Takahagi
Sawa towards Shinagawa	Jōban Line Local-Futsuu	Ōmika towards Sendai
Location
- Location within Ibaraki Prefecture Location within Kanto Area Location within Japan

Tōkai Station (東海駅, Tōkai-eki) is a passenger railway station located in the village of Tōkai, Ibaraki Prefecture, Japan, operated by the East Japan Railway Company (JR East).

== Lines ==
Tōkai Station is served by the Jōban Line, and is located 130.0 km from the official starting point of the line at Nippori Station.

== Station layout ==
The station consists of one side platform and one island platform connected to the station building by an overhead passageway. The station has a Midori no Madoguchi staffed ticket office.

=== Platforms ===
1,2	■ Jōban Line	for Hitachi, Takahagi, Isohara, Iwaki and Haranomachi
2,3	■ Joban Line ( Ueno-Tokyo Line)	for Katsuta, Mito, Tomobe, Ishioka, Tsuchiura, Ueno, Tokyo and Shinagawa
2,3	■ Mito Line	for Mito, Tomobe, Kasama, Shimodate, and Oyama

== History ==
Tōkai Station was opened on 1 April 1898 as Ishigami Station (石神駅). The station was renamed to its present name on 1 April 1957. The station was absorbed into the JR East network upon the privatization of the Japanese National Railways (JNR) on 1 April 1987. A new station building was completed in July 1994.

== Passenger statistics ==
In fiscal 2019, the station was used by an average of 5055 passengers daily (boarding passengers only).

== Surrounding area ==
- Tōkai Village Hall
- Tōkai Post Office

== See also ==
- List of railway stations in Japan
