= Ogitsu Station =

Railway station in Hitachi, Ibaraki Prefecture, Japan

Ogitsu Station 小木津駅
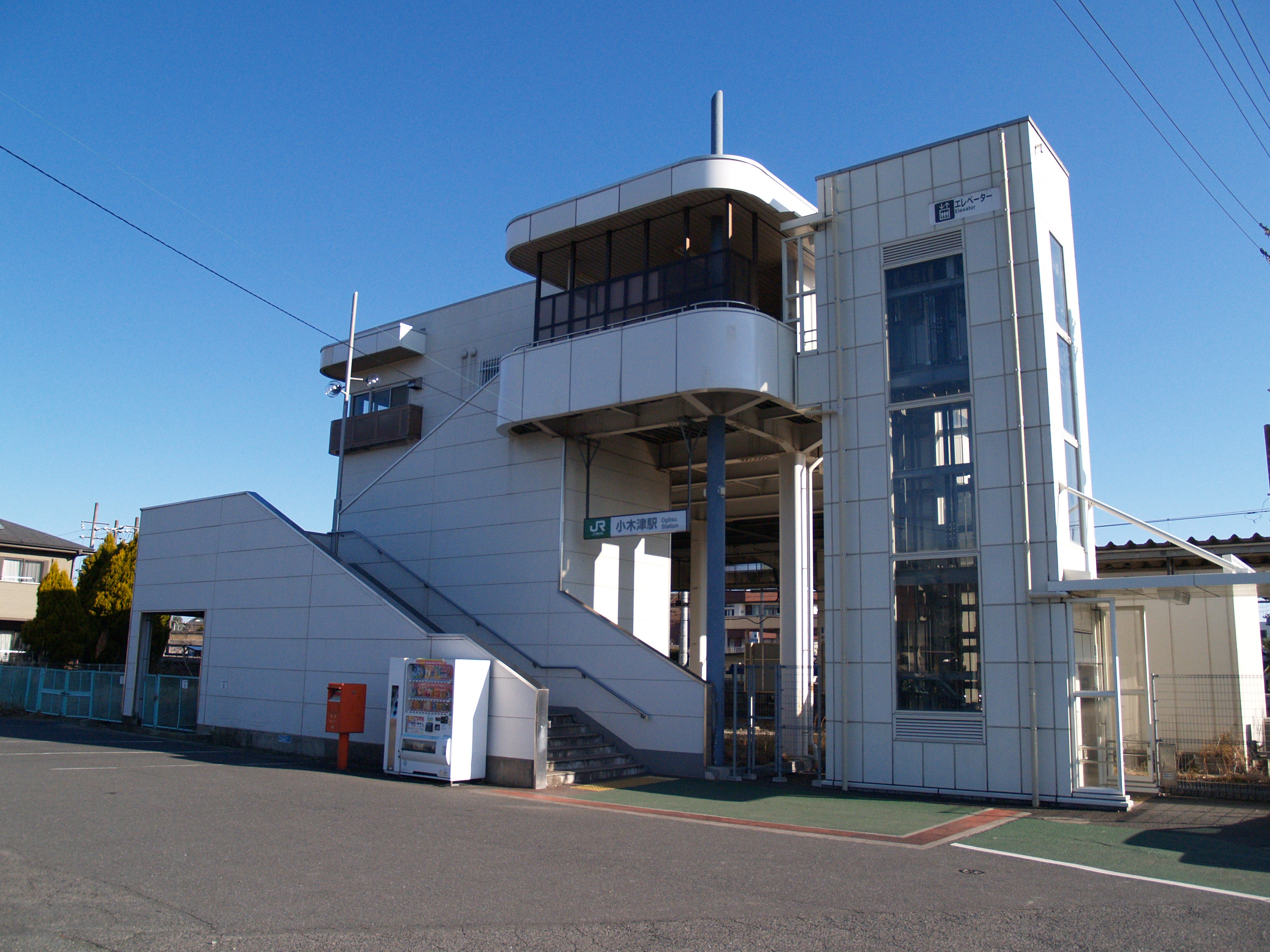
- Ogitsu Station, January 2014

General information
- Location: Hidaka-cho 1-2, Hitachi-shi, Ibaraki-ken 319-1414; Japan
- Coordinates: 36.6367°N 140.6751°E
- Operator: JR East
- Line: ■ Jōban Line
- Distance: 152.4 km from Nippori
- Platforms: 1 island platform

Other information
- Status: Staffed
- Website: Official website

History
- Opened: 16 December 1909; 116 years ago09

Passengers
- FY2019: 2504 daily

Services
Preceding station	JR East	Following station
Hitachi towards Shinagawa	Jōban Line Local-Futsuu	Jūō towards Sendai
Location
- Location within Ibaraki Prefecture Location within Japan

Ogitsu Station (小木津駅, Ogitsu-eki) is a passenger railway station located in the city of Hitachi, Ibaraki Prefecture, Japan operated by the East Japan Railway Company (JR East).

== Lines ==
Ogitsu Station is served by the Jōban Line, and is located 152.4 km from the official starting point of the line at Nippori Station.

== Station layout ==
The station is an elevated station with a single island platform. The station is staffed.

=== Platforms ===
1	■ Jōban Line	for Takahagi, Isohara, Iwaki, Tomioka and Haranomachi
2	■ Joban Line ( Ueno-Tokyo Line)	for Hitachi, Katsuta, Mito, Tomobe, Ishioka, Tsuchiura, Ueno, Tokyo and Shinagawa
2	■ Mito Line	for Hitachi, Katsuta, Mito, Tomobe, Kasama, Shimodate, and Oyama

== History ==
Ogitsu Station was opened on 16 December 1909. The current station building was completed in 1982. The station was absorbed into the JR East network upon the privatization of the Japanese National Railways (JNR) on 1 April 1987.

== Passenger statistics ==
In fiscal 2019, the station was used by an average of 2504 passengers daily (boarding passengers only).

== Surrounding area ==
- Hitachi Metals Hidaka plant
- Hitachi City Hall Hidaka branch office

== See also ==
- List of railway stations in Japan
