= Jūō Station =

Railway station in Hitachi, Ibaraki Prefecture, Japan

Jūō Station 十王駅
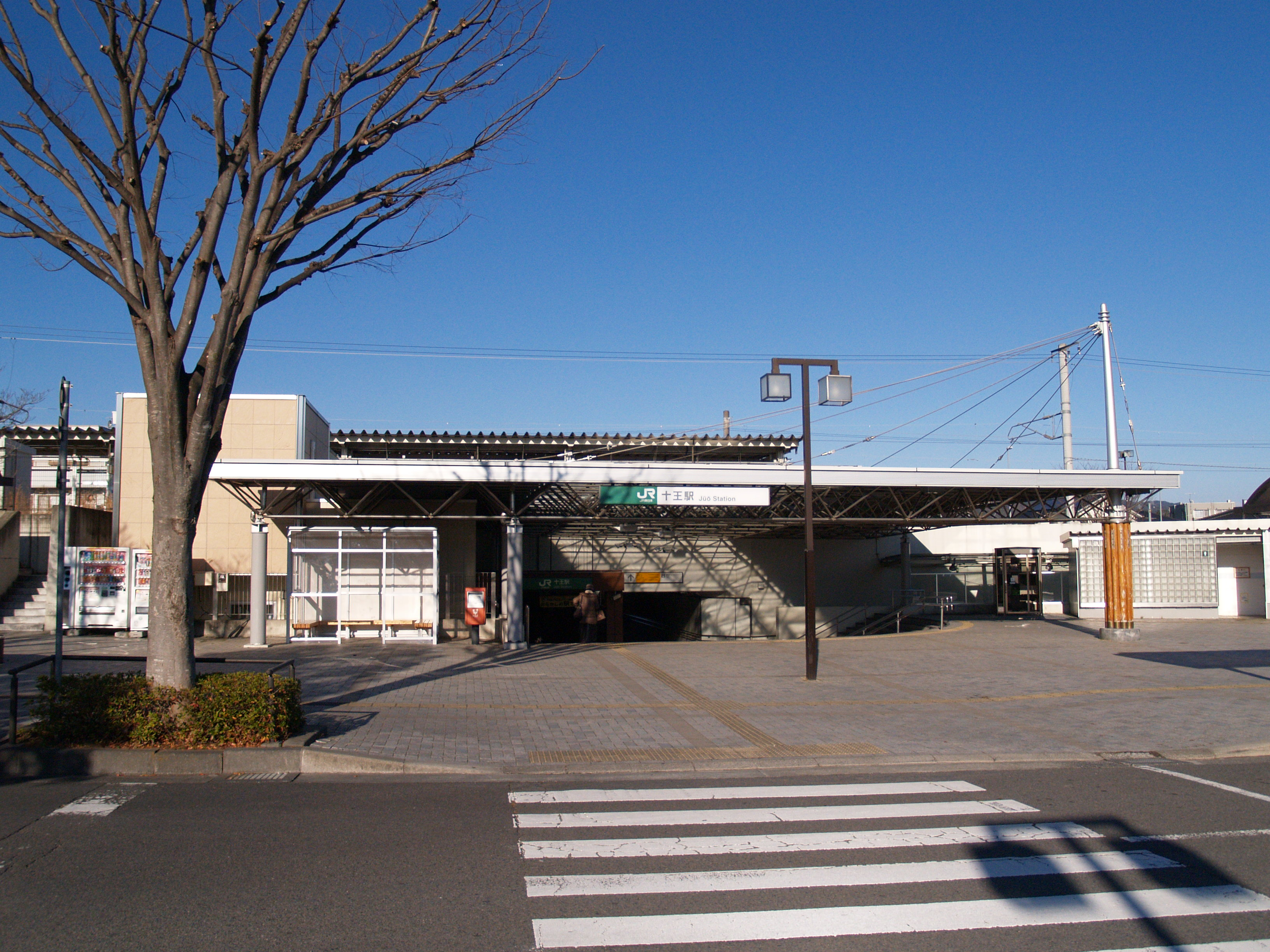
- Jūō Station, January 2014

General information
- Location: Jūō-cho Tomobe 177, Hitachi-shi, Ibaraki-ken 319-1304; Japan
- Coordinates: 36.6712°N 140.6863°E
- Operator: JR East
- Line: ■ Jōban Line
- Distance: 156.6 km from Nippori
- Platforms: 1 island platform

Other information
- Status: Staffed
- Website: Official website

History
- Opened: 25 February 1897; 129 years ago
- Former names: Kawajiri (until 2004)

Passengers
- FY2019: 2957 daily

Services
Preceding station	JR East	Following station
Ogitsu towards Shinagawa	Jōban Line Local-Futsuu	Takahagi towards Sendai
Location
- Location within Ibaraki Prefecture Location within Japan

Jūō Station (十王駅, Jūō-eki) is a passenger railway station located in the city of Hitachi, Ibaraki Prefecture, Japan operated by the East Japan Railway Company (JR East).

== Lines ==
Jūō Station is served by the Jōban Line, and is located 156.6 km from the official starting point of the line at Nippori Station.

== Station layout ==
The station has consists of one elevated island platform connected to the station building by an underground passageway. It is staffed.

=== Platforms ===
1	■ Joban Line ( Ueno-Tokyo Line)	for Hitachi, Katsuta, Mito, Tomobe, Ishioka, Tsuchiura, Ueno, Tokyo and Shinagawa
1	■ Mito Line	for Hitachi, Katsuta, Mito, Tomobe, Kasama, Shimodate and Oyama
2	■ Jōban Line	for Takahagi, Isohara, Iwaki, Tomioka and Haranomachi

== History ==
Jūō Station was opened on 25 February 1897 as Kawajiri Station (川尻駅). The station was absorbed into the JR East network upon the privatization of the Japanese National Railways (JNR) on 1 April 1987. It was renamed to its present name on 13 March 2004.

== Passenger statistics ==
In fiscal 2019, the station was used by an average of 2957 passengers daily (boarding passengers only).

== Surrounding area ==
- Jūō Post Office

== See also ==
- List of railway stations in Japan
