= Juo =

Juo or JUO may refer to:

- Junior Under Officer, a military appointment in some Commonwealth countries
- Jūō, Ibaraki
  - Jūō Station
- Jiba language
- Joint Urban Operations
