= Hanakawa, Ibaraki =

Dissolved municipality in Ibaraki prefecture, Japan

Hanakawa (華川村, Hanakawa-mura) was a village located in Taga District, Ibaraki, Japan.

== History ==
On April 1, 1889, Hanakawa village was formed by the merger of three villages in Shimosōda, Kuruma, Nakatsuma, Kamikotsuda, Simokotsuda, Azuhata, Usuba and Hanazono.

On April 1, 1955, Hanakawa village merged with Isohara town to form Isohara town.

On March 31, 1956, Isohara town merged with Ōtsu town, Hiragata town, Minaminakagō village, Sekinami village, and Sekimoto village, to form Kitaibaraki city.

== Population changes ==
=== Population ===
- 1891 - 2,274
- 1902 - 2,364
- 1920 - 6,778
- 1935 - 4,917
- 1947 - 6,850
- 1950 - 7,580

=== Number of households ===
- 1920 - 1,675
- 1935 - 1,097
- 1947 - 1,426
- 1950 - 1,537
