= Isohara, Ibaraki =

Dissolved municipality in Ibaraki prefecture, Japan

Isohara (磯原町, Isohara-machi) was a town located in Taga District, Ibaraki, Japan.

== History ==
On April 1, 1889, Kitanakagō village was formed by the merger of Toyoda, Isohara, Ōtsuka, Kamisōda and Utsuno.

On January 1, 1925, Kitanakagō village was renamed Isohara town.

On April 1, 1955, Hanakawa village merged with Isohara Town.

On March 31, 1956, Isohara town merged with Ōtsu town, Hiragata town, Minaminakagō village, Sekinami village, and Sekimoto village, to form Kitaibaraki city.

== Population changes ==
=== Population ===
- 1891 - 2,932
- 1902 - 4,007
- 1920 - 10,265
- 1924 - 9,089
- 1935 - 9,342
- 1950 - 13,692

=== Number of households ===
- 1920 - 2,427
- 1924 - 2,225
- 1935 - 2,064
- 1950 - 2,756
