= Hitachi, Ibaraki =

Hitachi 日立市
- City
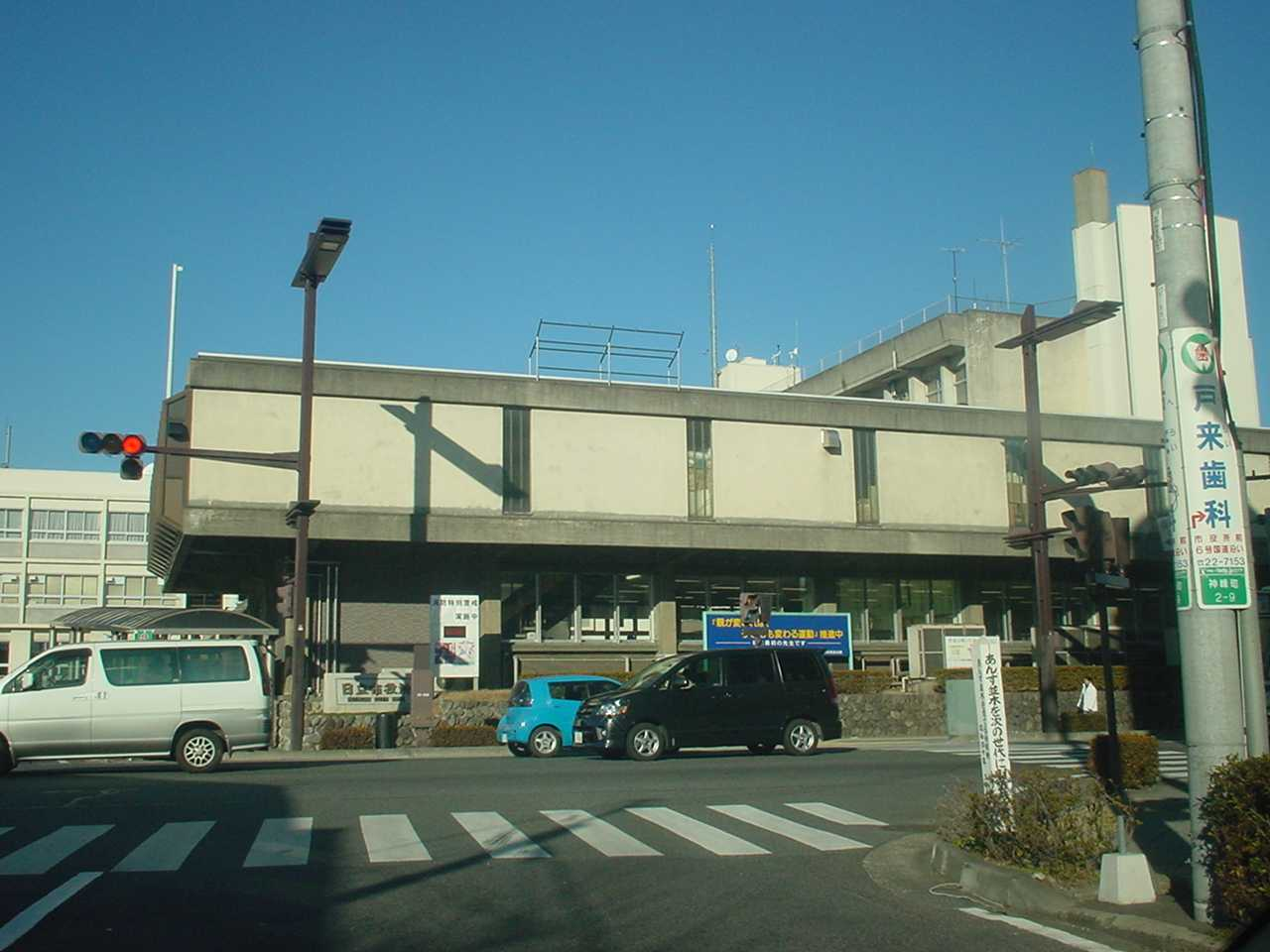
- Hitachi city hall

- Flag Seal

- Location of Hitachi Mito in Ibaraki Prefecture

- Coordinates: 36°35′56.9″N 140°39′5.4″E
- Country: Japan
- Region: Kantō
- Prefecture: Ibaraki

Government
  - Mayor: Haruki Ogawa (since April 2015)

Area
  - Total: 225.71 km^{2} (87.15 sq mi)

Population (January 2024)
  - Total: 165,822
  - Density: 734.67/km^{2} (1,902.8/sq mi)
- Time zone: UTC+9 (Japan Standard Time)
- Phone number: 0294-22-3111
- Address: 1-1-1 Sukegawa-chō, Hitachi-shi, Ibaraki-ken 317-8601
- Climate: Cfa
- Website: Official website
- Symbols
- Bird: Japanese cormorant
- Fish: Giant Pacific octopus
- Flower: Sakura
- Tree: Zelkova serrata

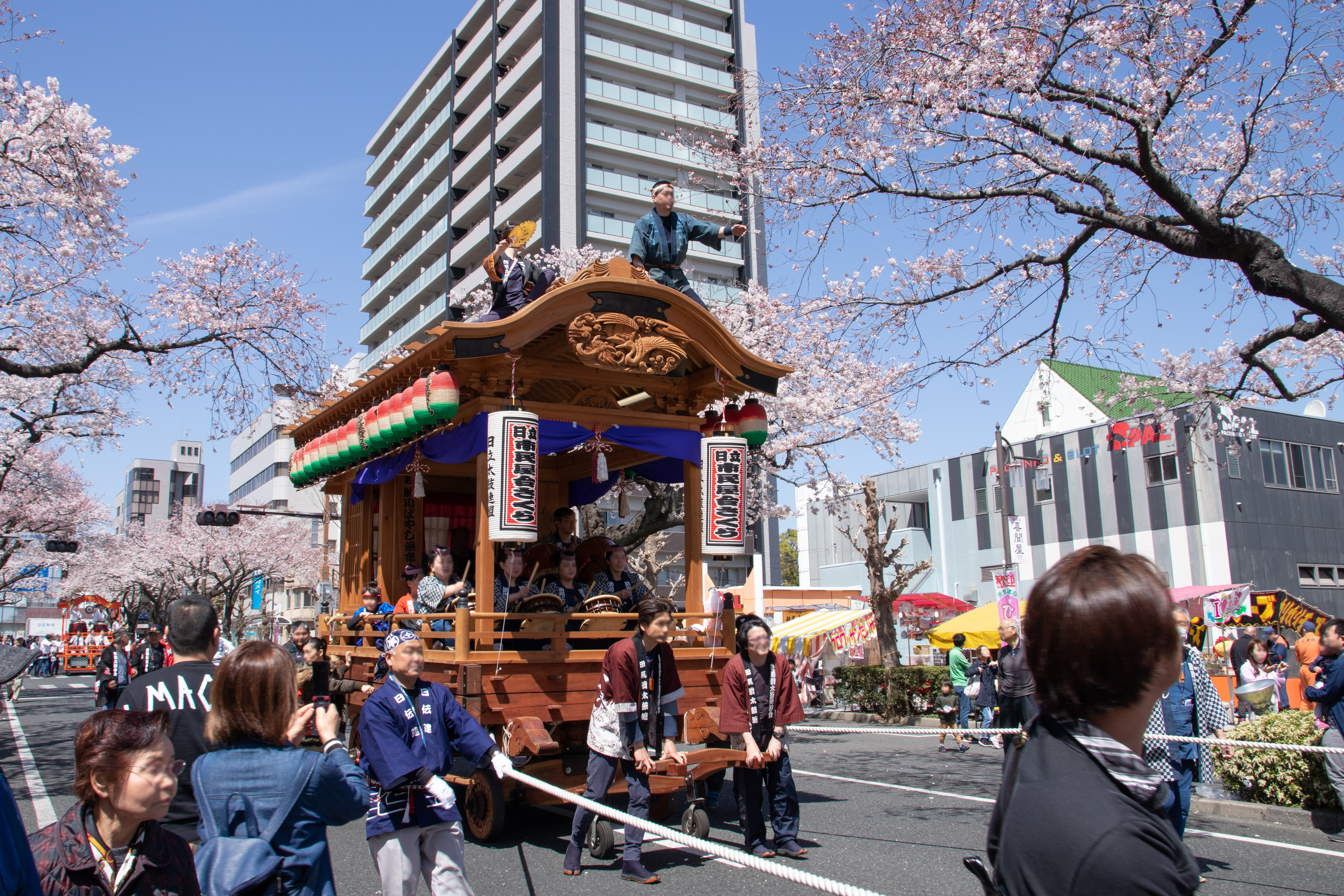
Hitachi Sakura Festival

Hitachi (日立市, Hitachi-shi; Japanese pronunciation: [çi̥.tä̀.c̟͡ɕì, -tä́.c̟͡ɕì, -tä́.c̟͡ɕi̥.ɕì]) is a city located in Ibaraki Prefecture, Japan. As of 1 January 2024, the city had an estimated population of 165,822 in 76,702 households and a population density of 735 persons per km^{2}. The percentage of the population aged over 65 was 32.7%. The total area of the city is 225.71 square kilometres (87.15 sq mi). Hitachi is well known in the world for its brand name of electric products, including power plants and appliances, of the Hitachi company founded in the town in 1910 by Namihei Odaira with considerable properties as its factories in the city.

== Geography ==
Located in northern Ibaraki Prefecture, Hitachi has a long coast along the Pacific Ocean to the east. Japan National Route 6 runs in parallel with the coast, connecting Tokyo and Sendai, and develops residential and commercial areas in the relatively narrow land of the coastal plain. Geologically the city covers Cambrian basement, some 500 million years old, with marble being quarried in the west for manufacturing cement material.

=== Surrounding municipalities ===
Ibaraki Prefecture

- Hitachiōta
- Naka
- Takahagi
- Tōkai

=== Climate ===
Hitachi has a humid subtropical climate (Köppen Cfa) characterized by warm summers and cold winters with heavy snowfall. The average annual temperature in Hitachi is 14.3 °C (57.7 °F). The average annual rainfall is 1,455.7 mm (57.31 in) with October as the wettest month. The temperatures are highest on average in August, at around 25.0 °C (77.0 °F), and lowest in January, at around 4.6 °C (40.3 °F).

Climate data for Hitachi (1991−2020 normals, extremes 1978−present)
Month	Jan	Feb	Mar	Apr	May	Jun	Jul	Aug	Sep	Oct	Nov	Dec	Year
Record high °C (°F)	17.2 (63.0)	23.2 (73.8)	25.0 (77.0)	29.1 (84.4)	30.6 (87.1)	33.6 (92.5)	37.4 (99.3)	37.0 (98.6)	35.8 (96.4)	33.5 (92.3)	24.9 (76.8)	24.7 (76.5)	37.4 (99.3)
Mean daily maximum °C (°F)	9.1 (48.4)	9.2 (48.6)	11.8 (53.2)	16.3 (61.3)	20.2 (68.4)	23.0 (73.4)	26.9 (80.4)	28.5 (83.3)	25.6 (78.1)	20.8 (69.4)	16.3 (61.3)	11.5 (52.7)	18.3 (64.9)
Daily mean °C (°F)	4.6 (40.3)	4.8 (40.6)	7.5 (45.5)	12.1 (53.8)	16.3 (61.3)	19.6 (67.3)	23.4 (74.1)	25.0 (77.0)	22.0 (71.6)	17.1 (62.8)	12.1 (53.8)	7.2 (45.0)	14.3 (57.8)
Mean daily minimum °C (°F)	0.2 (32.4)	0.4 (32.7)	3.1 (37.6)	7.8 (46.0)	12.6 (54.7)	16.6 (61.9)	20.6 (69.1)	22.3 (72.1)	19.1 (66.4)	13.6 (56.5)	8.0 (46.4)	2.8 (37.0)	10.6 (51.1)
Record low °C (°F)	−6.2 (20.8)	−6.9 (19.6)	−3.7 (25.3)	−1.9 (28.6)	3.7 (38.7)	9.1 (48.4)	13.0 (55.4)	15.2 (59.4)	10.8 (51.4)	3.7 (38.7)	−1.1 (30.0)	−3.9 (25.0)	−6.9 (19.6)
Average precipitation mm (inches)	56.4 (2.22)	52.4 (2.06)	107.4 (4.23)	131.4 (5.17)	164.2 (6.46)	159.8 (6.29)	162.6 (6.40)	125.4 (4.94)	179.1 (7.05)	188.5 (7.42)	78.8 (3.10)	49.8 (1.96)	1,455.7 (57.31)
Average precipitation days (≥ 1.0 mm)	5.2	5.6	9.6	10.6	11.3	12.4	12.5	8.6	11.0	11.0	7.0	5.6	110.4
Mean monthly sunshine hours	200.0	184.9	187.7	189.5	181.4	136.3	153.7	179.2	138.2	144.1	161.1	186.6	2,046.8
Source: Japan Meteorological Agency

== Demographics ==
Per Japanese census data, the population of Hitachi peaked around 1980 and has steadily declined since.

Historical population
Year	Pop.	±%
1950	132,124	—
1960	172,232	+30.4%
1970	202,856	+17.8%
1980	215,489	+6.2%
1990	215,069	−0.2%
2000	206,589	−3.9%
2010	193,129	−6.5%
2020	174,508	−9.6%

== History ==
Human settlement in the Hitachi area dates to at least the Japanese Paleolithic period. In the early Nara period, the area was defined as part of Taga Province, which was then merged into Hitachi Province under the Ritsuryō system. By the Sengoku period, the area was under the control of the Satake clan. Following the creation of the Tokugawa shogunate, Tokugawa Ieyasu ordered the Satake to Dewa Province, and the area became part of the domain's awarded to Ieyasu's son Tokugawa Yorifusa. The area remained part of Mito Domain until the Meiji restoration.

The village of Hitachi was formed on April 1, 1889 with the establishment of the modern municipalities system. The area rapidly developed towards the end of the Meiji period under the direction of Fusanosuke Kuhara of the Kuhara zaibatsu with the opening of copper mines, and under Namihei Odaira, the founder of Hitachi. The village of Hitachi was raised to town status on August 26, 1924. Hitachi and the neighboring town of Sukegawa merged on September 1, 1939, to form the city of Hitachi.

The city suffered from major damage in World War II, from shore bombardment by the United States Navy on July 17, 1945, and in air raids on June 10 and July 19. Hitachi was an important military target, as it was a major industrial center, which containing numerous factories of the Hitachi zaibatsu, especially connected with the production of electrical equipment. It also had a copper mine that contained 1/10 of all of Japan's copper. Following an air raid on June 10 by the USAAF, which missed the Hitachi factories and burned down much of the civilian residential districts, the city was subjected to shore bombardment on July 19 by the battleships USS Iowa (BB-61), USS Missouri (BB-63), and USS Wisconsin (BB-64). However, the bombardment was very inaccurate, and although civilian casualties were very high, the Hitachi factories were again largely left intact. The shore bombardment was followed by a second air raid with incendiary bombs on July 19.

In 1976 the disassembled MiG-25 fighter jet that Soviet pilot Viktor Belenko had defected in was returned to the Soviet Union from the port of Hitachi. It had been extensively examined at the nearby Hyakuri Air Base.

The borders of Hitachi expanded in 1955–1956 through the annexation of the neighboring villages of Hidaka, Sakamoto, Higashiosawa, Nakasato, Toyoura, the towns of Taga and Kuji. The Hitachi Copper Mine closed in 1981.

On November 1, 2004, the neighboring town of Jūō (from Taga District) was merged into Hitachi.

The city suffered from minor damage in the 2011 Tōhoku earthquake and tsunami with no fatalities reported.

== Government ==
Hitachi has a mayor-council form of government with a directly elected mayor and a unicameral city council of 28 members. Hitachi contributes five members to the Ibaraki Prefectural Assembly. In terms of national politics, the city is part of Ibaraki 5th district of the lower house of the Diet of Japan.

== Economy ==
Hitachi is a major industrial center, and is the former location of the headquarters of Hitachi and various of its group companies.

== Education ==
- Ibaraki University – engineering department
- Ibaraki Christian University
- Hitachi has 24 public elementary schools and 14 public middle schools and one public compulsory education schools operated by the city government. There are also one private elementary school and one private combined middle/high school. The Ibaraki prefectural Board of Education operates five public high schools and one combined middle/high school, in addition to one special education school. There are also four private high schools in the city.
- The Hitachi council has been providing Hitachi original school bag to all the year 1 elementary school students since 1975. The students have option to choose from black or red randoseru. Hitachi council has donated over 100,000 bags and one of the very rare council who does this and often get TV coverage on this.

== Transportation ==
=== Railway ===
JR East – Jōban Line

- Ōmika – Hitachi-Taga – Hitachi – Ogitsu – Jūō

=== Highway ===
- Jōban Expressway – Hitachi-Minamiota Interchange, Hitachi-Chuo Interchange, Hitachi-Kita Interchange
- National Route 6
- National Route 245
- National Route 293
- National Route 349
- National Route 461

== Local attractions ==
- Kamine Zoo
- Yoshida Tadashi Memorial Museum of Music

== Sister cities ==
- Birmingham, Alabama, United States
- Tauranga, Bay Of Plenty, New Zealand
- Kiryu, Gunma, Japan
- Yamanobe, Yamagata, Japan

== Notable people from Hitachi ==
- Hiromitsu Agatsuma, musician
- Tsubasa Aizawa, professional baseball player
- Yukihisa Fujita, politician
- Motoharu Kurosawa, racing driver
- Daishi Nobuyuki, sumo wrestler (Real Name: Nobuyuki Takano, Nihongo: 高野信行, Takano Nobuyuki)
- Hironobu Sakaguchi, creator of Final Fantasy video game series
- Kuniaki Shibata, boxer
- Tagaryū Shōji, sumo wrestler (Real Name: Noboru Kurotani, Nihongo: 黒谷昇, Kurotani Noboru)
- Natsuo Yamaguchi, politician
