= Jūō, Ibaraki =

Dissolved municipality in Ibaraki prefecture, Japan

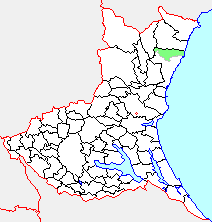
Map of Makabe, Ibaraki

Jūou (十王町, Jūou-machi) was a town located in Taga District, Ibaraki Prefecture, Japan.

As of 2003, the town had an estimated population of 13,373 and a density of 185.43 persons per km^{2}. The total area was 72.12 km^{2}.

On November 1, 2004, Jūō was merged into the expanded city of Hitachi and no longer exists as an independent municipality.
