= Ibaraki Christian University =

Private university in Hitachi, Ibaraki, Japan

Coordinates: 36°30′51.9″N 140°36′59.7″E

- 茨城キリスト教大学
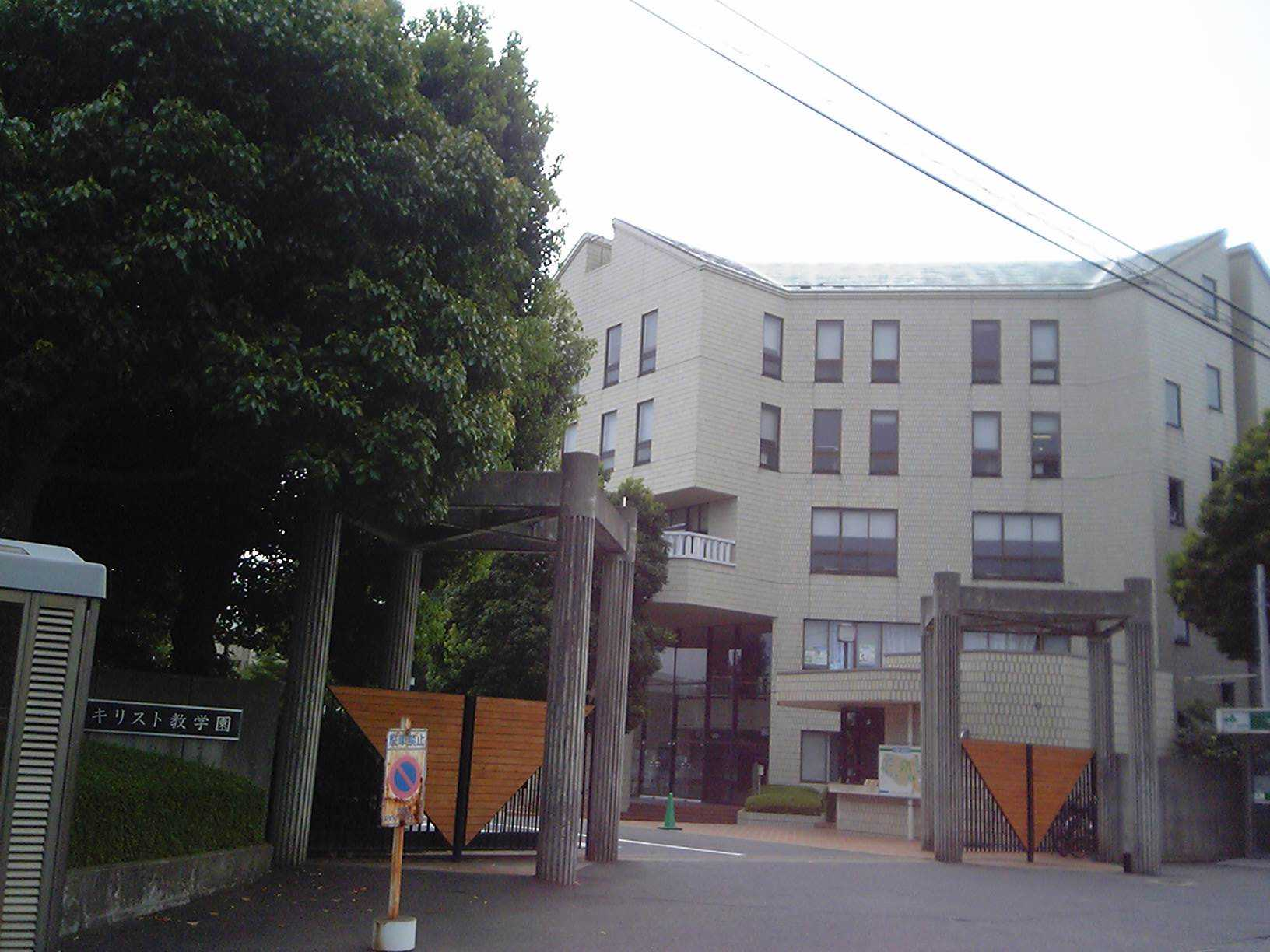
- Type: Private
- Established: 1967
- Location: Hitachi, Ibaraki, Japan
- Website: Official website

Ibaraki Christian University (茨城キリスト教大学, Ibaraki kirisuto-kyō daigaku) is a private university in Hitachi, Ibaraki, Japan, established in 1967 and abbreviated as IC.

== History ==
The predecessor of the University, Ibaraki Christian College, was founded in 1948 as the Shion Campus. An associated Shion Junior College and Shion Senior High School were established in 1949. The Shion Junior College became the Ibaraki Christian Junior College in 1950 with a Department of Liberal Arts and Department of English, followed by a Department of Home Economics in 1951.

The four-year Ibaraki Christian College was established in 1967 with a Department of Biblical Studies and Department of English Language and Literature. A Department of Japanese Literature was added in 1974, followed by a Department of Elementary Education in 1987. A Graduate School was established in 1995. The school changed to its present name in the year 2000, and the Junior College was closed.

A College of Nursing was established in 2004 and College of Business Administration in 2011.

== External relations ==
Ibaraki Christian University has liaisons and student-exchange programs with a number of universities outside Japan. These include Oklahoma Christian University, with which McMillan was also involved.

The institution has had an international focus from its inception.
