= Taga District =

Former district in Ibaraki prefecture, Japan

Taga (多賀郡, Taga-gun) was a district located in Ibaraki, Japan.

On November 1, 2004, the town of Jūō was merged into the neighboring and expanding city of Hitachi. Therefore, the Taga District was dissolved as a result of this merger.

As of 2003, the district had an estimated population of 13,373 and a density of 185.43 persons per km^{2}. The total area was 72.12 km^{2}.

== Towns and villages ==
Prior to November 1, 2004, the district included:

- Jūō
