= Japan National Route 245 =

Road in Ibaraki prefecture, Japan

National Route 245
- 国道245号
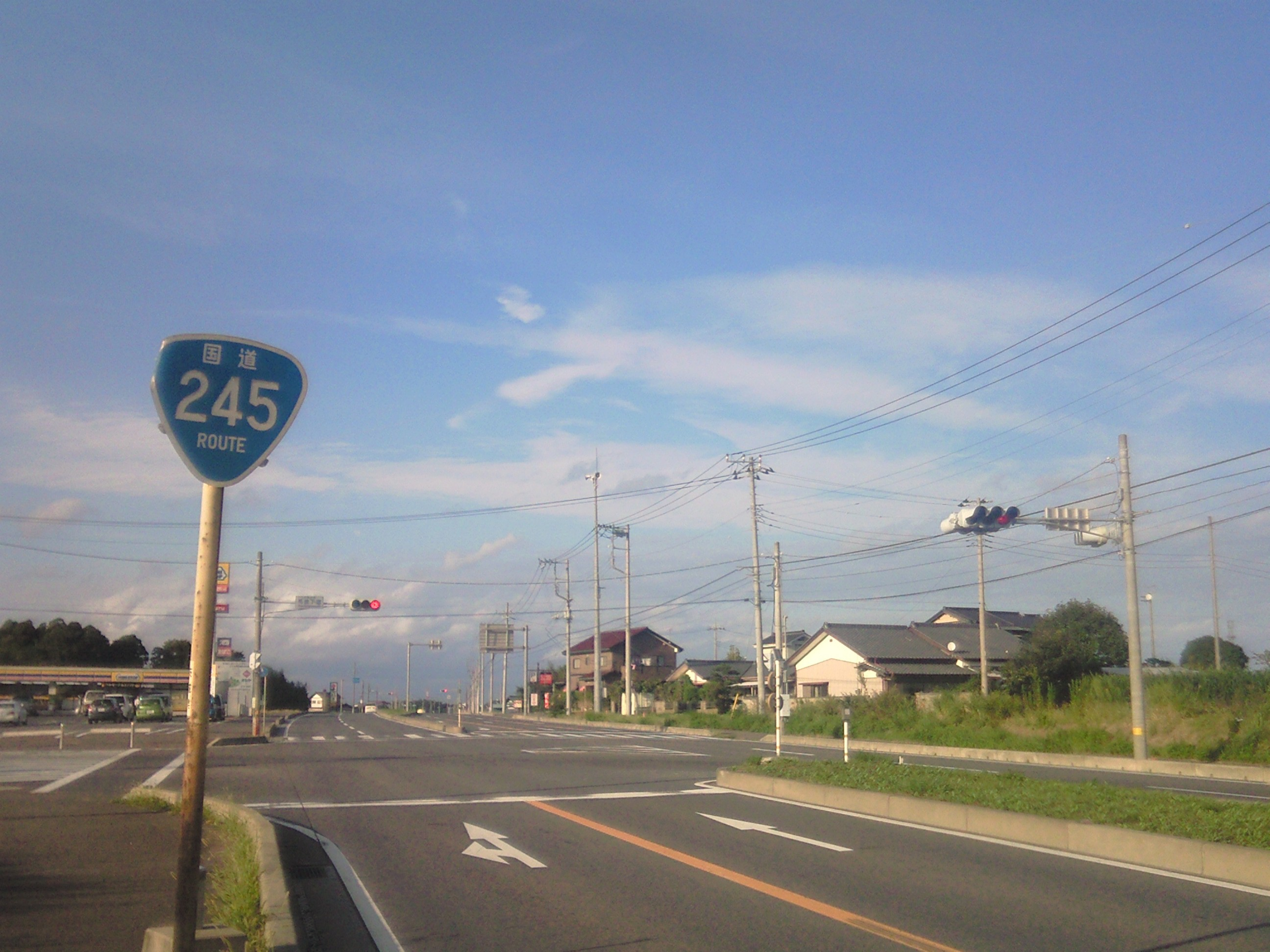

Route information
- Length: 42.6 km (26.5 mi)
- Existed: 10 July 1956–present

Major junctions
- North end: National Route 6 in Hitachi
- South end: National Route 50 in Mito

Location
- Country: Japan

Highway system
- National highways of Japan; Expressways of Japan
← National Route 244	→ National Route 246

National Route 245 is a national highway of Japan connecting Mito and Hitachi in Ibaraki prefecture, with a total length of 42.6 km (26.47 mi).
