= Katsuta Station =

Railway station in Hitachinaka, Ibaraki Prefecture, Japan

Katsuta Station 勝田駅
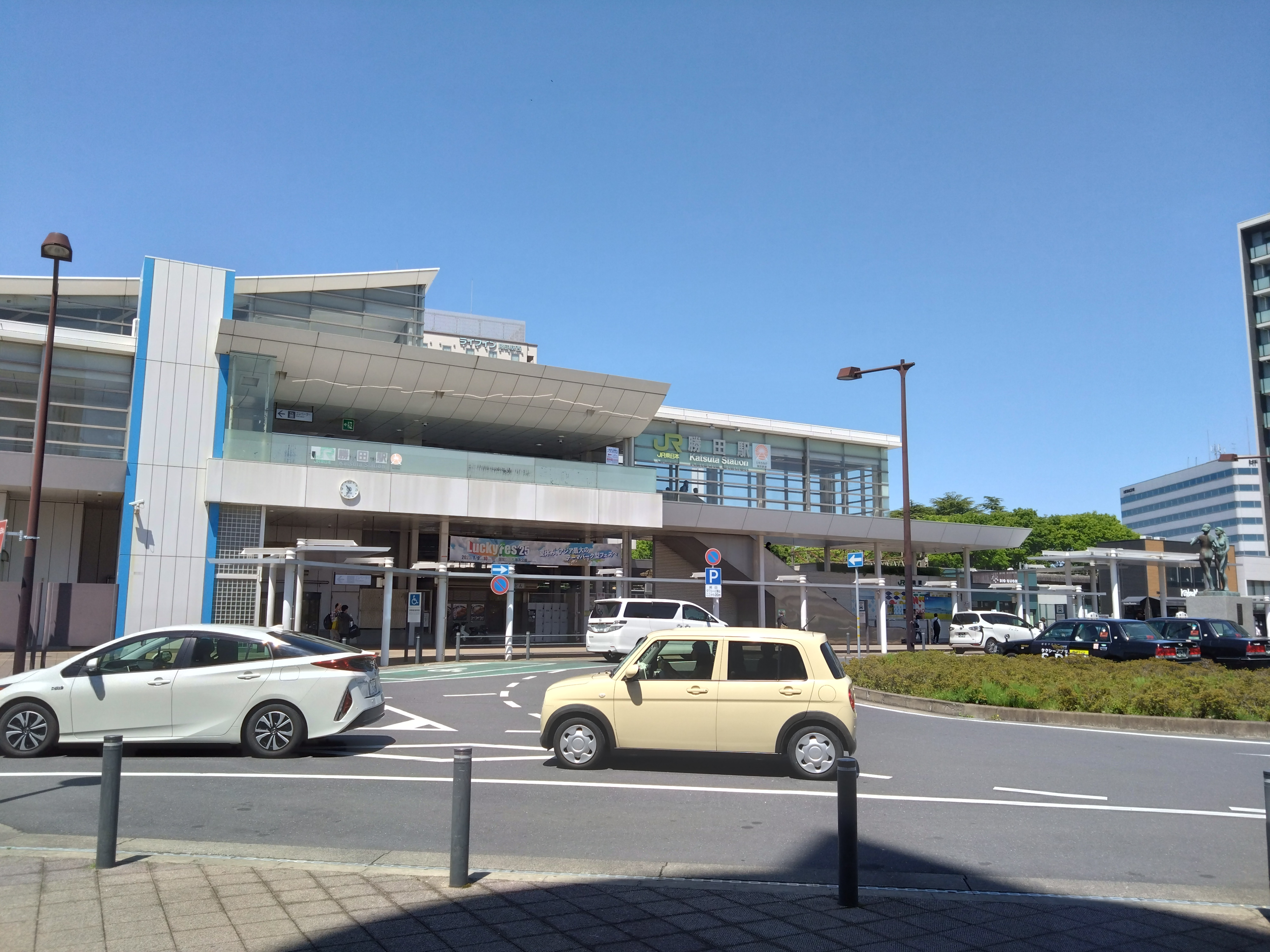
- The station building in 2025

General information
- Location: 1-1 Katsuta-Chuo, Hitachinaka-shi, Ibaraki-ken 312-0045; Japan
- Coordinates: 36.3938°N 140.5246°E
- Operator: JR East; Hitachinaka Seaside Railway
- Lines: ■ Jōban Line; ■ Minato Line
- Distance: 121.1 km from Nippori
- Platforms: 2 island platforms

Other information
- Status: Staffed ( Midori no Madoguchi )
- Website: Official website

History
- Opened: 18 March 1910; 116 years ago

Passengers
- FY2019: 13,586 daily

Services
Preceding station	JR East	Following station
Mito towards Shinagawa	Hitachi	Tōkai (limited service) towards Sendai
Mito towards Shinagawa	Tokiwa	Tōkai towards Takahagi
Mito towards Shinagawa	Jōban Line Local-Futsuu	Sawa towards Sendai
Preceding station	Hitachinaka Seaside Railway	Following station
Terminus	Minato Line	Kōkimae towards Ajigaura
Location
- Location within Ibaraki Prefecture Location within Japan

Katsuta Station (勝田駅, Katsuta-eki) is a junction passenger railway station inn the city of Hitachinaka, Ibaraki, Japan, operated by East Japan Railway Company (JR East) and the third-sector railway operator Hitachinaka Seaside Railway.

== Lines ==
Katsuta Station is served by the Jōban Line from Ueno in Tokyo, and is located 121.1 km from the official starting point of the line at Nippori Station. It is also the terminus of the 14.3 km single-track Hitachinaka Seaside Railway Minato Line to Ajigaura.

== Station layout ==
The station consists of two island platforms. The station building is elevated and is located above the platforms. The station has a Midori no Madoguchi staffed ticket office.

=== Platforms ===
1	■ Minato Line	for Nakaminato and Ajigaura
2/3	■ Jōban Line ( Ueno-Tokyo Line)	for Mito, Tomobe, Ishioka, Tsuchiura, Ueno, Tokyo and Shinagawa
2/3	■ Mito Line	for Mito, Tomobe, Kasama, Shimodate, and Oyama
4	■ Jōban Line	for Hitachi, Takahagi, Iwaki, Haranomachi and Sendai

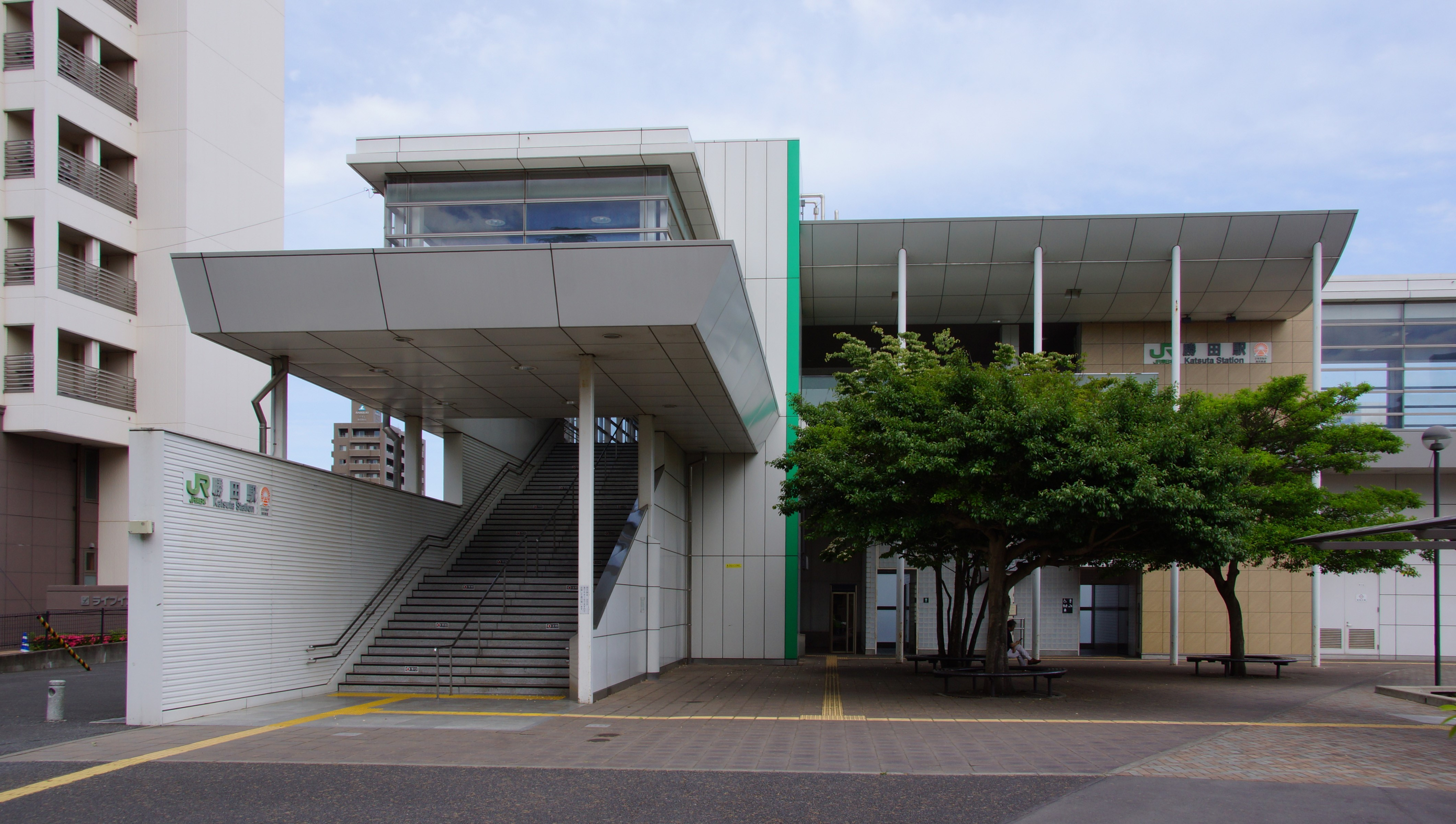
The west side of the station in June 2017

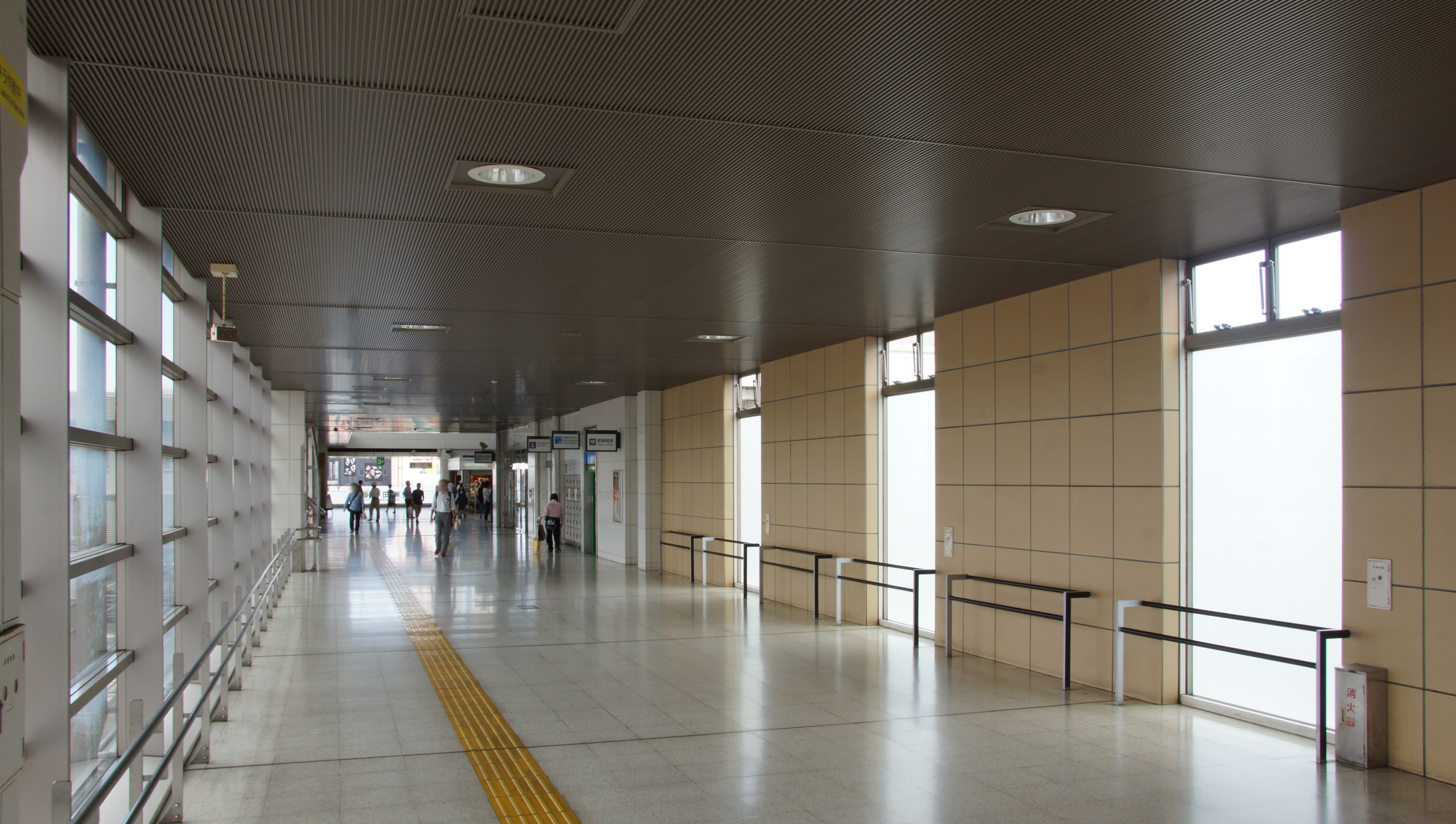
The passageway linking the east and west sides of the station in June 2017

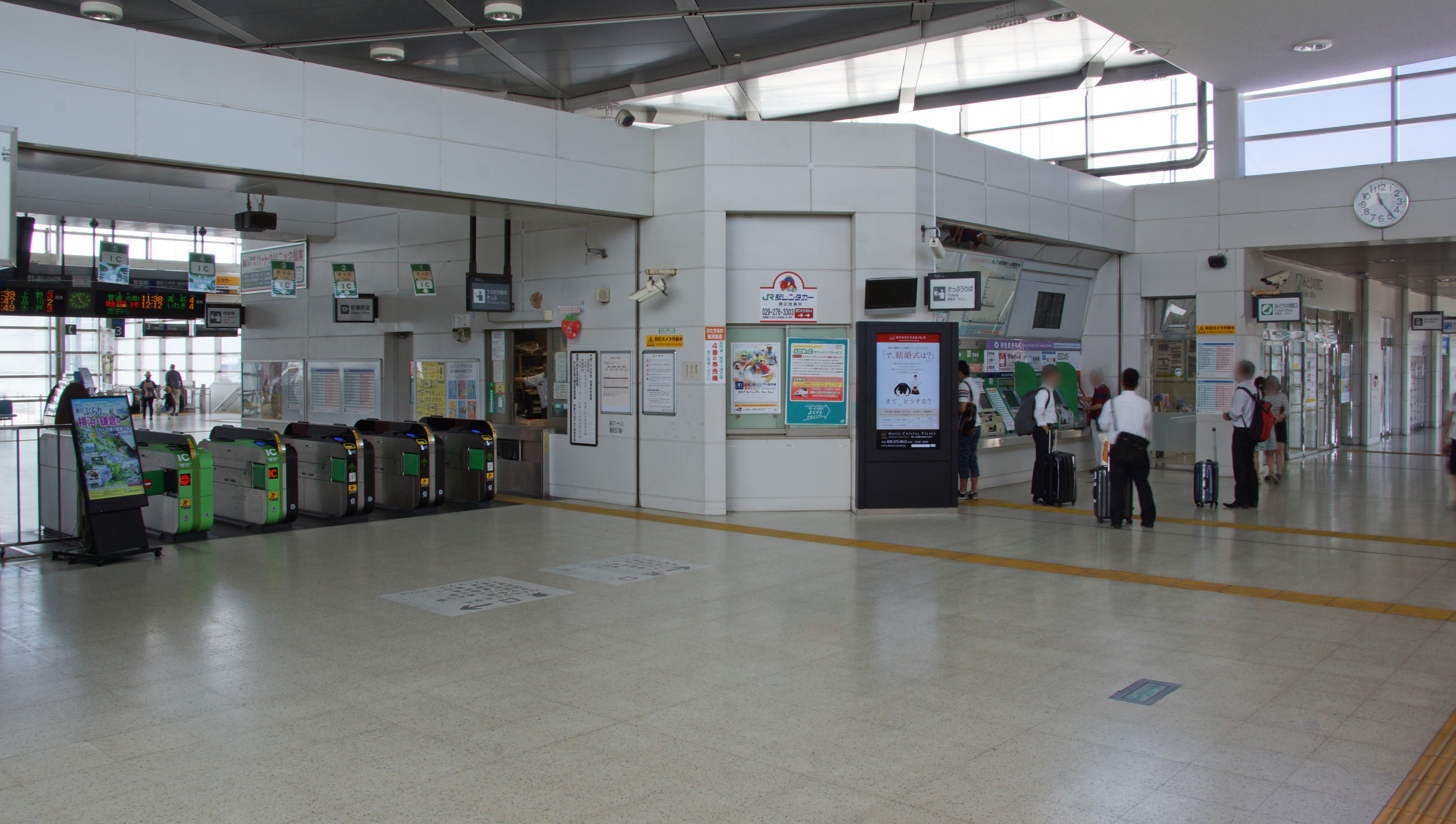
The ticket barriers in June 2017

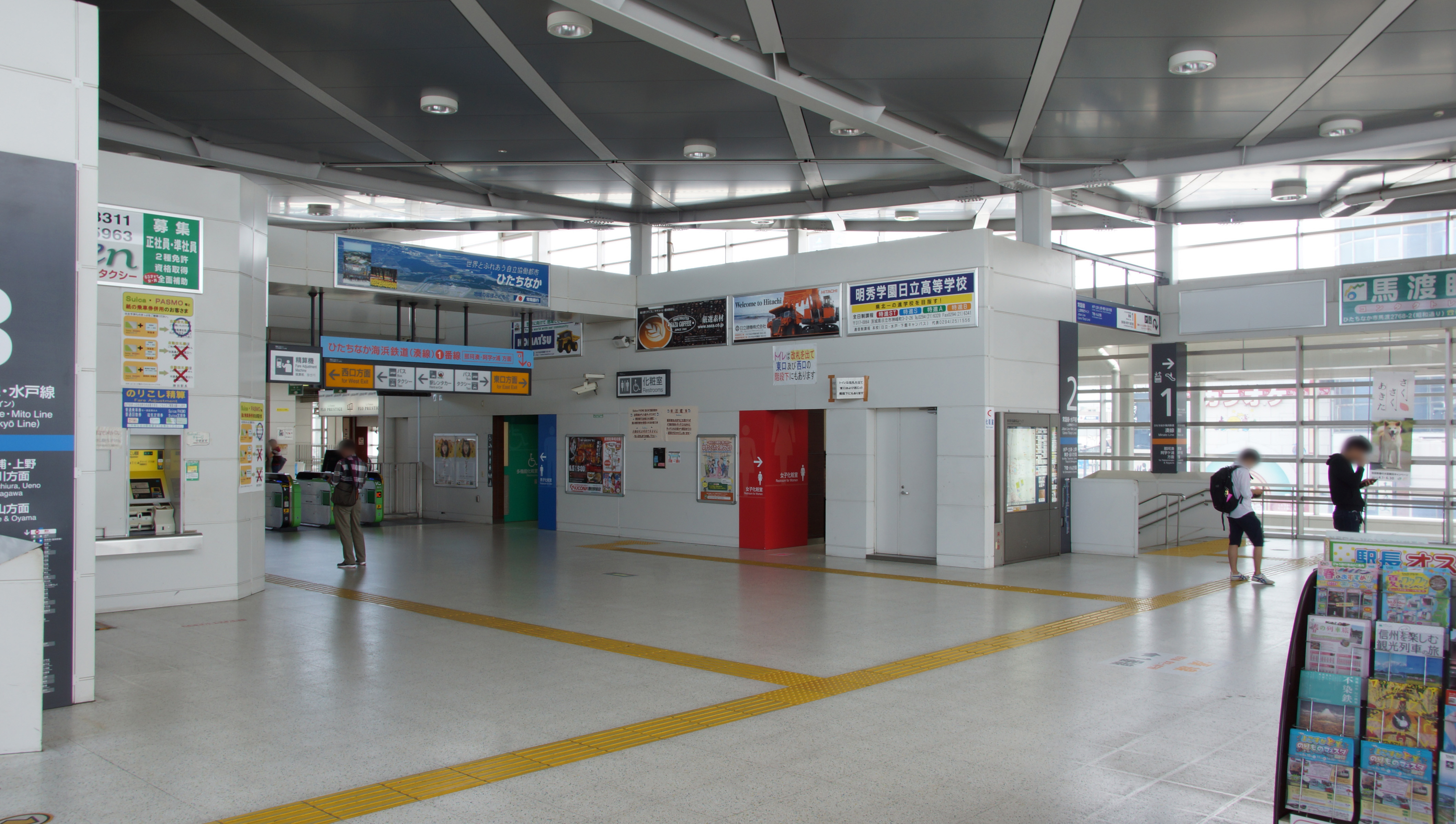
The inner concourse in June 2017

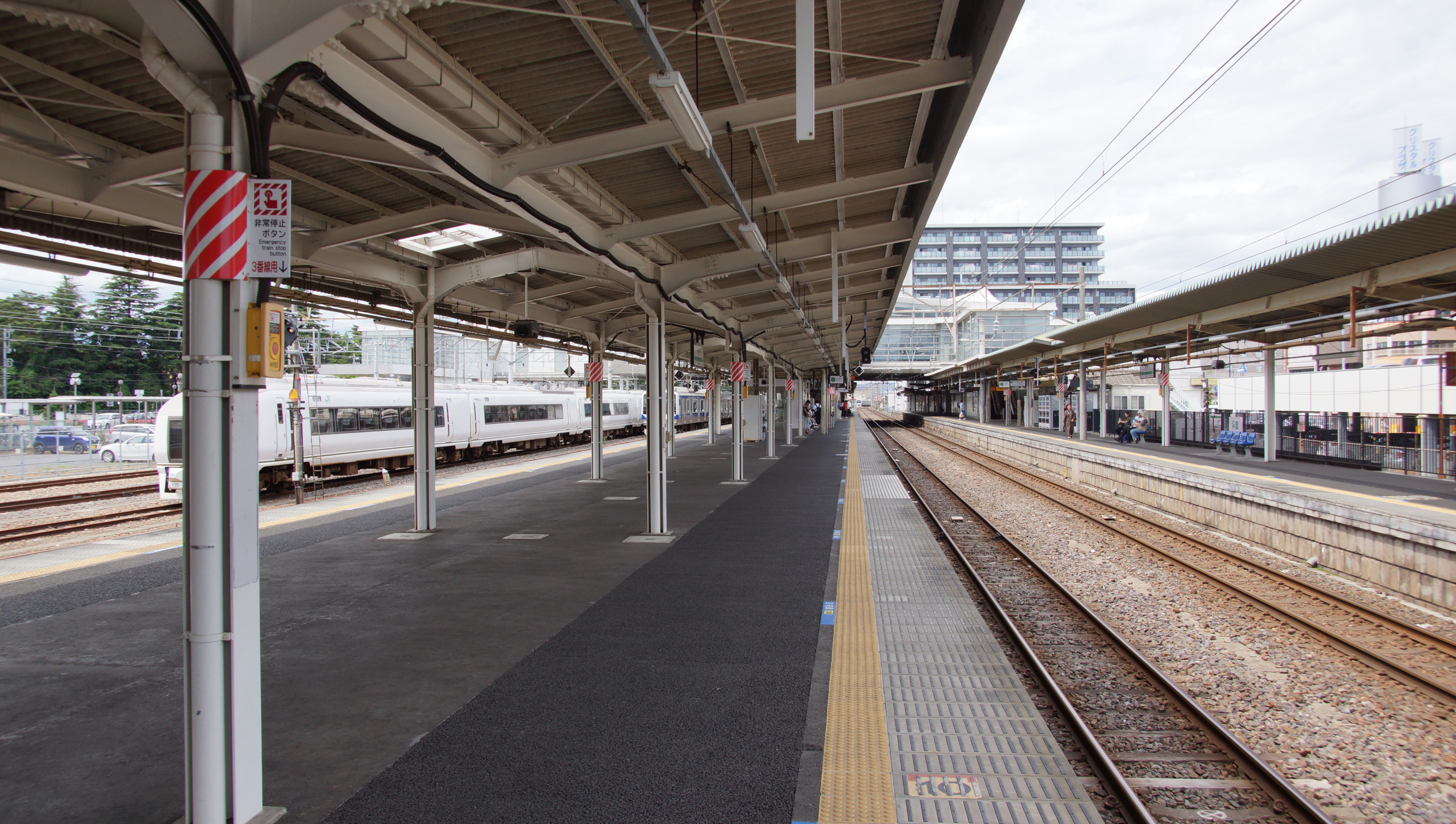
The platforms in June 2017, looking north, with platform 2 on the right

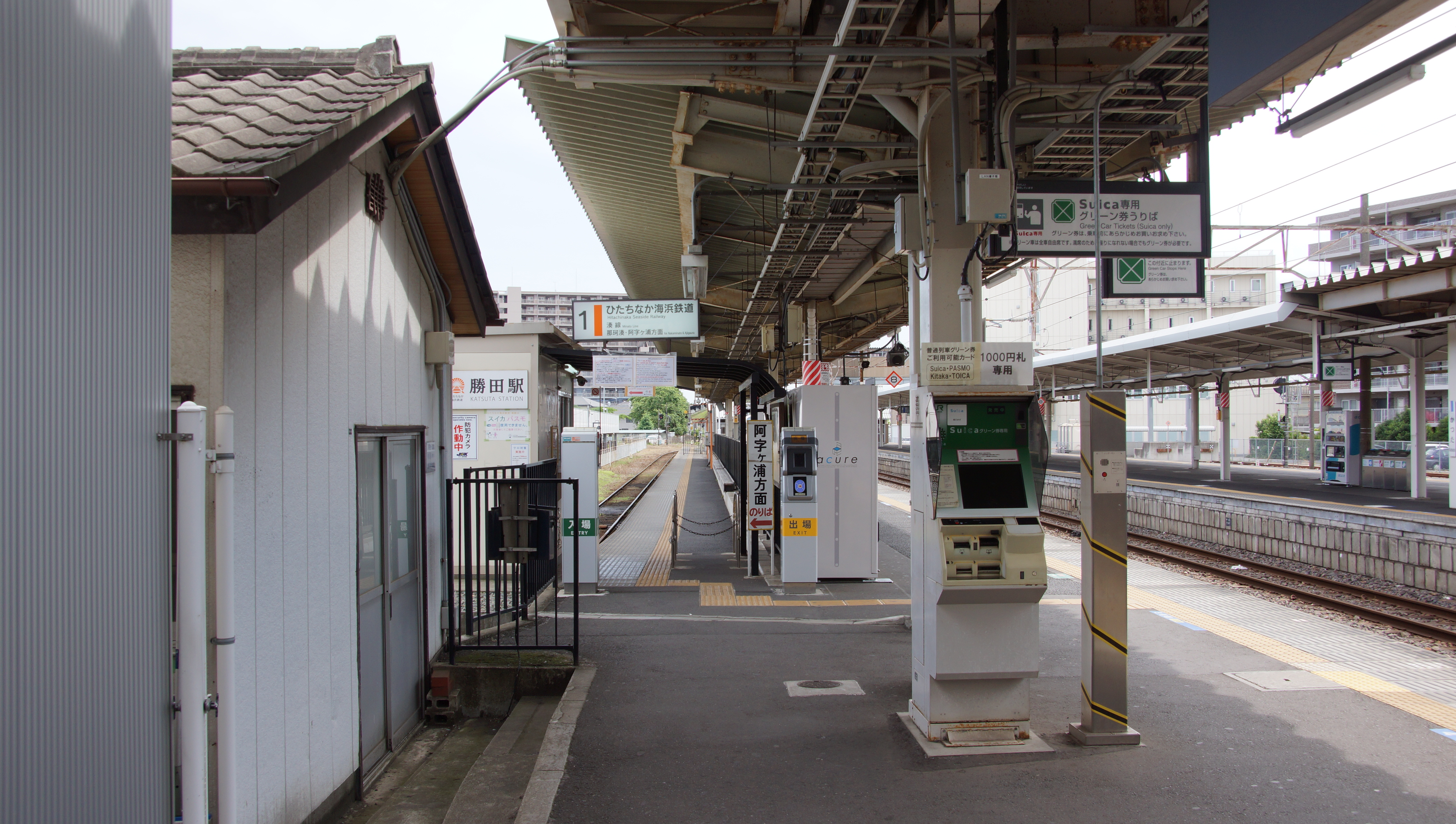
The entrance to the Hitachinaka Seaside Railway platform in June 2017

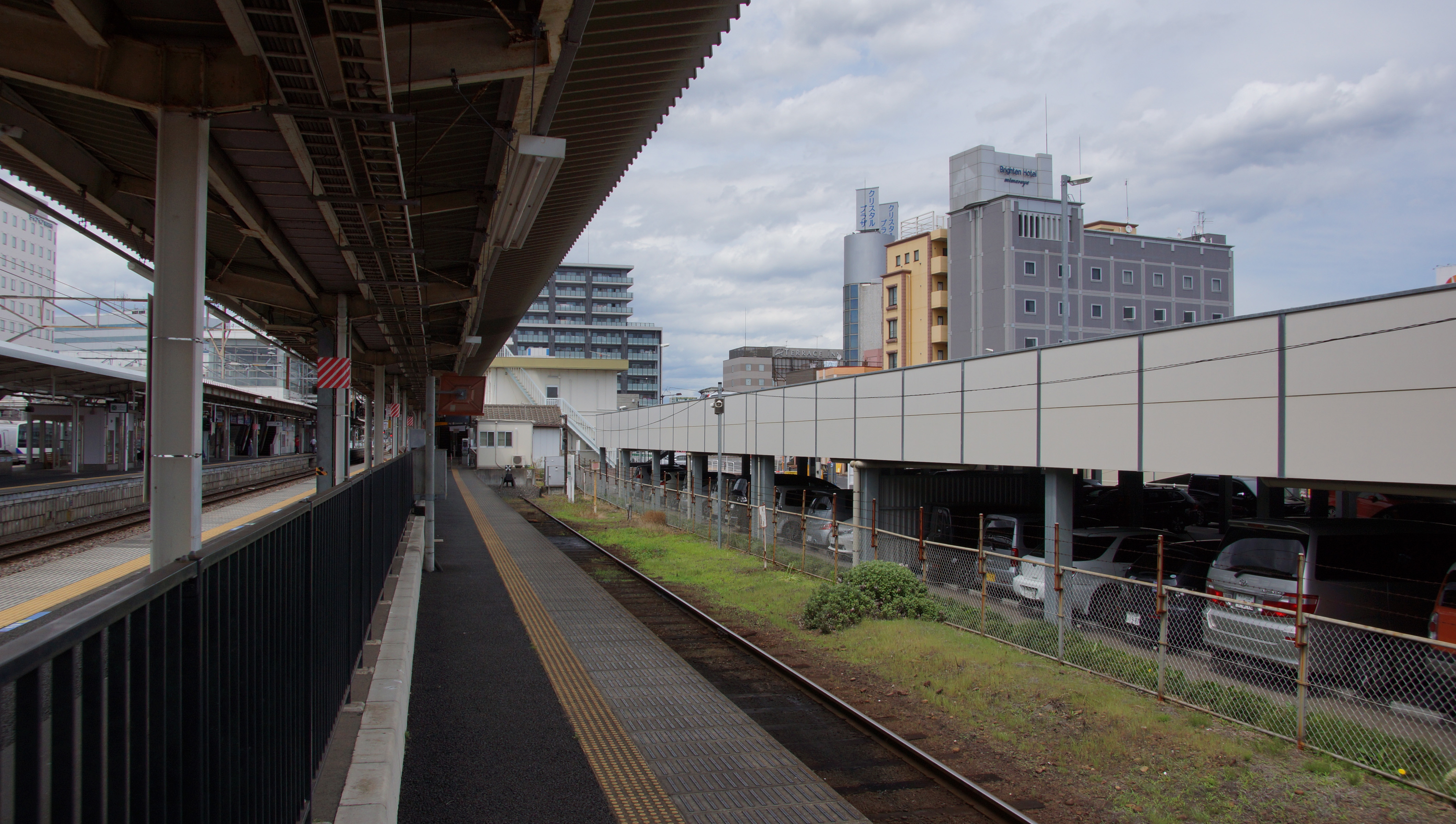
The Hitachinaka Seaside Railway platform in June 2017

== History ==
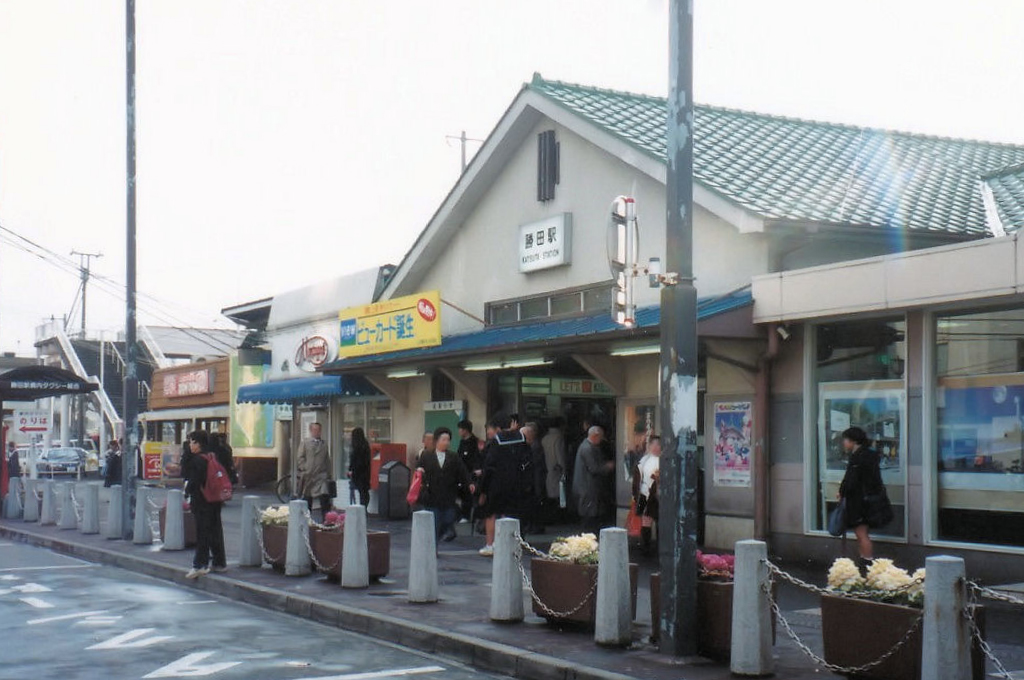
The station in March 1993, before rebuilding

The JR East (formerly JNR) Katsuta Station opened on 18 March 1910. The Hitachinaka Seaside Railway (formerly Minato Railway) station opened on 25 December 1913. The station was absorbed into the JR East network upon the privatization of Japanese National Railways (JNR) on 1 April 1987.

== Passenger statistics ==
In fiscal 2019, the JR portion of the station was used by an average of 13,586 passengers daily (boarding passengers only). The Hitachinaka Seaside Railway station was used by an average of 834 passengers daily in fiscal 2011. The JR East passenger figures for previous years are as shown below.

Fiscal year	Daily average
2000	12,723
2005	11,876
2010	11,817
2015	12,936

== Surrounding area ==
- Hitachi Seaside Park
- Hitachinaka City Hall
- Hitachinaka Post Office
- Hitachinaka General Hospital

== See also ==
- List of railway stations in Japan
