= Hitachi Station =

Railway station in Hitachi, Ibaraki Prefecture, Japan

Hitachi Station 日立駅
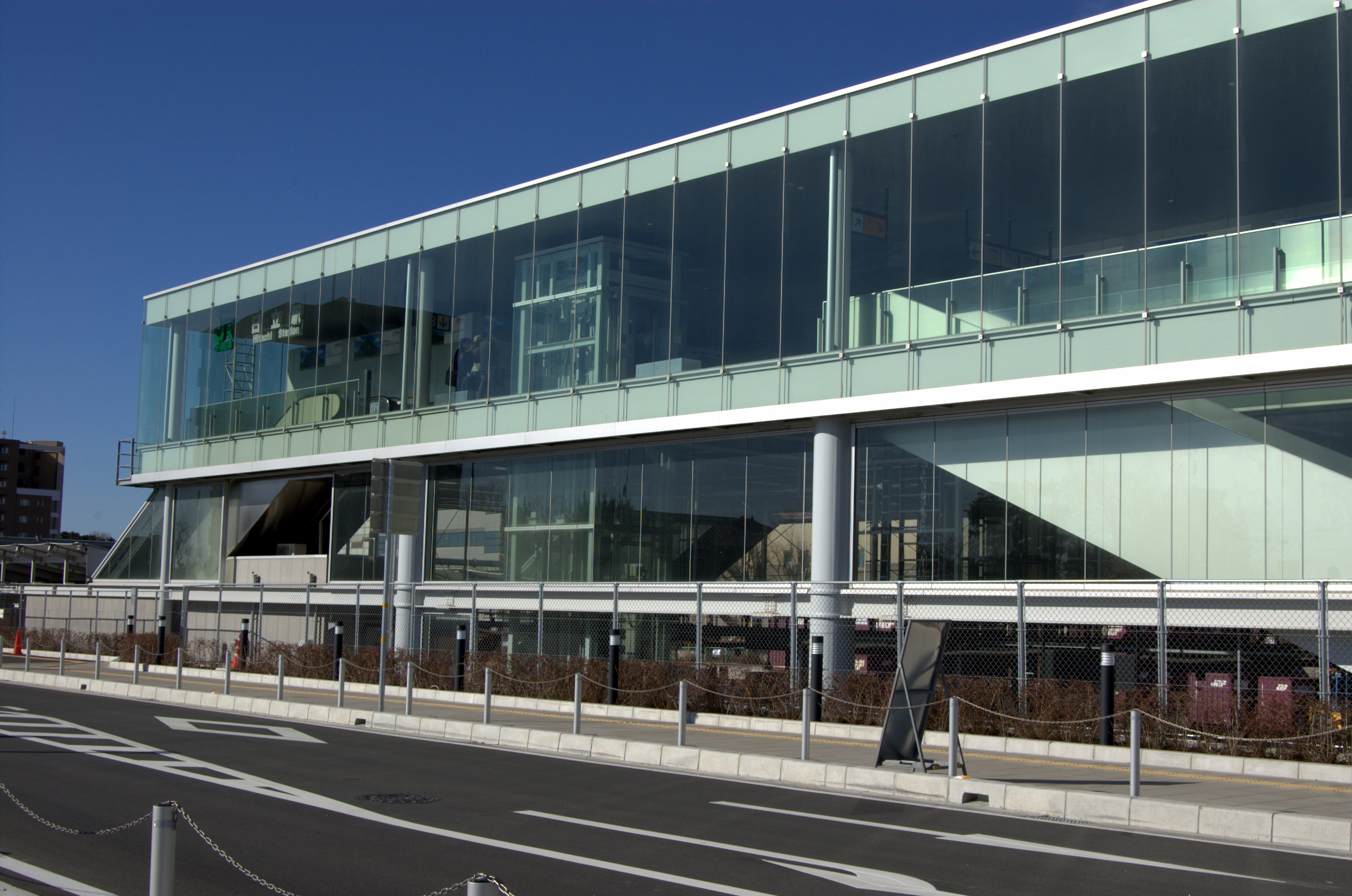
- Hitachi Station, February 2012

General information
- Location: Saiwai-cho 1-1-1, Hitachi-shi, Ibaraki-ken 317-0073; Japan
- Coordinates: 36.5902°N 140.6616°E
- Operator: JR East; JR Freight
- Line: ■ Jōban Line
- Distance: 146.9 km from Nippori
- Platforms: 1 side + 1 island platform

Other information
- Status: Staffed (Midori no Madoguchi)
- Website: Official website

History
- Opened: 25 February 1897; 129 years ago
- Former names: Sukagawa (until 1939)

Passengers
- FY2019: 10,789 daily

Services
Preceding station	JR East	Following station
Hitachi-Taga (limited service) towards Shinagawa	Hitachi	Takahagi (limited service) towards Sendai
Hitachi-Taga towards Shinagawa	Tokiwa	Takahagi Terminus
Hitachi-Taga towards Shinagawa	Jōban Line Local-Futsuu	Ogitsu towards Sendai
Location
- Location within Ibaraki Prefecture Location within Japan

Hitachi Station (日立駅, Hitachi-eki) is a railway station located in the city of Hitachi, Ibaraki Prefecture, Japan operated by the East Japan Railway Company (JR East). It is also a freight depot for the Japan Freight Railway Company (JR Freight).

== Lines ==
Hitachi Station is served by the Jōban Line, and is located 146.9 km from the official starting point of the line at Nippori Station.

== Station layout ==
The station is an elevated station with one side platform and one island platform. The station has a Midori no Madoguchi staffed ticket office.

=== Platforms ===
1,2	■ Jōban Line	for Takahagi, Isohara, Iwaki, Tomioka, Namie, Haranomachi, Soma and Sendai
2,3	■ Joban Line ( Ueno-Tokyo Line)	for Katsuta, Mito, Tomobe, Ishioka, Tsuchiura, Ueno, Tokyo and Shinagawa
2,3	■ Mito Line	for Katsuta, Mito, Tomobe, Kasama, Shimodate, and Oyama

== History ==
Hitachi Station was opened on 25 February 1897 as Sukegawa Station (助川駅) . It was renamed to its present name on 20 October 1939. The station was absorbed into the JR East network upon the privatization of the Japanese National Railways (JNR) on 1 April 1987. The current station building was completed in April 2011.

== Passenger statistics ==
In fiscal 2019, the station was used by an average of 10,789 passengers daily (boarding passengers only).

== Surrounding area ==
- Hitachi City Hall
- Hitachi Post Office
- Mitsubishi Hitachi Power Systems, Ltd.

== See also ==
- List of railway stations in Japan
