= Takahagi Station =

Railway station in Takahagi, Ibaraki Prefecture, Japan

Takahagi Station 高萩駅
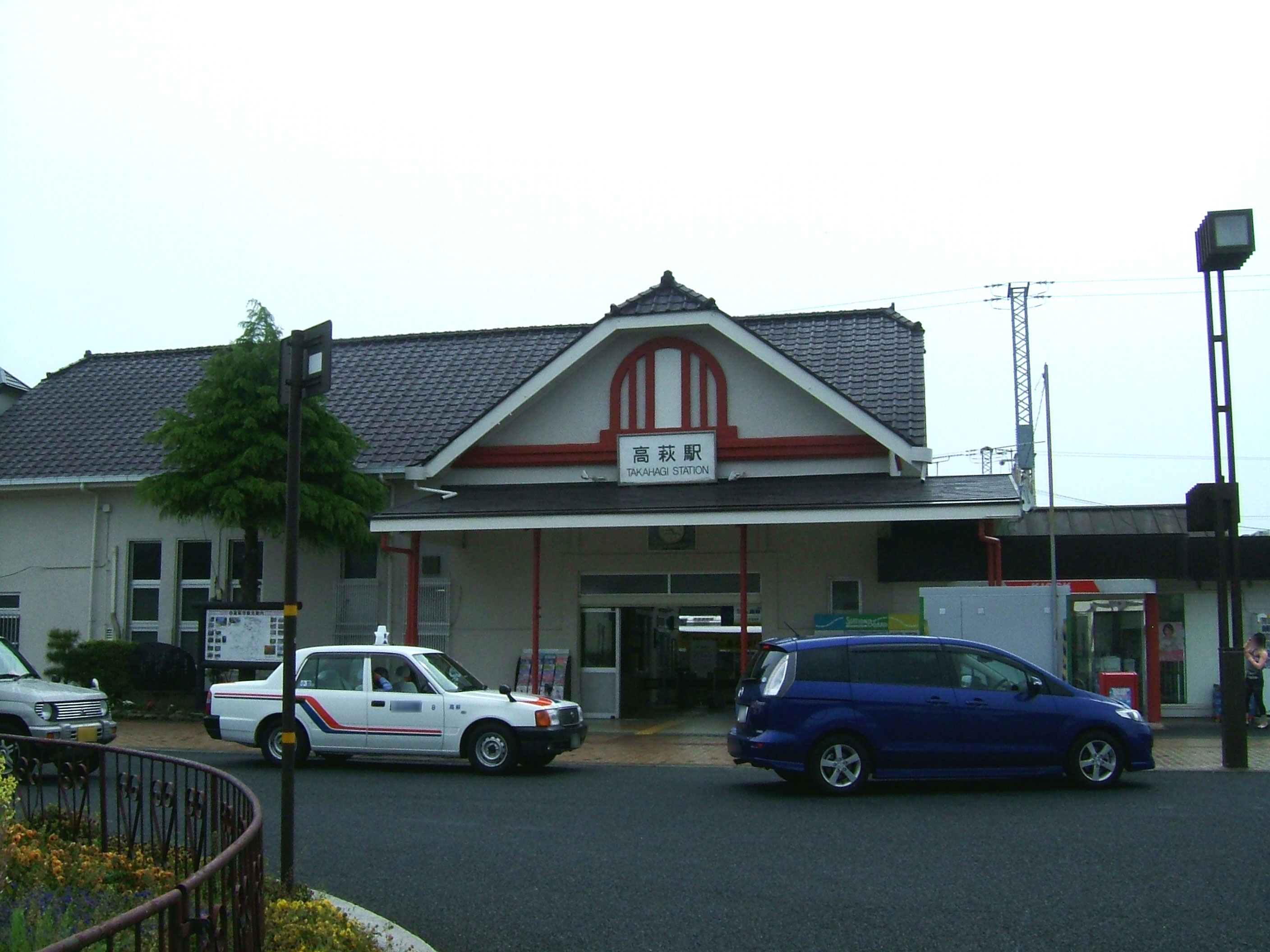
- Takahagi Station, March 2014

General information
- Location: 1928 Takahagi,[Takahagi-shi, Ibaraki-ken 318-0034; Japan
- Coordinates: 36.7138°N 140.7172°E
- Operator: JR East
- Line: ■ Joban Line
- Distance: 162.5 km from Nippori
- Platforms: 1 island platform

Other information
- Status: Staffed (Midori no Madoguchi)
- Website: Official website

History
- Opened: 25 February 1897; 129 years ago

Passengers
- FY2019: 2643 daily

Services
Preceding station	JR East	Following station
Hitachi towards Shinagawa	Hitachi (limited service)	Isohara (limited service) towards Sendai
Hitachi towards Shinagawa	Tokiwa	Terminus
Jūō towards Shinagawa	Jōban Line Local-Futsuu	Minami-Nakagō towards Sendai
Location
- Location within Ibaraki Prefecture Location within Japan

Takahagi Station (高萩駅, Takahagi-eki) is a passenger railway station in the city of Takahagi, Ibaraki Prefecture, Japan, operated by East Japan Railway Company (JR East).

== Lines ==
Takahagi Station is served by the Jōban Line, and is located 162.5 km from the official starting point of the line at Nippori Station in Tokyo.

== Station layout ==
The station consists of has one island platform connected to the station building by a footbridge. The station has a Midori no Madoguchi staffed ticket office.

=== Platforms ===
1	■ Jōban Line	for Isohara, Iwaki, Tomioka, Namie, Haranomachi and Sendai
2	■ Joban Line ( Ueno-Tokyo Line)	for Hitachi, Katsuta, Mito, Tomobe, Ishioka, Tsuchiura, Ueno, Tokyo and Shinagawa
2	■ Mito Line	for Hitachi, Katsuta, Mito, Tomobe, Kasama, Shimodate, and Oyama

== History ==
The station opened on 25 February 1897. The station was absorbed into the JR East network upon the privatization of the Japanese National Railways (JNR) on 1 April 1987. A new station building was completed in March 2014.

== Passenger statistics ==
In fiscal 2019, the station was used by an average of 2643 passengers daily (boarding passengers only).

== Gallery ==
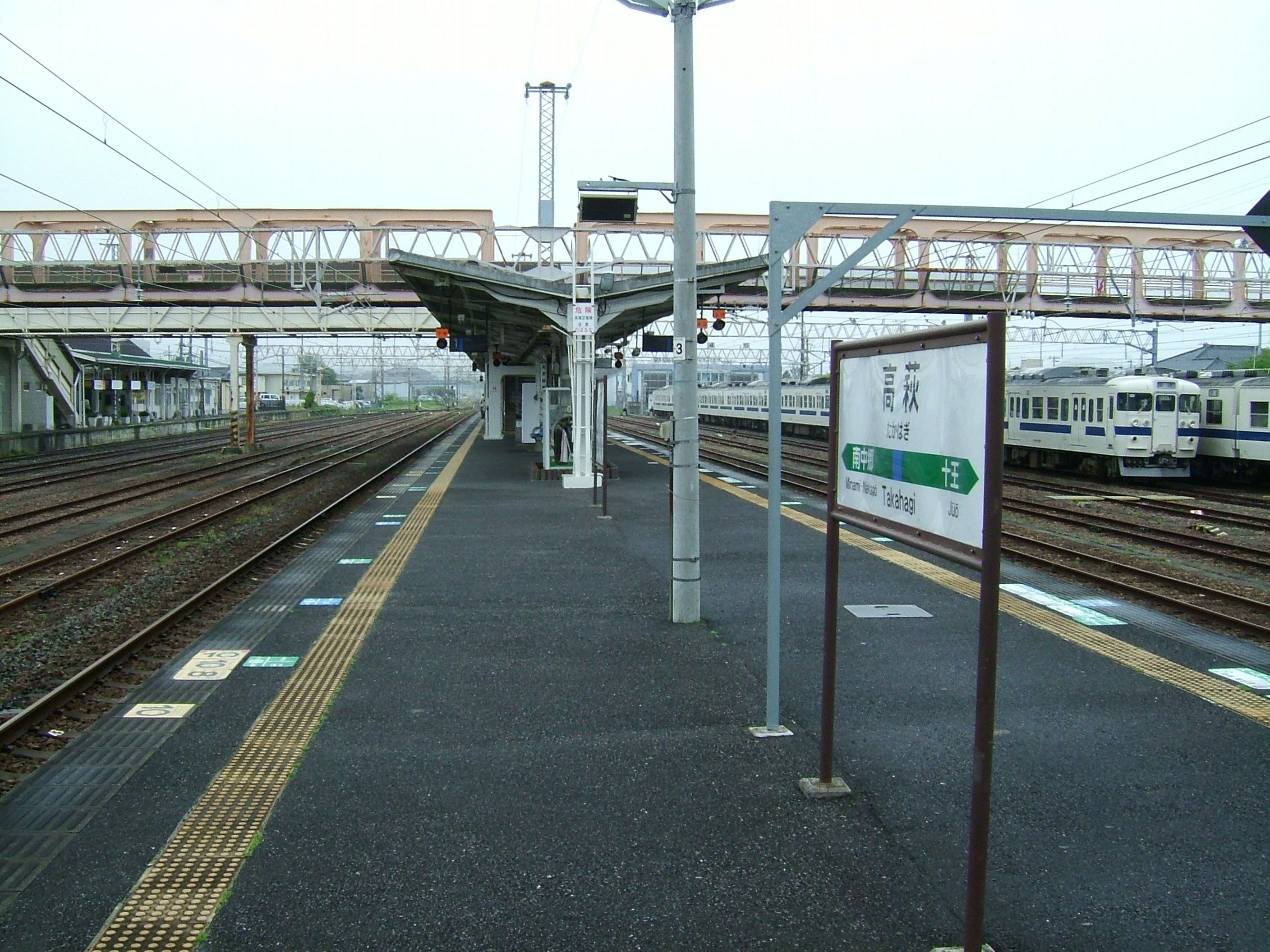
The platform looking north

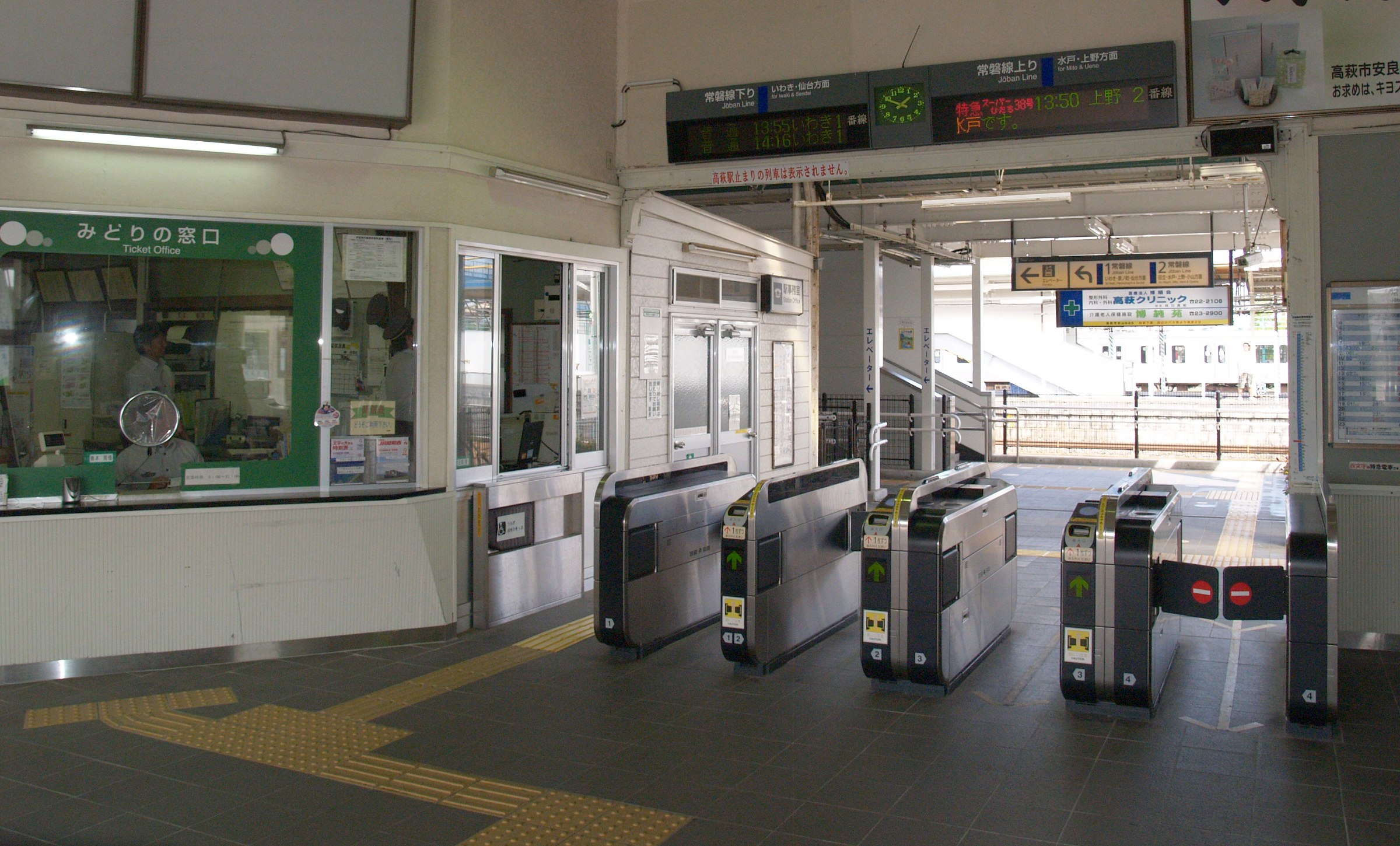
The ticket barriers

== Surrounding area ==
- Takahagi Post Office
- National Route 6
- Ibaraki Prefectural Takahagi High School
- Ibaraki Prefectural Takahagi Kiyomatsu High School
- Takahagi City Library

== See also ==
- List of railway stations in Japan
