= Kasama Station =

Railway station in Kasama, Ibaraki Prefecture, Japan

Kasama Station 笠間駅
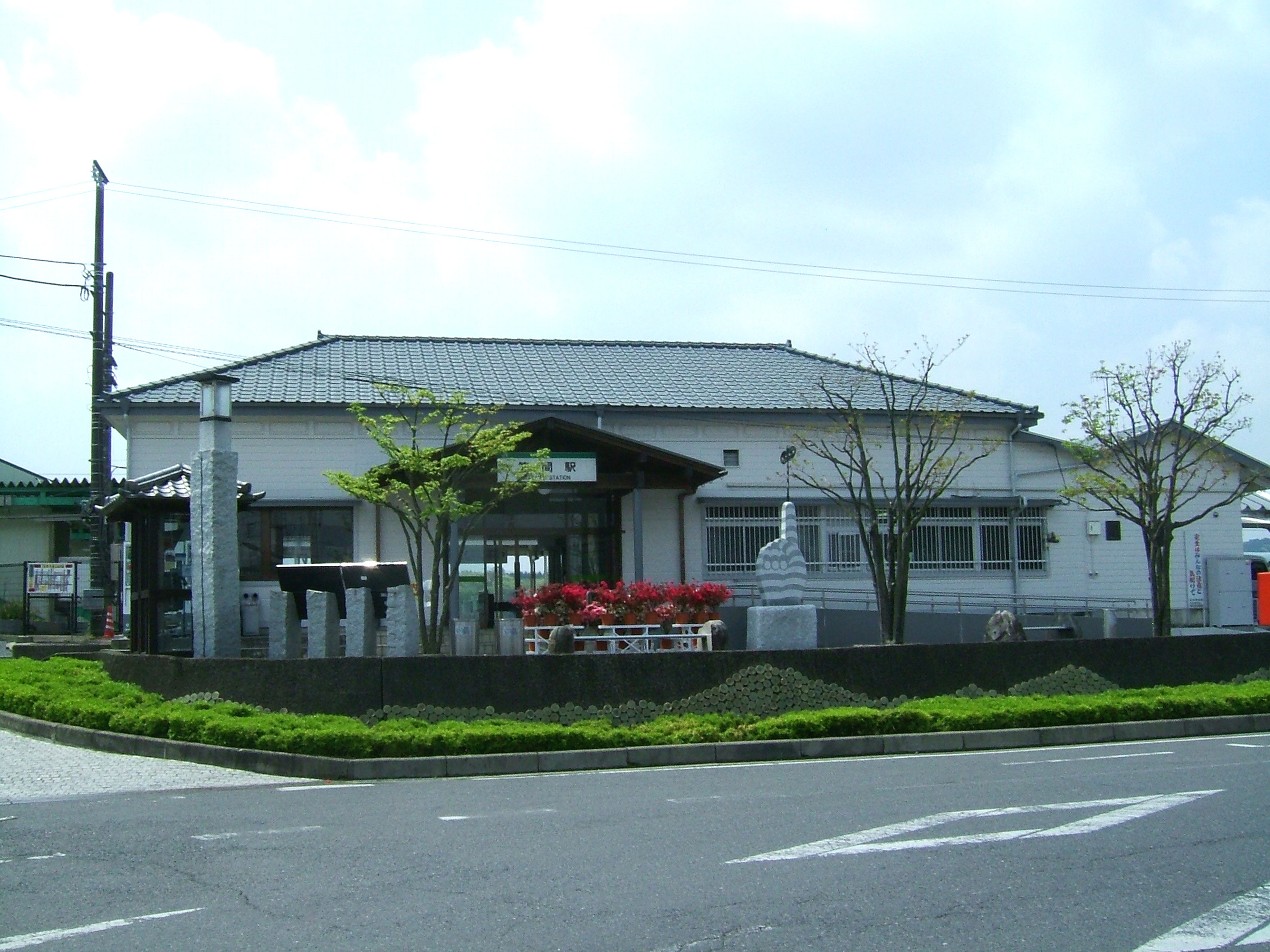
- Kasama Station, April 2008

General information
- Location: Shimoichige, Kasama-shi, Ibaraki-ken 309-1626; Japan
- Coordinates: 36.3731°N 140.2463°E
- Operator: JR East
- Line: ■ Mito Line
- Distance: 43.3 km from Oyama
- Platforms: 1 side + 1 island platform

Other information
- Status: Staffed
- Website: Official website

History
- Opened: 16 January 1889

Passengers
- FY2019: 1292 daily

Services
Preceding station	JR East	Following station
Inada towards Oyama	Mito Line	Shishido towards Mito
Location
- Location within Ibaraki Prefecture Location within Japan

Kasama Station (笠間駅, Kasama-eki) is a passenger railway station located in the city of Kasama, Ibaraki Prefecture, Japan operated by the East Japan Railway Company (JR East).

== Lines ==
Kasama Station is served by the Mito Line, and is located 43.3 km from the official starting point of the line at Oyama Station.

== Station layout ==
The station consists of one side platform and one island platform, connected to the station building by a footbridge. The station is staffed.

=== Platforms ===
1	■ Mito Line	for Tomobe and Mito
2, 3	■ Mito Line	for Shimodate and Oyama

== History ==
Kasama Station was opened on 16 January 1889. The station was absorbed into the JR East network upon the privatization of the Japanese National Railways (JNR) on 1 April 1987.

== Passenger statistics ==
In fiscal 2019, the station was used by an average of 1292 passengers daily (boarding passengers only).

== Surrounding area ==
- National Route 355
- former Kasama City Hall
- Kasama Post Office
- Kasama Inari Shrine

== See also ==
- List of railway stations in Japan
