= Ueda Station =

Ueda Station is the name of multiple train stations in Japan:

- Ueda Station (Nagoya) – (植田駅) in Nagoya, Aichi Prefecture
- Ueda Station (Fukushima) – (植田駅) in Fukushima Prefecture
- Ueda Station (Nagano) – (上田駅) in Nagano Prefecture

== See also ==
- Ueta Station – (植田駅) in Aichi Prefecture
