= Tozawa Masazane =

Viscount Tozawa Masazane
- 戸沢正実
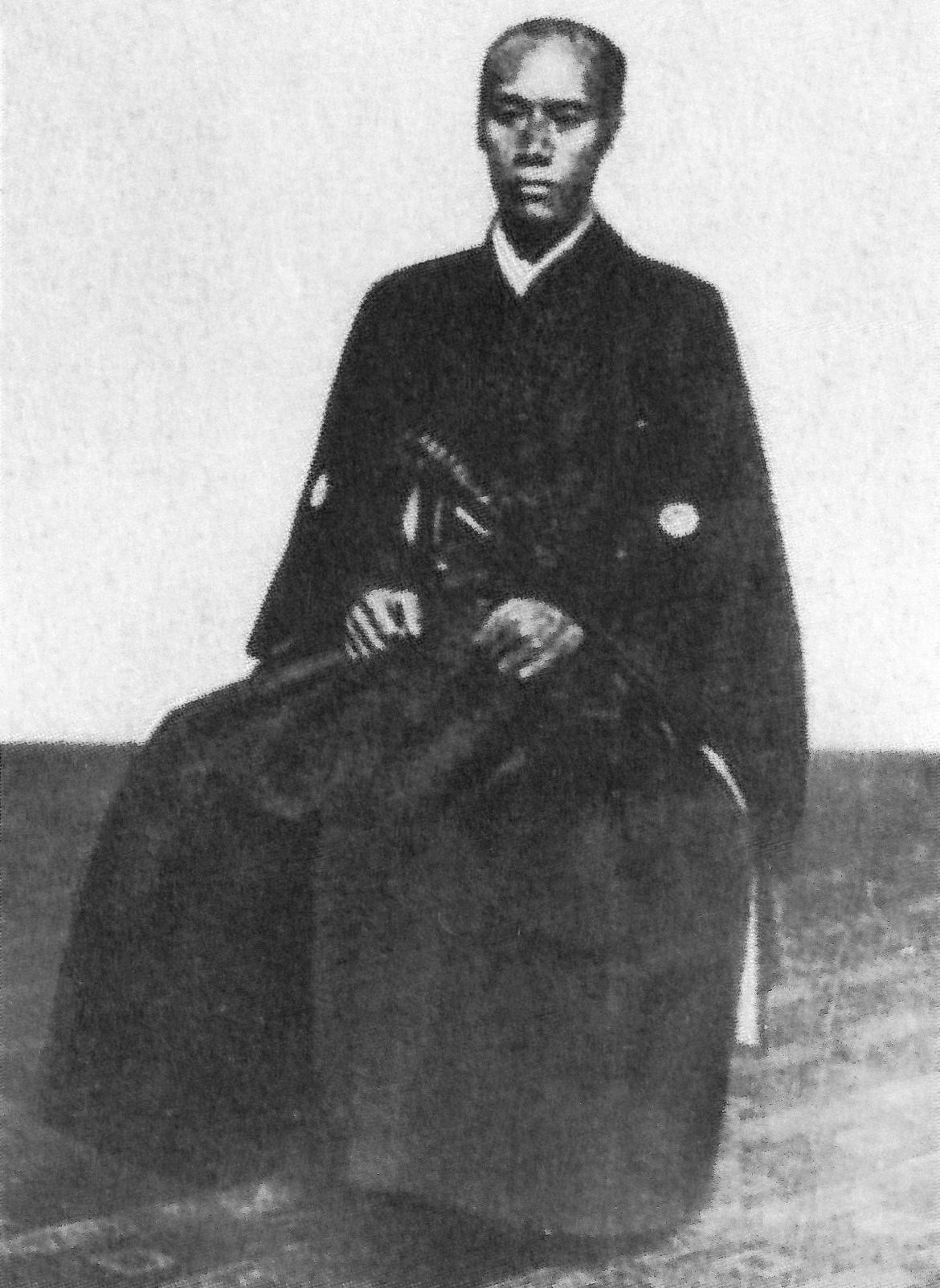
- Tozawa Masazane
- Monarchs: Shōgun: Tokugawa Ieyoshi; Tokugawa Iesada; Tokugawa Ieshige; Tokugawa Yoshinobu

11th Daimyō of Shinjō Domain
- In office 1843–1869
- Preceded by: Tozawa Masayoshi
- Succeeded by: -none-

Imperial Governor of Shinjō
- In office 1869–1871
- Monarch: Emperor Meiji

Personal details
- Born: September 9, 1825
- Died: August 23, 1884 (aged 58); Tokyo, Japan
- Spouses: (1) daughter of Ogasawara Tadaakira of Kokura Domain; (2) daughter of Aoyama Tadanaga of Sasayama Domain; (3) daughter of Matsudaira Tadakata of Ueda Domain; (4) daughter of Matsudaira Nobuyori of Yoshida Domain; (5) daughter of Sakai Tadaaki of Tsuruoka Domain
- Parent: Tozawa Masayoshi (father)

Tozawa Masazane (戸沢正実, January 7, 1833 – August 16, 1896) was the 11th (and final) daimyō of Shinjō Domain in Dewa Province, Japan (modern-day Yamagata Prefecture), under the Edo period Tokugawa shogunate of Japan. He received the courtesy title of Kazusa-no-suke which was later rated to Nakatsukasa-daiyū and Court rank of Junior Fourth Rank, Lower Grade.

== Biography ==
Tozawa Masazane was the eldest son of Tozawa Masayoshi and became daimyō on his father's death in 1843. As he was still in his minority, his retired grandfather Tozawa Masatsugu initially ruled as regent in his stead. In 1846, assisted by the domain's karō Yoshitaka Kageyu, he initiated a number of political and economic reforms.

During the Boshin War of the Meiji Restoration, Shinjō Domain was initially in favor of the Satchō Alliance, but later became a member of the Ōuetsu Reppan Dōmei. However, after Kubota Domain switched sides to favor the Meiji government, Shinjō Domain soon followed. Neighboring Shōnai Domain, outraged by the betrayal, sent its army to invade Shinjō Domain, and after a fierce battle, destroyed Shinjō Castle and much of the surrounding castle town. Masazane escaped to Kubota Castle, where he remained in exile for 70 days until his domain was liberated by forces loyal to the new Meiji government.

On June 2, 1869, the new government awarded Shinjō Domain with an increase in revenues of 15,000 koku. However, later the same month, the government issued a decree abolishing the domain system and Masazane was appointed imperial governor of Shinjō. The former domain was absorbed into Yamagata Prefecture in July 1871 he relocated to Tokyo. In 1884, he became a viscount (shishaku) under the new kazoku peerage system. He died in 1896.

== See also ==
- Tozawa clan
