= Tozawa clan =

Tozawa 戸沢
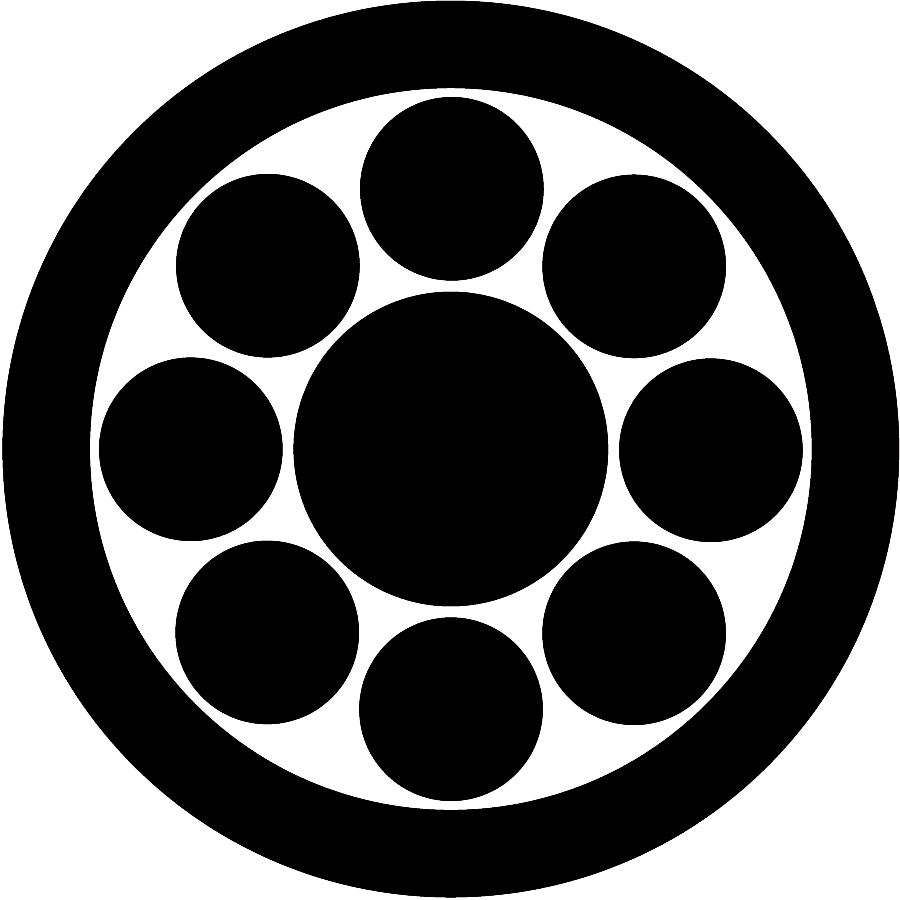
- Tozawa family crest
- Home province: Mutsu Province (?)
- Parent house: Taira clan (?)
- Titles: Kōzuke-no-suke
- Final ruler: Tozawa Masazane
- Founding year: c. Heian period
- Ruled until: 1873 (Abolition of the han system)

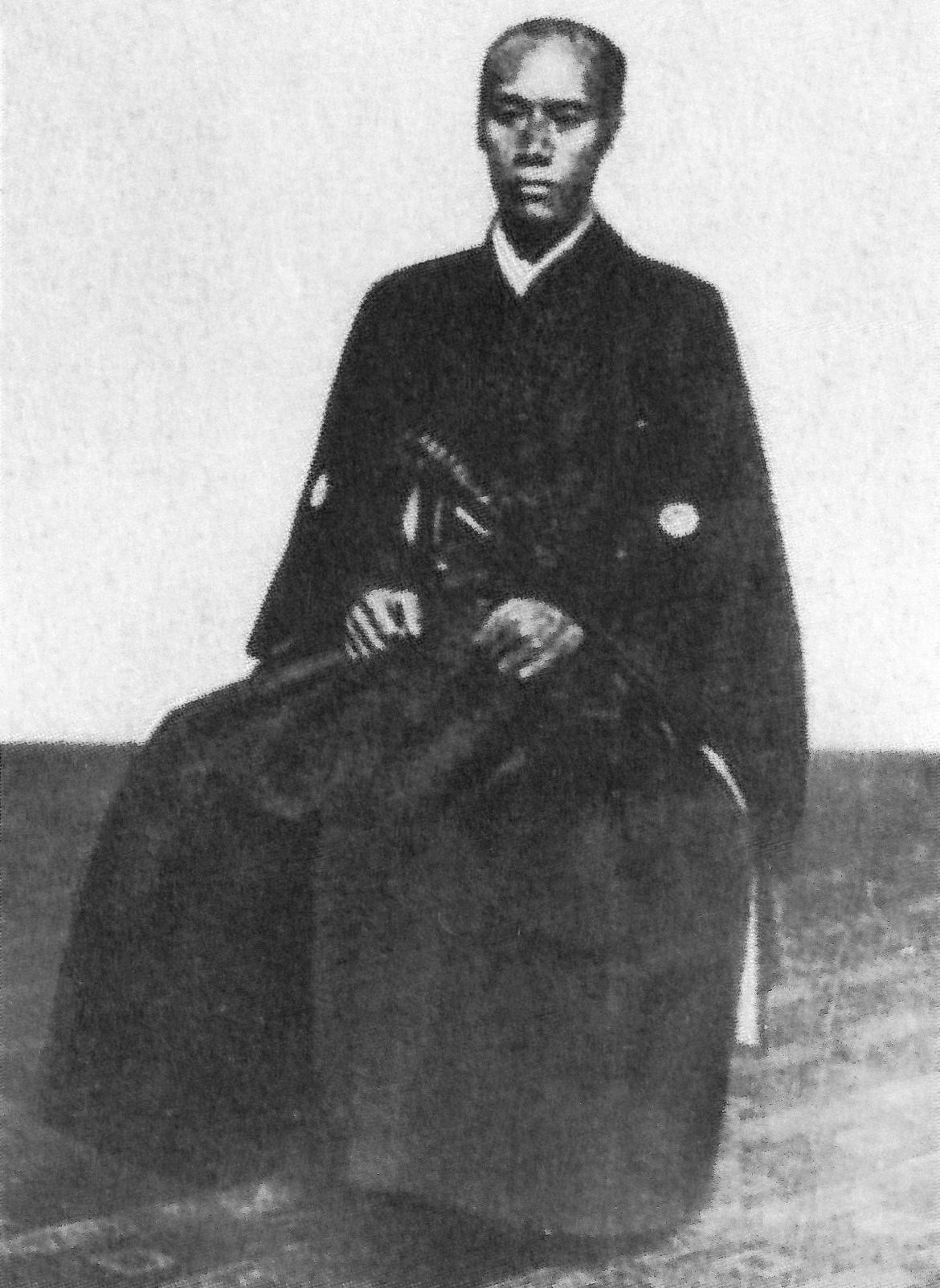
Tozawa Masazane, final daimyō of Shinjō

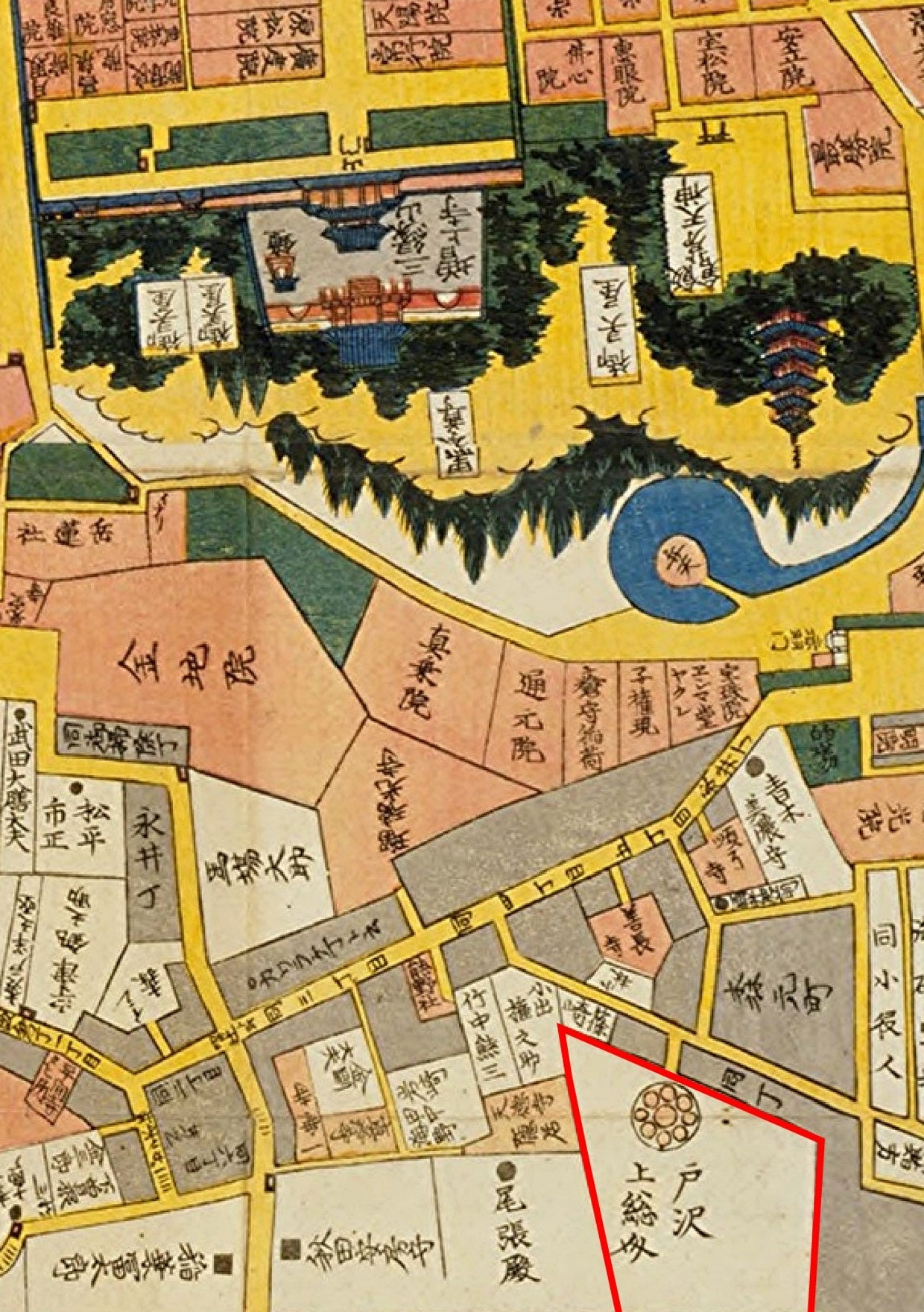
Tozawa kamiyashiki

Tozawa clan (戸沢氏, Tozawa-shi) was a Japanese samurai kin group from Mutsu and Dewa Provinces who ruled as daimyō of Shinjō Domain under the Edo period Tokugawa shogunate. The Tozawa clan residence in Edo was located near the temple of Zōjō-ji.

== History ==
The Tozawa clan claimed descent from Taira no Tadamasa (d.1156), of the Kammu Heike lineage who had estates near Mount Miwa in Yamato Province. He opposed Kiso Yoshinaka and fled to his shōen in what is now part of Shizukuishi, Iwate. He later pledged fealty to Minamoto no Yoritomo and fought at the Battle of Yashima and the campaign against the Northern Fujiwara, for which he was awarded an estate in Mutsu Province from which he adopted the family name of "Tozawa". The clan was forced across the Ōu Mountains into Dewa Province due to attacks by the Nanbu clan and occupied estates in what is now Semboku, Akita from the 13th century. However, there is little historical documentation to back these claims of Taira ancestry, and in all probability the clan was descended a local gōzoku clan, possibly of Emishi descent in the service of the Northern Fujiwara, who adopted a story of a Taira lineage for the sake of prestige.

The Tozawa supported the Southern Court during the Nanboku-cho period and maintained control of their estates around what is now Kakunodate, Akita through the Muromachi period and into the Sengoku period. faced with powerful and aggressive neighbors, the Tozawa clan was quick to pledge support to Toyotomi Hideyoshi and was confirmed in their holdings of 45,000 koku. After Hideoyoshi's death, Tozawa Masamori married a daughter of Torii Tadamasa and quickly attempted to forge a close relationship with Tokugawa Ieyasu. At the time of the Battle of Sekigahara, he was assigned with the Mogami clan to attack the forces of the Uesugi clan; however, realizing that the destruction of the Uesugi would open the door to invasion of his lands by his hereditary enemies, the Akita clan, his actions were only lukewarm. After the battle and Ieyasu punished him by seizing his domain and transferring him to Hitachi Province on a portion of the lands which had been recently seized from the Satake clan. However, he was allowed to maintain the status of daimyō of Matsuoka Domain and his kokudaka was set at 40,000 koku. During the Winter Campaign of the Siege of Osaka in 1614, he was assigned to guard Odawara Castle and during the Summer Campaign was ordered to guard Edo Castle. Through the efforts of his father-in-law, the clan was numbered as one of the fudai daimyō instead of the tozama daimyō. In 1622, the Mogami clan was destroyed by the shogunate, and the Tozawa clan was allowed to relocate to a portion of the former Mogami lands, near their ancestral homeland in Dewa Province. This marked the start of Shinjō Domain, a 60,000 koku holding, which they ruled to the Meiji restoration.

During the Boshin War, Shinjō Domain was initially in favor of the Satchō Alliance, but later became a member of the Ōuetsu Reppan Dōmei. However, after Kubota Domain switched sides to favor the Meiji government, Shinjō Domain soon followed. Neighboring Shōnai Domain, outraged by the betrayal, sent its army which destroyed Shinjō Castle and much of the surrounding castle town. The 11th daimyō, Tozawa Masazane was later awarded an increase in revenues to 83,000 koku shortly before the abolition of the han system. under the Meiji government, he became a viscount (shishaku) in the kazoku peerage. His son, Viscount Tozawa Masaoto (1888-1960) served in the House of Peers and post-World War II, was mayor of the city of Shinjō.
