= Matsuoka Domain =

Japanese feudal domain in the Tokugawa shogunate

Matsuoka Domain 松岡藩 Matsuoka-han
- Han of Japan
- 1602–1871
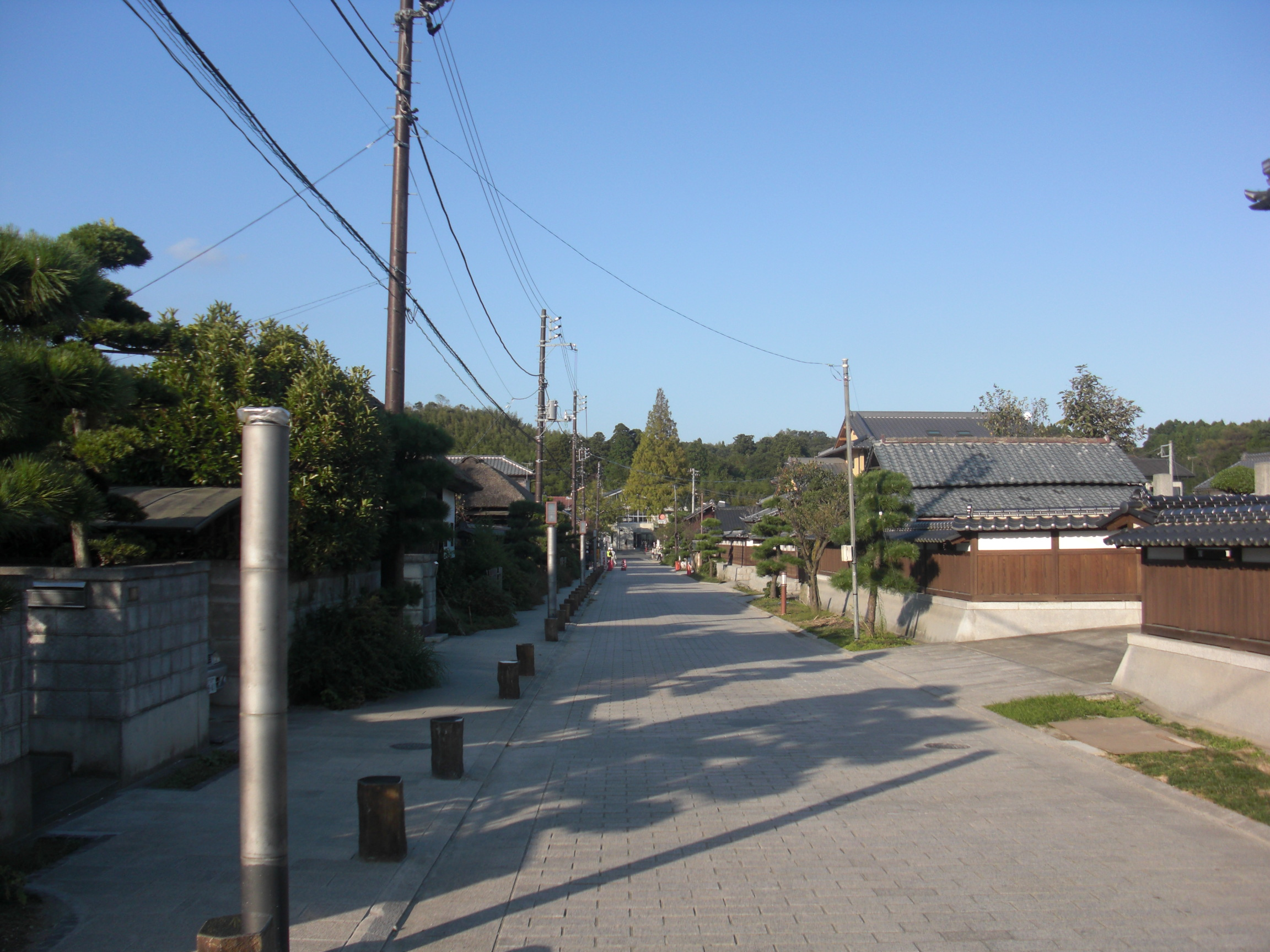
- Oyashiki St of the former Matsuoka Jōkamachi

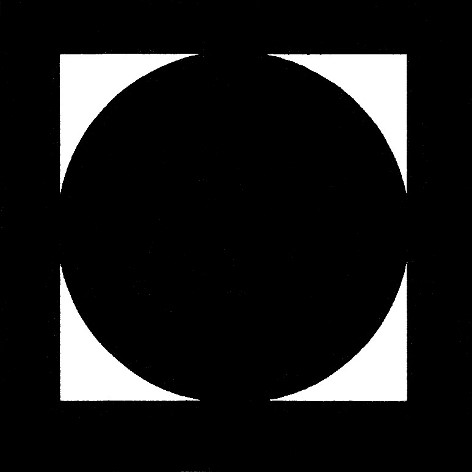
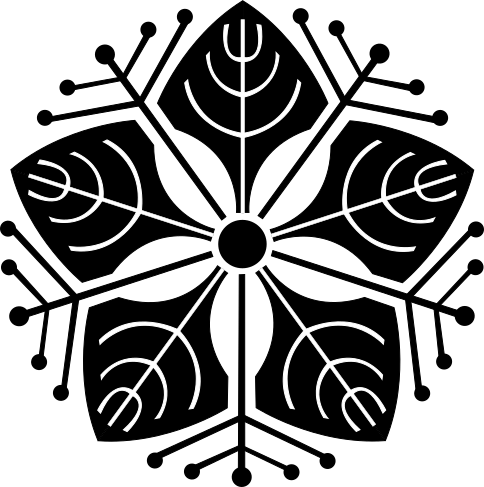
- Domain Flag Nakayama Mon
- Capital: Matsuoka Castle
- Area
  - Coordinates: 36°44′25″N 140°42′23″E
- Government
- Daimyō
  - 1602-1622: Tozawa Masamori (first)
  - 1861–1871: Nakayama Nobuaki (last)
- Historical era: Edo period
  - Establishment of the Tokugawa shogunate: 1602
  - Abolition of the han system: 1871
- Contained within
  - Province: Hitachi Province
- Today part of: Ibaraki Prefecture

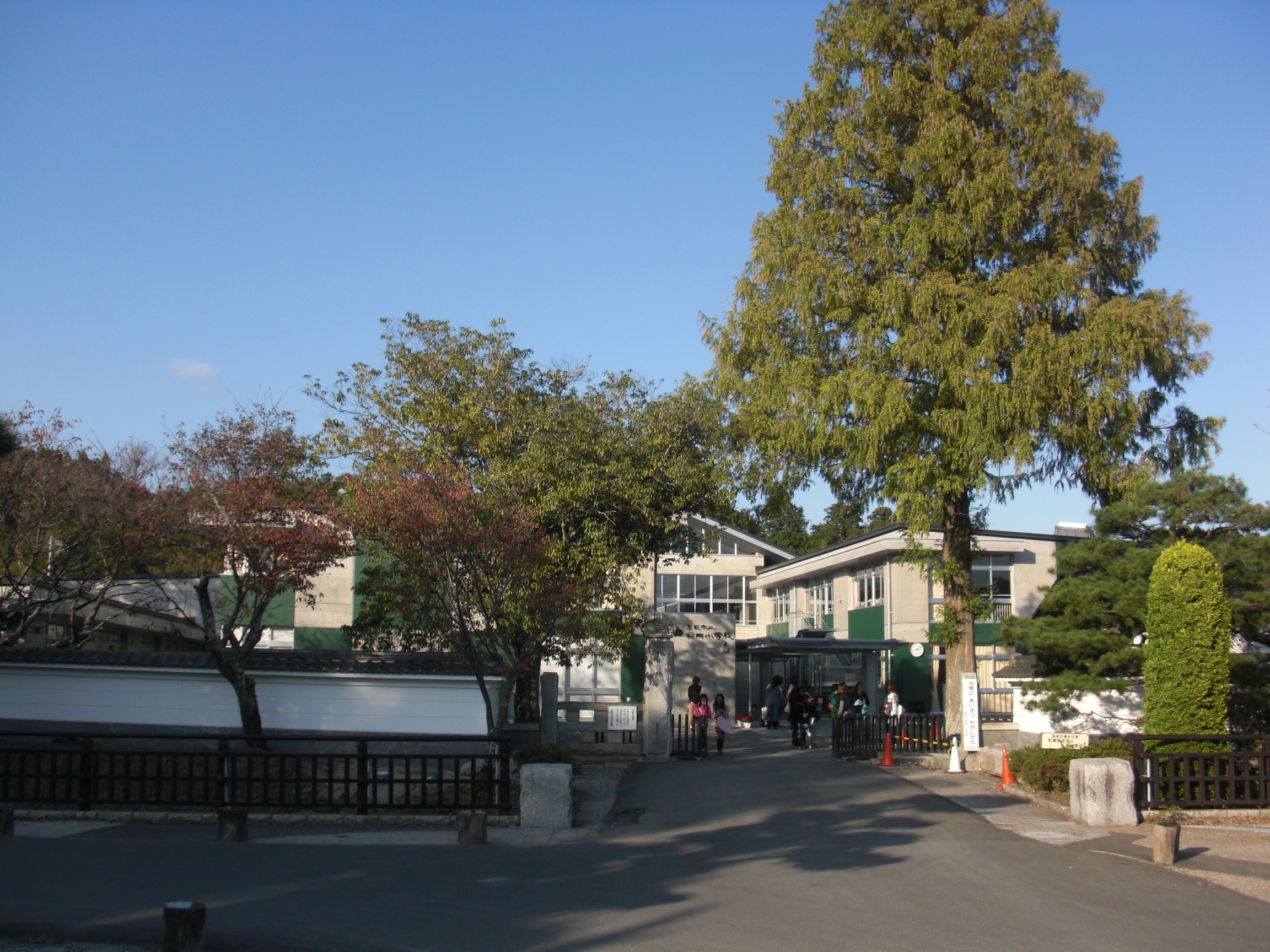
Matsuoka Elementary School is built on the site of Matsuoka Castle, administrative headquarters of Hitachi-Matsuoka Domain.

Matsuoka Domain (松岡藩, Matsuoka-han), also known as Hitachi-Matsuoka Domain (常陸松岡藩, Hitachi-Matsuoka-han) was a feudal domain under the Tokugawa shogunate of Edo period Japan, located in Hitachi Province (modern-day Ibaraki Prefecture), Japan. It was centered on Matsuoka Castle in what is now the city of Takahagi, Ibaraki. With the exception of its first twenty years, was ruled by the Nakayama clan.

== History ==
Following the Battle of Sekigahara, in 1600, Tokugawa Ieyasu shifted the Satake clan from its ancestral territories in Hitachi Province to Dewa Province in northern Japan. In 1602, he awarded a portion of the former Satake lands to Tozawa Masamori, marking the start of Matsuoka Domain. He served in a number of important posts within the administration of the Tokugawa shogunate, and was subsequently transferred to Shinjō Domain in Dewa Province in 1622. Matsuoka Domain was divided, with 30,000 koku going to Mito Domain and 10,000 koku to Tanagura Domain.

Nakayama Nobuyoshi, a young samurai whose father's sacrifice at Odawara was recognized by Ieyasu, was taken in by Ieyasu as a page in 1590. Following Sekigahara, he would be rewarded for his service by being named karō to Yorifusa in 1607, and following his own bravery serving Yorifusa at Osaka, he and his descendants subsequently named daimyō of the Matsuoka Domain at 20,000 koku as a subordinate domain of Mito following Tozawa's reassignment in 1622.

The 6th daimyō of Matsuoka, Nakayama Nobutoshi, moved his residence to Ōta, and the domain was then referred to as Hitachiōta Domain (常陸太田藩, Hitachiōta-han). His descendants continued to reside at Ōta until the time of the 10th daimyō, Nakayama Nobutaka, who returned the seat of the clan back to Matsuoka.

During the Boshin War, the 14th daimyō, Nakayama Nobuaki, sided with the pro-Imperial forces, participating in the Mito Rebellion, and after the Meiji restoration, Matsuoka Domain was finally recognized as independent of Mito Domain in 1868. The following year, the position of daimyō was abolished, and Nakayama Nobuaki became domain governor until retiring from public life with the abolition of the han system in 1871. His son Nobuzane would be created the first Baron Nakayama during the conversion of the old feudal titles to kazoku peerage in 1884.

The domain had a total population of 12,805 people in 2842 households per a census in 1869.

== Holdings at the end of the Edo period ==
Unlike most domains in the han system, Matsuoka Domain consisted of a single territory calculated to provide the assigned kokudaka, based on periodic cadastral surveys and projected agricultural yields.

- Hitachi Province
  - 29 villages in Taga District

== List of daimyō ==
#	Name	Tenure	Courtesy title	Court Rank	kokudaka
Tozawa clan (tozama) 1602–1622
1	Tozawa Masamori (戸沢政盛)	1602–1622	Ukyo-no-suke (右京亮)	Junior 5th Rank, Lower Grade (従五位下)	40,000 koku
Nakayama clan (tozama) 1622–1871
1	Nakayama Nobuyoshi (中山信吉)(ja)	1622–1642	Bizen-no-kami (備前守)	Junior 5th Rank, Lower Grade (従五位下)	25,000 koku
2	Nakayama Nobumasa (中山信政)	1642–1651	Higashi-ichi-no-kami (東市正)	Junior 5th Rank, Lower Grade (従五位下)	25,000 koku
3	Nakayama Nobuharu (中山信治)	1651–1681	Bizen-no-kami (備前守)	Junior 5th Rank, Lower Grade (従五位下))	25,000 koku
4	Nakayama Nobuyuki (中山信行)	1681–1682	Ichi-no-kami (市正)	Junior 5th Rank, Lower Grade (従五位下)	25,000 koku
5	Nakayama Nobunari (中山信成)	1683–1703	Bizen-no-kami (備前守)	Junior 5th Rank, Lower Grade (従五位下)	25,000 koku
6	Nakayama Nobutoshi (中山信敏)	1703–1711	Bizen-no-kami (備前守)	Junior 5th Rank, Lower Grade (従五位下)	25,000 koku
7	Nakayama Nobuyori (中山信順)	1711–1712	Ichi-no-kami (市正)	Junior 5th Rank, Lower Grade (従五位下)	25,000 koku
8	Nakayama Nobumasa (中山信昌)	1712–1743	Bizen-no-kami (備前守)	Junior 5th Rank, Lower Grade (従五位下)	25,000 koku
9	Nakayama Masanobu (中山政信)	1743–1771	Bizen-no-kami (備前守)	Junior 5th Rank, Lower Grade (従五位下)	25,000 koku
10	Nakayama Nobutaka (中山信敬)	1771–1819	Bitchu-no-kami (備中守)	Junior 5th Rank, Lower Grade (従五位下)	25,000 koku
11	Nakayama Nobumoto (中山信情)	1819–1828	Bitchu-no-kami (備中守)	Junior 5th Rank, Lower Grade (従五位下)	25,000 koku
12	Nakayama Nobumori (中山信守)	1828–1857	Bingo-no-kami (備後守)	Junior 5th Rank, Lower Grade (従五位下)	25,000 koku
13	Nakayama Nobutomi (中山信宝)	1857–1861	Bizen-no-kami (備前守)	Junior 5th Rank, Lower Grade (従五位下)	25,000 koku
14	Nakayama Nobuaki (中山信徴)(ja)	1861–1871	Bitchu-no-kami (1861–1869); Governor of Matsuoka (1869–1871)	Junior 5th Rank, Lower Grade (従五位下)	25,000 koku
*	Nakayama Nobuzane (中山信実)	1871–1934	1st Baron (男爵)	Junior 3rd Rank (従三位)	
*	Nakayama Nobutsune (中山信常)	1935–1947	2nd Baron (男爵)	Nobility abolished per post-war Constitution	
