= Tozawa =

Tozawa (written: 戸澤 or 戸沢) is a Japanese surname. Notable people with the surname include:

- Akira Tozawa (戸澤 アキラ) (born 1985), Japanese professional wrestler
- Tomomi Tozawa (兎澤 朋美) (born 1999), Japanese para athlete
- Tozawa Masamori (戸沢 政盛) (1585–1648), Japanese samurai and daimyō

== See also ==
- Tozawa, Yamagata (戸沢村, Tozawa-mura), village in Mogami District, Yamagata, Japan
