= Izumi Station (Iwaki) =

Railway station in Iwaki, Fukushima Prefecture, Japan

Izumi Station 泉駅
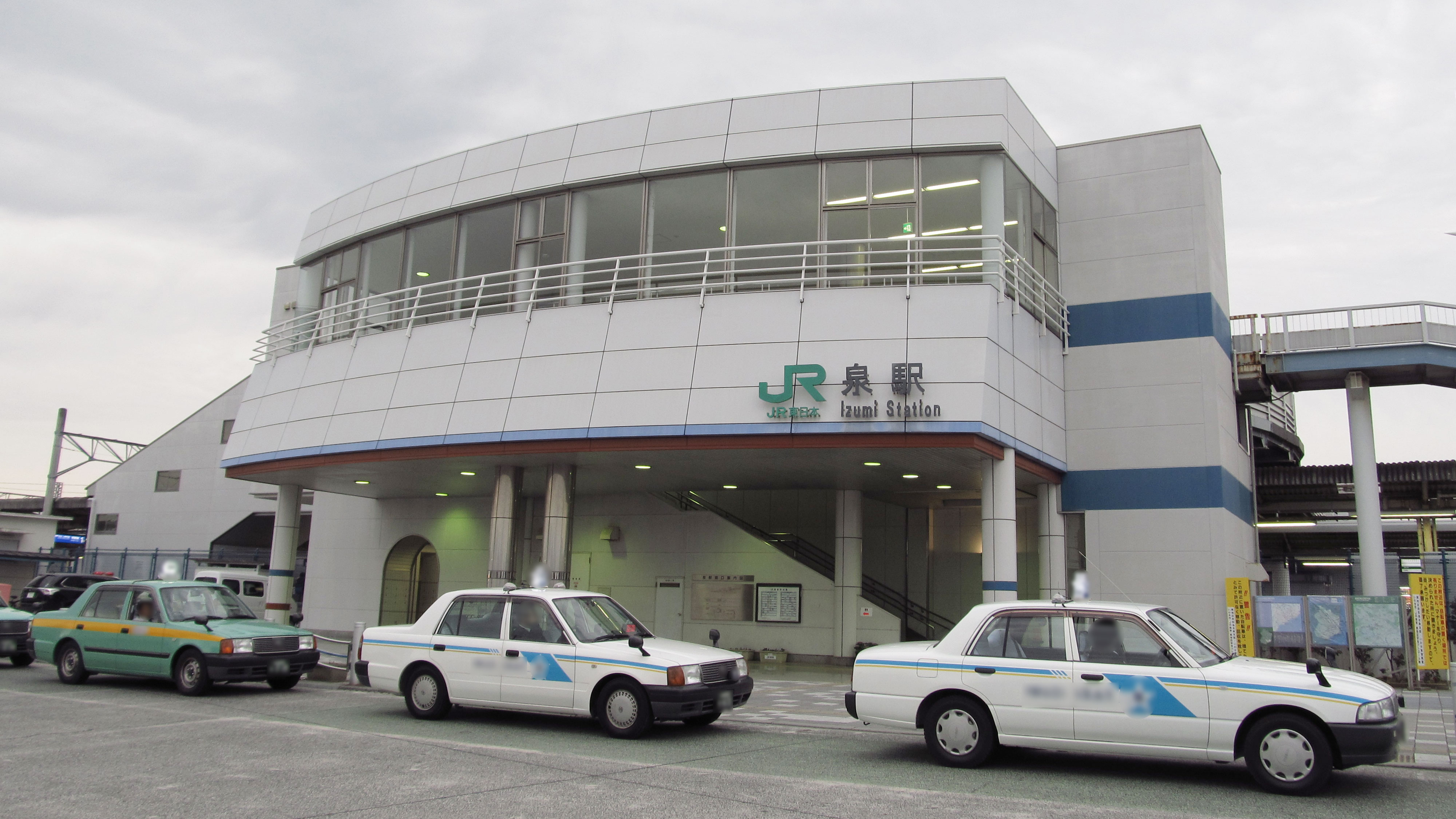
- Izumi Station in December 2013

General information
- Location: Izumi-machi, Iwaki-shi, Fukushima-ken 971-8185; Japan
- Coordinates: 36°57′20″N 140°51′15″E
- Operator: JR East
- Lines: ■ Joban Line; Fukushima Rinkai Railway Main Line (Freight Only)
- Distance: 195.0 km from Nippori
- Platforms: 1 side + 1 island platform
- Tracks: 3

Other information
- Status: Staffed (Midori no Madoguchi )
- Website: Official website

History
- Opened: 25 February 1897; 129 years ago

Passengers
- FY2018: 2449 daily

Services
Preceding station	JR East	Following station
Nakoso (limited service) towards Shinagawa	Hitachi	Yumoto towards Sendai
Ueda towards Shinagawa	Jōban Line Local-Futsuu	Yumoto towards Sendai
Location
- Location within Fukushima Prefecture Location within Japan

Izumi Station (泉駅, Izumi eki) is a railway station on the Jōban Line in the city of Iwaki, Fukushima, Japan, operated by East Japan Railway Company (JR East). The station also has a freight depot for the Fukushima Rinkai Railway Main Line.

== Lines ==
Izumi Station is served by the Jōban Line, and is located 195.0 km from the official starting point of the line at Nippori

== Station layout ==
Izumi Station has one island platform and one side platform connected to the station building by a footbridge. The station has a Midori no Madoguchi staffed ticket office.

=== Platforms ===
1	■ Joban Line	for Takahagi, Hitachi, Katsuta, Mito, Tomobe, Ishioka and Tsuchiura
1	■ Jōban Line (Limited Express)	for Takahagi, Mito, Tsuchiura, Ueno, Tokyo and Shinagawa
2,3	■ Jōban Line	for Iwaki, Hirono, Tomioka, Namie, Haranomachi, Soma and Sendai
2,3	■ Jōban Line (Limited Express)	for Iwaki and Sendai

== History ==
Izumi Station opened on 25 February 1897. The station was absorbed into the JR East network upon the privatization of the Japanese National Railways (JNR) on 1 April 1987.

== Passenger statistics ==
In fiscal 2018, the station was used by an average of 2449 passengers daily (boarding passengers only).

== Surrounding area ==
- Iwaki-Izumi Post Office
- Onahama Port
- Aquamarine Fukushima

== See also ==
- List of railway stations in Japan
