= Isohara Station =

Railway station in Kitaibaraki, Ibaraki Prefecture, Japan

Isohara Station 磯原駅
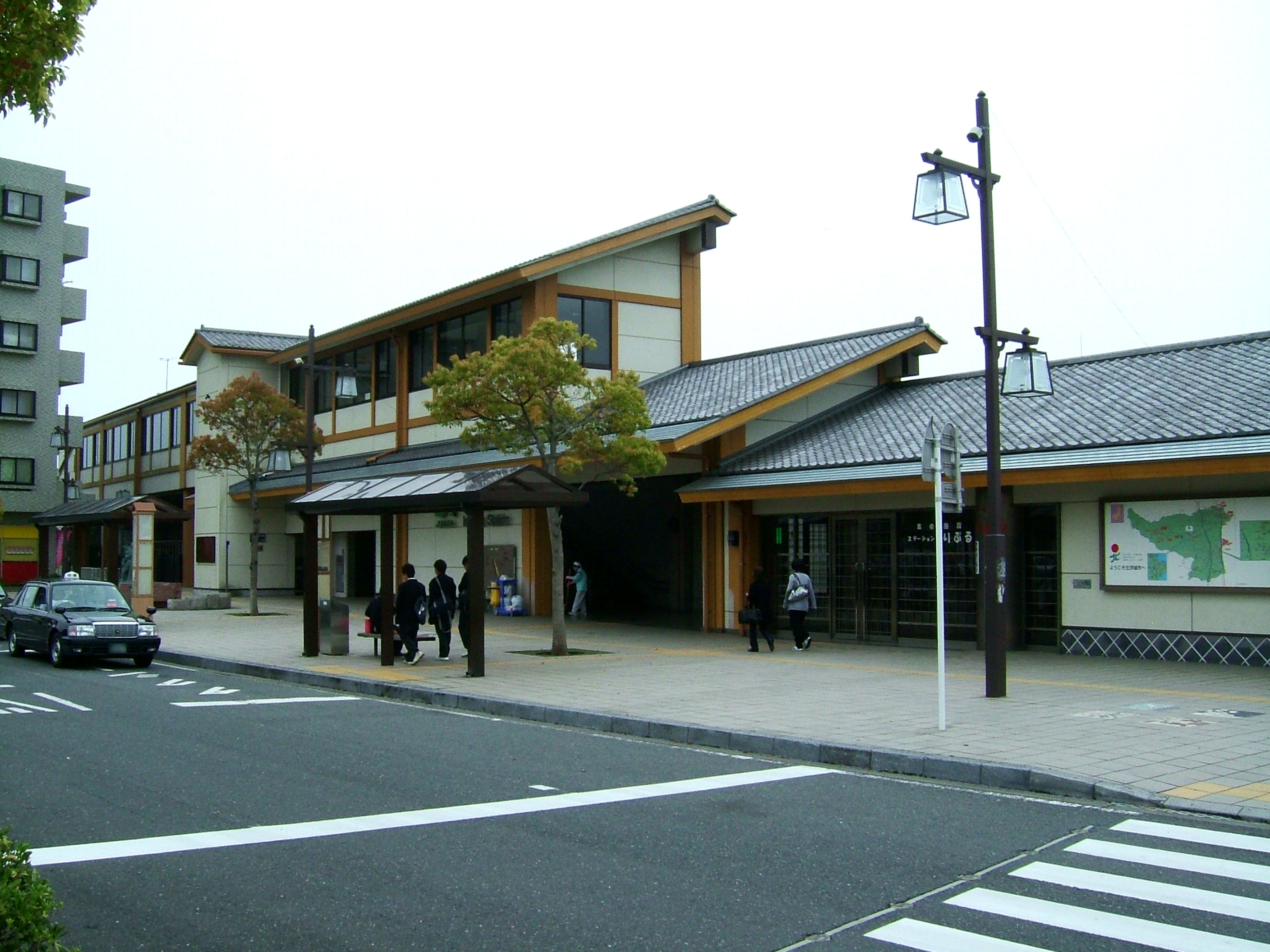
- Isohara Station in May 2008

General information
- Location: 759 Isohara, Isohara-cho, Kitaibaraki-shi, Ibaraki-ken 319-1541; Japan
- Coordinates: 36.7907°N 140.7458°E
- Operator: JR East
- Line: ■ Joban Line
- Distance: 171.6 km from Nippori
- Platforms: 2 side platforms

Other information
- Status: Staffed
- Website: Official website

History
- Opened: 25 February 1897; 129 years ago

Passengers
- FY2019: 1697 daily

Services
Preceding station	JR East	Following station
Takahagi (limited service) towards Shinagawa	Hitachi (limited service)	Nakoso (limited service) towards Sendai
Minami-Nakagō towards Shinagawa	Jōban Line Local-Futsuu	Ōtsukō towards Sendai
Location
- Location within Ibaraki Prefecture Location within Japan

Isohara Station (磯原駅, Isohara-eki) is a passenger railway station in the city of Kitaibaraki, Ibaraki Prefecture, Japan, operated by East Japan Railway Company (JR East).

== Lines ==
Isohara Station is served by the Joban Line, and is located 171.6 km from the official starting point of the line at Nippori Station.

== Station layout ==
The station consists of two elevated opposed side platforms. The station building is elevated to the level of the platforms; however, connection between the platforms is made an overhead walkway. The station is staffed. Nanatsu no Ko is used as the departure melody.

=== Platforms ===
1	■ Joban Line	for Takahagi, Hitachi, Katsuta, Mito, Tomobe, Ishioka and Tsuchiura
1	■ Jōban Line (Limited Express)	for Takahagi, Mito, Ueno, Tokyo and Shinagawa
2	■ Jōban Line	for Iwaki, Tomioka, Namie and Haranomachi
2	■ Jōban Line (Limited Express)	for Iwaki and Sendai

== History ==
Isohara Station was opened on 25 February 1897. The station was absorbed into the JR East network upon the privatization of Japanese National Railways (JNR) on 1 April 1987. It was rebuilt as an elevated station building in October 1997.

== Passenger statistics ==
In fiscal 2019, the station was used by an average of 1697 passengers daily (boarding passengers only).

== Surrounding area ==
- Kita-Ibaraki Post Office
- National Route 6
- Isohara Industrial Park

== See also ==
- List of railway stations in Japan
