= Shinjō Castle =

Coordinates: 38°46′1.27″N 140°17′36.61″E

Shinjō Castle 新庄城
- Shinjō, Yamagata Prefecture, Japan
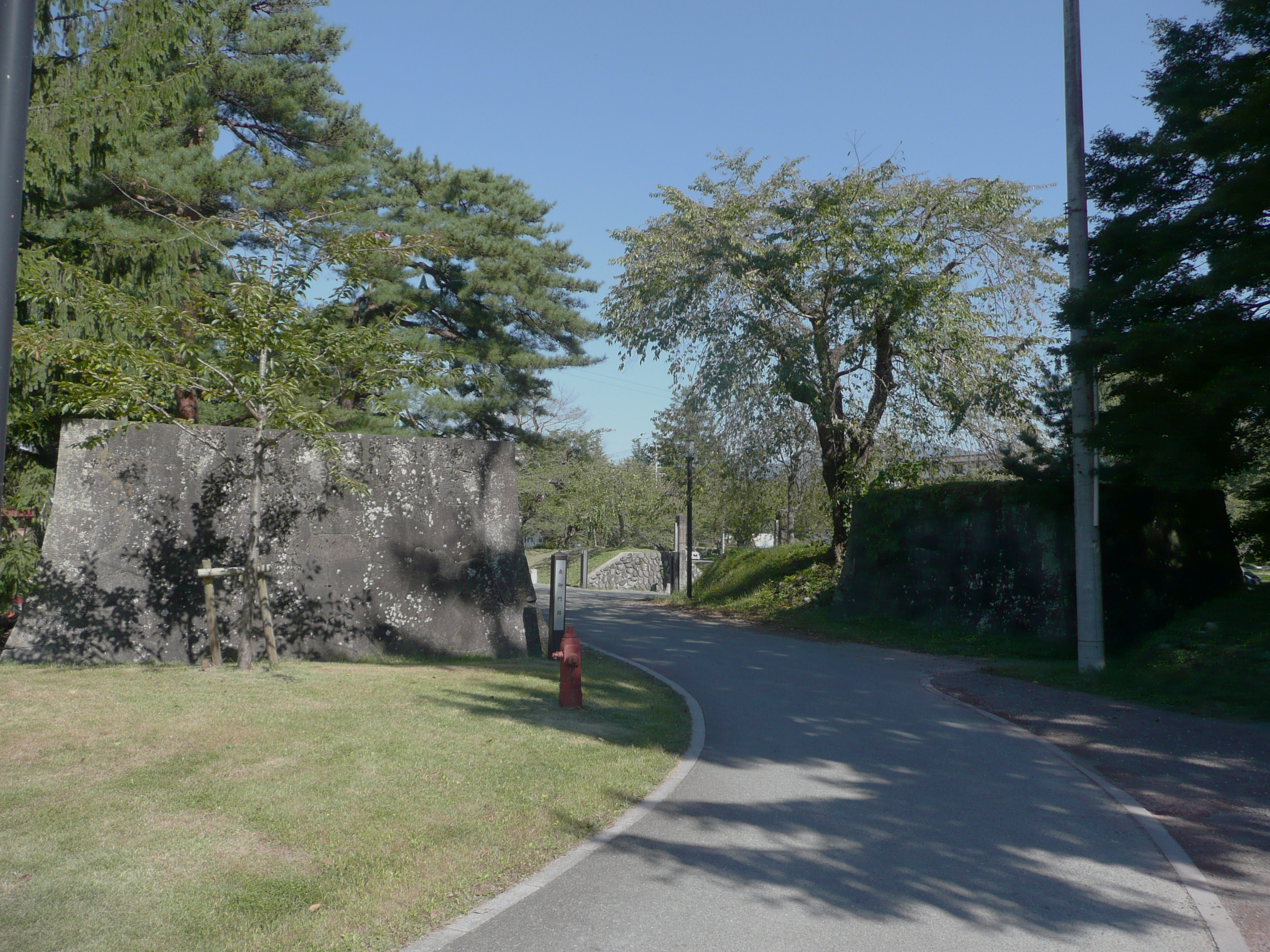
- Foundations of Shinjō Castle gate

Site information
- Type: flatland-style Japanese castle
- Open to the public: yes

Location

Site history
- Built: 1622
- Built by: Tozawa Masamori
- In use: Edo period
- Demolished: 1868

Shinjō Castle (新庄城, Shinjō-jō) is a Japanese castle located in Shinjō, northern Yamagata Prefecture, Japan. Throughout most of the Edo period, Shinjō Castle was home to the Tozawa clan, daimyō of Shinjō Domain. The castle was also known as "Numata-jō" (沼田城) or "Unuma-jō" (鵜沼城).

== History ==
Tozawa Masamori, the daimyō of Hitachi-Matsuoka Domain (40,000 koku) was transferred to Dewa Province in September 1622 following the suppression of the Mogami clan by the Tokugawa shogunate and gained an increase in revenues to 60,000 koku. His new territory extended over all of what is now Mogami District and a portion of Murayama District in what is now Yamagata Prefecture. Finding the ancient hill-top Sakenobe Castle to be too small and inconveniently located, he successfully petitioned the shogunate for permission to construct a new castle in the flatlands with a main bailey, secondary bailey to the south, all surrounded by a third bailey and wet moats.

In 1636, the donjon was destroyed in a fire, and was never rebuilt.

In 1868, during the Boshin War of the Meiji restoration, the castle was the site of the Battle of Shinjō. Following the defection of Kubota Domain from the Ōuetsu Reppan Dōmei, Shinjō Domain soon followed suit. Shinjō Domain was then invaded by the armies of neighboring Shōnai Domain, and in the subsequent battle, Shinjō Castle and much of its surrounding castle town was destroyed.

At present, the site of the main bailey is occupied by four Shinto shrines, with the Temman-gu shrine being the only structure of the original castle to survive (aside for some walls and foundations). The site of the donjon and the second bailey is a public park, and a history museum is located within the precincts of the former third bailey.

== Literature ==
- Schmorleitz, Morton S. (1974). Castles in Japan. Tokyo: Charles E. Tuttle Co. pp. 144–145. ISBN 0-8048-1102-4.
- Motoo, Hinago (1986). Japanese Castles. Tokyo: Kodansha. p. 200 pages. ISBN 0-87011-766-1.
- Mitchelhill, Jennifer (2004). Castles of the Samurai: Power and Beauty. Tokyo: Kodansha. p. 112 pages. ISBN 4-7700-2954-3.
- Turnbull, Stephen (2003). Japanese Castles 1540-1640. Osprey Publishing. p. 64 pages. ISBN 1-84176-429-9.
