= Kitaibaraki =

Kitaibaraki 北茨城市
- City
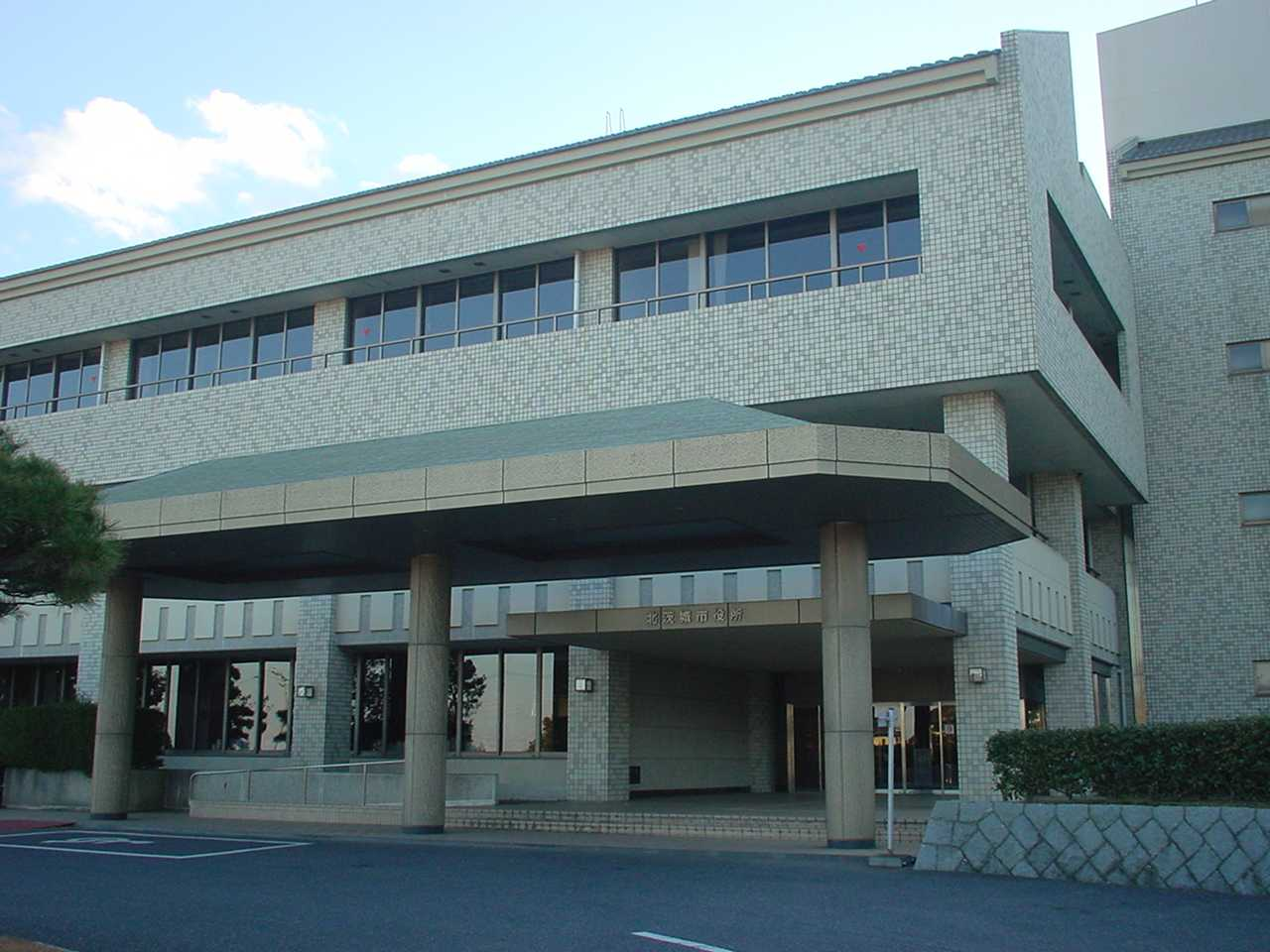
- Kitaibaraki City Hall

- Flag Seal

- Location of Kitaibaraki in Ibaraki Prefecture

- Coordinates: 36°48′6.8″N 140°45′3.7″E
- Country: Japan
- Region: Kantō
- Prefecture: Ibaraki
- Former Otsu and Hirakata towns settled: April 1, 1889
- City settled with six municipalities merged date: March 31, 1956

Government
  - Mayor: Michie Imai (今井路江) - from September 2026

Area
  - Total: 186.80 km^{2} (72.12 sq mi)

Population (July 2020)
  - Total: 41,750
  - Density: 223.5/km^{2} (578.9/sq mi)
- Time zone: UTC+9 (Japan Standard Time)
- Phone number: 0293-43-1111
- Address: Isohara 1630, Isohara-chō, Kitaibaraki-shi, Ibaraki-ken 319-1592
- Climate: Cfa
- Website: Official website
- Symbols
- Bird: Common gull
- Fish: Goosefish
- Flower: Rhododendron ponticum
- Tree: Pine

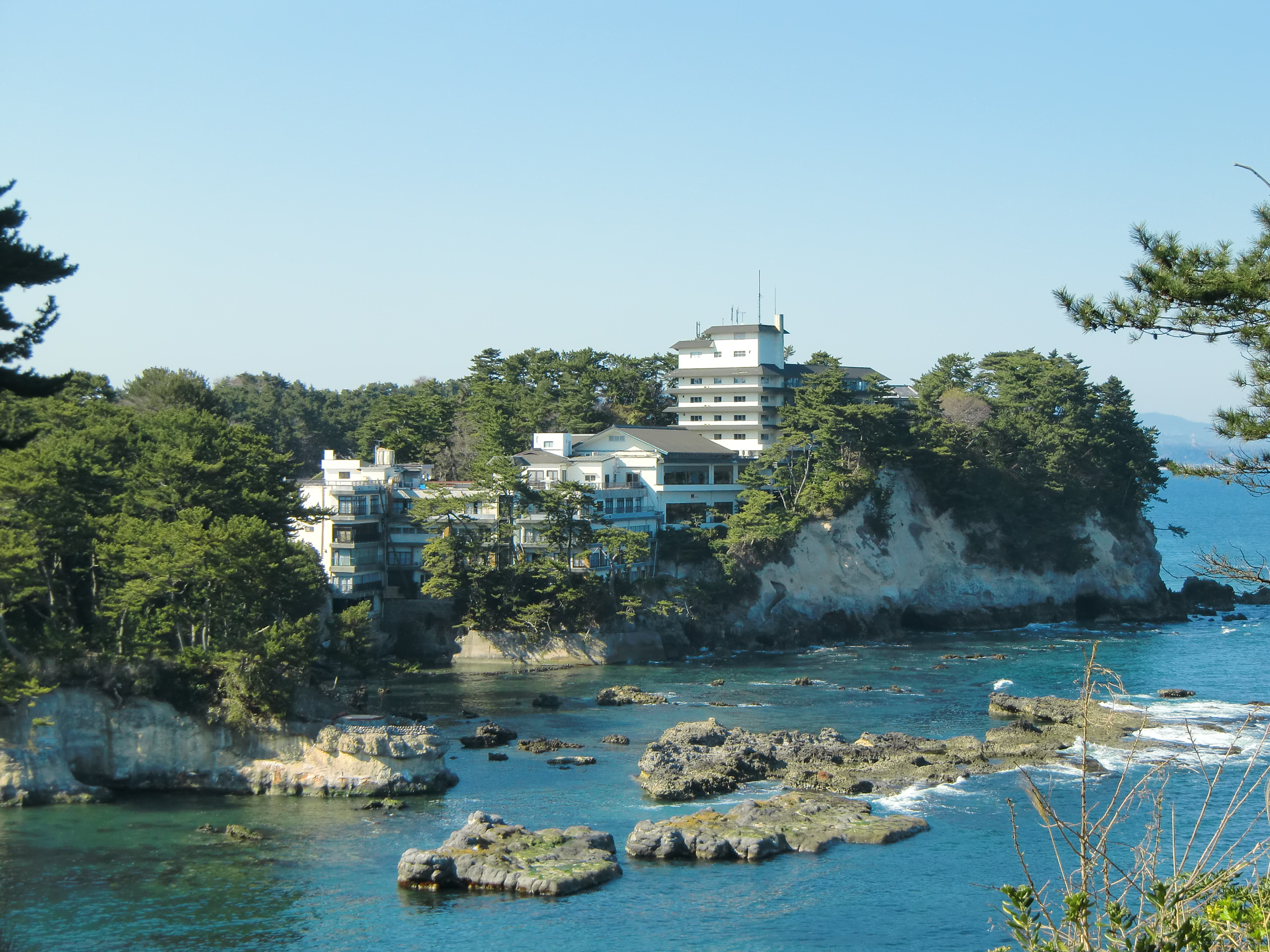
Izura coast of Kitaibaraki

Kitaibaraki (北茨城市, Kitaibaraki-shi) is a city in Ibaraki Prefecture, Japan. As of 1 July 2020, the city had an estimated population of 41,750 in 17,034 households and a population density of 220 persons per km^{2}. The percentage of the population aged over 65 was 34.6%. The total area of the city is 186.80 square kilometres (72.12 sq mi).

== Geography ==
Kitaibaraki is in northern Ibaraki Prefecture, bounded by Fukushima Prefecture to the north and the Pacific Ocean to the east. As its name implies, it is the northernmost city within Ibaraki. Approximately 80% of the total area is mountainous forest. The eastern region is low ground facing the ocean with spacious open flatland along the Okita and Satone Rivers. It is approximately 57 kilometers to the northeast of Mito, the prefectural capital.

=== Surrounding municipalities ===
Fukushima Prefecture

- Hanawa
- Iwaki
- Samegawa

Ibaraki Prefecture

- Takahagi

=== Climate ===
Kitaibaraki has a humid subtropical climate (Köppen Cfa) characterized by warm summers and cold winters with heavy snowfall. The average annual temperature in Kitaibaraki is 13.0 °C. The average annual rainfall is 1435 mm with September as the wettest month. The temperatures are highest on average in August, at around 24.2 °C, and lowest in January, at around 2.9 °C.

Climate data for Kitaibaraki (1991−2020 normals, extremes 1978−present)
Month	Jan	Feb	Mar	Apr	May	Jun	Jul	Aug	Sep	Oct	Nov	Dec	Year
Record high °C (°F)	20.2 (68.4)	22.8 (73.0)	24.8 (76.6)	25.7 (78.3)	30.3 (86.5)	31.3 (88.3)	33.9 (93.0)	35.7 (96.3)	34.0 (93.2)	32.1 (89.8)	24.4 (75.9)	24.3 (75.7)	35.7 (96.3)
Mean daily maximum °C (°F)	8.4 (47.1)	8.6 (47.5)	11.2 (52.2)	15.6 (60.1)	19.4 (66.9)	22.1 (71.8)	25.7 (78.3)	27.4 (81.3)	25.0 (77.0)	20.4 (68.7)	15.7 (60.3)	10.9 (51.6)	17.5 (63.6)
Daily mean °C (°F)	3.6 (38.5)	3.8 (38.8)	6.5 (43.7)	11.0 (51.8)	15.3 (59.5)	18.6 (65.5)	22.1 (71.8)	23.8 (74.8)	21.1 (70.0)	16.2 (61.2)	11.0 (51.8)	6.0 (42.8)	13.3 (55.9)
Mean daily minimum °C (°F)	−1.2 (29.8)	−1.0 (30.2)	1.7 (35.1)	6.3 (43.3)	11.3 (52.3)	15.5 (59.9)	19.4 (66.9)	20.9 (69.6)	17.9 (64.2)	12.3 (54.1)	6.2 (43.2)	1.2 (34.2)	9.2 (48.6)
Record low °C (°F)	−9.0 (15.8)	−9.3 (15.3)	−5.9 (21.4)	−3.7 (25.3)	2.5 (36.5)	6.1 (43.0)	12.3 (54.1)	12.0 (53.6)	9.1 (48.4)	1.7 (35.1)	−2.7 (27.1)	−7.7 (18.1)	−9.3 (15.3)
Average precipitation mm (inches)	50.0 (1.97)	45.9 (1.81)	99.9 (3.93)	128.5 (5.06)	156.1 (6.15)	158.0 (6.22)	170.4 (6.71)	138.1 (5.44)	183.2 (7.21)	189.5 (7.46)	78.7 (3.10)	48.8 (1.92)	1,435.4 (56.51)
Average precipitation days (≥ 1.0 mm)	4.7	5.1	8.8	10.1	11.3	12.0	13.3	9.6	11.6	10.5	7.1	5.3	109.4
Mean monthly sunshine hours	196.7	183.3	191.9	193.6	191.0	141.6	150.3	181.3	140.4	143.8	156.5	179.4	2,040.8
Source: Japan Meteorological Agency

== Demographics ==
Per Japanese census data, the population of Kitaibaraki has fluctuated somewhat over the past 70 years.

Historical population
Year	Pop.	±%
1920	38,559	—
1930	37,829	−1.9%
1940	37,718	−0.3%
1950	55,169	+46.3%
1960	60,567	+9.8%
1970	48,323	−20.2%
1980	47,670	−1.4%
1990	51,093	+7.2%
2000	51,593	+1.0%
2010	47,026	−8.9%
2020	41,801	−11.1%

== History ==
Under the ritsuryō system, the area of Kitaibaraki was the northern tip of the Tōkaidō region, and was part of Hitachi Province. The towns of Otsu and Hirakata and the village of Kitanakago were created with the establishment of the modern municipalities system on April 1, 1889. The area was part of the Jōban coal fields and coal mines were developed in the early twentieth century. Kitanakago became the town of Isohara on January 1, 1925. On March 31, 1956 the towns of Otsu, Hirakata, Isohara and the villages of Sekinan, Sekimonto and Minaminakago merged to form the city of Kitaibaraki. The city suffered from serious damage caused by the tsunami from the 2011 Tōhoku earthquake.

== Government ==
Kitaibaraki has a mayor-council form of government with a directly elected mayor and a unicameral city council of 19 members. Kitaibaraki, together with neighboring Takahagi, contributes two members to the Ibaraki Prefectural Assembly. In terms of national politics, the city is part of Ibaraki 5th district of the lower house of the Diet of Japan.

== Economy ==
Commerce developed during the Edo period along the Tanagura highway, which was also called the 'Road of Salt'. The area flourished with ports for water transportation and coal mining began at the end of the Edo period. Kitaibaraki is now a regional commercial center with some light manufacturing. JX Nippon Mining & Metals Corporation, Nichia Steel Works, NOK Corporation and Fuso Pharmaceutical Industries have major factories in the city. The Jōban Coal Field, which was the mainstay of the economy from the Meiji period to the mid-Shōwa period, closed in 1976. Commercial fishing from Otsu fishing port, notably for angler fish, is also a factor in the local economy.

== Education ==
Kitaibaraki has 12 public elementary schools and five public middle schools operated by the city government, and one public high school operated by the Ibaraki Prefectural Board of Education.

== Transportation ==
=== Railway ===
JR East – Jōban Line

- Minami-Nakagō - Isohara - Ōtsukō.

=== Highway ===
- Jōban Expressway – Kitaibaraki Interchange, Nakago Service Area, Sekimoto Parking Area
- National Route 6

== Sister cities ==
- Wairoa District, New Zealand

== Local attractions ==
- The scenic Izura coastline is near Otsu fishing port. This area was famous for Rokkaku-do, a six sided red house built by Tenshin Okakura. The Tenshin Memorial Museum, with regularly updated exhibits, offers visitors a glance at various schools of Japanese art. The sound of the waves of the Izura coast are listed as one of the 100 Soundscapes of Japan by the Japanese Ministry of the Environment
- Ujō Noguchi Memorial Museum

=== Festivals ===
- The Sasara of Hanazono Shrine is a Shishi Mai (ritual dance with a lion's mask) with a 900 year-tradition. This dance can be seen yearly on May 5 at the Hanazono Shrine.
- The Ofuna-Matsuri, the seafarer's festival, is held only once every five years. The first weekend in May, the festival is a prayer for large fish catches and protection from the clutches of the sea. A decorated ship is pulled by the seamen through the town toward a Shinto shrine. It was last held in 2014.
- August 16 is the last day of Obon (festival of the dead). On this day around 6 AM, families celebrating Obon gather at Otsu Port for Bonbune Nagashi. Miniature fishing boats laden with vegetables are paraded in the port, and afterwards lanterns are let out to see in order to guide home the spirits of the dead.
- The Kitaibaraki Citizen's Festival is held yearly on the last Saturday of August. There is a dance contest and fireworks.
- The 'Ujo no Sato Minato Matsuri' (port festival) is held in the beginning of November at Otsu Port. There are various cultural exhibits along with food and game stalls. There is also a demonstration of how to carve an angler fish.

== Notable people from Kitaibaraki ==
- Takehito Kanazawa, professional baseball player
- Atsuko Kurusu, actress
- Ujō Noguchi, poet, songwriter
