= Nakoso Station =

Railway station in Iwaki, Fukushima Prefecture, Japan

Nakoso Station 勿来駅
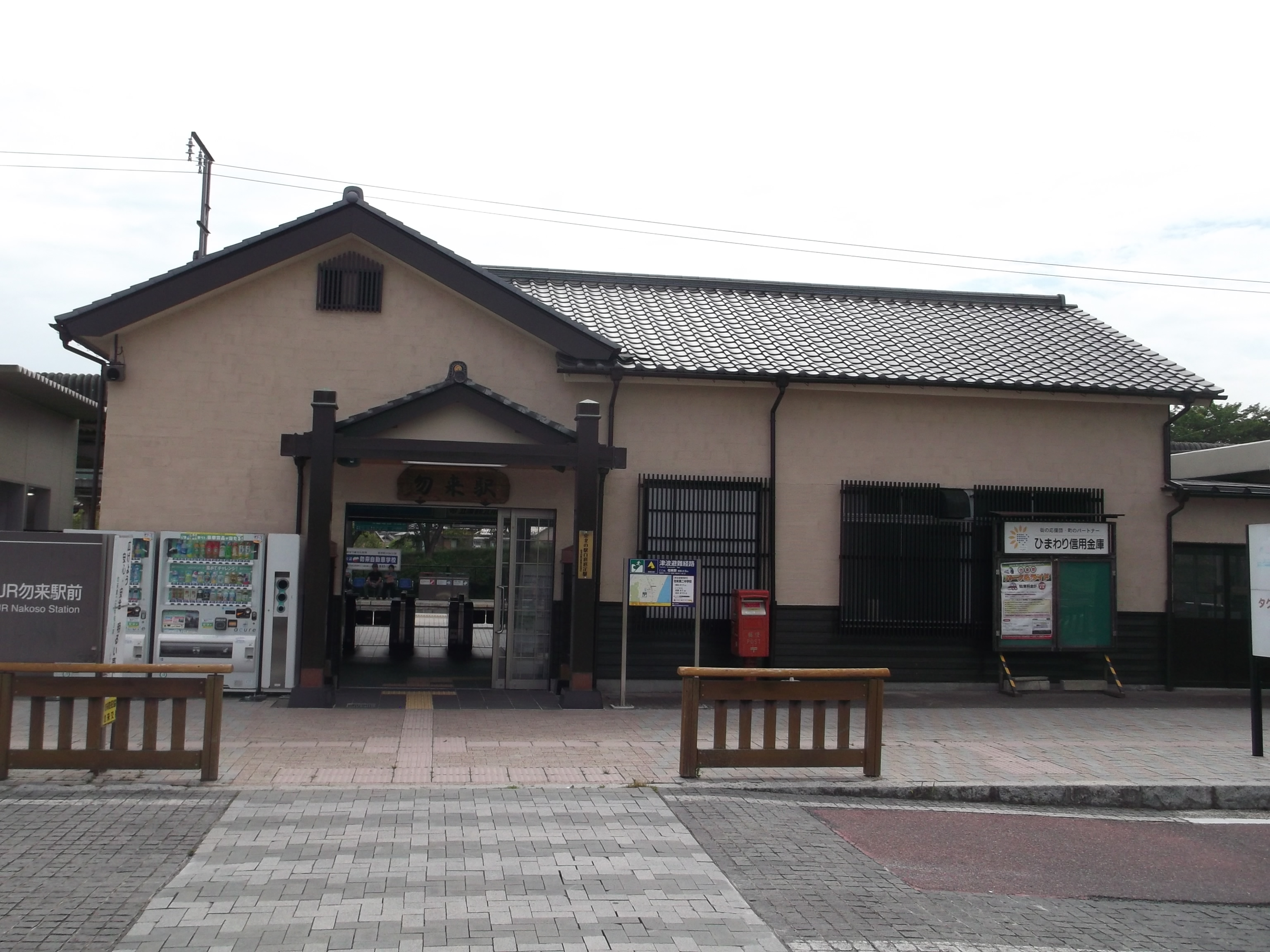
- Nakoso Station, July 2013

General information
- Location: Nakoso-machi Sekida-terashita 49-2, Iwaki-shi, Fukushima-ken 970-0000; Japan
- Coordinates: 36.8837°N 140.7864°E
- Operator: JR East
- Line: ■ Joban Line
- Distance: 183.2 km from Nippori
- Platforms: 2 side platforms
- Tracks: 2

Other information
- Status: Staffed
- Website: Official website

History
- Opened: 25 February 1897; 129 years ago

Passengers
- FY2018: 833 daily

Services
Preceding station	JR East	Following station
Isohara (limited service) towards Shinagawa	Hitachi (limited service)	Izumi towards Sendai
Ōtsukō towards Shinagawa	Jōban Line Local-Futsuu	Ueda towards Sendai
Location
- Location within Fukushima Prefecture Location within Japan

Nakoso Station (勿来駅, Nakoso eki) is a railway station located in the city of Iwaki, Fukushima Prefecture, Japan, operated by the East Japan Railway Company (JR East).

== Lines ==
Nakoso Station is served by the Jōban Line, and is located 183.2 km from the official starting point of the line at Nippori.

== Station layout ==
The station has two opposed side platforms connected by a footbridge. The station is staffed.

=== Platforms ===
1	■ Joban Line	for Isohara, Takahagi, Hitachi, Katsuta, Mito, Tomobe, Ishioka and Tsuchiura
1	■ Jōban Line (Limited Express)	for Takahagi, Mito, Ueno, Tokyo and Shinagawa
2	■ Jōban Line	for Iwaki, Hirono, Tomioka, Namie and Haranomachi
2	■ Jōban Line (Limited Express)	for Iwaki

== History ==
Nakoso Station was opened on 25 February 1897. The station was absorbed into the JR East network upon the privatization of the Japanese National Railways (JNR) on 1 April 1987.

== Passenger statistics ==
In fiscal 2018, the station was used by an average of 833 passengers daily (boarding passengers only).

== Surrounding area ==
- Nakoso Post Office
- National Route 6
- National Route 289

== See also ==
- List of railway stations in Japan
