= Fukushima Rinkai Railway Main Line =

Railway line in Japan

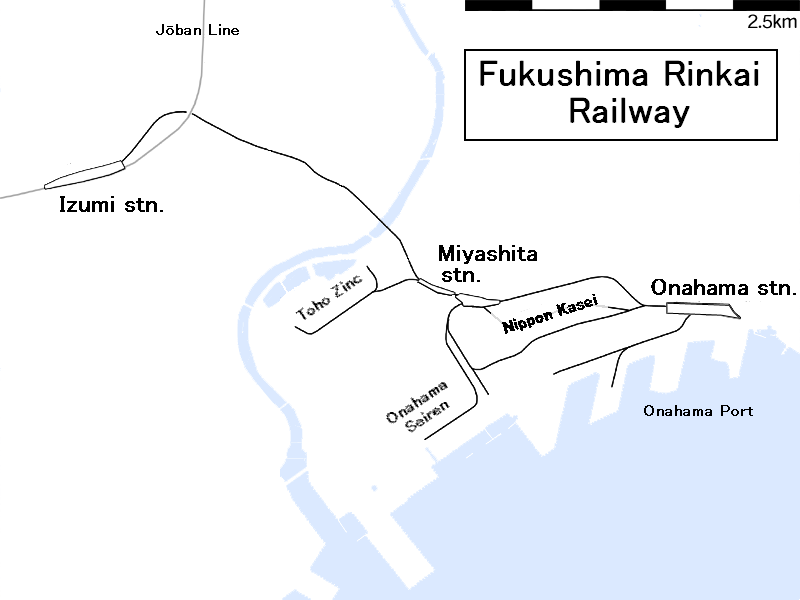
Line map (including some closed lines)

The Fukushima Rinkai Railway Main Line (福島臨海鉄道本線, Fukushima Rinkai Tetsudō Honsen) is a Japanese freight-only railway line from Izumi, serving Onahama Freight Terminal, all in Iwaki, Fukushima. It is the only railway line operated by the Fukushima Rinkai Railway (福島臨海鉄道, Fukushima Rinkai Tetsudō; "Fukushima Seaside Railway"), excluding a few more industrial railway lines. The third sector company had its roots as a horsecar operator, opened in 1907 to transport salt and fish. On the development of the Port of Onahama industrial area it changed to a railway line carrying zinc and containers. It had a passenger service until 1972.

== Basic data ==
- Distance: 5.4 km / 3.4 mi.
- Gauge: 1,067 mm (3 ft 6 in)
- Double track line: None
- Electrification: None
- Railway signalling: Tablet token

== History ==
The Onahama Horse tram opened a 762mm gauge line 5 km to its namesake town in 1907, and extended the line a further 5 km to Ena in 1916. The Onahama - Ena section closed in 1936, the company renamed itself the Onahama Port Railway in 1939, and converted the line to 1067mm gauge in 1941. The Ena Railway Co. rebuilt the Onahama - Ena section as 1067mm gauge in 1953. In 1965 a typhoon caused the collapse of a retaining wall, and the Onahama - Ena section formally closed in 1967. The passenger service on the Izumi - Onahama section ceased in 1972.

== Stations ==
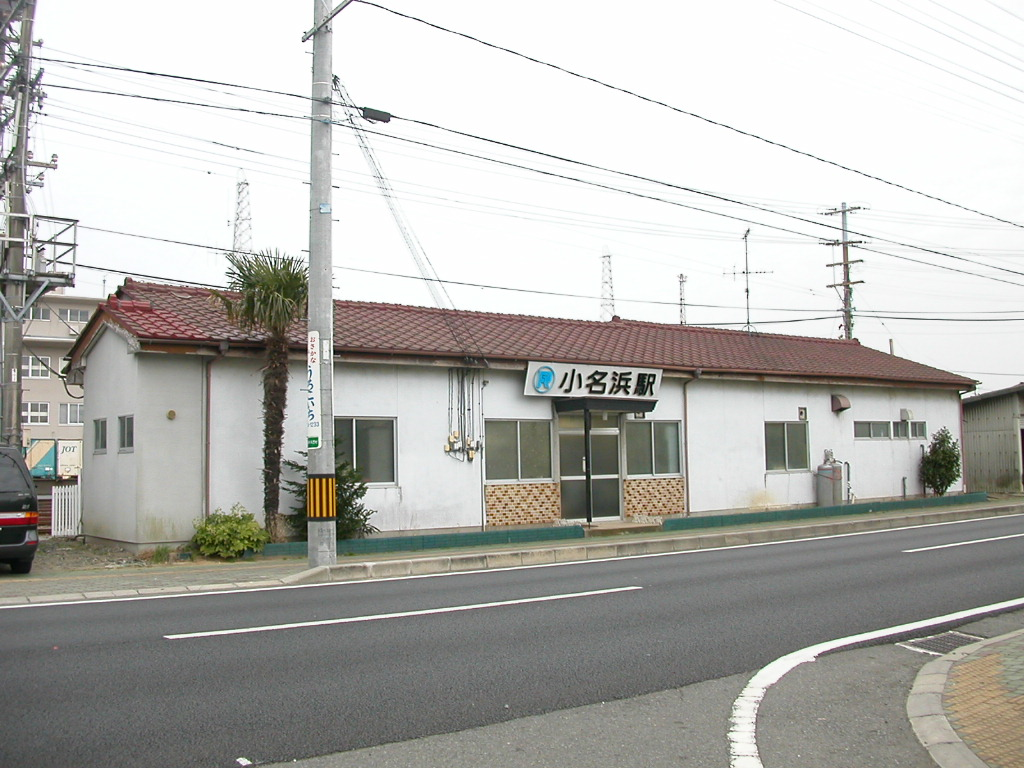
Onahama Freight Terminal

Station/Freight terminal	Japanese	Distance (km)	Transfers	Location
Izumi	泉	0.0	Jōban Line	Iwaki, Fukushima
Miyashita Freight Terminal	宮下	3.6		Iwaki, Fukushima
Onahama Freight Terminal	小名浜	5.4		Iwaki, Fukushima

== See also ==
- List of railway companies in Japan
- List of railway lines in Japan
