= Minami-Nakagō Station =

Railway station in Kitaibaraki, Ibaraki Prefecture, Japan

Minami-Nakagō Station 南中郷駅
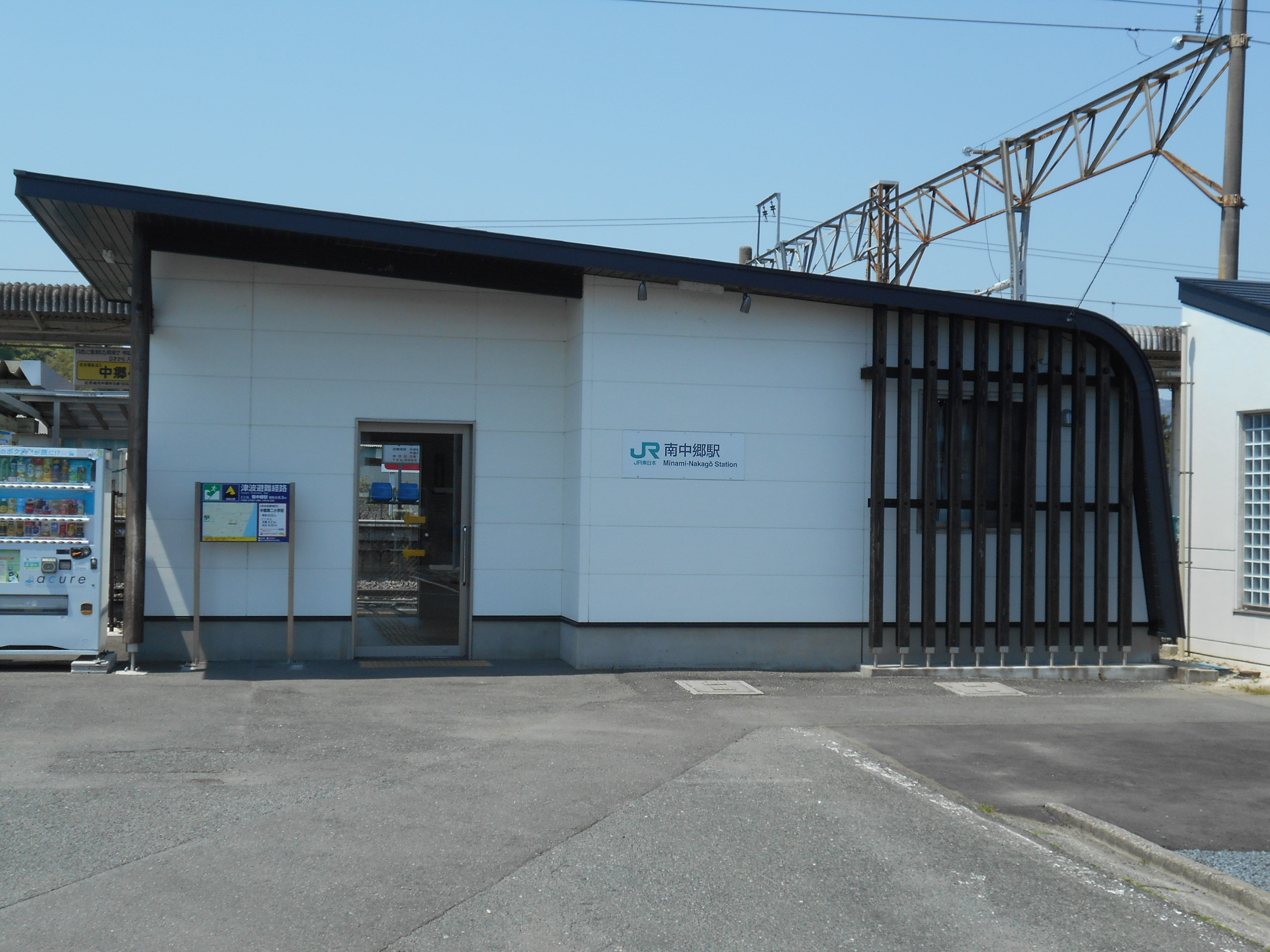
- Minami-Nakagō Station, April 2017

General information
- Location: Minami-Nakagō-cho Onoyasahi 238, Kitaibaraki-shi, Ibaraki-ken 319-1555; Japan
- Coordinates: 36.7533°N 140.7290°E
- Operator: JR East
- Line: ■ Jōban Line
- Distance: 167.0 km from Nippori
- Platforms: 1 side platform

Other information
- Status: unstaffed station
- Website: Official website

History
- Opened: 18 March 1910; 116 years ago

Passengers
- FY2021: 465 daily

Services
Preceding station	JR East	Following station
Takahagi towards Shinagawa	Jōban Line Local-Futsuu	Isohara towards Sendai
Location
- Location within Ibaraki Prefecture Location within Japan

Minami-Nakagō Station (南中郷駅, Minami-Nakagō-eki) is a passenger railway station located in the city of Kitaibaraki, Ibaraki Prefecture, Japan, operated by the East Japan Railway Company (JR East).

== Lines ==
Minami-Nakagō Station is served by the Jōban Line, and is located 167.0 km from the official starting point of the line at Nippori Station.

== Station layout ==
The station consists of one island platform connected to the station building by a footbridge. The station is Unstuffed.

=== Platforms ===
1	■ Jōban Line	for Takahagi, Hitachi, Katsuta, Mito, Tomobe, Ishioka and Tsuchiura
2	■ Jōban Line	for Isohara, Iwaki, Tomioka, Namie and Haranomachi

== History ==
Minami-Nakagō Station was opened on 1 February 1910 as a freight station to serve nearby coal mines, and began passenger operations on 18 March 1910. The station was absorbed into the JR East network upon the privatization of the Japanese National Railways (JNR) on 1 April 1987. A new station building was completed in March 2014.

== Passenger statistics ==
In fiscal 2019, the station was used by an average of 553 passengers daily (boarding passengers only).

== Surrounding area ==
- Minami-Nakagō Post Office
- National Route 6

== See also ==
- List of railway stations in Japan
