= Ōtsukō Station =

Railway station in Kitaibaraki, Ibaraki Prefecture, Japan

Ōtsukō Station 大津港駅
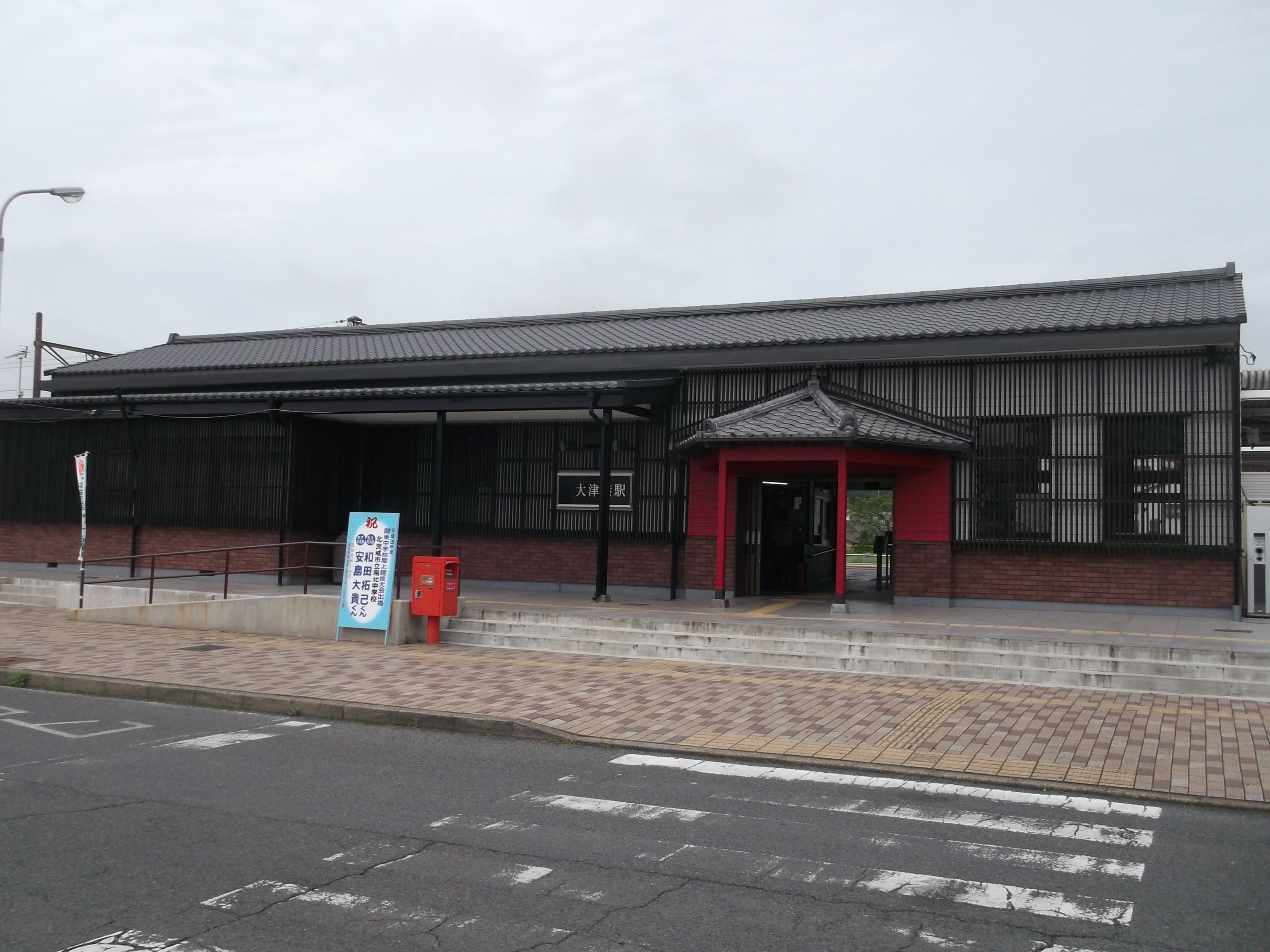
- Ōtsukō Station, July 2013

General information
- Location: Ōtsumachi Kitamachi 250, Kitaibaraki-shi, Ibaraki-ken 319-1704; Japan
- Coordinates: 36.8461°N 140.7779°E
- Operator: JR East
- Line: ■ Jōban Line
- Distance: 178.7 km from Nippori
- Platforms: 1 island + 1 side platform

Other information
- Status: Unstaffed
- Website: Official website

History
- Opened: 25 February 1897
- Former names: Sekimoto (until 1950)

Passengers
- FY2019: 839 daily

Services
Preceding station	JR East	Following station
Isohara towards Shinagawa	Jōban Line Local-Futsuu	Nakoso towards Sendai
Location
- Location within Ibaraki Prefecture Location within Japan

Ōtsukō Station (大津港駅, Ōtsukō-eki) is a passenger railway station located in the city of Kitaibaraki, Ibaraki Prefecture, Japan, operated by the East Japan Railway Company (JR East).

== Lines ==
Ōtsukō Station is served by the Jōban Line, and is located 178.7 km from the official starting point of the line at Nippori Station.

== Station layout ==
The station consists of one side platform and one island platform connected to the station building by a footbridge. The station is unattended.

=== Platforms ===
1, 2	■ Jōban Line	for Isohara, Takahagi, Hitachi, Katsuta, Mito, Tomobe, Ishioka and Tsuchiura
2, 3	■ Jōban Line	for Iwaki, Hirono, Tomioka, Namie and Haranomachi

== History ==
Ōtsukō Station was opened on 25 February 1897 as Sekimoto Station (関本駅). It was renamed to its present name on 10 May 1950. The station was absorbed into the JR East network upon the privatization of the Japanese National Railways (JNR) on 1 April 1987.

== Passenger statistics ==
In fiscal 2019, the station was used by an average of 839 passengers daily (boarding passengers only).

== Surrounding area ==
- Ōtsu Post Office
- National Route 6
- Izura Beach

== See also ==
- List of railway stations in Japan
