= Ena Railway =

The Ena Railway (江名鉄道, Ena Tetsudō) was a rural railway line in Fukushima Prefecture, Japan, which closed on 30 March 1968. It operated between Onahama-Sakaechō and Ena in Iwaki, Fukushima. The railway was operated by the Onahama Rinkō Railway.

== Description ==
- Distance: 4.9 km / 3.0 mi.
- Gauge: 1,067 mm (3 ft 6 in)
- Double-track line: None
- Electrification: None

== History ==
- 17 April 1916: The Iwaki Kaigan Tram (磐城海岸軌道, Iwaki Kaigai Kidō) (horse-drawn) opens between Onahama and Ena.
- 9 December 1936: The line closes.
- 12 January 1953: The line opens between Sakaechō and Ena. (Onahama - Sakaechō was opened by Onahama Rinkō Railway)
- September 1965: The line is damaged by a typhoon.
- 15 February 1966: Operation ceases.
- 30 March 1968: The line closes.

== Stations ==
- Sakaechō (栄町)
- Suisankōkōmae (水産高校前)
- Nagasaki (永崎)
- Mōjimae (馬落前)
- Ena (江名)

== See also ==
- List of railway lines in Japan
