= Takahagi =

Takahagi 高萩市
- City
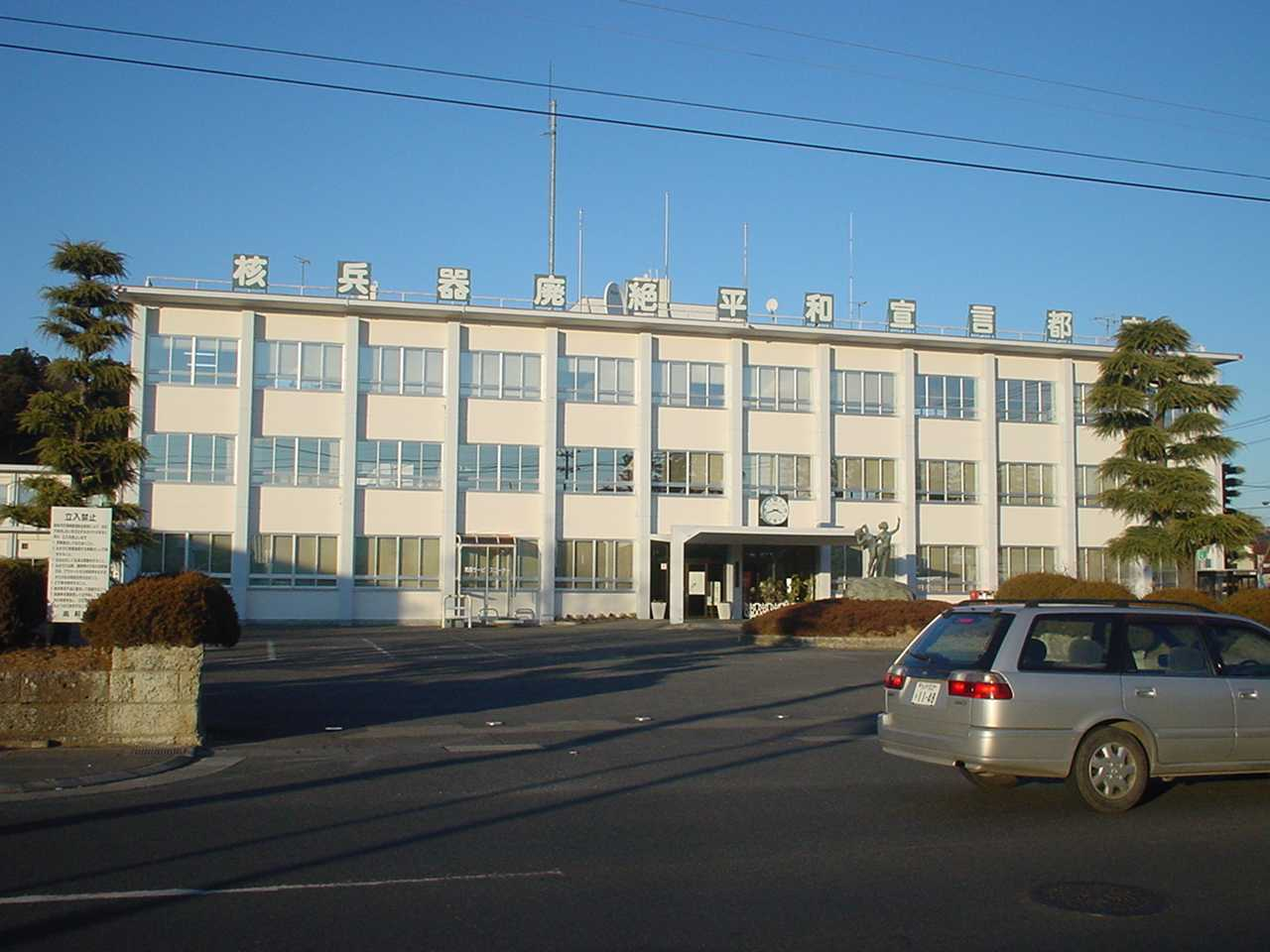
- Takahagi city hall

- Flag Emblem

- Location of Takahagi in Ibaraki Prefecture

- Coordinates: 36°43′9″N 140°43′0.2″E
- Country: Japan
- Region: Kantō
- Prefecture: Ibaraki

Area
  - Total: 193.58 km^{2} (74.74 sq mi)

Population (July 2020)
  - Total: 27,522
  - Density: 142.17/km^{2} (368.23/sq mi)
- Time zone: UTC+9 (Japan Standard Time)
- Tree: Pine
- Flower: Lespedeza
- Bird: Green pheasant
- Phone number: 0293-23-2111
- Address: 3-10-16 Kasuga-cho, Takahagi-shi, Ibaraki-ken 318-8511
- Website: Official website

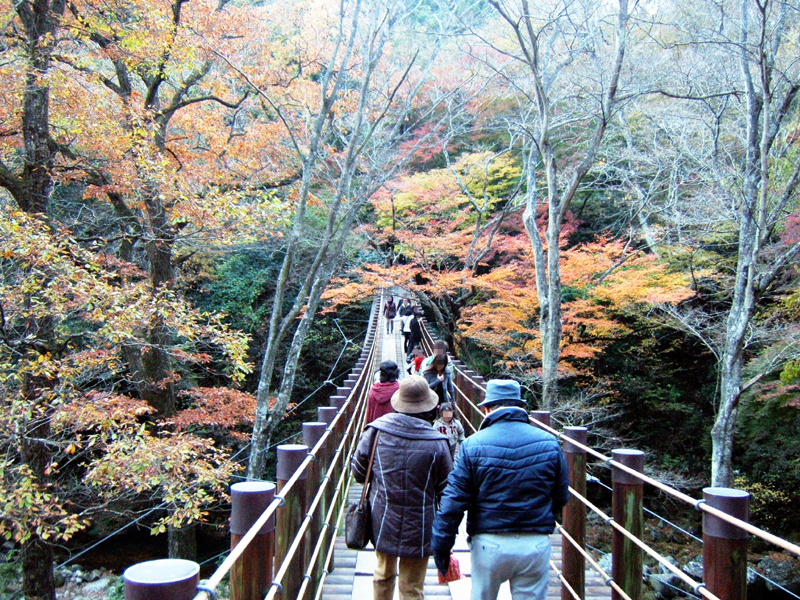
Hananuki valley

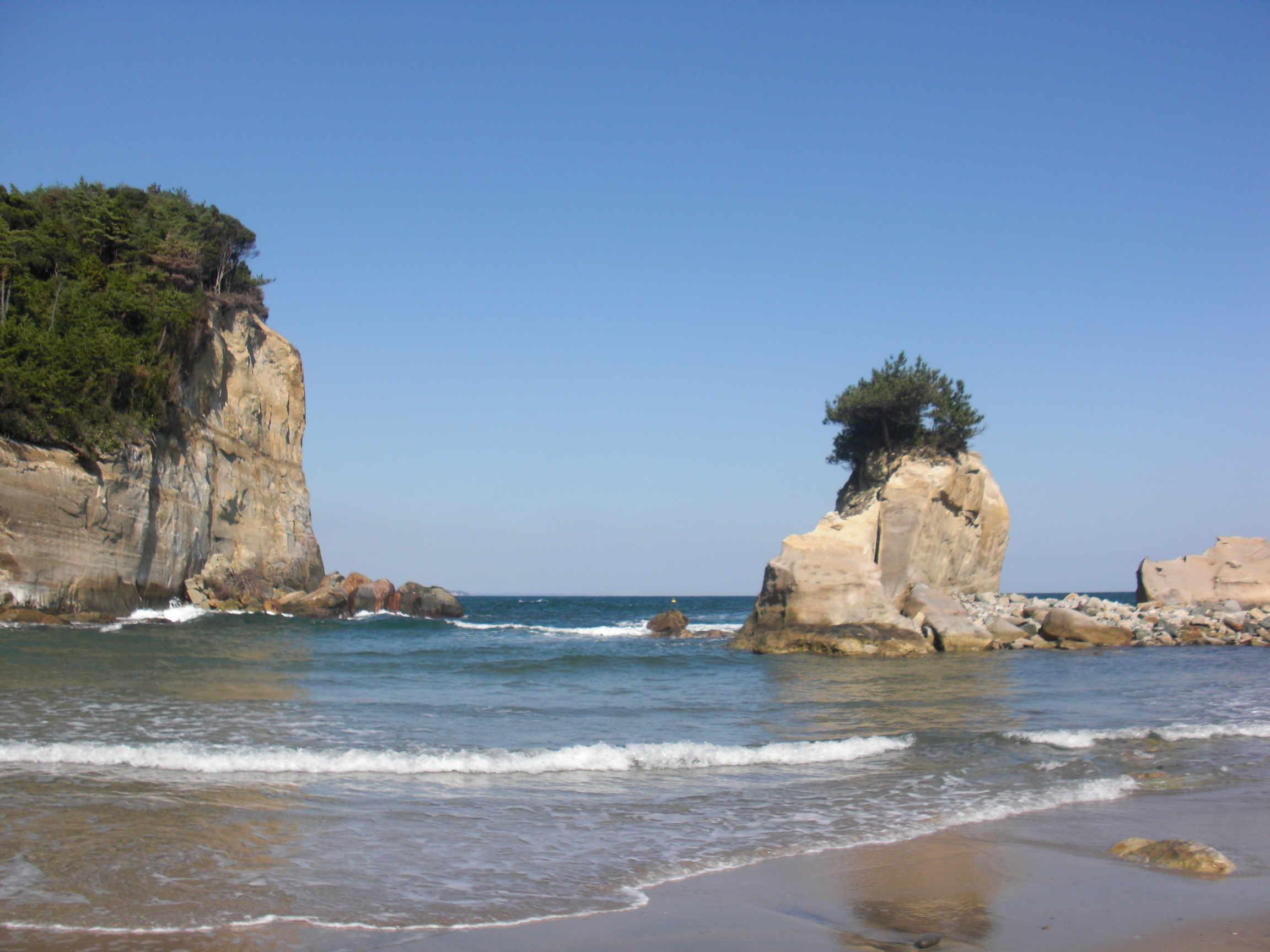
Takado Beach

Takahagi (高萩市, Takahagi-shi) is a city located in Ibaraki Prefecture, Japan. As of 1 July 2020, the city had an estimated population of 27,522 in 11,651 households and a population density of 140 persons per km^{2}. The percentage of the population aged over 65 was 36.2%. The total area of the city is 193.58 square kilometres (74.74 sq mi).

== Geography ==
Located in northern Ibaraki Prefecture, Takahagi is bordered by the Pacific Ocean to the east, and by Fukushima Prefecture to the northwest.

=== Surrounding municipalities ===
Fukushima Prefecture

- Hanawa

Ibaraki Prefecture

- Hitachi
- Hitachiōta
- Kitaibaraki

=== Climate ===
Takahagi has a Humid continental climate (Köppen Cfa) characterized by warm summers and cold winters with heavy snowfall. The average annual temperature in Takahagi is 13.9 °C. The average annual rainfall is 1429 mm with September as the wettest month. The temperatures are highest on average in August, at around 24.9 °C, and lowest in January, at around 3.8 °C.

== Demographics ==
Per Japanese census data, the population of Takahagi has declined in recent decades.

Historical population
| Year | Pop. | ±% |
|---|---|---|
| 1950 | 29,637 | — |
| 1960 | 32,816 | +10.7% |
| 1970 | 29,548 | −10.0% |
| 1980 | 32,436 | +9.8% |
| 1990 | 35,320 | +8.9% |
| 2000 | 32,602 | −7.7% |
| 2010 | 31,017 | −4.9% |
| 2020 | 27,699 | −10.7% |

== History ==
During the Edo period, Takahagi was the jōkamachi of Matsuoka Domain, one of the feudal domains of the Tokugawa shogunate in Hitachi Province, ruled by the Nakamura clan, the hereditary karō of Mito Domain. With the creation of the modern municipalities system after the Meiji Restoration on April 1, 1889, the town of Matsubara, and the villages of Matsuoka, Takaoka, Kurosaki and Kushigata was established within Taga District, Ibaraki. Matsuoka was raised to town status on April 17, 1928. Matsubara was renamed Takahagi on October 1, 1937.

Takahagi merged with Matsubara, Takaoka and Kurosaki on November 23, 1954, and was raised to city status. The city suffered considerable damage in the 2011 Tōhoku earthquake and tsunami.

== Government ==
Takahagi has a mayor-council form of government with a directly elected mayor and a unicameral city council of 14 members. Takahagi, together with neighboring Kitaibaraki, contributes two members to the Ibaraki Prefectural Assembly. In terms of national politics, the city is part of Ibaraki 5th district of the lower house of the Diet of Japan.

== Economy ==
Takahagi was once part of the Jōban coal fields, but the mines were exhausted by the 1960s. Since that time, the economy had been oriented towards light manufacturing and food processing. Agriculture and commercial fishing also play subordinate roles.

== Education ==
Takahagi has four public elementary schools and three public middle schools operated by the city government, and two public high schools operated by the Ibaraki Prefectural Board of Education. There is also one private high school

== Transportation ==
=== Railway ===
JR East – Jōban Line

- Takahagi

=== Highway ===
- Jōban Expressway – Takahagi Interchange
- National Route 6
- National Route 461

== Local attractions ==
- Hanazono-Hananuki Prefectural Nature Park
- Hananuki Dam
- Matsuoka Castle ruins
- Takado Beach

== Noted people from Takahagi ==
- Jinzō Matsumura, botanist
