= Ueda Station (Fukushima) =

Railway station in Iwaki, Fukushima Prefecture, Japan

Ueda Station 植田駅
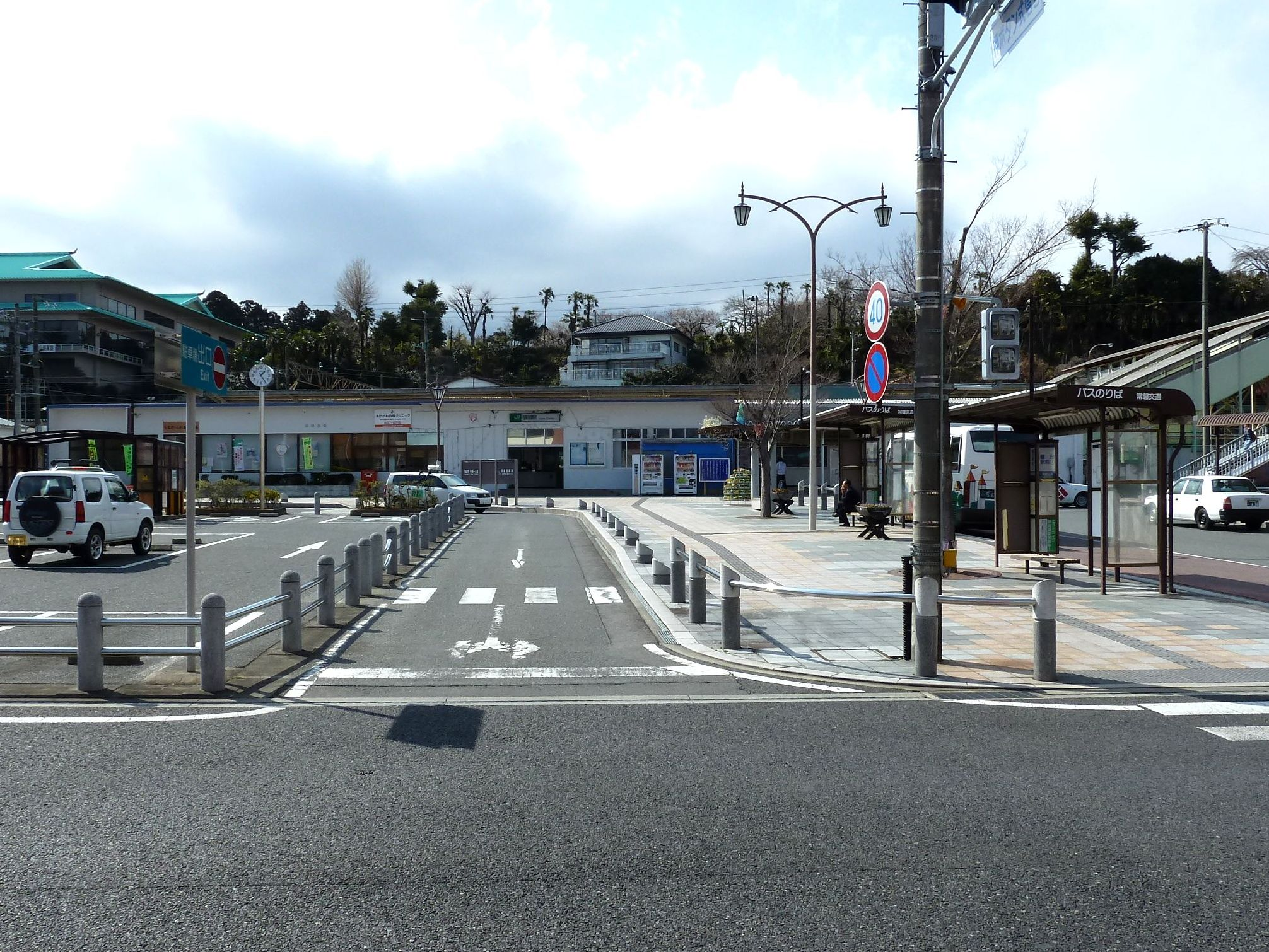
- Ueda Station in March 2011

General information
- Location: 15 Ueda-cho Kanebatake, Iwaki-shi, Fukushima-ken 974-8261; Japan
- Coordinates: 36°55′14″N 140°47′48″E
- Operator: JR East
- Line: ■ Joban Line
- Distance: 187.8 km from Nippori
- Platforms: 2 side platforms
- Tracks: 2

Other information
- Status: Staffed
- Website: Official website

History
- Opened: 25 February 1897

Passengers
- FY2018: 1852 daily

Services
Preceding station	JR East	Following station
Nakoso towards Shinagawa	Jōban Line Local-Futsuu	Izumi towards Sendai
Location
- Location within Fukushima Prefecture Location within Japan

Ueda Station (植田駅, Ueda eki) is a railway station on the Joban Line in the city of Iwaki, Fukushima Prefecture, Japan, operated by East Japan Railway Company (JR East).

== Lines ==
Ueda Station is served by the Jōban Line, and is located 187.8 km from the official starting point of the line at Nippori.

== Station layout ==
Ueda Station has two opposed side platforms connected to the station building by a footbridge. The station is staffed.

=== Platforms ===
1
2
■ Joban Line
■ Jōban Line
for Takahagi, Hitachi, Katsuta, Mito, Tomobe, Ishioka and Tsuchiura
for Iwaki, Hirono, Tomioka,

Namie and Haranomachi

== History ==
Ueda Station was opened on 25 February 1897. The station was absorbed into the JR East network upon the privatization of the Japanese National Railways (JNR) on 1 April 1987.

== Passenger statistics ==
In fiscal 2018, the station was used by an average of 1852 passengers daily (boarding passengers only).

== Surrounding area ==
- Ueki Post Office
- National Route 6

== See also ==
- List of railway stations in Japan
