= Shinjō Domain =

Shinjō Domain 新庄藩
- under Tokugawa shogunate Japan
- 1622–1871
- Capital: Shinjō Castle
  - Type: Daimyō
- Historical era: Edo period
  - Established: 1622
  - Disestablished: 1871
- Today part of: part of Yamagata Prefecture

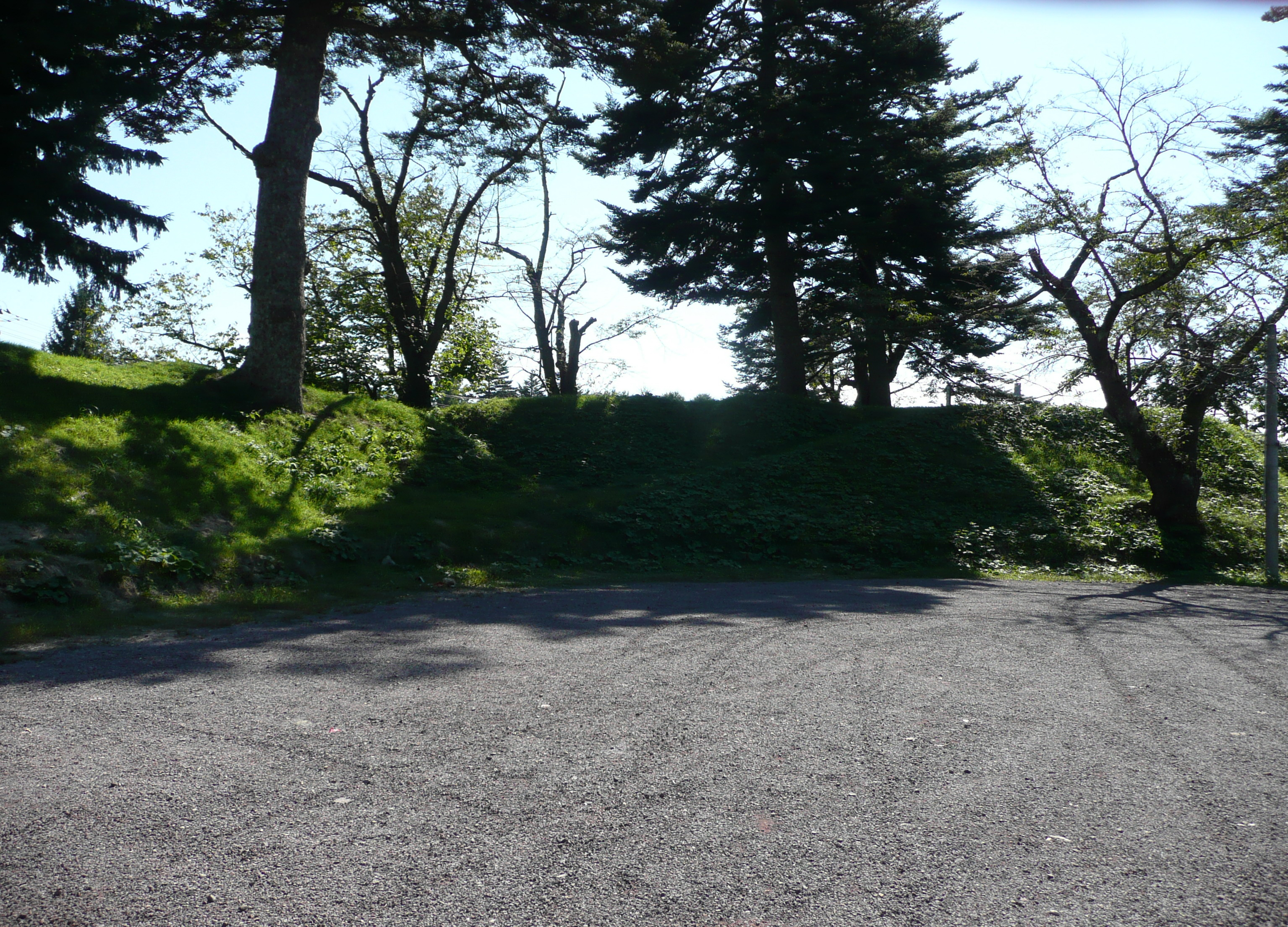
Walls of Shinjō Castle, administrative center of Shinjō Domain

Shinjō Domain (新庄藩, Shinjō-han) was a Japanese domain of the Edo period, located in Dewa Province Japan and ruled by the Tozawa clan. It was centered on Shinjō Castle in what is now the city of Shinjō, Yamagata and occupied all of what is now Mogami District with 86 villages and part of Kitamurayama District with 16 villages in modern-day Yamagata Prefecture.

== History ==
Much of Dewa Province was controlled by the powerful Mogami clan during the Sengoku period. The Mogami established a subsidiary holding centered on Sakanobe Castle in what is now Mamurogawa in Yamagata, based on the Sengoku-period foundations of a structure erected by the Onodera clan. However, the Mogami were dispossessed by the Tokugawa shogunate in 1622, with the majority of their holdings going to the Satake clan, who were transferred from Hitachi Province to their new (and much smaller) holdings at Kubota Domain.

Tozawa Moriyasu, a relatively minor daimyō originally from Kakunodate in Dewa Province served Toyotomi Hideyoshi at the Battle of Odawara in 1590; however, he fell ill and died shortly thereafter. His son, Tozawa Masamori sided with Tokugawa Ieyasu at the Battle of Sekigahara, and was eventually promoted to the status of a 40,000-koku daimyō at Hitachi-Matsuoka Domain in Hitachi Province. When the Mogami were dispossessed, the Tokugawa shogunate transferred him from Hitachi to the newly created Shinjō Domain, and increased his revenues to 60,000 koku, where his descendants ruled for 11 generations to the Meiji Restoration.

In 1625, due to development of new rice lands, the domain's official revenues were increased to 68,200 koku. Masamori died in 1650, and his son Tozawa Masanobu ruled for the next 60 years, providing the domain with an exceptionally long period of stability and prosperity. Its actual revenues in the Genroku era were estimated at 132,000 koku, and its population approached 60,000 inhabitants. However, towards the end of Masanobu's era, and under his son Tozawa Masatsune, the domain suffered severely from lax taxation and fiscal policies, and repeated crop shortages in the Hōei, Tenmei and Tenpyō eras. From the 5th daimyō, Tozawa Masanobu through the 10th daimyō, Tozawa Masayoshi, the domain attempted to implement fiscal austerity policies, and to introduce new sources of revenue (such as sericulture), but with little effect in removing the deep debt burden on domain finances.

During the Boshin War of the Meiji Restoration, Shinjō Domain was initially in favor of the Satchō Alliance, but later became a member of the Ōuetsu Reppan Dōmei. However, after Kubota Domain switched sides to favor the Meiji government, Shinjō Domain soon followed. Neighboring Shōnai Domain, outraged by the betrayal, sent its army to invade Shinjō Domain, and after a fierce battle, destroyed Shinjō Castle and much of the surrounding castle town. The 11th daimyō, Tozawa Masazane escaped to Kubota Castle, where he remained in exile for 70 days until his domain was liberated by forces loyal to the new Meiji government.

On June 2, 1869, the new government awarded Shinjō Domain with an increase in revenues of 15,000 koku. However, later the same month, the government issued a decree abolishing the domain system. The former domain was absorbed into Yamagata Prefecture in July 1871.

== List of daimyōs ==
- Tozawa clan (fudai) 1622–1871

#	Name	Tenure	Courtesy title	Court Rank	revenues
1	Tozawa Masamori (戸沢政盛)	1622–1648	Ukyo-no-suke (右京亮)	Lower 5th (従五位下)	60,000 koku
2	Tozawa Masanobu (戸沢正誠)	1650–1710	Kozuke-no-suke (上総介)	Lower 5th (従五位下)	68,200 koku
3	Tozawa Masatsune (戸沢正庸)	1710–1737	Kozuke-no-suke (上総介)	Lower 5th (従五位下)	68,200 koku
4	Tozawa Masakatsu (戸沢正勝)	1737–1745	Kozuke-no-suke (上総介)	Lower 5th (従五位下)	68,200 koku
5	Tozawa Masanobu (戸沢正諶)	1745–1765	Kozuke-no-suke (上総介)	Lower 5th (従五位下)	68,200 koku
6	Tozawa Masatada (戸沢正産)	1765–1780	Kozuke-no-suke (上総介)	Lower 5th (従五位下)	68,200 koku
7	Tozawa Masasuke (戸沢正良)	1780–1786	Kazue-no-suke (主計頭)	Lower 5th (従五位下)	68,200 koku
8	Tozawa Masachika (戸沢正親)	1786–1796	Kozuke-no-suke (上総介)	Lower 5th (従五位下)	68,200 koku
9	Tozawa Masatane (戸沢正胤)	1796–1840	Ukyo-no-suke (右京亮)	Lower 5th (従五位下)	68,200 koku
10	Tozawa Masayoshi (戸沢正令)	1840–1843	Noto-no-kami (能登守)	Lower 5th (従五位下)	68,200 koku
11	Tozawa Masazane (戸沢正実)	1843–1871	Kozuke-no-suke (上総介)	4th (従四位下), Viscount	68,200 -->83,200 koku
