= Tozawa Masamori =

- 戸沢 政盛
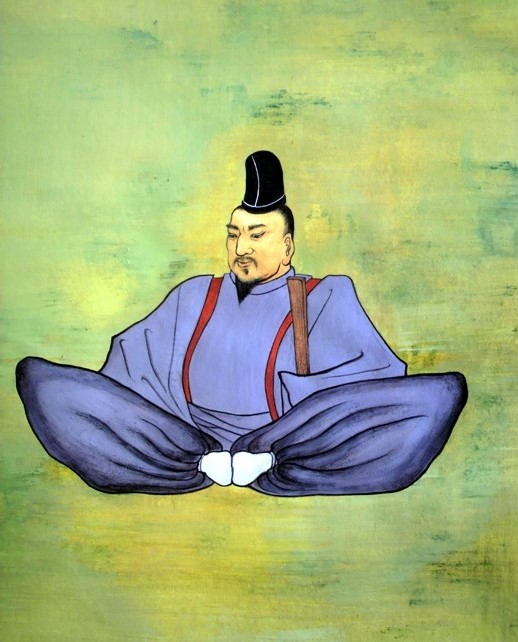

1st Daimyō of Matsuoka Domain
- In office 1602–1622
- Monarchs: Shōgun: Tokugawa Ieyasu; Tokugawa Hidetada
- Preceded by: -none-
- Succeeded by: Nakayama Nobuyoshi

1st Daimyō of Shinjō Domain
- In office 1622–1648
- Monarch: Shōgun: Tokugawa Iemitsu
- Preceded by: none -
- Succeeded by: Tozawa Masanobu

Personal details
- Born: 1585 Dewa Province, Japan
- Died: March 16, 1648 (aged 62–63)
- Spouse(s): Mamuro Gozen, daughter of Torii Mototada of Yahagi Domain
- Relations: Father: Tozawa Moriyasu

Tozawa Masamori (戸沢 政盛; 1585– March 16, 1648) was the 1st daimyō of Shinjō Domain in Dewa Province, Japan (part of modern-day Yamagata Prefecture). His courtesy title was Ukyō-no-kami, and his Court rank was Junior Fifth Rank, Lower Grade.

== Biography ==
Tozawa Masamori was the eldest son of Tozawa Moriyasu, but as his mother was a peasant girl whom Moriyasu had met in a falconry hunt, he was not expected to inherit. Masamori's mother was subsequent married off to a yamabushi and Masamori was raised as a peasant. However, Moriyasu's death in 1590, followed by that of his uncle Tozawa Mitsumori in 1592, left the clan leaderless and to avoid the possibility of attainder, the clan's retainers tracked Masamori down, murdered his stepfather, and brought him before Toyotomi Hideyoshi as heir, with Mitsumori's widow as his adopted mother. He fought in the Battle of Sekigahara for the eastern side, and was subsequently awarded a 40,000 koku domain of Matsuoka Domain in Hitachi Province and this he became daimyō under the Tokugawa shogunate.

During the winter campaign at the Siege of Osaka he was assigned as castellan of Odawara Castle and during the summer campaign he was castellan of Edo Castle. For these services, Shōgun Tokugawa Ieyasu arranged a marriage between Tozawa Masamori and a daughter of Torii Mototada. Following the attainder of the Mogami clan, he accompanied Torii Tadamasa to Dewa Province and was subsequently assigned a portion of the former Mogami lands, which became Shinjō Domain (60,000 koku). The Tozawa clan remained at Shinjō until the Meiji restoration.

== Heraldry ==
- banner: twelve black and white stripes
- great standard: three white umbrellas
- messenger's sashimono: a black horo with two flags
- ashigaru: red disc on blue
- lesser standard: gold horns above a red disc on blue
- sashimono: as for the ashigaru but with a plume
