= Miho, Ibaraki =

Miho 美浦村
- Village
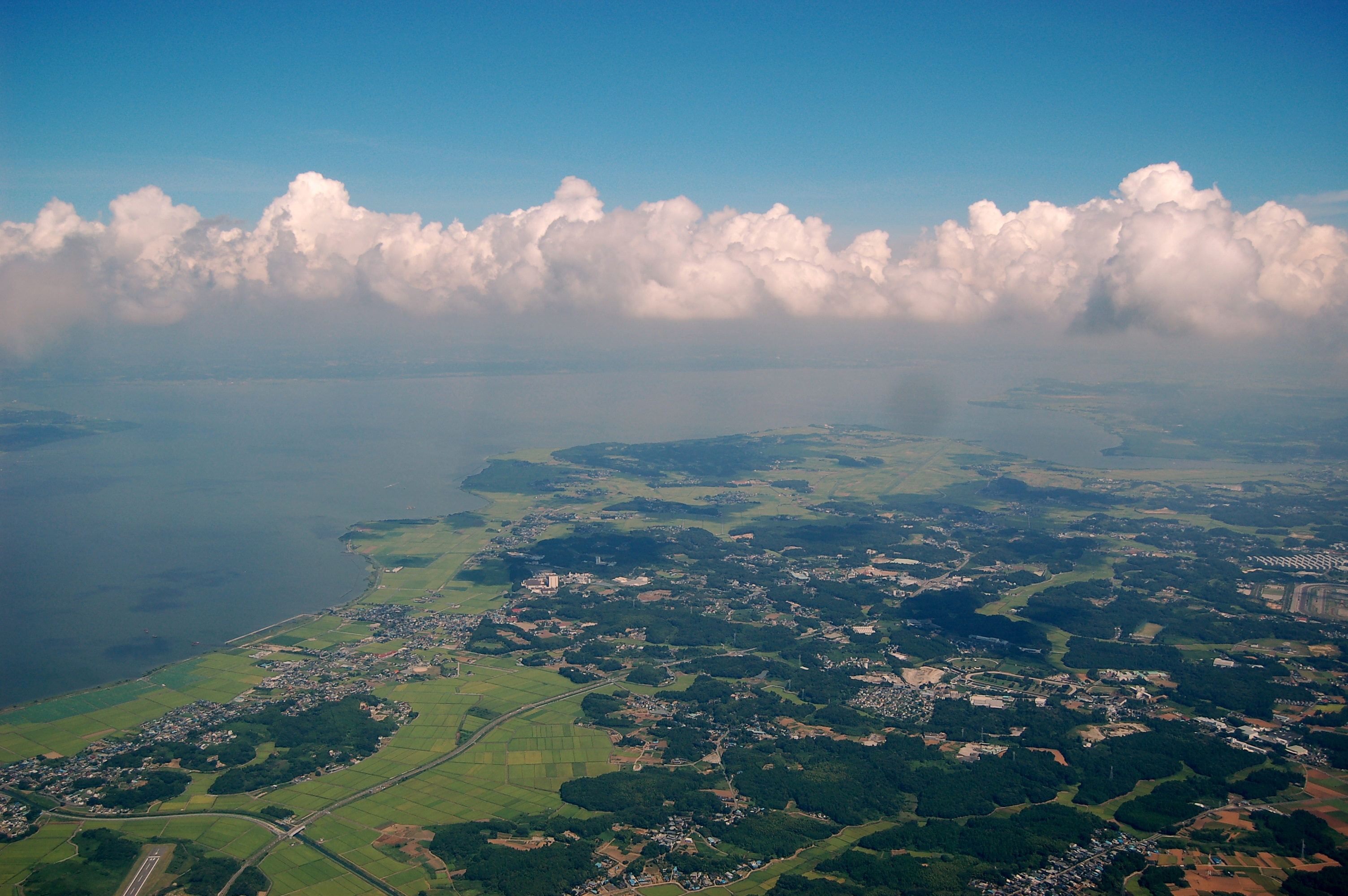
- Miho Village as seen from the west. Lake Kasumigaura on the left.

- Flag Seal

- Location of Miho in Ibaraki Prefecture

- Coordinates: 36°0′16.3″N 140°18′6.8″E
- Country: Japan
- Region: Kantō
- Prefecture: Ibaraki
- District: Inashiki

Area
  - Total: 66.61 km^{2} (25.72 sq mi)

Population (October 2020)
  - Total: 14,504
  - Density: 217.7/km^{2} (564.0/sq mi)
- Time zone: UTC+9 (Japan Standard Time)
- Tree: Wild cherry tree
- Flower: Golden-rayed lily
- Phone number: 029-885-0340
- Address: 1515 Ukeryo, Miho-mura, Inashiki-gun, Ibaraki-ken 300-0492
- Website: Official website

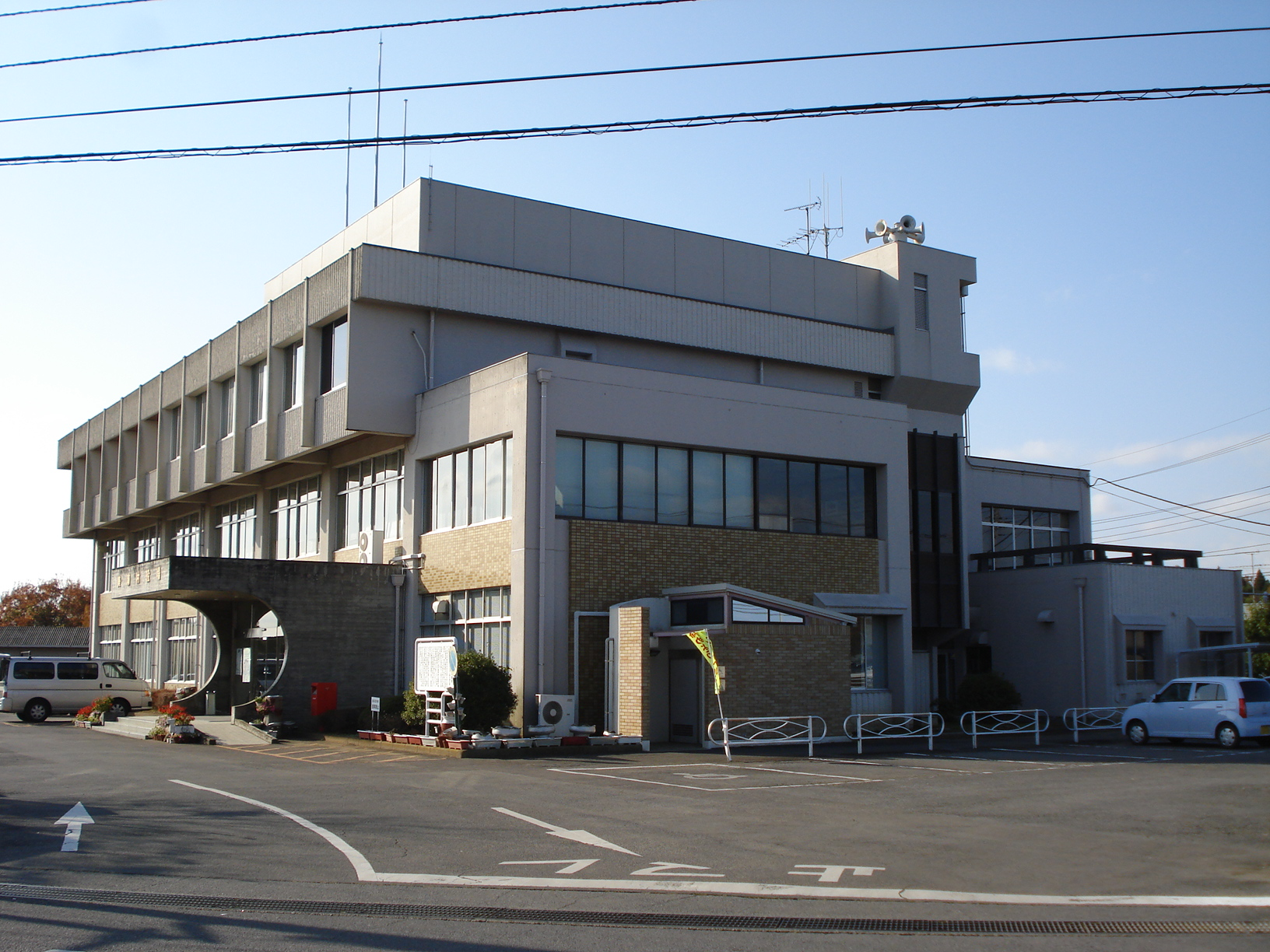
Miho village hall

Miho (美浦村, Miho-mura) is a village located in Ibaraki Prefecture, Japan. As of 1 October 2020, the village had an estimated population of 14,504 in 5907 households and a population density of 218 persons per km^{2}. The percentage of the population aged over 65 was 32.0%. The total area of the village is 66.61 square kilometres (25.72 sq mi).

== Geography ==
Located in southern Ibaraki Prefecture, Miho is bordered by Lake Kasumigaura to the north and east.

=== Surrounding municipalities ===
Ibaraki Prefecture

- Ami
- Inashiki

=== Climate ===
Miho has a Humid continental climate (Köppen Cfa) characterized by warm summers and cool winters with light snowfall. The average annual temperature in Miho is 13.9 °C. The average annual rainfall is 1344 mm with September as the wettest month. The temperatures are highest on average in August, at around 25.9 °C, and lowest in January, at around 3.1 °C.

== Demographics ==
Per Japanese census data, the population of Miho peaked around the year 2000 and has declined since.

Historical population
Year	Pop.	±%
1950	9,992	—
1960	9,178	−8.1%
1970	8,066	−12.1%
1980	13,509	+67.5%
1990	14,348	+6.2%
2000	18,219	+27.0%
2010	17,299	−5.0%
2020	14,602	−15.6%

== History ==
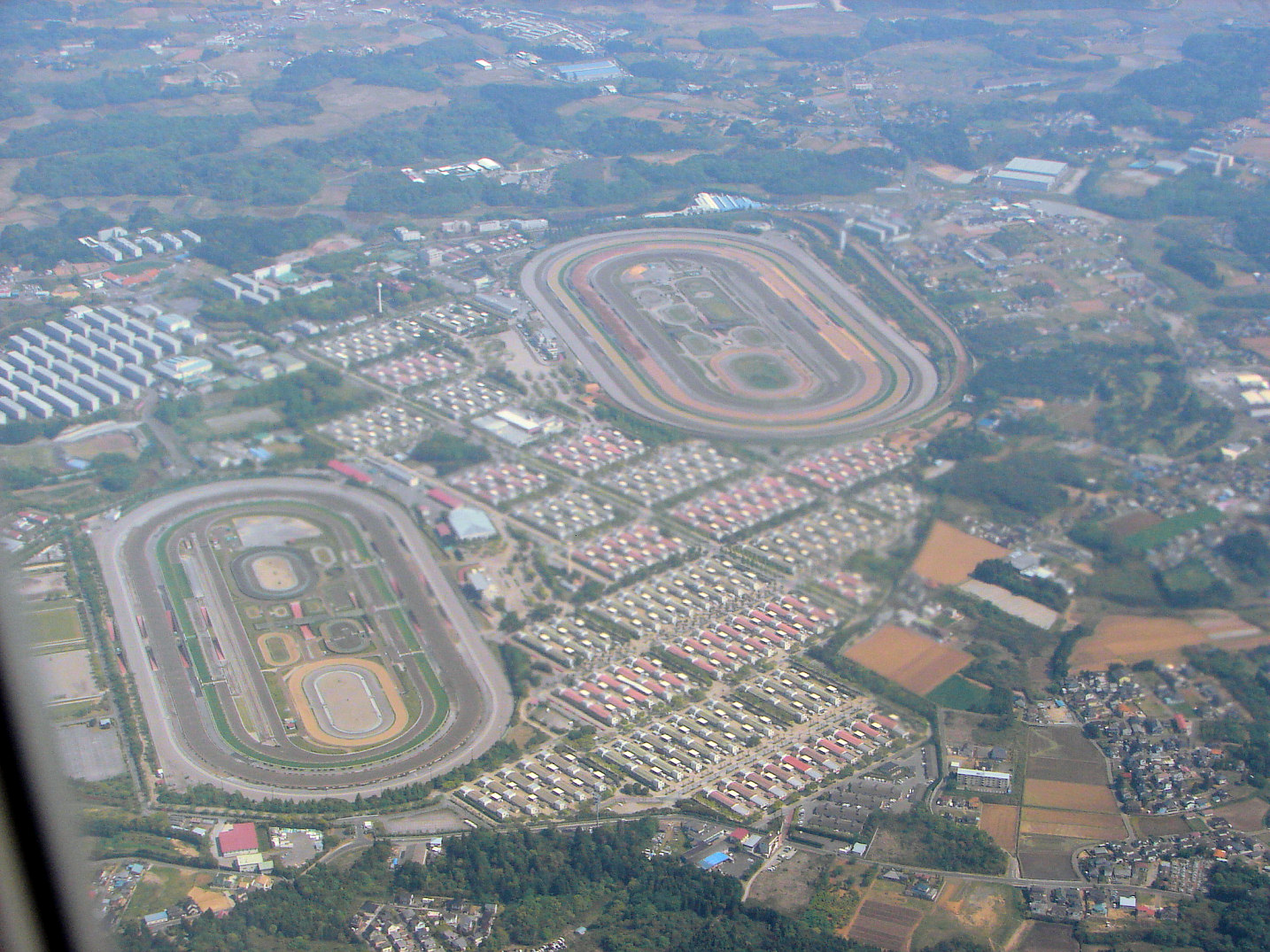
Miho Training Center

The villages of Kihara and Anju were created with the establishment of the modern municipalities system on April 1, 1889. The two villages were merged to form the village of Miho on April 1, 1955. In April 10, 1978, the Miho Training Center was opened by the Japan Racing Association (JRA), which was one of two racehorse training facilities operated by the JRA (the other being the Ritto Training Center in Ritto, Shiga).

== Government ==
Miho has a mayor-council form of government with a directly elected mayor and a unicameral village council of 12 members. Miho contributes one member to the Ibaraki Prefectural Assembly. In terms of national politics, the village is part of Ibaraki 6th district of the lower house of the Diet of Japan.

== Economy ==
The economy of Miho is primarily agricultural, including aquaculture on Lake Kasumigaura.

== Education ==
- Miho has three public elementary schools and one public middle school operated by the village government. The village does not have public high school, but the Ibaraki Prefectural Board of Education operates a special education school for the handicapped.

== Transportation ==
=== Railway ===
- Miho does not have any passenger rail service.

=== Highway ===
- National Route 125

== Local attractions ==
- Site of Kihara Castle
- Akadaira Shell Midden

== International relations ==
- Lingui District, Guilin, Guangxi Zhuang Autonomous Region, China, friendship city

== Noted people from Miho ==
- Eijiro Ai, professional baseball player
