= Rentsen Enkhbat =

Rentsen Enkhbat is the current director of the Institute Mathematics at the National University of Mongolia in Ulaanbaatar, Mongolia. He is a professor of mathematics at the Business School of National University of Mongolia.

== Education ==
He received his bachelor's, master's and Ph.D. degrees from Irkutsk State University (Russia) in applied mathematics in 1980 and 1990, respectively. He received also his master's degree in economics from National University of Mongolia in 1998 and Sc.D degree from Mongolian Academy of Sciences in 2003.

== Awards and recognition ==
His awards include prize of the Third World and Mongolian Academy of Sciences, award of Consortium of Mongolian Higher Education Universities, and Government Medal.

He is the author and co-author 16 books and the editor of 17 books. He has written more than 100 scientific papers. His recent research interest lies in Global Optimization, Optimal Control and Game theory. He has held visiting appointments at the University of Massachusetts, Kyoto University, Ibaraki University, Humboldt University of Berlin, University of Florida, Korea Institute for Advanced Study, Inje University (Korea), Curtin University (Australia), and Littoral University (France). He is a member of American and Mongolian Mathematical Societies, and USA and Mongolian Chess Federations. He is a Mongolian National Chess Master.

One of his major career achievements was solving the complex Malfatti problem using global optimization theory.
