= Miho Training Center =

Japan Racing Association training facility in Ibaraki Prefecture, Japan

- 美浦トレーニングセンター
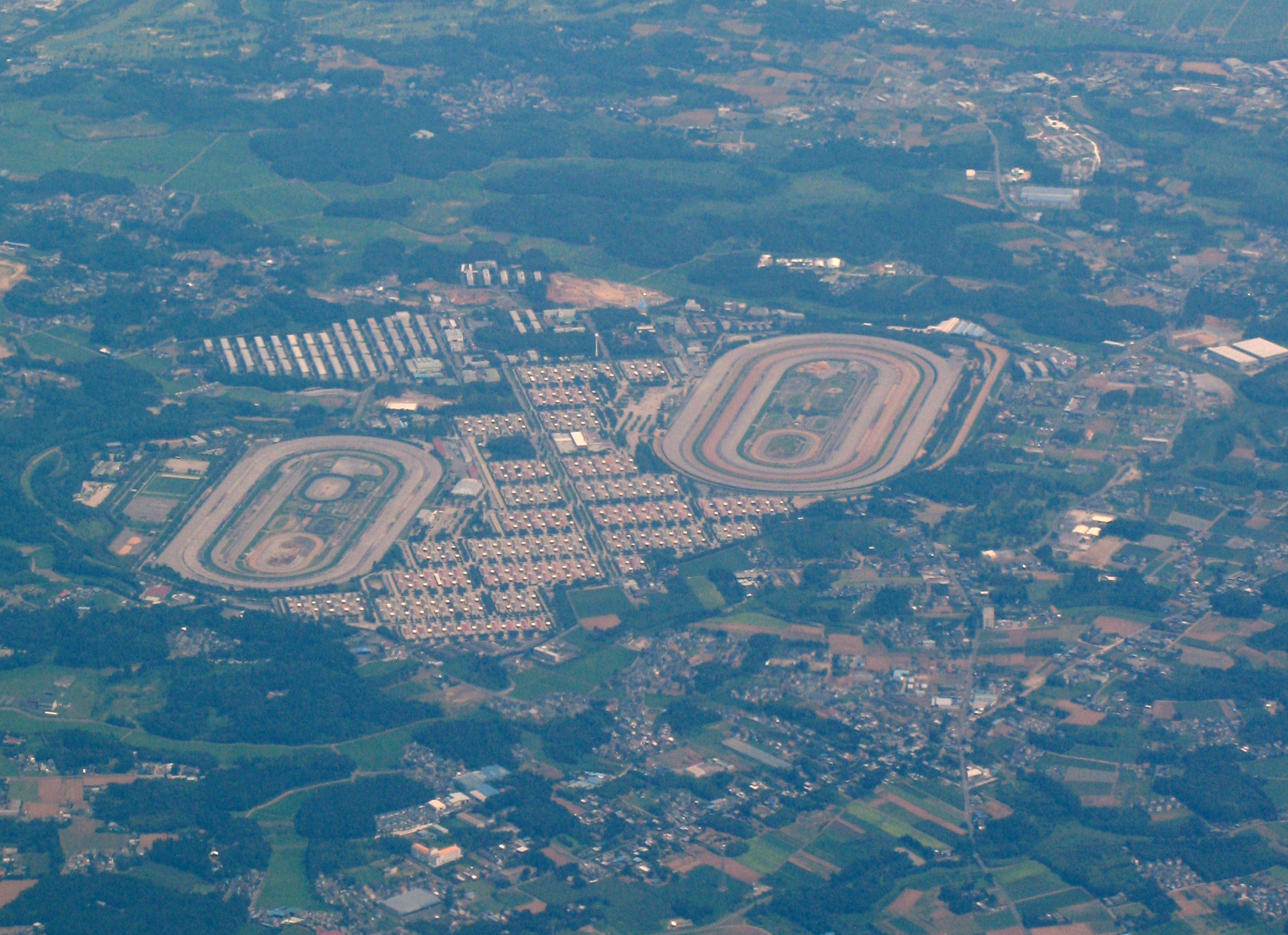
- Aerial view of the Miho Training Center
- Interactive map of the Miho Training Center area

General information
- Location: Miho, Inashiki District, Ibaraki Prefecture, Japan
- Coordinates: 35°59′3.5″N 140°18′29.5″E
- Owner: Japan Racing Association
- Operator: Japan Racing Association

Miho Training Center (Japanese: 美浦トレーニングセンター, Miho Torēningu Sentā) is a Japan Racing Association (JRA) facility in Miho, Ibaraki Prefecture, Japan. It serves as the primary training base for East Japan (Kanto) racehorses.

== History and facilities ==
The facility opened on 10 April 1978, consolidating stables previously located at Tokyo, Nakayama, and Shiroi. It is the largest racehorse training facility in Japan, accommodating over 2,600 horses across six tracks, including a 2,000-metre woodchip course, a steeplechase course, and a 33-metre elevation hill road completed in 2023. The site includes on-site housing for approximately 5,000 racing personnel and their families.

== Operations ==
Since the late 1980s, horses based at Miho (Kanto horses) statistically underperformed compared to those based at the Ritto Training Center (Kansai horses), a disparity referred to as "west high east low". To mitigate this, some Miho trainers utilize "Ritto study abroad" (Ritto ryūgaku), transporting horses to Ritto for pre-race training ahead of Kansai-based events. In 2023, Kanto horses won more flat GI races than Kansai horses for the first time in 25 years.

== Individuals associated with Miho ==
- Masayoshi Ebina
- Kazuo Fujisawa
- Nanako Fujita
- Noriyuki Hori
- Tetsuya Kimura
- Sakae Kunieda
- Yukio Okabe
- Takeshi Okumura
- Kosei Miura
- Yoshitomi Shibata
- Yūichi Shikato
- Hiroyasu Tanaka
- Keita Tosaki
- Akihide Tsumura
- Kazuo Yokoyama
- Norihiro Yokoyama
- Takeshi Yokoyama
- Tomio Yokoyama

== See also ==
- Ritto Training Center
