= Shintone =

Shintone 新利根町
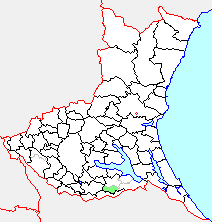
- Map of Shintone (green), Ibaraki. Established April 1, 1955. Disestablished March 22, 2005.

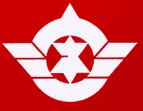
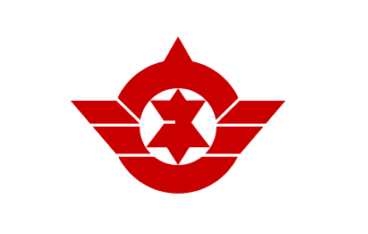
- Flag Seal
- Interactive map of Shintone
- Coordinates: 35°54′41″N 140°17′42″E
- Country: Japan
- Region: Kantō
- Prefecture: Ibaraki
- District: Inashiki

Area
  - Total: 29.74 km^{2} (11.48 sq mi)

Population (March 1, 2005)
  - Total: 10,391
  - Density: 349.4/km^{2} (904.9/sq mi)
- Tree: Sakura
- Flower: Chrysanthemum × morifolium
  - Bird: Japanese bush warbler

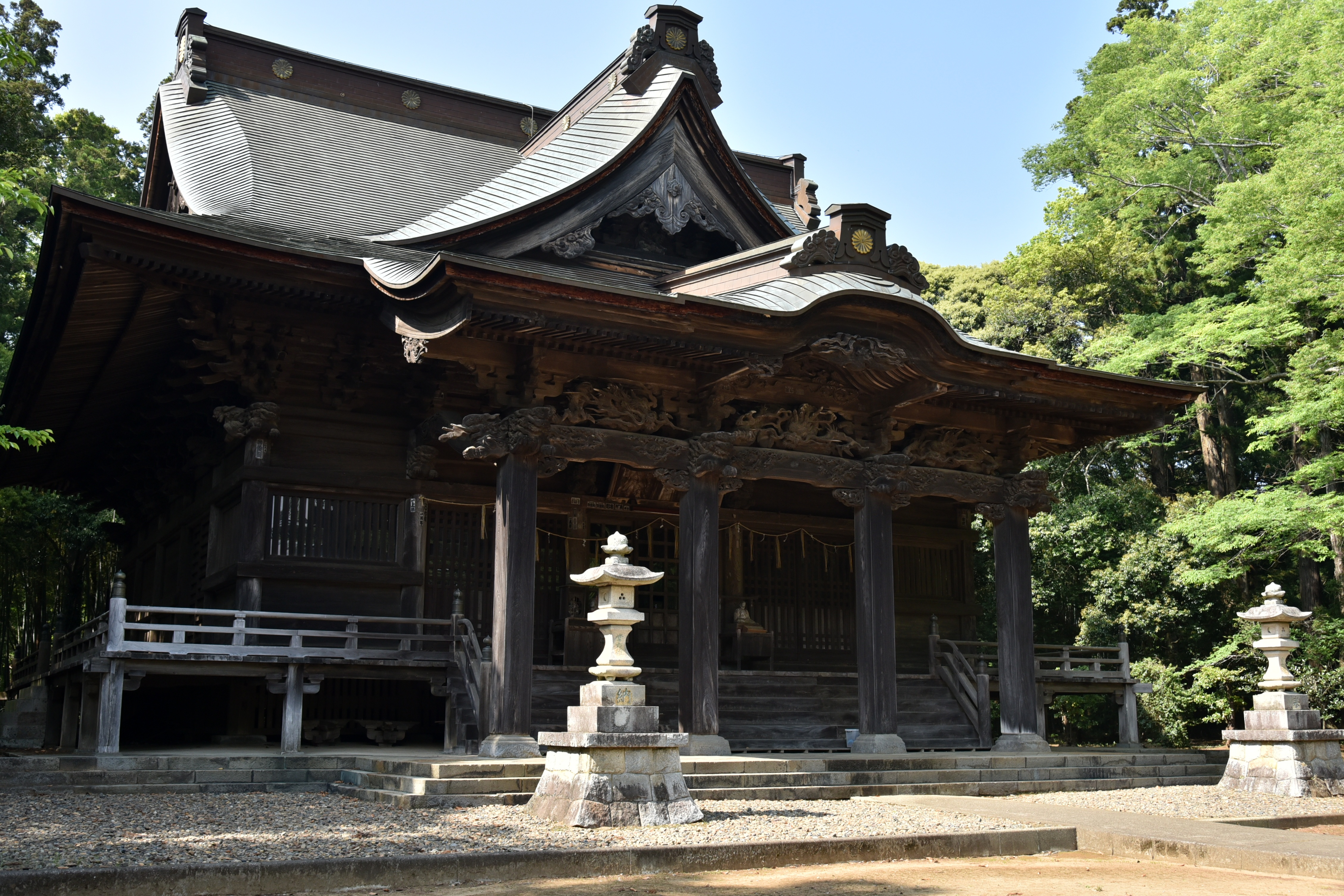
Hōzenji Temple, 318 Ono (小野).

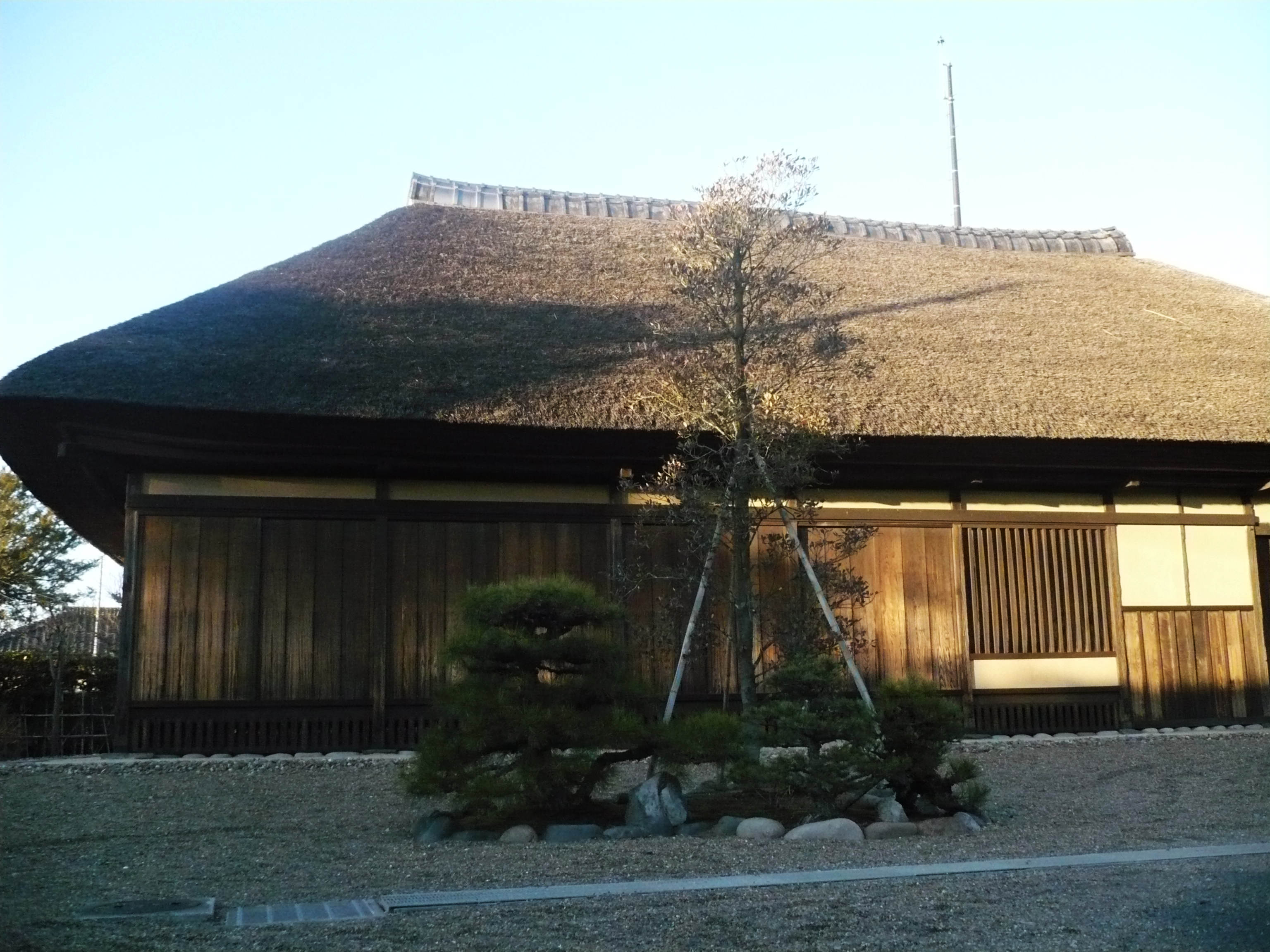
Ibaraki's oldest cottage, 155 Shibasaki (柴崎) – Hirai family residence.

Shintone (新利根町, Shintone-machi) was a Japanese town in Inashiki District, Ibaraki Prefecture]].

== Population ==
As of 2003, the town had an estimated population of 10,434 and a population density of 350.84 persons per km². The total area was 29.74 km².

== Geography ==
Shintone was located in southern Ibaraki Prefecture.

Crossed from west to east by the Shintone River (新利根川). The Ono River (小野川) was on the northern border and Hachiku River (破竹川) on the southwest border.

Its adjacent municipalities were Ryūgasaki City, Edosaki Town, Azuma Town and Kawachi Town.

== History ==
April 1, 1955, Nemoto Village, Shibasaki Village, and Ōta Village merged to form Shintone Village.

April 1, 1982, Japan National Route 408 is enacted.

June 1, 1996, the town system is enforced and becomes Shintone Town.

March 22, 2005, Shintone, along with the towns of Azuma and Edosaki, and the village of Sakuragawa (all from Inashiki District), was merged to create the city of Inashiki and no longer exists as an independent municipality.

The address of the town hall was 〒300–1412, Shintone-machi, 7427 Shibasaki.

In 2018 the dismantling process of the former Shintone Town Hall and other facilities began.

== Road ==
National highways: Japan National Route 408.

Main local road: Ibaraki Prefectural Road 5 and Ibaraki Prefectural Road 49.

== Historic sites and recreation places ==
- Hōzenji Temple and Forest (逢善寺と森)
- Hirai family residence (平井家住宅)
- Dōmae Nature Park – On a bank of the Shintone River (堂前自然公園)
- Shintone Sports Park – Sport center and baseball (新利根総合運動公園)
- Shintone Community Center (新利根公民館)
