= Japan Racing Association =

Horse racing organization in Japan

- 日本中央競馬会

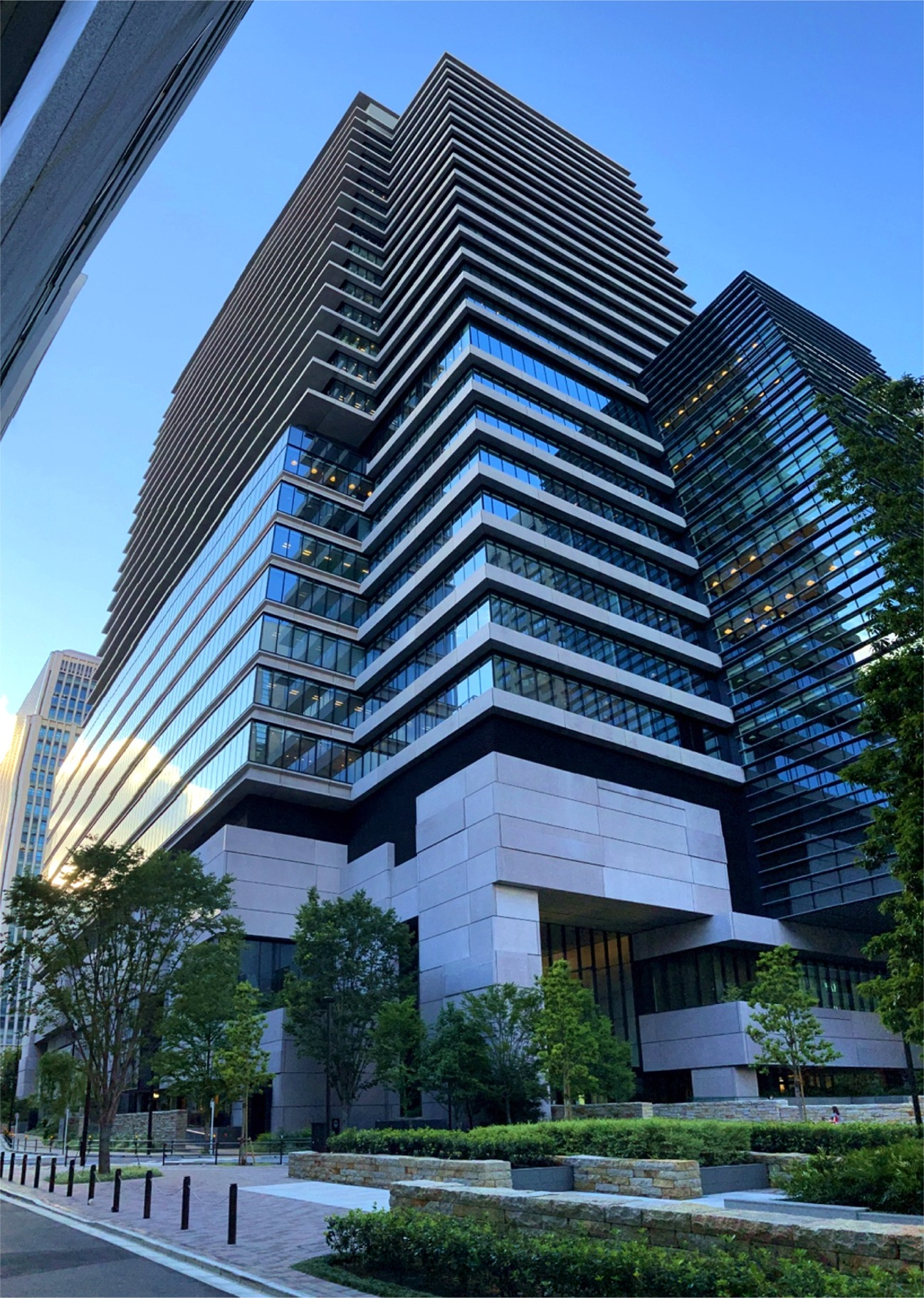
- Hibiya Fort Tower, the location of the JRA Headquarter
- Abbreviation: JRA
- Established: September 16, 1954; 72 years ago
- Type: Public company
- Headquarters: Hibiya Fort Tower; 1–1–1 Nishishimbashi; Minato-ku, Tokyo; 105-0003 Japan
- Location: Japan
- Official language: Japanese
- President and CEO: Masayoshi Yoshida
- Vice-president: Hideaki Yamaguchi
- Senior Executive Director: Masahiro Usuda
- Parent organization: Government of Japan
- Affiliations: Asian Racing Federation (Asia); International Federation of Horseracing Authorities (World)
- Website: jra.jp

The Japan Racing Association (Japanese: 日本中央競馬会 Nippon Chūō Keiba Kai, or JRA) is a public company established in Japan under a law to operate Chūō Keiba (中央競馬 Central horse racing) and to manage racecourses, betting facilities, and horse-training facilities in the country.

It was founded in 1954, according to the Horse Racing Law (競馬法 Keiba Hō) and the Japan Racing Association Law (日本中央競馬会法 Nippon Chūō Keiba Kai Hō) and is operated under the strict oversight of the Ministry of Agriculture, Forestry and Fisheries (Japan).

== Facilities ==
- Racecourses (競馬場 Keiba Jō) – All racecourses in Japan have one oval dirt course inside and one or two turf courses outside. Some also have jump courses. Only three (Tokyo, Niigata and Chukyo) are left-handed (counter-clockwise) and the others are right-handed (clockwise).
  - Tokyo Racecourse (Fuchu, Tokyo)
  - Nakayama Racecourse (Funabashi, Chiba)
  - Kyoto Racecourse (Kyoto, Kyoto)
  - Hanshin Racecourse (Takarazuka, Hyogo)
  - Sapporo Racecourse (Sapporo, Hokkaido)
  - Hakodate Racecourse (Hakodate, Hokkaido)
  - Fukushima Racecourse (Fukushima, Fukushima)
  - Niigata Racecourse (Niigata, Niigata)
  - Chukyo Racecourse (Toyoake, Aichi)
  - Kokura Racecourse (Kitakyushu, Fukuoka)
- Off course betting facilities "WINS", "Light WINS" and "EXCEL" (about 40 locations around the country).The race course without racing will be an off course betting facilities named "Park WINS".
  - Admission fee is collected at the racecourses where the race is held, but not at "Park WINS" where the race is not held. However, reserved seats are charged.
  - "WINS" and "Light WINS" can be entered by anyone over the age of 20 who can purchase betting tickets, but "Excel" is not admitted until the membership registration is completed.
  - Some "WINS" have an "EXCEL Floor" with reserved seats. This is not a membership system, but an admission fee is required.
  - "Light WINS" is a facility that reduces running costs and initial costs, so the facility is small. There is no display to show the race broadcast or get various information.
  - There is also an off course betting facilities operated by racecourses belonging to the National Association of Racing, but betting tickets for Japan Racing Association may also be sold here.
- Training Centers
  - Miho Training Center (Miho, Ibaraki)
  - Ritto Training Center (Ritto, Shiga)
- Horseracing School (Shiroi, Chiba)
- Equine Research Institute (Utsunomiya, Tochigi)
- Equestrian Park (Setagaya, Tokyo)
- Hidaka Yearling Training Farm (Urakawa, Hokkaido)
- Miyazaki Yearling Training Farm (Miyazaki, Miyazaki)
- Gate J. (promotion centers, Shimbashi, Minato, Tokyo and Umeda, Osaka, Osaka)

== Grade I Races ==
=== Two-year-olds ===
- The Hanshin Juvenile Fillies (阪神ジュベナイルフィリーズ), Hanshin, Turf 1600m (for Fillies)
- The Asahi Hai Futurity Stakes (朝日杯フューチュリティステークス), Hanshin, Turf 1600m (for Colts and Fillies)
- The Hopeful Stakes (ホープフルステークス), Nakayama, Turf 2000m (for Colts and Fillies)

=== Three-year-olds ===
- The Oka Sho (桜花賞, "The Japanese 1000 Guineas"), Hanshin, Turf 1600m (for Fillies)
- The Satsuki Shō (皐月賞, "The Japanese 2000 Guineas"), Nakayama, Turf 2000m (for Colts and Fillies)
- The NHK Mile Cup, Tokyo, Turf 1600m (for Colts and Fillies)
- The Yushun Himba (優駿牝馬, "The Japanese Oaks"), Tokyo, Turf 2400m (for Fillies)
- The Tōkyō Yūshun (東京優駿, "The Japanese Derby"), Tokyo, Turf 2400m (for Colts and Fillies)
- The Shūka Sho (秋華賞, Triple Tiara Final Round), Kyoto, Turf 2000m (for Fillies)
- The Kikuka-shō (菊花賞, "The Japanese St. Leger"), Kyoto, Turf 3000m (for Colts and Fillies)

=== Three (or Four) -year-olds and up ===
==== Turf 1600m or less ====
- The Takamatsunomiya Kinen (高松宮記念), Chukyo, Turf 1200m
- The Victoria Mile, Tokyo, Turf 1600m (for Fillies and Mares)
- The Yasuda Kinen (安田記念), Tokyo, Turf 1600m
- The Sprinters Stakes (Global Sprint Challenge Round 8 of 10), Nakayama, Turf 1200m
- The Mile Championship, Kyoto, Turf 1600m

==== Turf 1800m and over ====
- The Ōsaka Hai (大阪杯), Hanshin, Turf 2000m
- The Tennō Shō (Spring) (天皇賞・春, the Emperor's Cup), Kyoto, Turf 3200m
- The Takarazuka Kinen (宝塚記念), Hanshin, Turf 2200m
- The Tennō Shō (Autumn) (天皇賞・秋, the Emperor's Cup), Tokyo, Turf 2000m
- The Queen Elizabeth II Cup (renamed from the Q. E. II Commemorative Cup), Kyoto, Turf 2200m (for Fillies and Mares)
- The Japan Cup (International Invitational), Tokyo, Turf 2400m
- The Arima Kinen (有馬記念, "The (Nakayama) Grand Prix"), Nakayama, Turf 2500m

==== Dirt course ====
- The February Stakes, Tokyo, Dirt 1600m
- The Champions Cup (renamed from the Japan Cup Dirt), Chukyo, Dirt 1800m

==== Steeple-chase (J. GI) ====
- The Nakayama Grand Jump, Nakayama, Turf 4250m
- The Nakayama Daishogai, Nakayama, Turf 4100m

== See also ==
- National Association of Racing (NAR) – Other horse racing organization in Japan
- Japan Bloodhorse Breeders' Association (JBBA) – Thoroughbred breeder organization in Japan
