= Ami, Ibaraki =

Ami 阿見町
- Town
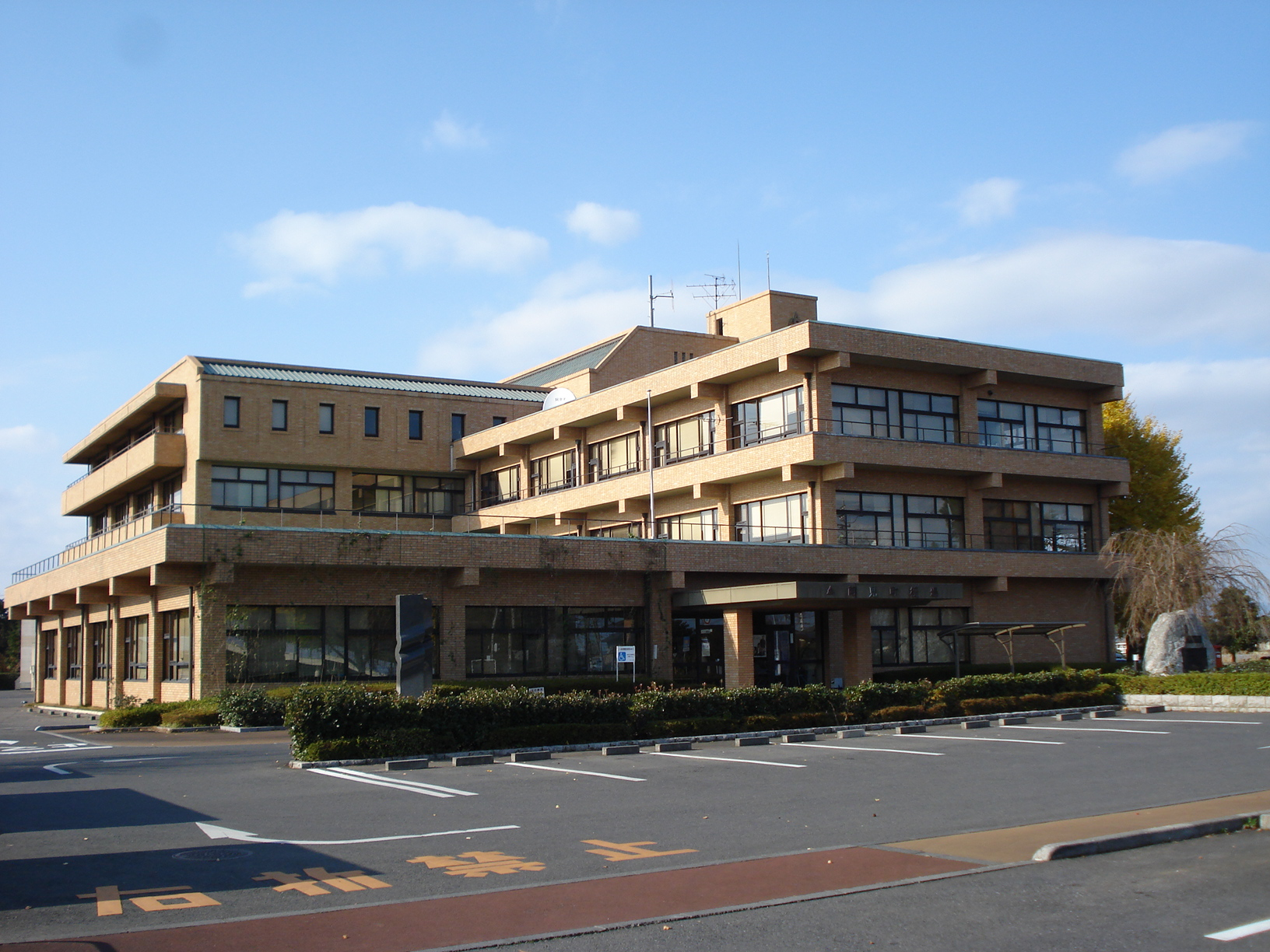
- Ami town office

- Flag Seal

- Location of Ami in Ibaraki Prefecture

- Coordinates: 36°1′50.9″N 140°12′53.4″E
- Country: Japan
- Region: Kantō
- Prefecture: Ibaraki
- District: Inashiki

Area
  - Total: 71.40 km^{2} (27.57 sq mi)

Population (October 2020)
  - Total: 47,927
  - Density: 671.2/km^{2} (1,739/sq mi)
- Time zone: UTC+9 (Japan Standard Time)
- Tree: Sakura
- Flower: Chrysanthemum
- Bird: Japanese bush warbler
- Phone number: 0296-48-1111
- Address: 1-1-1 Chuo, Ami-machi, Inashiki-gun, Ibaraki-ken 300-0332
- Website: Official website

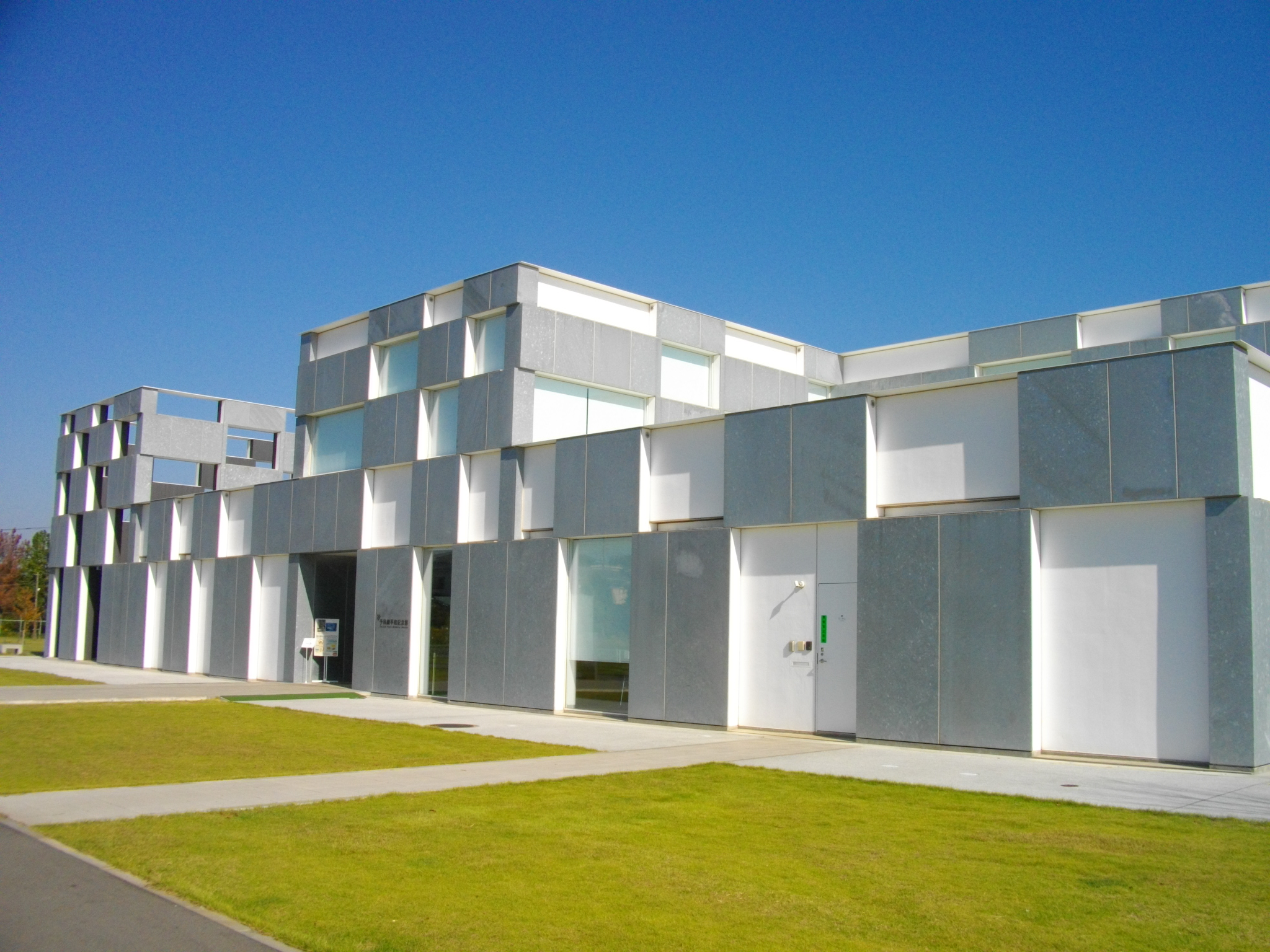
Yokaren Peace Memorial Museum

Ami (阿見町, Ami-machi) is a town located in Ibaraki Prefecture, Japan. As of 1 October 2020, the town had an estimated population of 47,927 in 20,279 households and a population density of 671 persons per km^{2}. The percentage of the population aged over 65 was 28.3%. The total area of the town is 71.40 square kilometres (27.57 sq mi).

== Geography ==
Located in southern Ibaraki Prefecture, Ami is bordered to the north by Lake Kasumigaura

=== Surrounding municipalities ===
Ibaraki Prefecture

- Inashiki
- Miho
- Tsuchiura
- Ushiku

=== Climate ===
Ami has a Humid continental climate (Köppen Cfa) characterized by warm summers and cool winters with light snowfall. The average annual temperature in Ami is 13.8 °C. The average annual rainfall is 1306 mm with September as the wettest month. The temperatures are highest on average in August, at around 25.7 °C, and lowest in January, at around 2.8 °C.

== Demographics ==
Per Japanese census data, the population of Ami has recently plateaued after a long period of growth.

Historical population
Year	Pop.	±%
1950	20,859	—
1960	22,326	+7.0%
1970	24,904	+11.5%
1980	33,720	+35.4%
1990	42,192	+25.1%
2000	46,922	+11.2%
2010	47,940	+2.2%
2020	48,553	+1.3%

== History ==
During the Edo period, the area around Ami was part of Hitachi Province. The villages of Ami, Kimihara, Asahi and Funashima were created with the establishment of the modern municipalities system on April 1, 1889. In 1921, the Imperial Japanese Navy established Kasumigaura Air Field, a naval aviation training base at Ami, with floatplane operations on nearby Kasumigaura. Zeppelin operations also began from 1929. In 1937, the Youth Aviation Squadron was transferred from Yokosuka. The base was repeatedly bombed in 1944 and 1945 during World War II, with the attack on June 10, 1945, killing over 300 people.

On April 1, 1955, the villages of Ami, Kimihara and Asahi merged to form the town of Ami. Most of the village of Funashima joined on April 20, 1955.

== Government ==
Ami has a mayor-council form of government with a directly elected mayor and a unicameral town council of 18 members. Ami contributes one member to the Ibaraki Prefectural Assembly. In terms of national politics, the town is part of Ibaraki 6th district of the lower house of the Diet of Japan.

== Economy ==
Ami has a mixed economy. Agriculture remains predominant; however, there are also numerous factories for chemicals, light manufacturing and electronics. The Japanese Ground Self-Defense Force also has a number of military installations in the town.

== Education ==
- Ibaraki University – Department of Agriculture
- Ibaraki Prefectural University of Health Sciences
- Ami has seven public elementary schools and four public middle schools operated by the town government, and one public high school operated by the Ibaraki Prefectural Board of Education.

== Transportation ==
=== Railway ===
- Ami does not have any passenger rail service. The nearest stations are Tsuchiura and Arakawaoki in neighboring Tsuchiura.

=== Highway ===
- Ken-Ō Expressway – Ushiku-Ami Interchange, Ami-Higashi Interchange
- National Route 125

== Military facilities ==
- JGSDF Camp Kasumigaura
- JGSDF Camp Tutiura
- JGSDF Ordnance School

== Local attractions ==
- Ami Premium Outlet Shopping Center
- Site of Jojo Castle
- Yokaren Peace Memorial Museum

== International relations ==
- (United States) – Superior, WI, USA – sister city since 1997
- – Liuzhou, Guangxi Zhuang Autonomous Region, China (friendship city) from June 1997
