= Eijiro Ai =

Japanese baseball player (born 1964)

- Pitcher
- Born: September 29, 1964 (age 61); Inashiki District, Ibaraki, Japan
- Bats: Right Throws: Right

Teams
- As player: Yakult Swallows (1985–1989); Lotte Orions/Chiba Lotte Marines (1991–1992); As coach: Hokkaido Nippon-Ham Fighters (2013–2015)

Eijiro Ai (阿井英二郎, Ai Eijiro; born September 29, 1964) is a Japanese former Nippon Professional Baseball pitcher. He played for the Yakult Swallows from 1985 to 1989, and the Lotte Orions/Chiba Lotte Marines in 1991 and 1992.
