= Kōzaki =

Kōzaki 神崎町
- Town
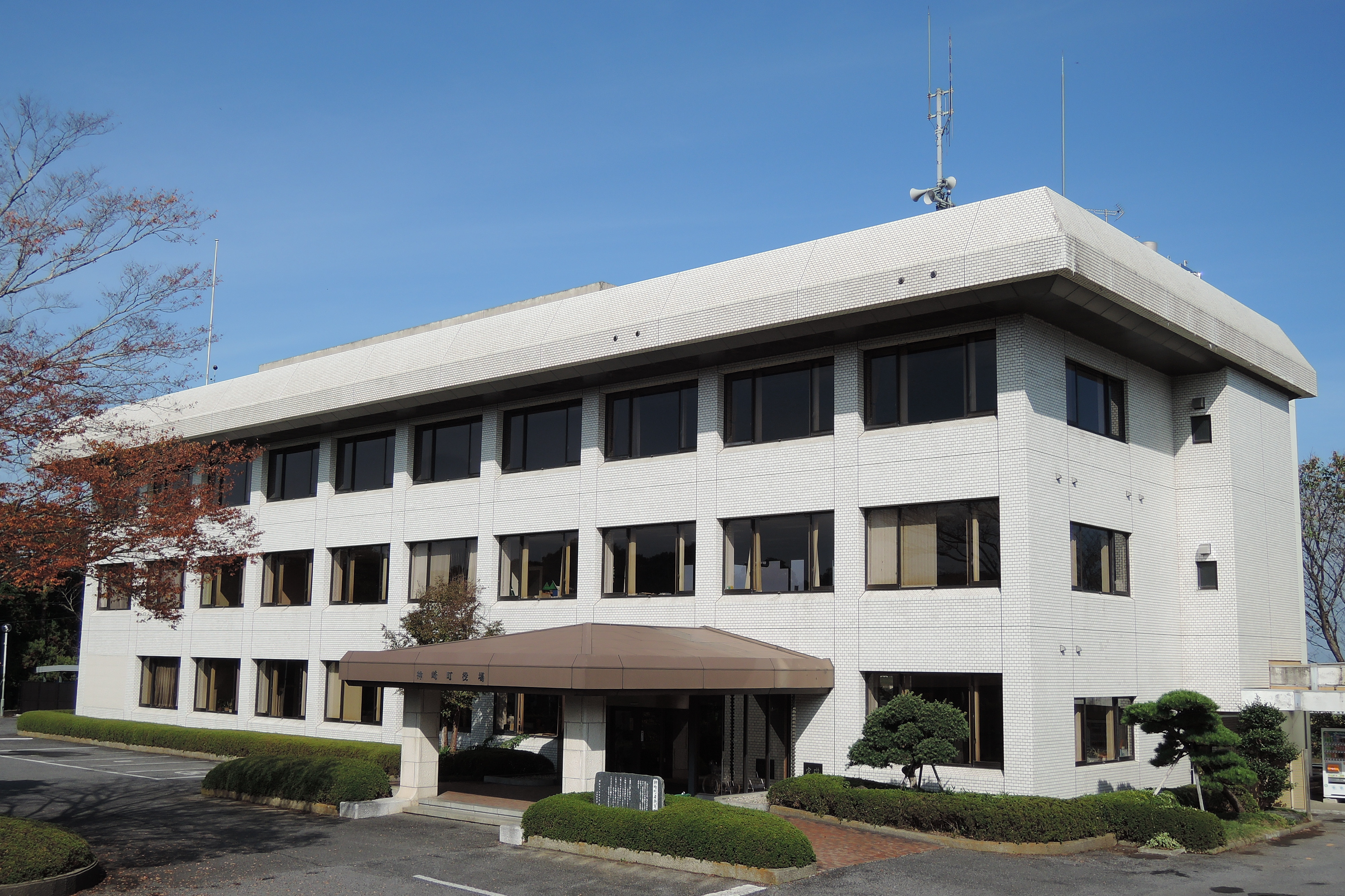
- Kōzaki Town Hall

- Flag Seal

- Location of Kōzaki in Chiba Prefecture

- Coordinates: 35°54′N 140°24′E
- Country: Japan
- Region: Kantō
- Prefecture: Chiba
- District: Katori

Area
  - Total: 19.85 km^{2} (7.66 sq mi)

Population (December 1, 2020)
  - Total: 5,884
  - Density: 296.4/km^{2} (767.7/sq mi)
- Time zone: UTC+9 (Japan Standard Time)
- City symbols
  - Tree: Cinnamomum camphora
  - Flower: Rose
  - Bird: Japanese white-eye
- Phone number: 0478(72)2111
- Address: 163 Honjuku. Katori-gun, Kōzaki-machi, Chiba-ken 289-0292
- Website: Official website

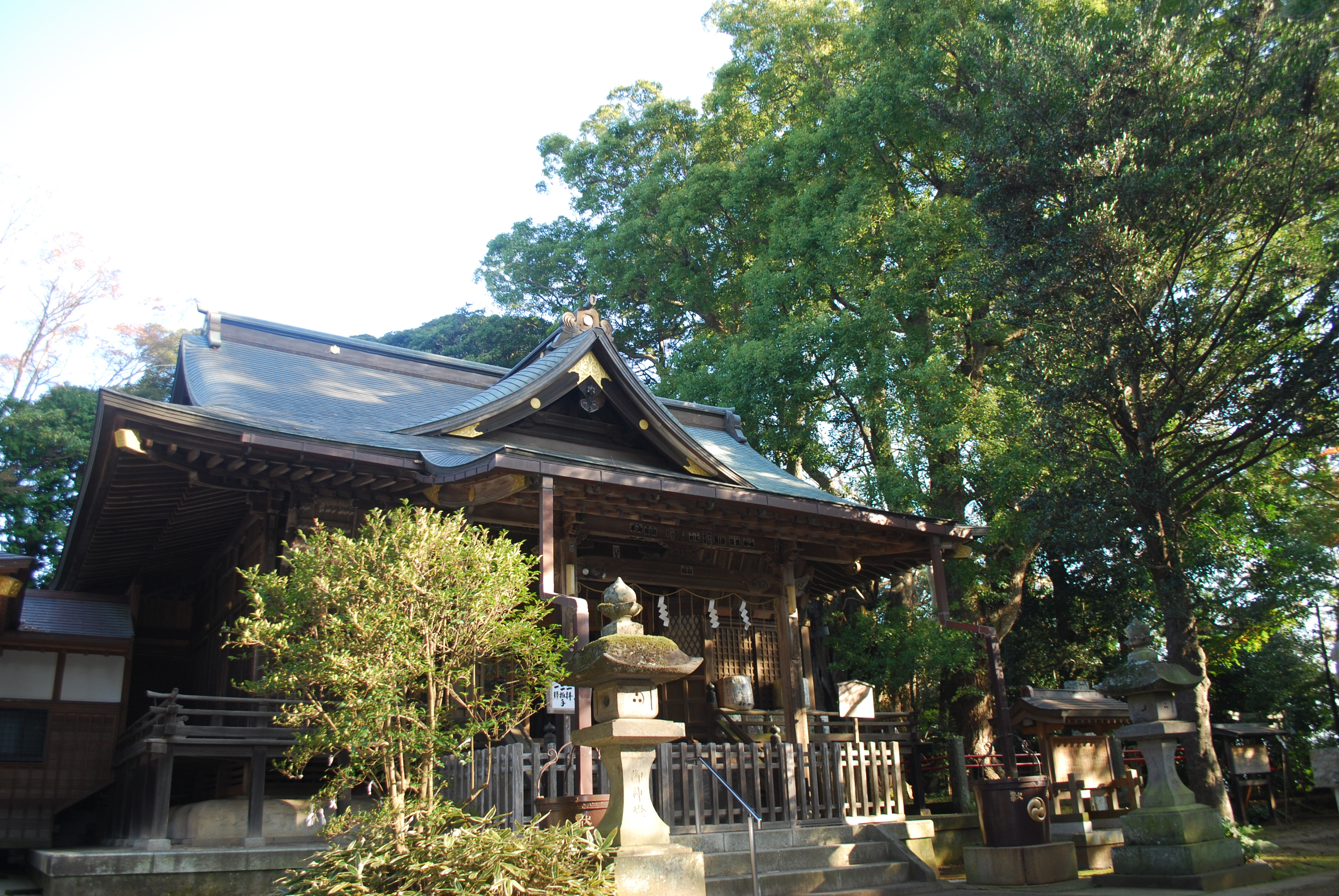
Kozaki Shrine

Kōzaki (神崎町, Kōzaki-machi) is a town located in Chiba Prefecture, Japan.As of 1 December 2020, the town had an estimated population of 5,884 in 2471 households and a population density of 300 persons per km². The total area of the town is 19.85 square kilometres (7.66 mi^{2}).

== Etymology ==
The name of the town of Kōzaki in the Japanese language is formed from two kanji characters. The first, 神, means kami, the Japanese term for god, spirit, or a natural force; and the second, 崎 means "cape" or "small peninsula".

== Geography ==
Kōzaki is located in far northern Chiba Prefecture, approximately 40 kilometers from then prefectural capital at Chiba and 60 to 70 kilometers from central Tokyo. The town faces the Tone River to the north, and sits on the lowlands of the river to the north and the Shimōsa Plateau to the south. Kōzaki is part of Ōtone Prefectural Natural Park.

=== Neighboring municipalities ===
Chiba Prefecture

- Katori
- Narita

Ibaraki Prefecture

- Inashiki
- Kawachi

=== Climate ===
Kōzaki has a humid subtropical climate (Köppen Cfa) characterized by warm summers and cool winters with light to no snowfall. The average annual temperature in Kōzaki is 14.5 °C. The average annual rainfall is 1414 mm with September as the wettest month. The temperatures are highest on average in August, at around 26.0 °C, and lowest in January, at around 4.0 °C.

== Demographics ==
Per Japanese census data, the population of Kōzaki has remained relatively steady over the past 70 years.

Historical population
Year	Pop.	±%
1920	4,759	—
1930	4,981	+4.7%
1940	4,949	−0.6%
1950	6,387	+29.1%
1960	5,857	−8.3%
1970	5,381	−8.1%
1980	5,645	+4.9%
1990	5,620	−0.4%
2000	6,747	+20.1%
2010	6,454	−4.3%
2020	5,816	−9.9%

== History ==
Kōzaki was historically part of Shimōsa Province until the formation of Chiba Prefecture at the beginning of the Meiji Period (1868 – 1912). Kōzaki and Yonezawa villages were founded on April 1, 1889 within Katori District of Chiba Prefecture with the creation the modern municipalities system. Kōzaki was elevated to town status on March 12, 1890. On January 5, 1955, Yonezawa merged into the town of Kōzaki.

== Government ==
Kōzaki has a mayor-council form of government with a directly elected mayor and a unicameral town council of 13 members. Kōzaki, together with the city of Katori and town of Tako, contributes two members to the Chiba Prefectural Assembly. In terms of national politics, the town is part of Chiba 10th district of the lower house of the Diet of Japan.

== Economy ==
Kōzaki is a regional commercial center with some light manufacturing industries. Some 28% of the workforce commutes to the city of Narita per the 2010 census.

== Education ==
Kōzaki has two public elementary schools and one public middle school operated by the town government. The town does not have a public high school; however, the Chiba Prefectural Board of Education operates one special education school for the handicapped.

== Transportation ==
=== Railway ===
JR East – Narita Line

- Shimōsa-Kōzaki

=== Highway ===
- Ken-Ō Expressway – Kōzaki Interchange
- National Route 356
