= Inashiki =

Inashiki 稲敷市
- City
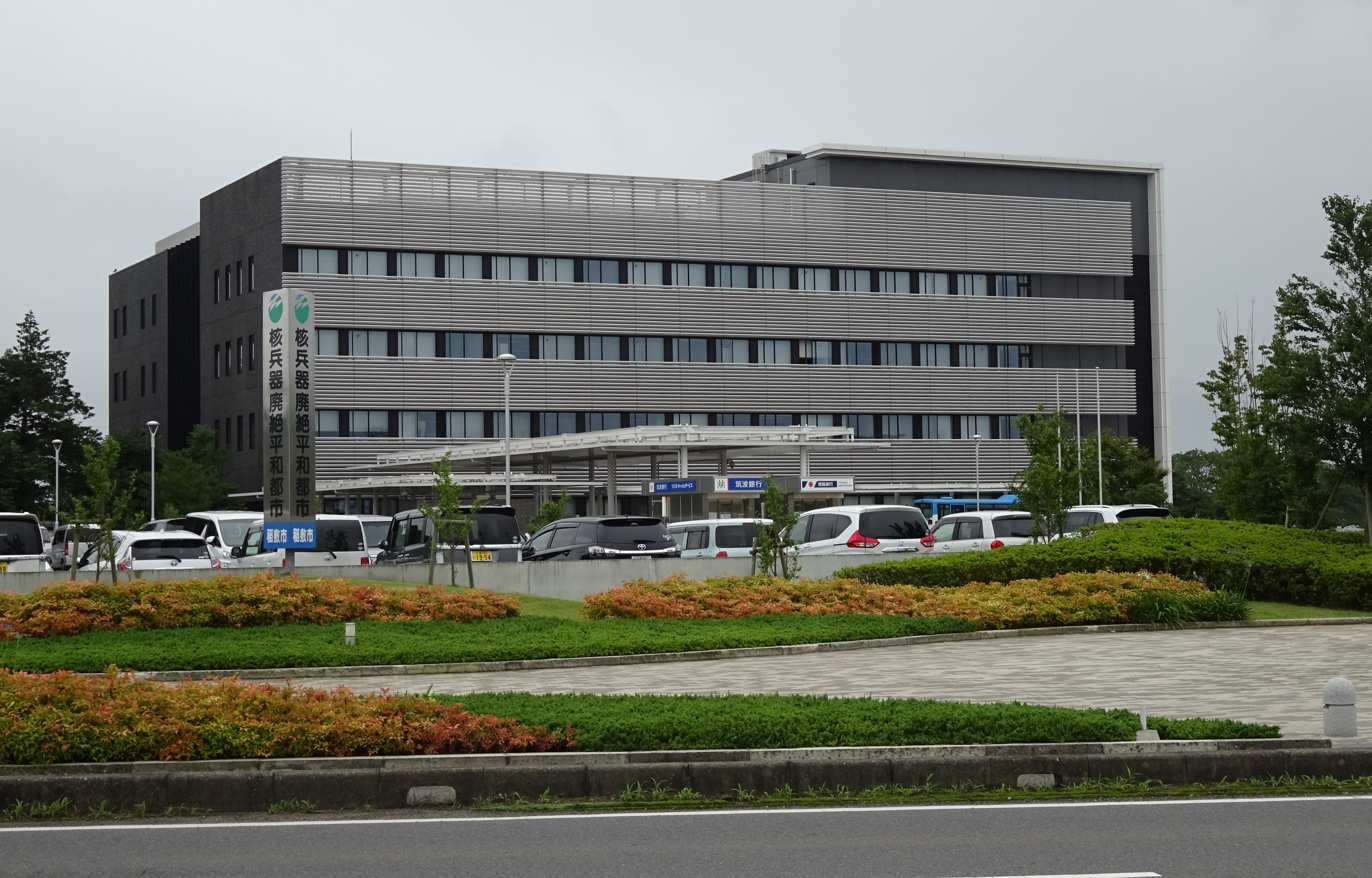
- Inashiki Central City Hall

- Flag Seal

- Location of Inashiki in Ibaraki Prefecture

- Coordinates: 35°57′23.52″N 140°19′26.2″E
- Country: Japan
- Region: Kantō
- Prefecture: Ibaraki

Area
  - Total: 205.81 km^{2} (79.46 sq mi)

Population (November 1, 2021)
  - Total: 38,353
  - Density: 186.35/km^{2} (482.65/sq mi)
- Time zone: UTC+9 (Japan Standard Time)
- Tree: Sakura
- Flower: Chrysanthemum
- Bird: Japanese bush warbler
- Phone number: 029-892-2000
- Address: 1570-1 Inuzuka, Inashiki-shi, Ibaraki-ken 〒300-0507
- Website: Official website

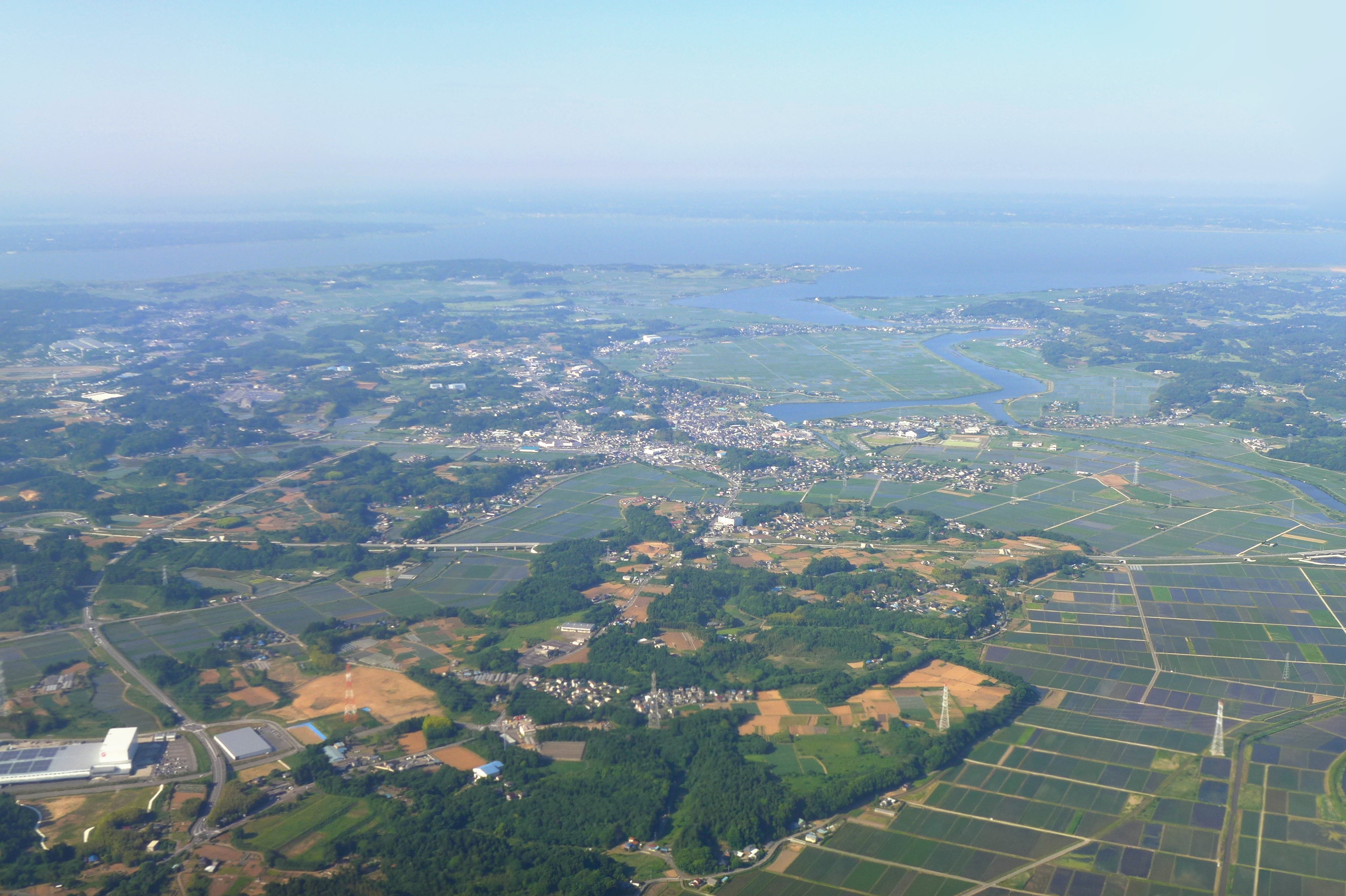
Inashiki

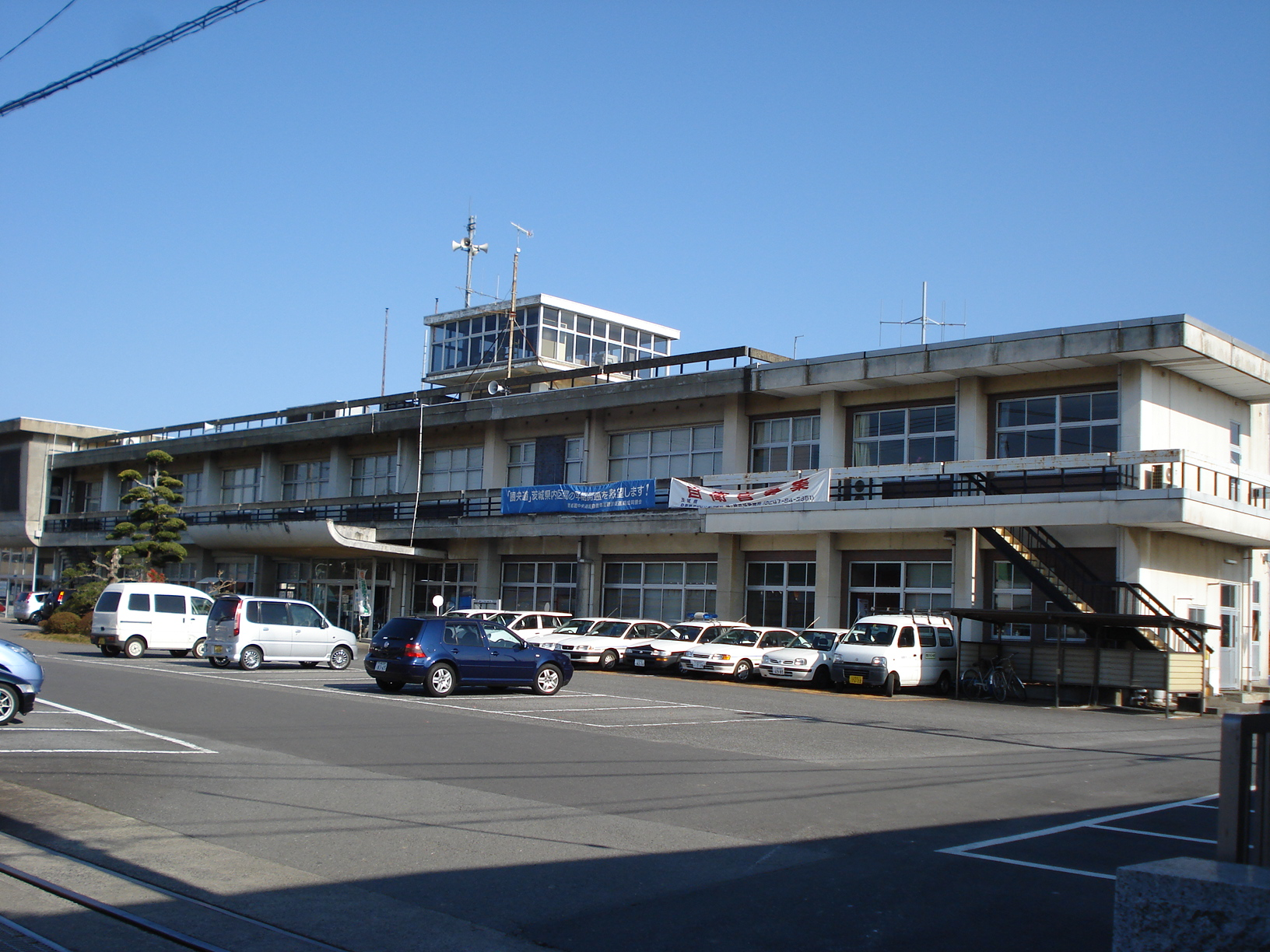
Old city hall of Edosaki Town and Inashiki City

Inashiki (稲敷市, Inashiki-shi; Japanese pronunciation: [ì.nä́.ɕi̥.k̟ʲì, -k̟ʲí.ɕì]) is a city located in Ibaraki Prefecture, Japan. As of 1 July 2020, the city had an estimated population of 39,127 in 14,733 households and a population density of 191 persons per km^{2}. The percentage of the population aged over 65 was 37.1%. The total area of the city is 205.81 square kilometres (79.46 sq mi).

== Geography ==
Inashiki is located in southern Ibaraki Prefecture, bordered by Lake Kasumigaura to the north and Chiba Prefecture to the south. It is approximately 70 kilometers northeast of Tokyo.

=== Rivers ===
The city is crossed by Ono River (小野川) and Shintone River (新利根川), which flow into the Kasumigaura. It is borderered by the Hachiku River (破竹川) on the southwest, Tone River (利根川) on the southeast, and Yokotone River (横利根川) on the east. Hachiku pours its waters into the Shintone River, Yokotone into the Tone River, and the Tone River at the end of its course empties into the Ocean Pacific.

=== Surrounding municipalities ===
Chiba Prefecture

- Katori
- Kōzaki

Ibaraki Prefecture

- Ami
- Itako
- Kawachi
- Miho
- Ryūgasaki

=== Climate ===
Inashiki has a humid subtropical climate (Köppen Cfa) characterized by warm summers and cool winters with light snowfall. The average annual temperature in Inashiki is 14.3 °C. The average annual rainfall is 1360 mm with September as the wettest month. The temperatures are highest on average in August, at around 26.0 °C, and lowest in January, at around 3.6 °C.

== Demographics ==
Per Japanese census data, the population of Inashiki peaked around the year 2000 and has declined since.

Historical population
Year	Pop.	±%
1920	34,217	—
1930	36,096	+5.5%
1940	38,246	+6.0%
1950	47,081	+23.1%
1960	45,527	−3.3%
1970	41,443	−9.0%
1980	43,257	+4.4%
1990	45,326	+4.8%
2000	51,284	+13.1%
2010	46,895	−8.6%
2020	39,039	−16.8%

== History ==
The city of Inashiki was established on March 22, 2005, from the merger of the towns of Azuma, Edosaki and Shintone, and the village of Sakuragawa (all from Inashiki District).

== Government ==
Inashiki has a mayor-council form of government with a directly elected mayor and a unicameral city council of 20 members. Inashiki, together with neighboring Kawachi, contributes one member to the Ibaraki Prefectural Assembly. In terms of national politics, the city is part of Ibaraki 3rd district of the lower house of the Diet of Japan.

== Economy ==
The economy of Inashiki is primarily agricultural, with rice, broccoli, lotus root, kabocha pumpkins and fig as major cash crops.

Fishery in the Lake Kasumigaura and rivers.

Factories, machining sector and commercial facilities.

== Education ==
Inashiki has ten public elementary schools and four public middle schools operated by the city government, and one public high school operated by the Ibaraki Prefectural Board of Education.

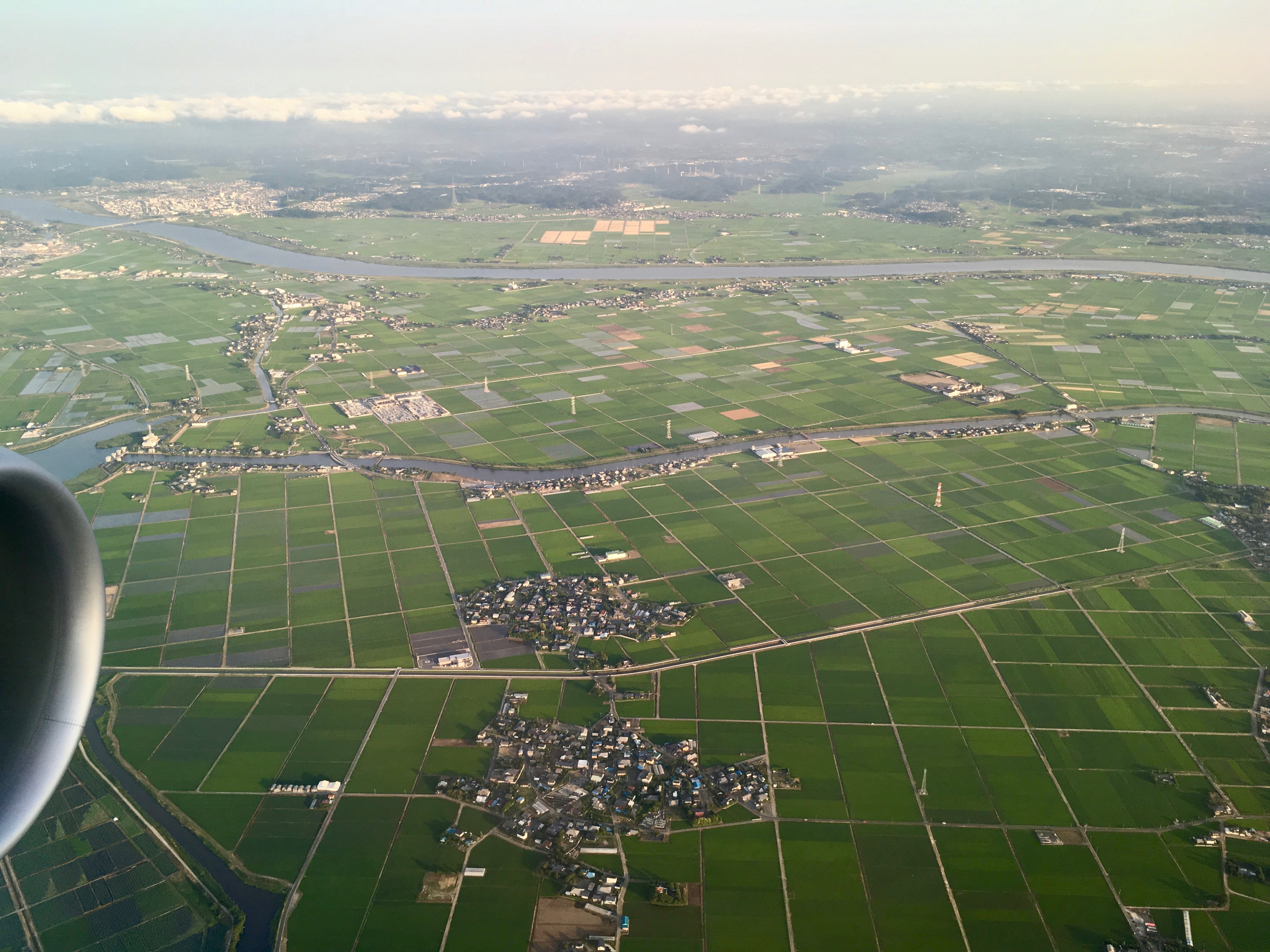
Aerial view of Shintone and Tone rivers, border between Ibaraki and Chiba prefectures

== Transportation ==
=== Railway ===
Inashiki does not have any passenger railway services. Railway services can be accessed via the Joban Line from Tsuchiura Station, Hitachino-Ushiku Station, and Arakawaoki Station. The Jōsō Line through the Ryūgasaki Line from Ryūgasaki Station is another alternative.

=== Airport ===
Inashiki does not have airport services. Narita International Airport is adjacent and located in Narita City of the Chiba Prefecture.

=== Highway ===
- Ken-Ō Expressway – Edosaki Parking Area, Inashiki Interchange, Inashiki-Higashi Interchange
- National Route 51
- National Route 125
- National Route 408
- Prefectural roads, such as Ibaraki Prefectural Routes 2, 5, 11, 25 and 49.

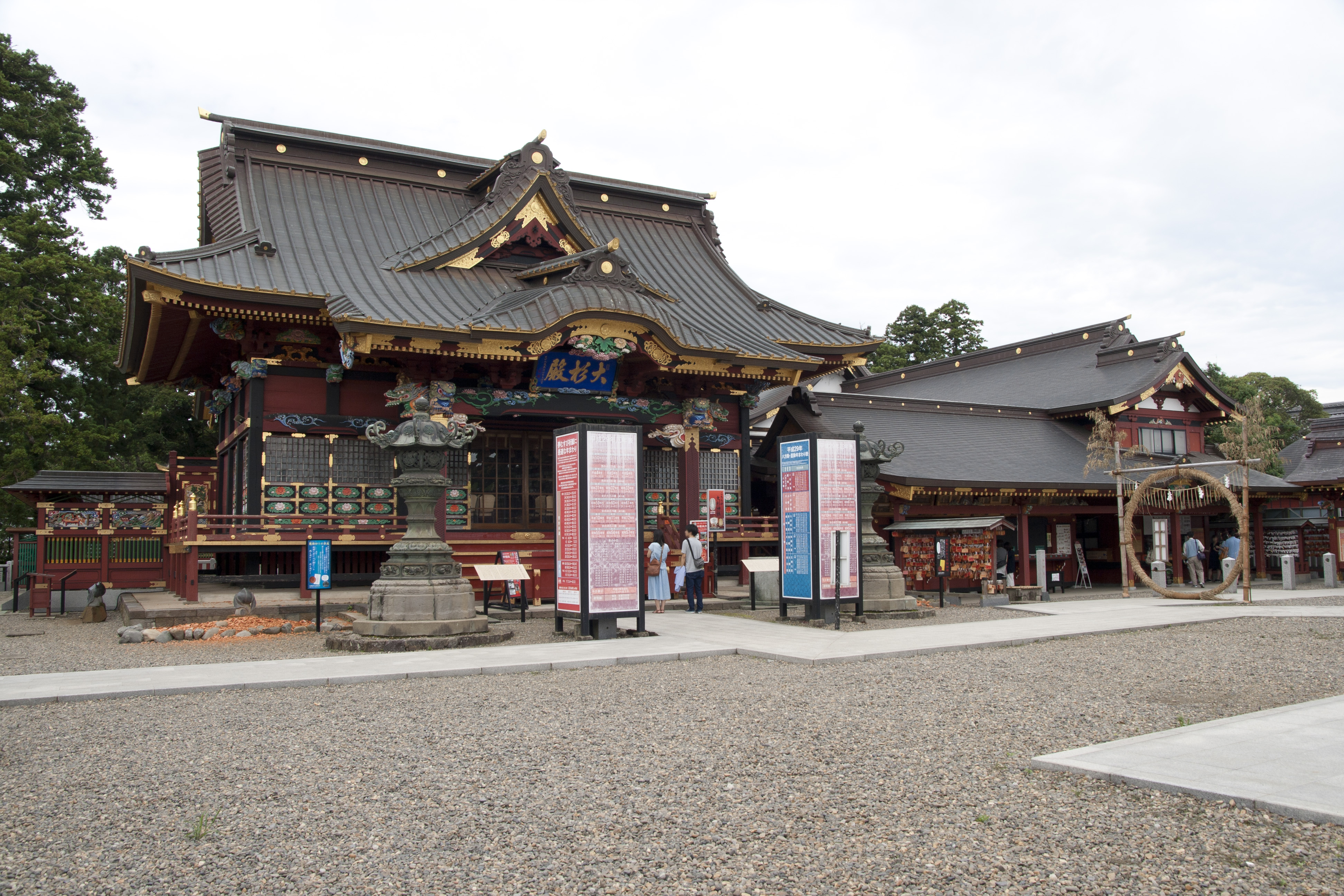
Ōsugi shrine

== Local attractions ==
- Ancient Ōsugi shrine Festival.
- Edosaki Gion Festival.
- Tulip Festival in Wada Park of Ukishima, on the shores of Lake Kasumigaura.

== Sister cities ==
- Salmon Arm, British Columbia, Canada, since February 1990

== Notable people from Inashiki ==
- Tatsuya Kawajiri, mixed martial arts
- Inazuma Raigorō, sumo wrestler
- Shirō Takasu, admiral in the Imperial Japanese Navy
