= Azuma, Ibaraki =

Dissolved municipality in Ibaraki prefecture, Japan

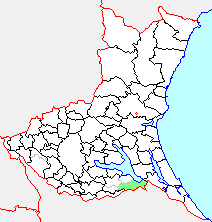
Map of Azuma, Ibaraki

Azuma (東町, Azuma-machi) was a town located in Inashiki District, Ibaraki Prefecture, Japan.

As of 2003, the town had an estimated population of 12,703 and a population density of 206.72 persons per km^{2}. The total area was 61.45 km^{2}.

On March 22, 2005, Azuma, along with the towns of Edosaki and Shintone, and the village of Sakuragawa (all from Inashiki District), was merged to create the city of Inashiki and no longer exists as an independent municipality.
