= Ibaraki Prefectural University of Health Sciences =

Coordinates: 36°1′38.86″N 140°12′37.5″E

- 茨城県立医療大学
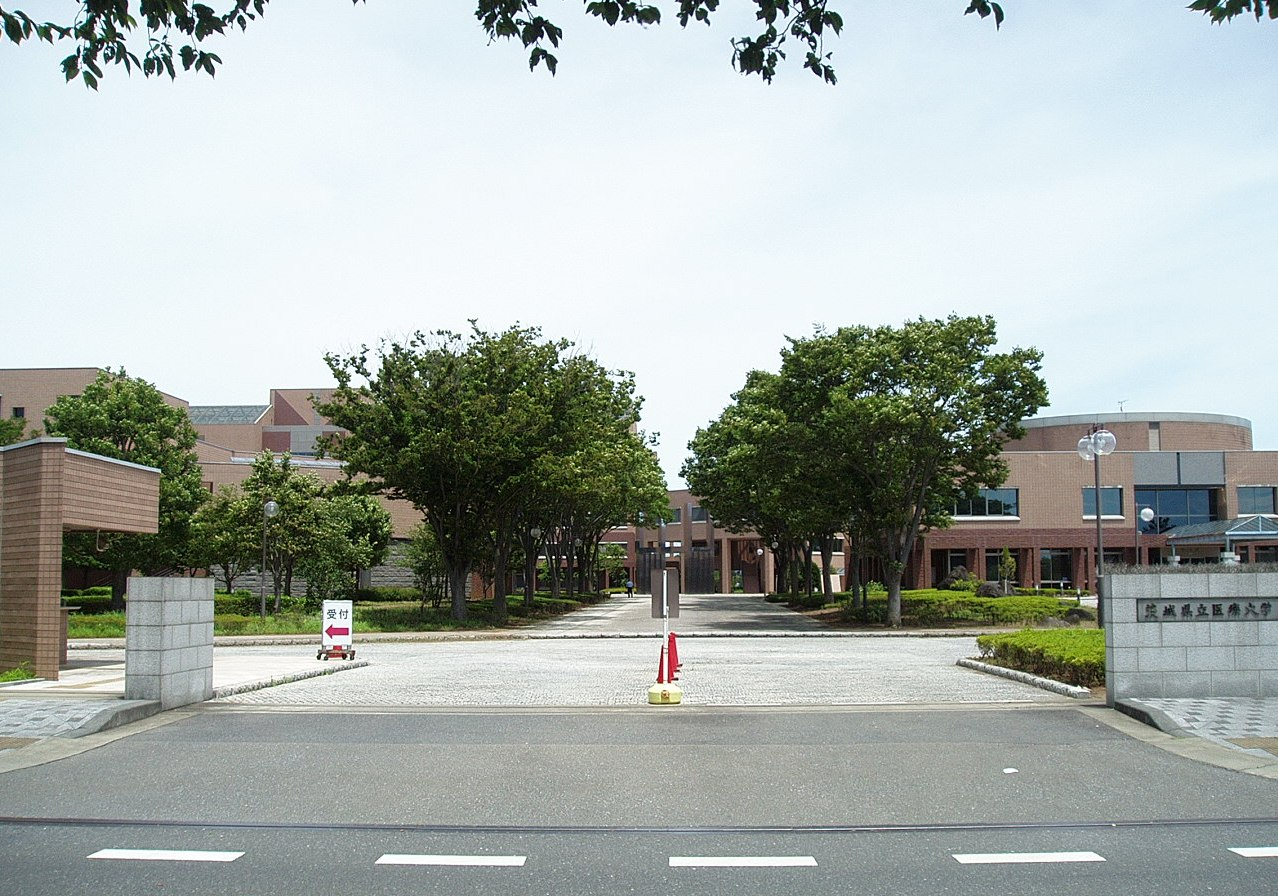
- Type: Public
- Established: 1995
- Location: Ami, Ibaraki, Japan
- Website: Official website

Ibaraki Prefectural University of Health Sciences (茨城県立医療大学, Ibaraki kenritsu iryō daigaku) is a public university in the town of Ami, Ibaraki, Japan. The school was established in 1995.
