= Edosaki =

Town in Ibaraki Prefecture, Japan

Coordinates: 35°57′N 140°19′E

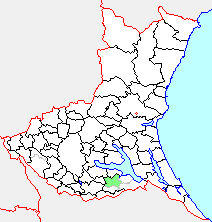
Map of Edosaki, Ibaraki

Edosaki (江戸崎町, Edosaki-machi) was a town located in Inashiki District, Ibaraki Prefecture, Japan.

In 2003, the town had an estimated population of 20,030 and a population density of 379.21 per km^{2}. The total area was 52.82 km^{2}.

On March 22, 2005, Edosaki and the towns of Azuma and Shintone, and the village of Sakuragawa (all from Inashiki District), were merged to create the city of Inashiki and no longer exists as an independent municipality.
