= Sakuragawa (former village) =

Dissolved municipality in Ibaraki prefecture, Japan

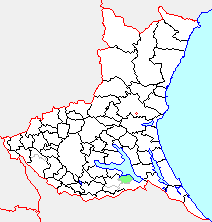
Map of Sakuragawa, Ibaraki

Sakuragawa (桜川村, Sakuragawa-mura) was a village located in Inashiki District, Ibaraki Prefecture, Japan.

As of March 2005, the village had an estimated population of 7,075 and a population density of 207.42 persons per km^{2}. The total area was 34.11 km^{2}.

On March 22, 2005, Sakuragawa, along with the towns of Azuma, Edosaki and Shintone (all from Inashiki District), was merged to create the city of Inashiki and no longer exists as an independent municipality.
