= Ōtone Prefectural Natural Park =

Natural park in Chiba Prefecture, Japan

- 県立大利根自然公園
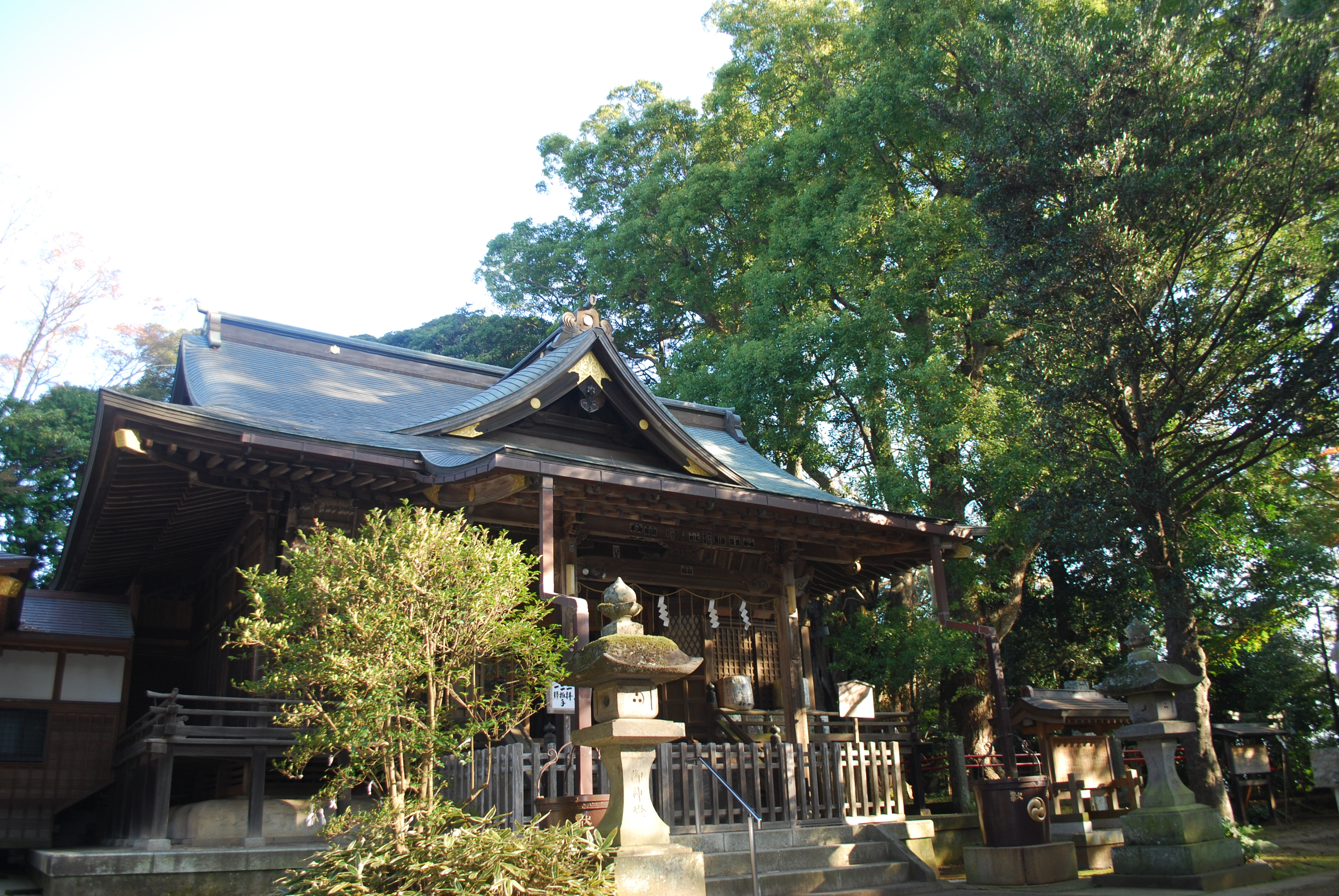
- Kōzaki Jinja
- Interactive map of Ōtone Prefectural Natural Park
- Location: Chiba Prefecture, Japan
- Coordinates: 35°54′59″N 140°30′21″E
- Area: 5.03 km^{2} (1.94 sq mi)
- Established: 5 July 1935

Ōtone Prefectural Natural Park (県立大利根自然公園, Kenritsu Ōtone shizen kōen) is a Prefectural Natural Park in northern Chiba Prefecture, Japan. First designated for protection in 1935, the park's central feature is the Tone River. The park spans the municipalities of Katori and Kōzaki. The giant camphor trees at Kōzaki Jinja (神崎神社) are a Natural Monument.

== See also ==
- National Parks of Japan
