= Ritto Training Center =

Japan Racing Association training facility in Shiga Prefecture, Japan

- 栗東トレーニングセンター
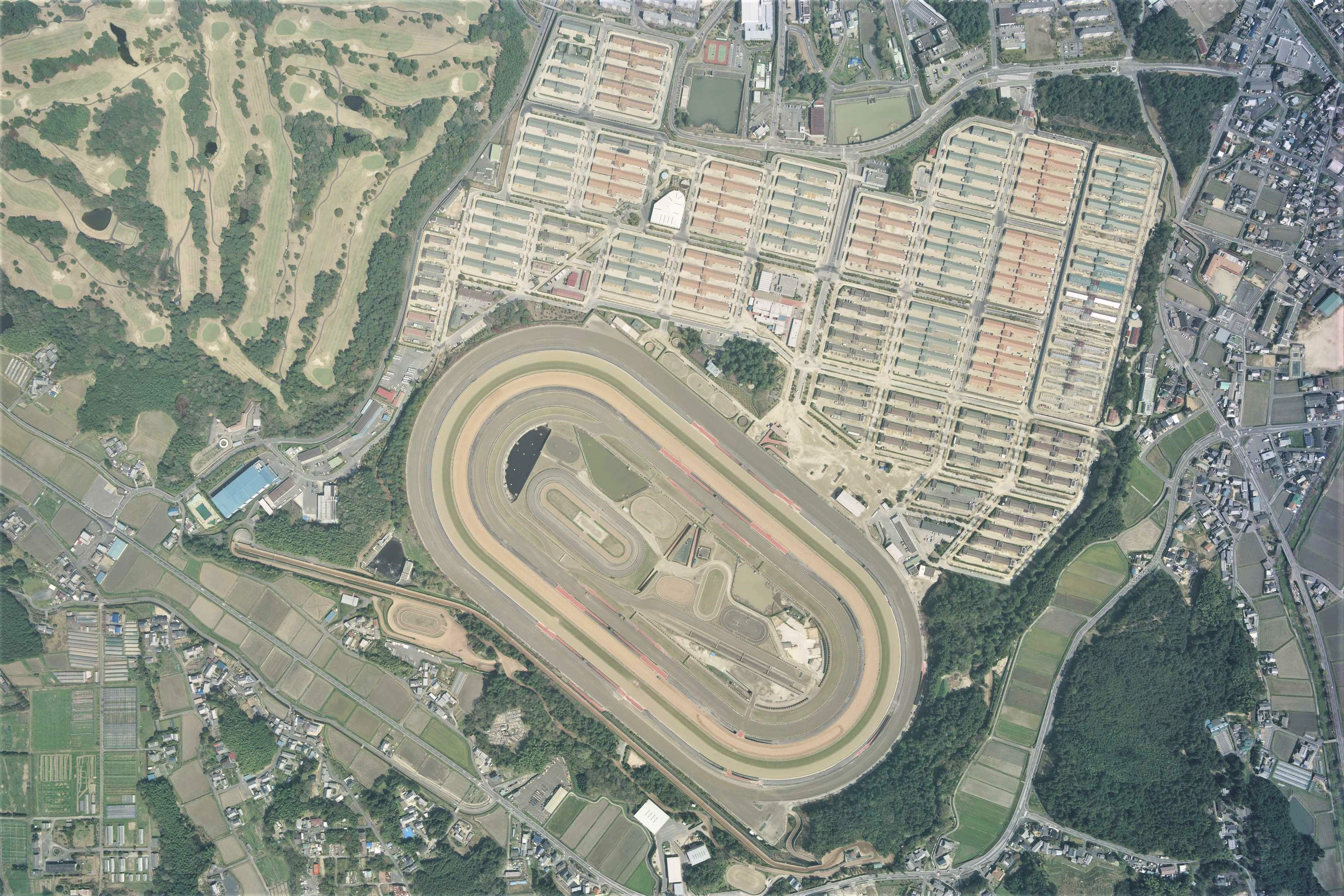
- Aerial view of the Ritto Training Center
- Interactive map of the Ritto Training Center area

General information
- Location: Rittō, Shiga Prefecture, Japan
- Coordinates: 34°59′38.4″N 136°0′57.5″E
- Owner: Japan Racing Association
- Operator: Japan Racing Association

Ritto Training Center (Japanese: 栗東トレーニングセンター, Rittō Torēningu Sentā) is a Japan Racing Association (JRA) facility in Rittō, Shiga Prefecture, Japan. It serves as the primary training base for West Japan (Kansai) racehorses.

== History and facilities ==
The facility opened on 11 November 1969, consolidating stables previously located at Chukyo, Hanshin, and Kyoto. It is a major racehorse training facility in Japan, accommodating over 2,100 horses across multiple tracks, including a 1,800-metre woodchip course, a dirt course, and a 1,085-metre hill road (hanro) completed in 1985.

== Operations ==
Since the late 1980s, horses based at Ritto (Kansai horses) statistically outperformed those based at the Miho Training Center (Kanto horses), a disparity referred to as "west high east low". This dominance is often attributed to the introduction of the hill road and woodchip courses at Ritto, which provided superior training conditions compared to the flat tracks available in the Kanto region at the time. To mitigate this gap, some Miho trainers utilize "Ritto study abroad" (Ritto ryūgaku), transporting horses to Ritto for pre-race training ahead of Kansai-based events.

== Individuals associated with Ritto ==
- Mirco Demuro
- Yuichi Fukunaga
- Kenichi Ikezoe
- Manabu Ikezoe
- Seina Imamura
- Yasunari Iwata
- Yuga Kawada
- Yuichi Kitamura
- Christophe Lemaire
- Mikio Matsunaga
- Kohei Matsuyama
- Ryusei Sakai
- Katsuma Sameshima
- Hirofumi Shii
- Naosuke Sugai
- Haruki Sugiyama
- Katsuhiko Sumii
- Kunihiko Take
- Koshiro Take
- Yutaka Take
- Yasuo Tomomichi
- Ryuji Wada
- Yoshito Yahagi

== Incidents ==
In February 2023, a stable employee was reprimanded after posting a video on social media showing them flicking a horse's nose.

In February 2026, a civilian vehicle mistakenly entered the facility's restricted stable area after a security guard confused a local company pass for a JRA pass. The vehicle drove through the training tracks at speeds exceeding the limit before being stopped by staff; no humans or horses were injured, and the JRA declined to file a police report citing the driver's panic and lack of malicious intent.

== See also ==
- Miho Training Center
