= Ibaraki University =

Japanese national university in Ibaraki Prefecture

Coordinates: 36°24′04″N 140°26′35″E

- 茨城大学
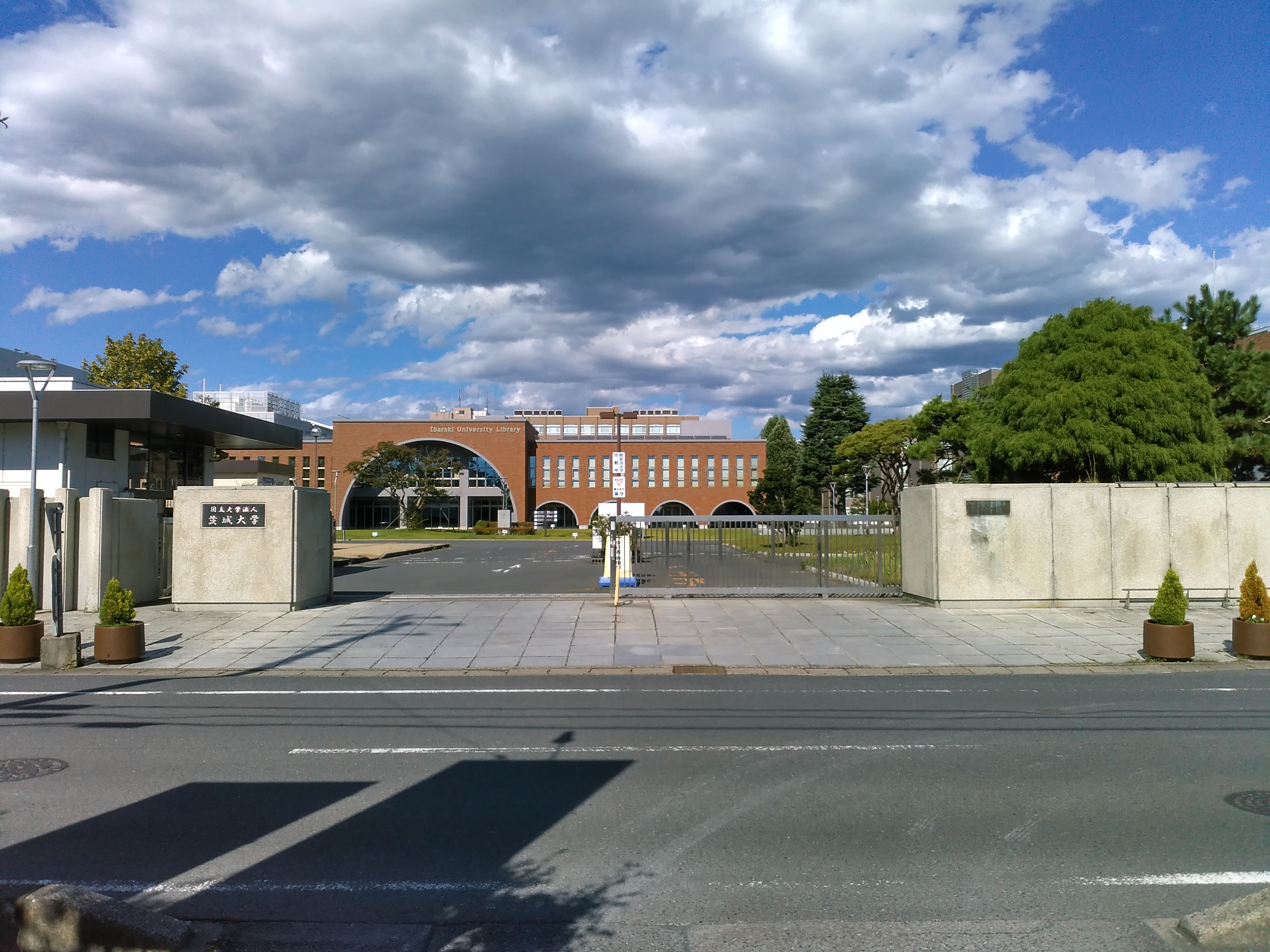
- Main Gate of Mito Campus
- Type: National university
- Established: May 31, 1949
- Location: Mito, Ibaraki, Kantō, Japan
- Website: www.ibaraki.ac.jp/en/

Ibaraki University (茨城大学, Ibaraki Daigaku) is a Japanese national university located in Ibaraki Prefecture, with campuses in the cities of Mito, Ami and Hitachi. It was established on May 31, 1949, integrating these prewar institutions: Mito High School (Mito Kōtō-Gakkō), Ibaraki Normal School (Ibaraki Shihan-Gakkō), Ibaraki Juvenile Normal School (Ibaraki Seinen Shihan-Gakkō), and Taga Technical Specialists' College (Taga Kōgyō Senmon-Gakkō). The initial colleges were the College of Arts and Sciences, the College of Education, and the College of Engineering.

== Undergraduate and Graduate Schools ==
Undergraduate Courses

- College of Humanities and Social Sciences (at Mito Campus)
- College of Education (at Mito Campus)
- College of Science (at Mito Campus)
- College of Engineering (at Hitachi Campus)
- College of Agriculture (at Ami Campus)

Graduate Courses

- Graduate School of Humanities
- Graduate School of Education
- Graduate School of Science and Engineering
- Graduate School of Agriculture

== Research Institutes ==
- Institute of Regional Studies
- Institute of Izura Art Culture
- Frontier Research Center for Applied Atomic Sciences

== Timeline ==
- 1952, April – Ibaraki Prefectural University of Agriculture (Noka Daigaku) was placed under national management and established as the College of Agriculture, Ibaraki University
- 1955, June – Establishment of Izura Institute of Arts and Culture
- 1955, July – Establishment of the Junior College of Technology
- 1967, June – Establishment of the College of Humanities, the College of Science, and the College of Liberal Arts as a result of the reorganization of the College of Arts and Sciences
- 1968, April – Establishment of the Graduate School of Engineering
- 1969, January – Establishment of the Institute of General Regional Studies*
- 1970, April – Establishment of the Graduate School of Agriculture
- 1973, April – Opening of the University Health Center
- 1979, April – Establishment of the Graduate School of Science
- 1985, April – Became a constitutive university for the United Graduate School of Agricultural Science (Doctoral program) in Tokyo University of Agriculture and Technology
- 1985, July – Establishment of the Information Processing Center*
- 1988, April – Establishment of the Graduate School of Education
- 1989, May – Establishment of the Center for Cooperative Research and Development
- 1991, April – Establishment of the Graduate School of Humanities, and the Center for Instrumental Analysis
- 1992, April – Establishment of the Center for Education and Research in Lifelong Learning
- 1993, March – Abolition of the Junior College of Technology
- 1993, April – Establishment of the Graduate School of Engineering (Doctoral program)
- 1995, April – Merger of the Graduate School of Engineering and the Graduate School of Science into the Graduate School of Science and Engineering
- 1996, March – Abolition of the College of Liberal Arts
- 1996, April – Establishment of Center for Research and Development in University Education*
- 1997, April – Establishment of Center for Water Environmental Studies
- 1998, April – Reorganization of Information Processing Center
- 1999, April – Opening of Gene Research Center
- 2006, April – Establishment of Institute for Global Change Adaptation Science
- 2008, April – Establishment of Frontier Research Center for Applied Atomic Sciences
- 2014, April – Establishment of Social Collaboration Center
- 2017, April – Reorganization of College of Humanities and Social Sciences and Institute for Liberal Arts Education

* indicates facilities established according to the university's internal decisions.
