= Kawachi, Ibaraki =

Kawachi 河内町
- Town
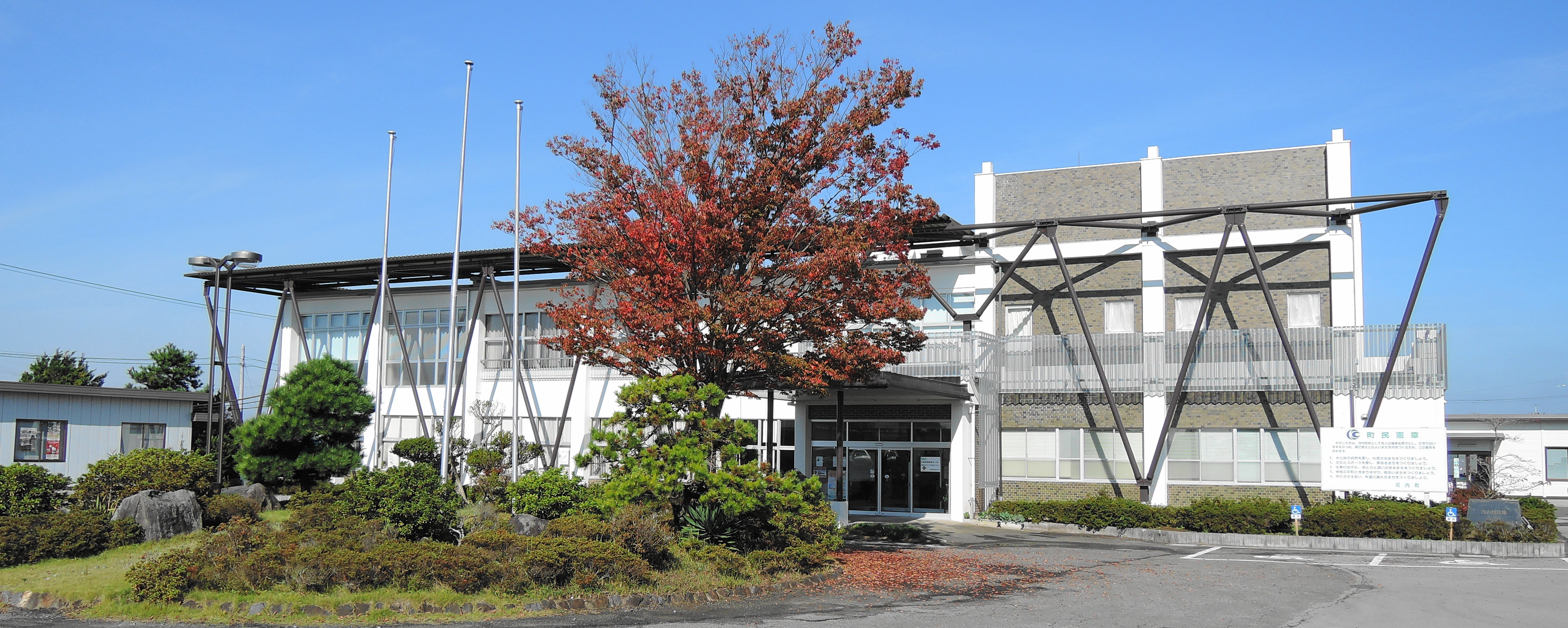
- Kawachi town hall

- Flag Emblem

- Location of Kawachi in Ibaraki Prefecture

- Coordinates: 35°53′5.1″N 140°14′40.2″E
- Country: Japan
- Region: Kantō
- Prefecture: Ibaraki
- District: Inashiki

Area
  - Total: 44.30 km^{2} (17.10 sq mi)

Population (October 2020)
  - Total: 8,298
  - Density: 187.3/km^{2} (485.1/sq mi)
- Time zone: UTC+9 (Japan Standard Time)
- Tree: Zelkova serrata
- Flower: Hydrangea macrophylla
- Bird: Eurasian skylark
- Phone number: 0297-84-2111
- Address: 1183 Genseida, Kawachi-machi, Inashiki-gun, Ibaraki-ken 300-1392
- Website: Official website

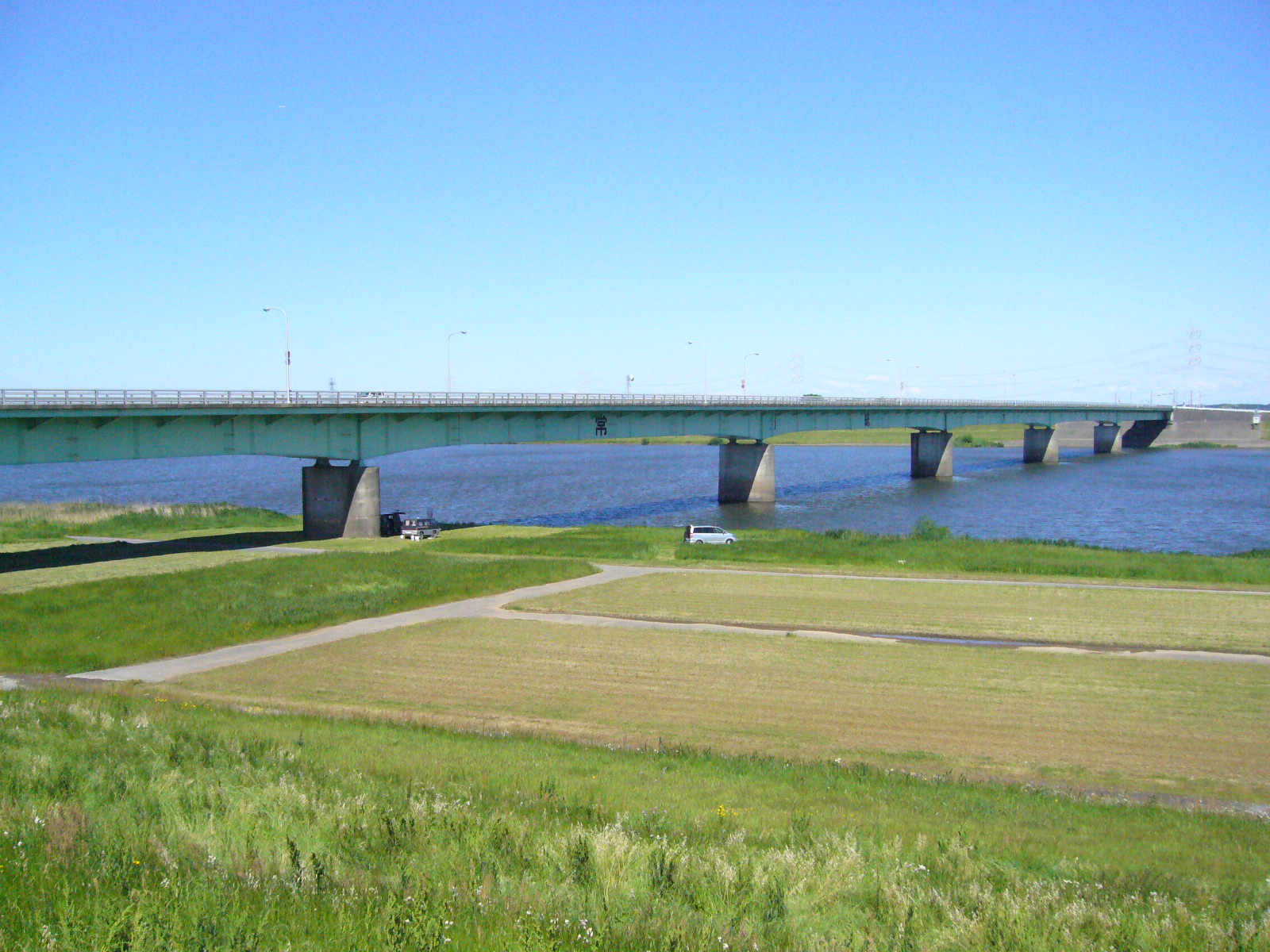
Joso Bridge across the Tone River at Kawachi

Kawachi (河内町, Kawachi-machi) is a town located in Ibaraki Prefecture, Japan. As of 1 July 2020, the city had an estimated population of 8,298 in 2986 households and a population density of 183 persons per km^{2}. The percentage of the population aged over 65 was 39.5%. The total area of the city is 44.30 square kilometres (17.10 sq mi).

== Geography ==
Located in extreme southern Ibaraki Prefecture bordering Chiba Prefecture, Kawachi is long and narrow east–west, and bordered by the Tone River and Shin-Tone River.

=== Surrounding municipalities ===
Chiba Prefecture

- Kōzaki
- Narita
- Sakae

Ibaraki Prefecture

- Inashiki
- Ryūgasaki
- Tone

=== Climate ===
Kawachi has a Humid continental climate (Köppen Cfa) characterized by warm summers and cool winters with light snowfall. The average annual temperature in Kawachi is 14.4 °C. The average annual rainfall is 1376 mm with September as the wettest month. The temperatures are highest on average in August, at around 26.1 °C, and lowest in January, at around 3.6 °C.

== Demographics ==
Per Japanese census data, the population of Kawachi has declined in recent decades and is now less than it was a century ago.

Historical population
Year	Pop.	±%
1920	10,831	—
1930	11,093	+2.4%
1940	11,397	+2.7%
1950	14,205	+24.6%
1960	13,065	−8.0%
1970	11,720	−10.3%
1980	11,516	−1.7%
1990	11,201	−2.7%
2000	11,502	+2.7%
2010	10,172	−11.6%
2020	8,231	−19.1%

== History ==
The villages of Nagasao, Genseida, and Mamaita were created within Kawachi District, Ibaraki Prefecture the establishment of the modern municipalities system on April 1, 1889. At the same time, the village of Kanaetsu from Katori District, Chiba and a portion of Toyosumi Village in Shimohabu District, Chiba were transferred to Ibaraki Prefecture. The border between ancient Hitachi Province and Shimōsa Province was the Tone River; however, due to shifting of the riverbed by the Meiji period, it was located on the north bank of the river. The three villages originally from Hitachi Province were merged to form the village of Kawachi on April 1, 1955. On February 15, 1958, the neighboring village of Kanaetsu was annexed to Kawachi.

== Government ==
Kawachi has a mayor-council form of government with a directly elected mayor and a unicameral town council of 12 members. Kawachi, together with neighboring Inashiki, contributes one member to the Ibaraki Prefectural Assembly. In terms of national politics, the town is part of Ibaraki 3rd district of the lower house of the Diet of Japan.

== Education ==
Kawachi Gakuen is the only compulsory education combined elementary and junior high school in Kawachi. The academy was established by integrating two junior high schools in 2017 and three elementary schools in 2018. The town does not have a senior high school.

== Transportation ==
=== Railway ===
- Kawachi does not have any passenger train service. The nearest stations are Namegawa in neighboring Narita and Ryūgasaki in neighboring Ryūgasaki.

=== Highway ===
- National Route 408

== Local attractions ==
- Ōtone Airport
