= Inashiki District =

District located in Ibaraki Prefecture, Japan

Coordinates: 35.994°N 140.275°E

Inashiki District (yellow) in Ibaraki Prefecture. Upper left Ami, upper right Mijo and lower Kawachi.

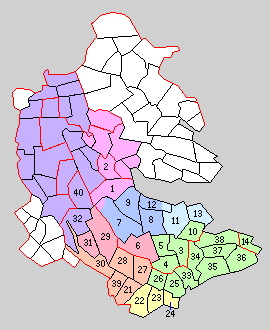
Towns and villages with number of the Shida (1–14) and Kōchi (21–40) districts in 1889. Currently in Peach: Tsuchiura City, Orange: Ryugasaki City, Red: Ushiku City, Purple: Tsukuba City, Yellow: Kawachi Town, Green: Inashiki City, Blue: Ami Town, Light Blue: Miho Village.

Inashiki (稲敷郡, Inashiki-gun) is a district located in Ibaraki Prefecture, Japan.

== Population and area ==
Following the Inashiki merger but as of November 1, 2021 population data, the district has an estimated population of 70,598 and a density of 387 persons per km^{2}. Its total area is 182.31 km^{2}.

== Geography ==
Ami Town and Miho Village are neighboring municipalities, separated about 12 kilometers from the border of Kawachi Town.

== Towns and villages ==
The district currently has 2 towns and 1 village.

Name	Japanese name	Description
Ami Town	阿見町	Ami is bordered to the north by Lake Kasumigaura
Miho Village	美浦村	Miho is bordered by Lake Kasumigaura to the north and east
Kawachi Town	河内町	Kawachi is bordered to the south by Tone River

== Mergers ==
Predecessor districts: Kōchi (or Kawachi) District and Shida District.

In 1889 Shida with 1 town and 13 villages, and Kōchi with 1 town and 19 villages. (2 towns and 32 villages)

=== District creation ===
The Inashiki District was much larger, originating from the ancient Kōchi and Shida districts.

- 1896 (Meiji 29)
  - April 1 Established in most areas of Kōchi District (excluding Onogawa Village) and most of Shida District (excluding Azuma Village and Nakaya Village) due to the enforcement of the county system. (2 towns and 29 villages)

=== Latest mergers ===
- 1996 (Heisei 8)
  - June 1 Shintone Village enforces the town system and becomes Shintone Town. Kawachi Village enforces the town system and becomes Kawachi Town. (5 towns and 3 villages)
  - September 1 Azuma Village enforces the town system and becomes Azuma Town. (6 towns and 2 villages)
- November 1, 2002 Kukizaki Town was transferred to Tsukuba City. (5 towns and 2 villages)
- On March 22, 2005, the towns of Azuma, Edosaki and Shintone and the village of Sakuragawa merged to form the new city of Inashiki. (2 towns and 1 village)

== Gallery ==
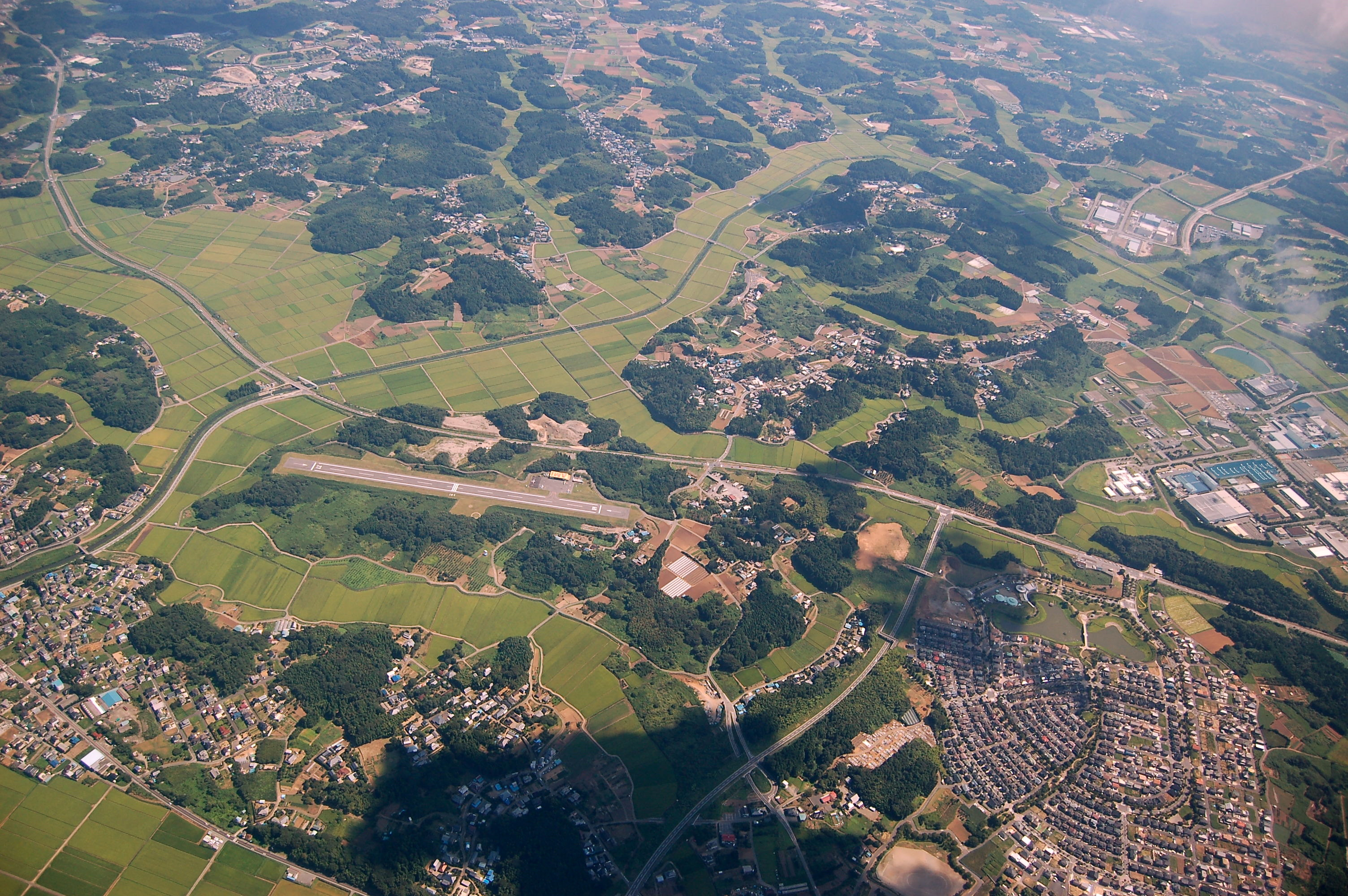
A view of the east part of Ami Town. Ami Airfield on the left.

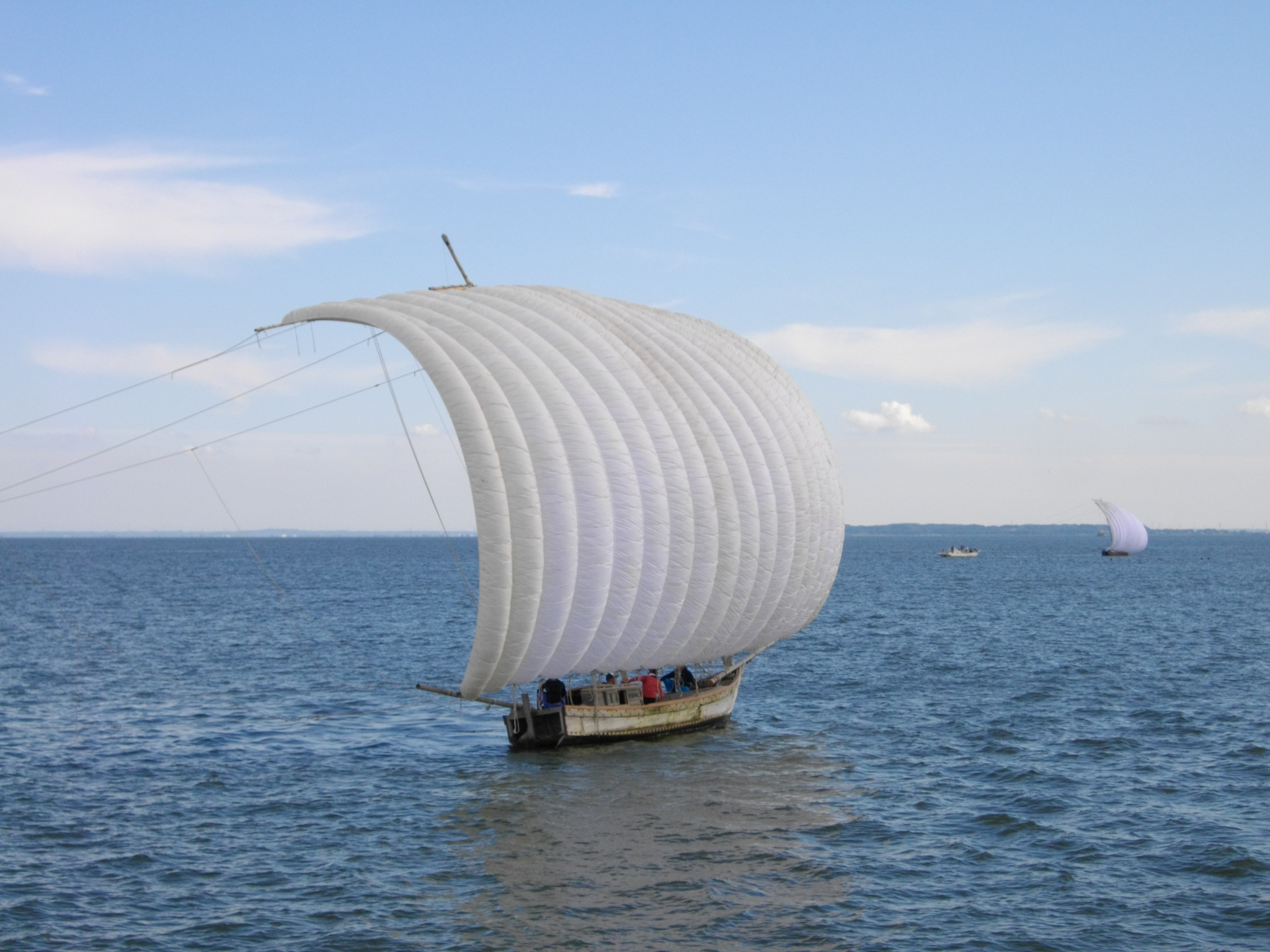
Hobikibune (Sailboat) on Lake Kasumigaura.

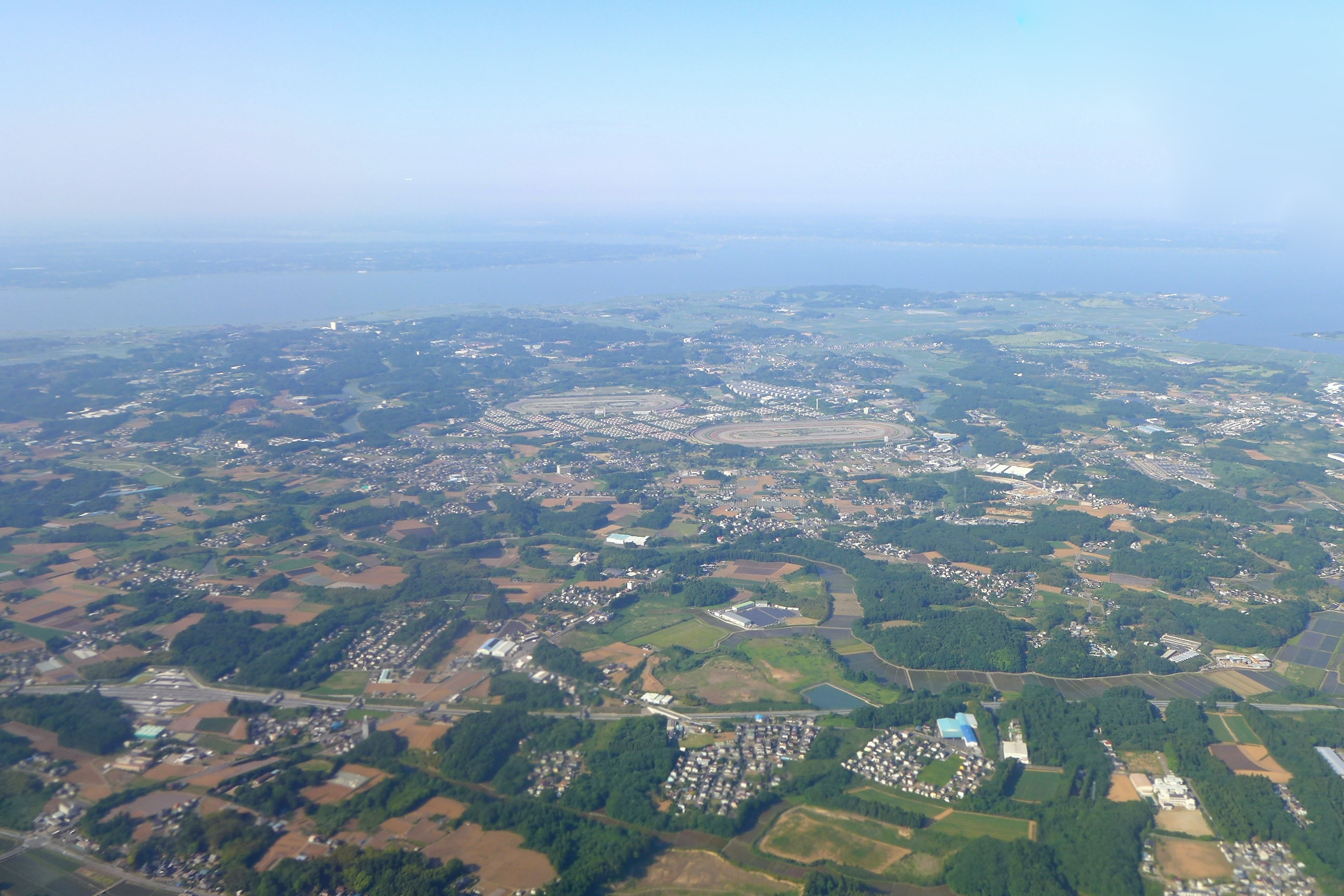
Miho Village area, in the background Lake Kasumigaura.

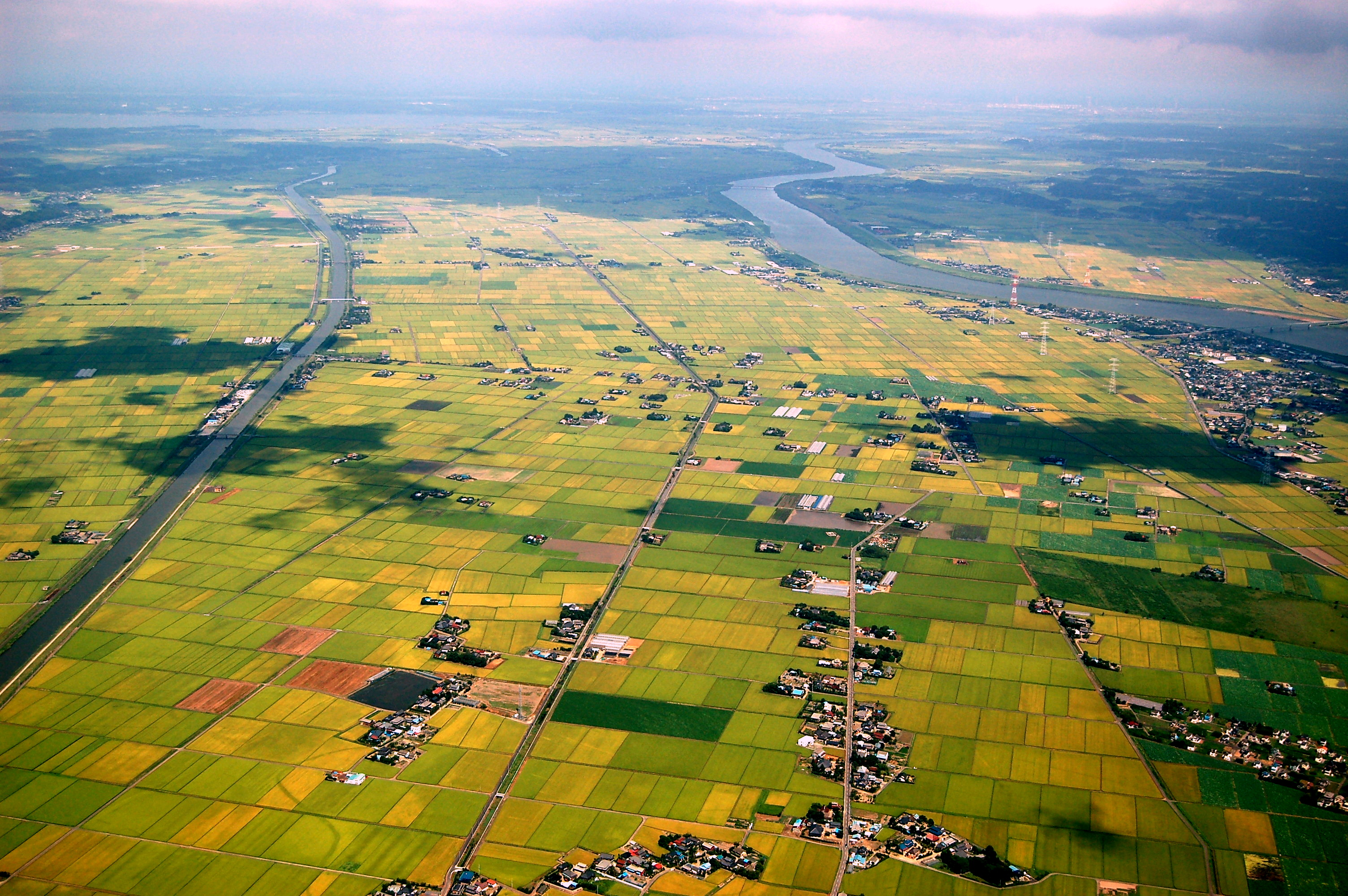
Rivers Shintone (left) and Tone (right), Inashiki City and Kawachi Town.
