= E655 series =

Japanese train type

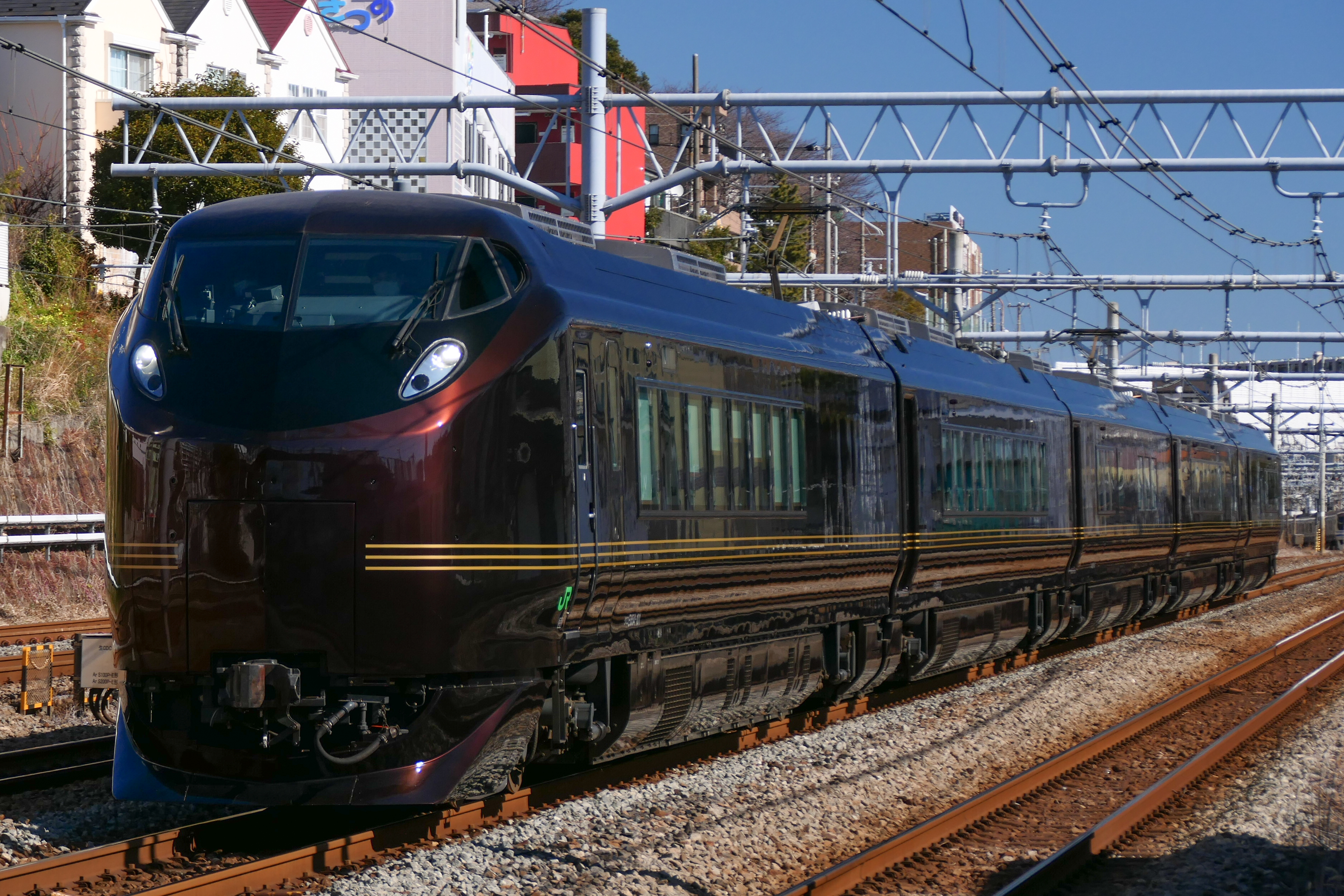
- E655 series in February 2022
- In service: 2007–present
- Manufacturers: Hitachi, Tokyu Car Corporation
- Designer: Kenmochi Design Associates
- Constructed: 2007
- Number built: 6 vehicles
- Number in service: 6 vehicles
- Formation: 5–6 cars per trainset (can be rearranged)
- Capacity: 107
- Operator: JR East
- Depot: Oku

Specifications
- Car body construction: Aluminium alloy
- Car length: 21.365 m (70 ft 1.1 in) (end cars, over couplers); 20.500 m (67 ft 3.1 in) (intermediate cars)
- Width: 2.946 m (9 ft 8.0 in)
- Height: 3.940 m (12 ft 11.1 in) (head of end cars); 3.695 m (12 ft 1.5 in) (side roof cover height); 3.960 m (12 ft 11.9 in) (with pantograph folded)
- Doors: 1 per side
- Maximum speed: 130 km/h (81 mph)
- Traction system: 2-level IGBT-VVVF (Hitachi)
- Traction motors: 4 × Hitachi MT75A 140 kW (188 hp) 3-phase AC squirrel-cage induction motor
- Power output: 2.24 MW (3,004 hp)
- Electric systems: 1,500 V DC and 20 kV 50/60 Hz AC, all from overhead catenary
- Current collection: Pantograph
- Safety systems: ATS-P, ATS-Ps
- Multiple working: E657 series
- Track gauge: 1,067 mm (3 ft 6 in)

The E655 series (E655系) is an AC/DC dual-voltage electric multiple unit (EMU) train operated by East Japan Railway Company (JR East) in Japan. The single 5-car trainset is used as a luxury charter train called Nagomi (なごみ(和)), and also as the Imperial train by inserting a dedicated Imperial carriage.

== Formation ==
The trainset is normally formed as a five-car set, as shown below.

1. KuRo E655-101 (Tsc') (with diesel generator)
2. MoRo E655-101 (M1s) (with 2 pantographs)
3. MoRo E654-101 (M2s)
4. MoRo E655-201 (M1s) (with 2 pantographs)
5. KuMoRo E654-101 (M2sc)

The Imperial carriage, classified "TR" and numbered E655-1, is inserted between cars 3 and 4 for Imperial Train duties.

Cars 1 to 3 were built by Tokyu Car Corporation, and the other three cars were built by Hitachi

The E655 series unit can be hauled by a diesel locomotive on non-electrified lines, in which case power for air conditioning and lighting is supplied by the diesel generator in car 1.

== Interior ==
Seating in cars 1 to 5 is in 2+1 configuration. The nine seats in car 3 are leather-covered.

== "TR" car E655-1 ==
The special "TR" imperial train car can also operate sandwiched within other EMU trainsets, and has been test run in an E257 series set (December 2008), E653 series set (April 2009), and E657 series set (September 2011).

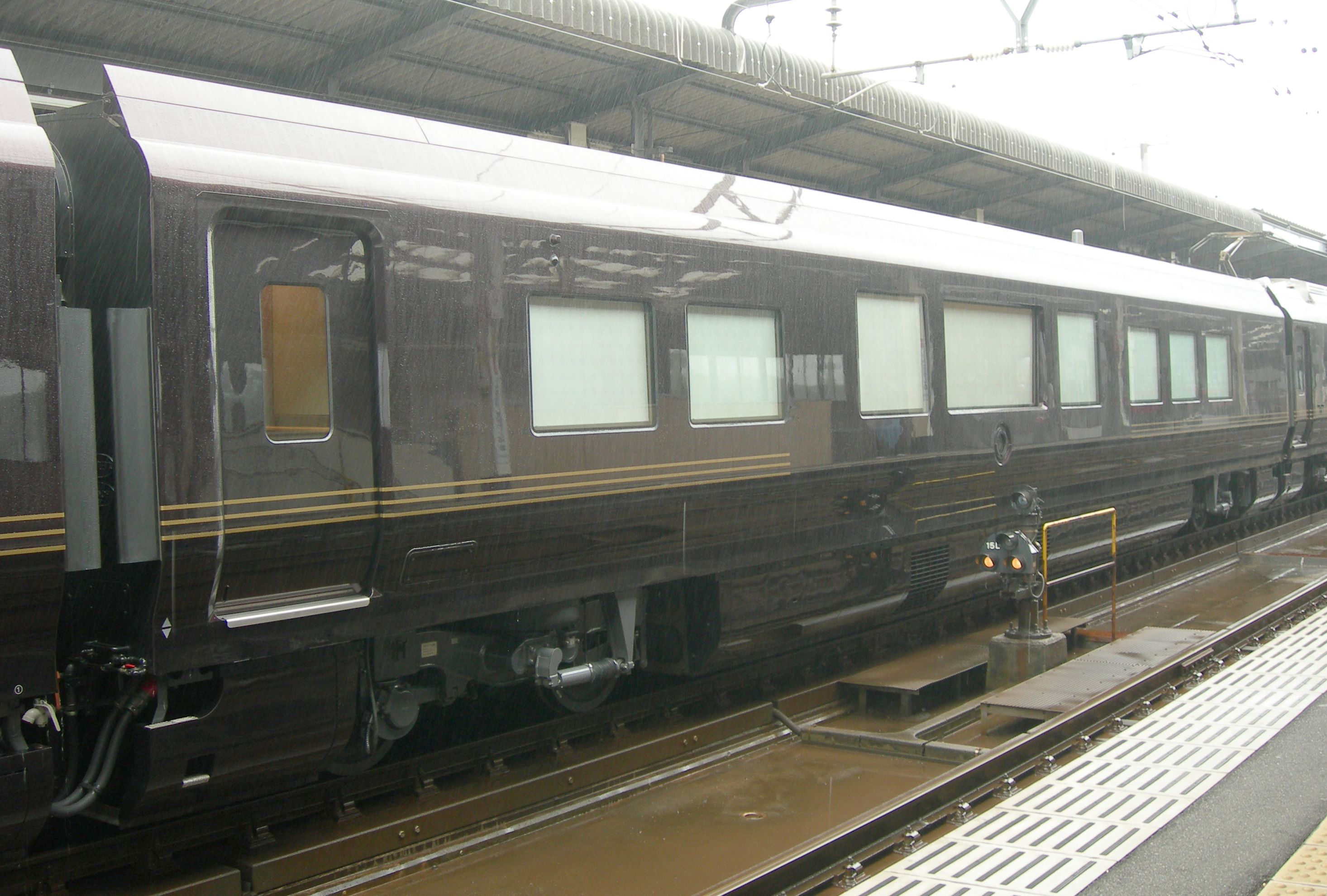
"TR" car E655-1 on a test run, September 2010

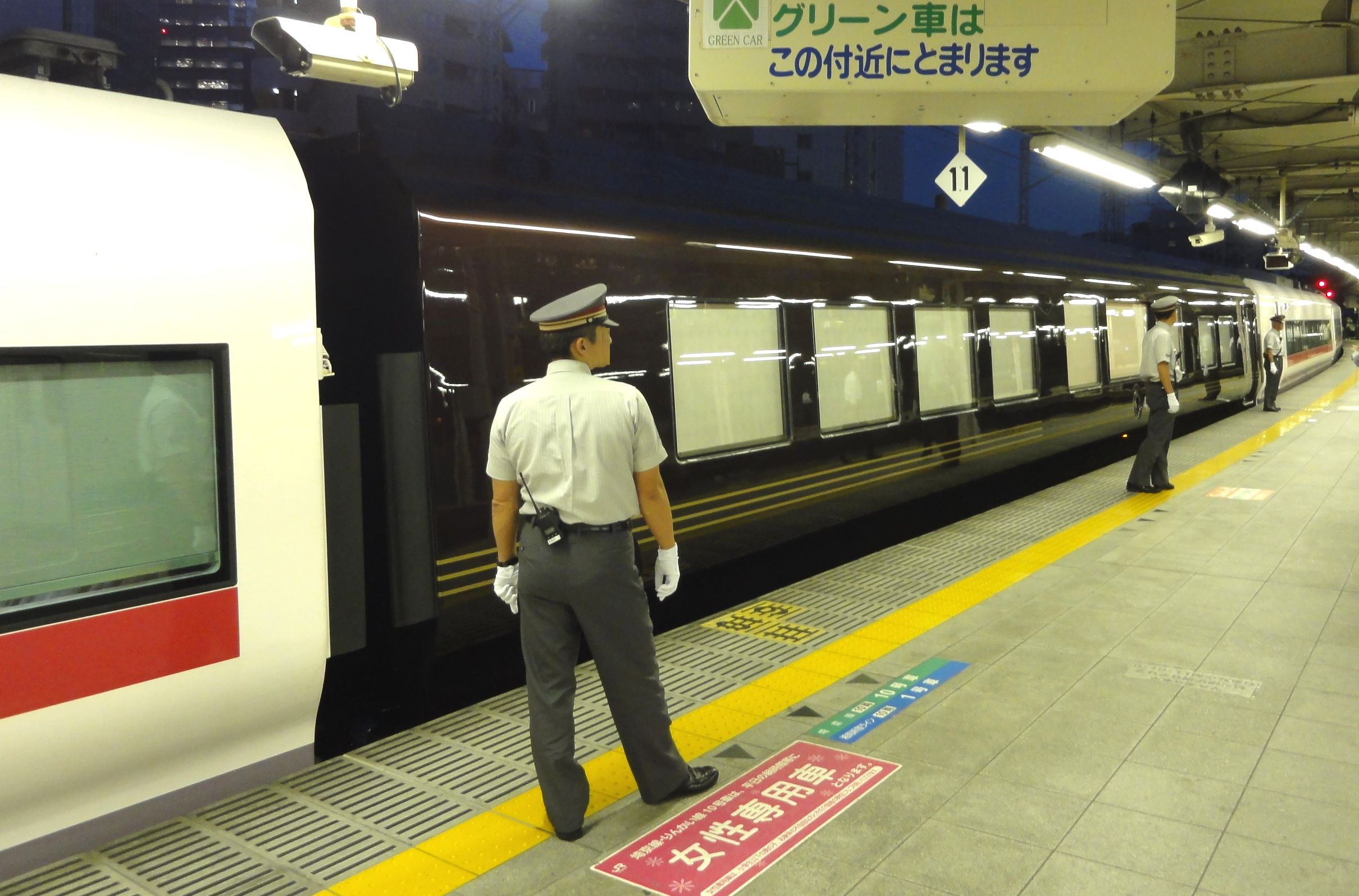
"TR" car E655-1 on a test run sandwiched in E657 series set K-1, September 2011

== History ==
JR East announced in June 2004 its plans to build a new VIP train which would also replace the former locomotive-hauled imperial train. The E655 series trainset was delivered in July 2007, and unveiled to the media at Ueno Station in Tokyo on 24 July 2007, before undergoing test running on various lines in the Kanto Region. The first revenue-earning service operated by the train was on 23 November 2007, when it was used for a charter service for JR East's "Otona no Kyujitsu Club" between Ueno and Kōriyama. On 13 December 2007, JR East announced that the train would be called Nagomi. The first Imperial Train working was on 12 November 2008, when the train was used to convey the Japanese Imperial couple and the Spanish Royal couple between Ueno and Tsuchiura.

== Imperial train workings ==
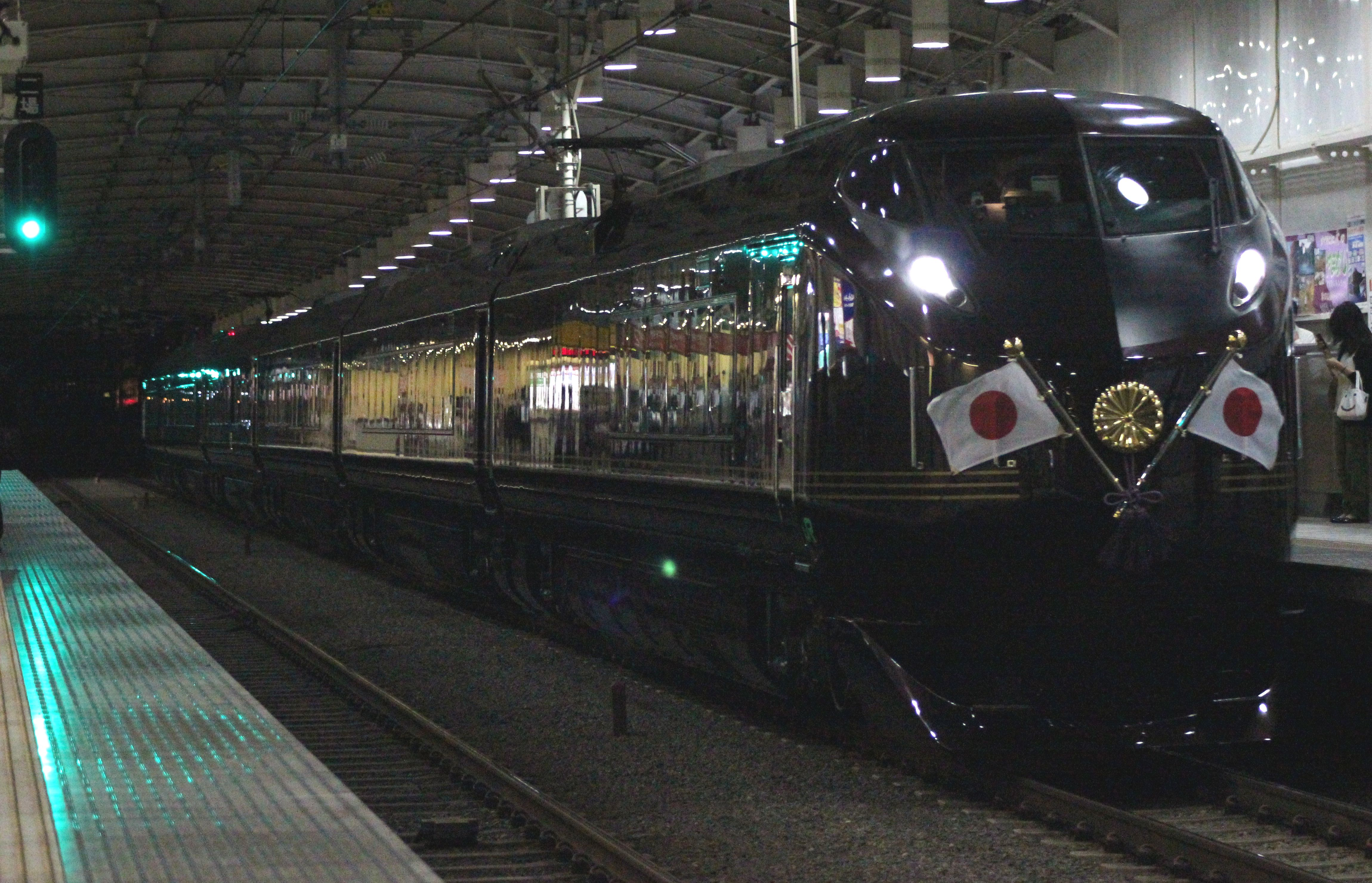
The E655 series set on an imperial train working on the Chuo Line, October 2012

The E655 series set has been used on the following imperial train workings.

| Date | Route | Conveying |
|---|---|---|
| 12 November 2008 | Ueno → Tsuchiura | Imperial Couple and Spanish Royal Couple |
| 13 November 2011 | Tokyo → Kofu | Crown Prince |
| 6 October 2012 | Tokyo – Kofu (return) | Imperial Couple |

== See also ==
- Joyful Train, the generic name for excursion and charter trains operated in Japan
