= E657 series =

Japanese train type

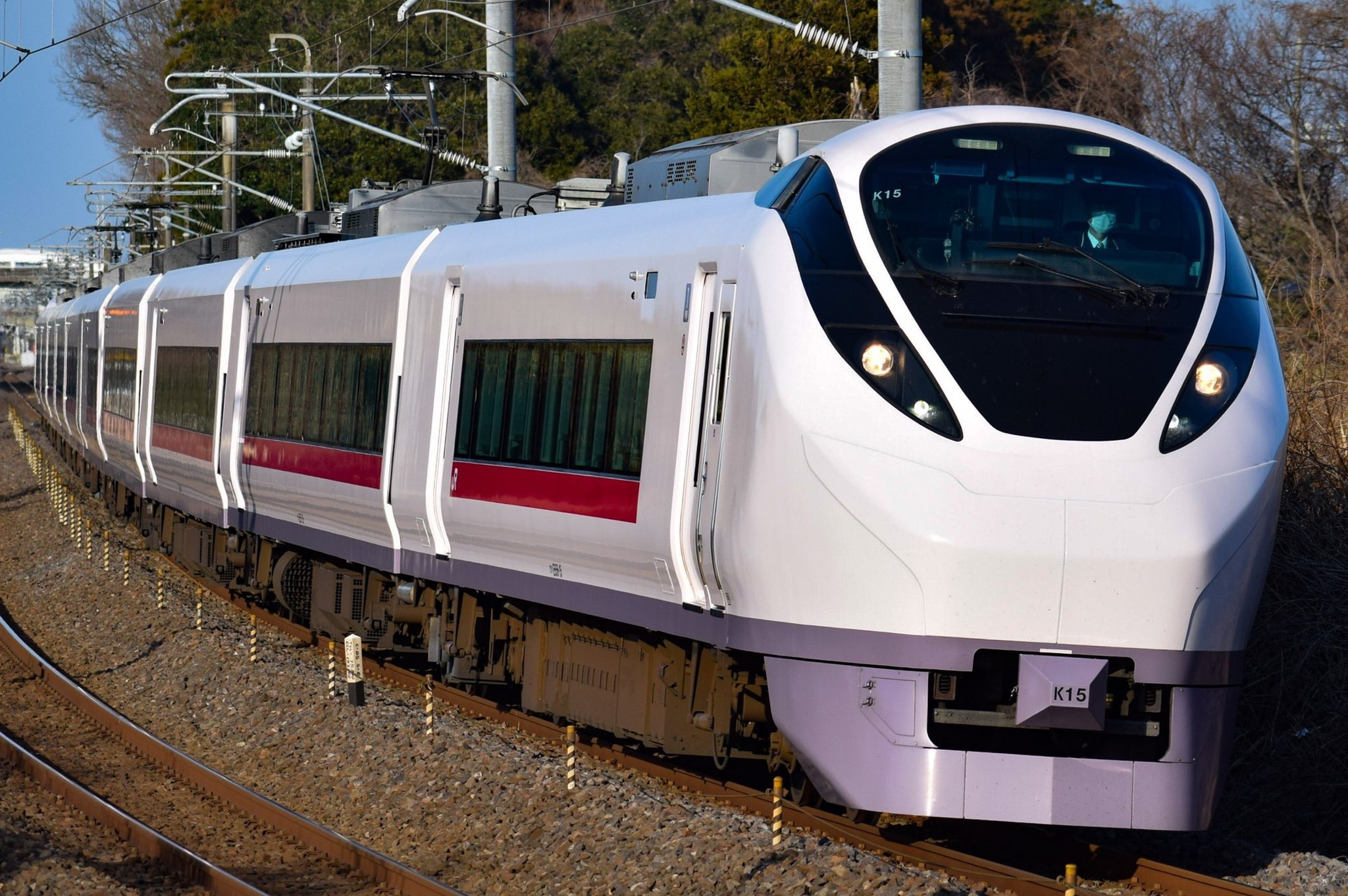
- Set K-15 in March 2019
- In service: 2012–present
- Manufacturers: Hitachi, J-TREC, Kinki Sharyo
- Replaced: 651 series, E653 series
- Constructed: 2011–2014, 2019
- Entered service: 3 March 2012
- Number built: 190 vehicles (19 sets)
- Number in service: 190 vehicles (19 sets)
- Formation: 10 cars per trainset
- Fleet numbers: K-1 – K-19
- Capacity: 600 (Green: 30, Standard: 570)
- Operator: JR East
- Depot: Katsuta
- Line served: Joban Line

Specifications
- Car body construction: Aluminium alloy
- Car length: 21,100 mm (69 ft 3 in) (end cars); 20,000 mm (65 ft 7 in) (intermediate cars)
- Width: 2,946 mm (9 ft 8.0 in)
- Height: 4,249 mm (13 ft 11.3 in)
- Doors: 1 per side (2 on end cars)
- Maximum speed: 130 km/h (81 mph)
- Traction system: 3-core IGBT-VVVF (Hitachi)
- Traction motors: MT75B 140 kW (188 hp) 3-phase AC squirrel-cage induction motor (Hitachi)
- Acceleration: 0.56 m/s^{2} (1.3 mph/s)
- Deceleration: 1.4 m/s^{2} (3.1 mph/s)
- Electric systems: 1,500 V DC and 20 kV 50 Hz AC, all from overhead catenary
- Current collection: PS37A pantograph
- Bogies: DT78 (motored), TR263 (trailer)
- Safety systems: ATS-P, ATS-Ps
- Multiple working: E655 series
- Track gauge: 1,067 mm (3 ft 6 in)

The E657 series (E657系) is an AC/DC dual-voltage electric multiple unit (EMU) train type operated by East Japan Railway Company (JR East) in Japan on limited express services between Ueno in Tokyo and Iwaki on the Joban Line since March 2012.

The trains replaced the 651 series and E653 series EMUs previously used on Super Hitachi and Fresh Hitachi limited express services on the Joban Line. The first train in revenue service ran on 3 March 2012, in the form of a special return Super Hitachi limited express service between Ueno and Iwaki, with regular scheduled services starting from the revised timetable on 17 March 2012. The initial order of sixteen 10-car sets was in service by the start of the revised timetable on 16 March 2013.

== Design ==
The front end design is derived from the earlier Super Hitachi 651 series trains, and the pale pink body colour with red lining is intended to evoke an image of the ume plums for which the area served by the trains is famous.

The end cars and Green (first class) cars feature full active suspension for improved ride quality, and yaw dampers are fitted between cars.

=== Bogies ===
The DT78 (motored) and TR263 (trailer) bolsterless bogies are developed from the DT77 and TR262 bogies used on the E259 series EMUs, with improvements to cope with the increased vehicle weight and provide increased snow and cold weather resistance. The end bogies of the Tc driving cars are designated TR263, the inner bogies of the Tc driving cars and the Ts car are designated TR263A, and the bogies on the T1 car are designated TR262B. All the bogies use tread brakes, and the trailer bogies additionally use two disc brakes per axle. Wheel diameter is 860 mm (33.9 in), and the distance between wheel centres is 2.1 m (6 ft 11 in).

== Formation ==
Each unit consists of ten cars, formed as shown below, with car 1 at the Ueno end. The six "M" cars are motored.

Car No.	1	2	3	4	5	6	7	8	9	10
Designation	Tc'	M1	M2	T1	Ts	M1	M2	M1	M2	Tc
Numbering	KuHa E656	MoHa E657-200	MoHa E656-200	SaHa E657	SaRo E657-200	MoHa E657-100	MoHa E656-100	MoHa E657	MoHa E656	KuHa E657
Weight (t)	36.1	41.4	40.0	31.1	34.1	41.4	40.0	41.4	40.0	34.8
Seating capacity	44	68	64	72	30	66	64	68	64	60

Cars 2, 6, and 8 each have one PS37A single-arm pantograph.

== Interior ==
Internally, the Green car (first class) accommodation is in 2+2 abreast configuration with a seat pitch of 1.16 m (45.7 in). Standard class is arranged 2+2 with a seat pitch of 960 mm (37.8 in), compared to 970 mm (38.2 in) for Super Hitachi 651 series trains and 910 mm (35.8 in) for Fresh Hitachi E653 series trains.

AC power outlets are provided at each seat, and WiMAX wireless broadband internet access is available. The trains include universal access toilets and security cameras.

Between October 2013 and around March 2015, the fleet was scheduled to be retro-fitted with LED seat reservation status indicators above each seat.

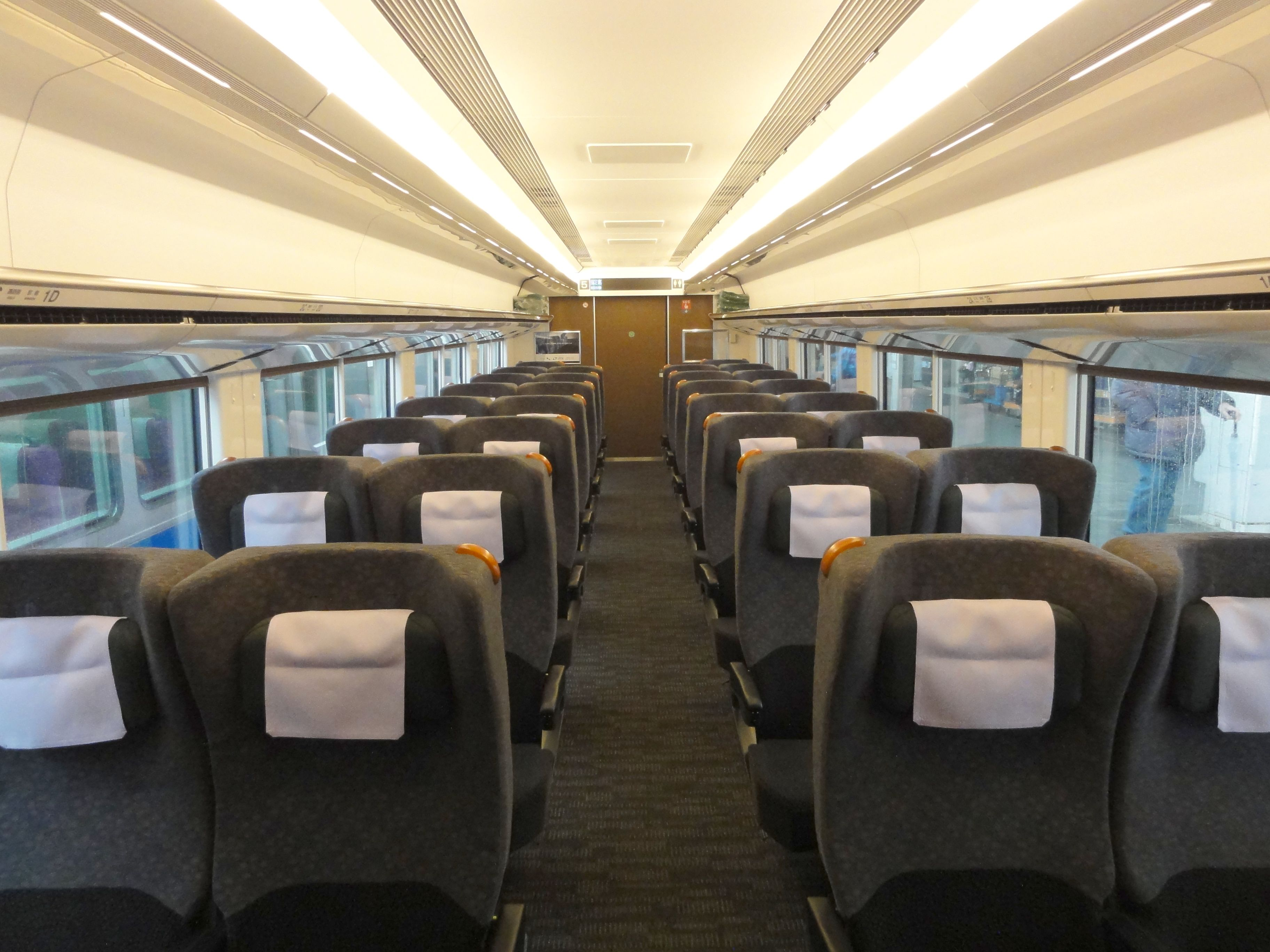
Green class car SaRo E657-3, March 2012

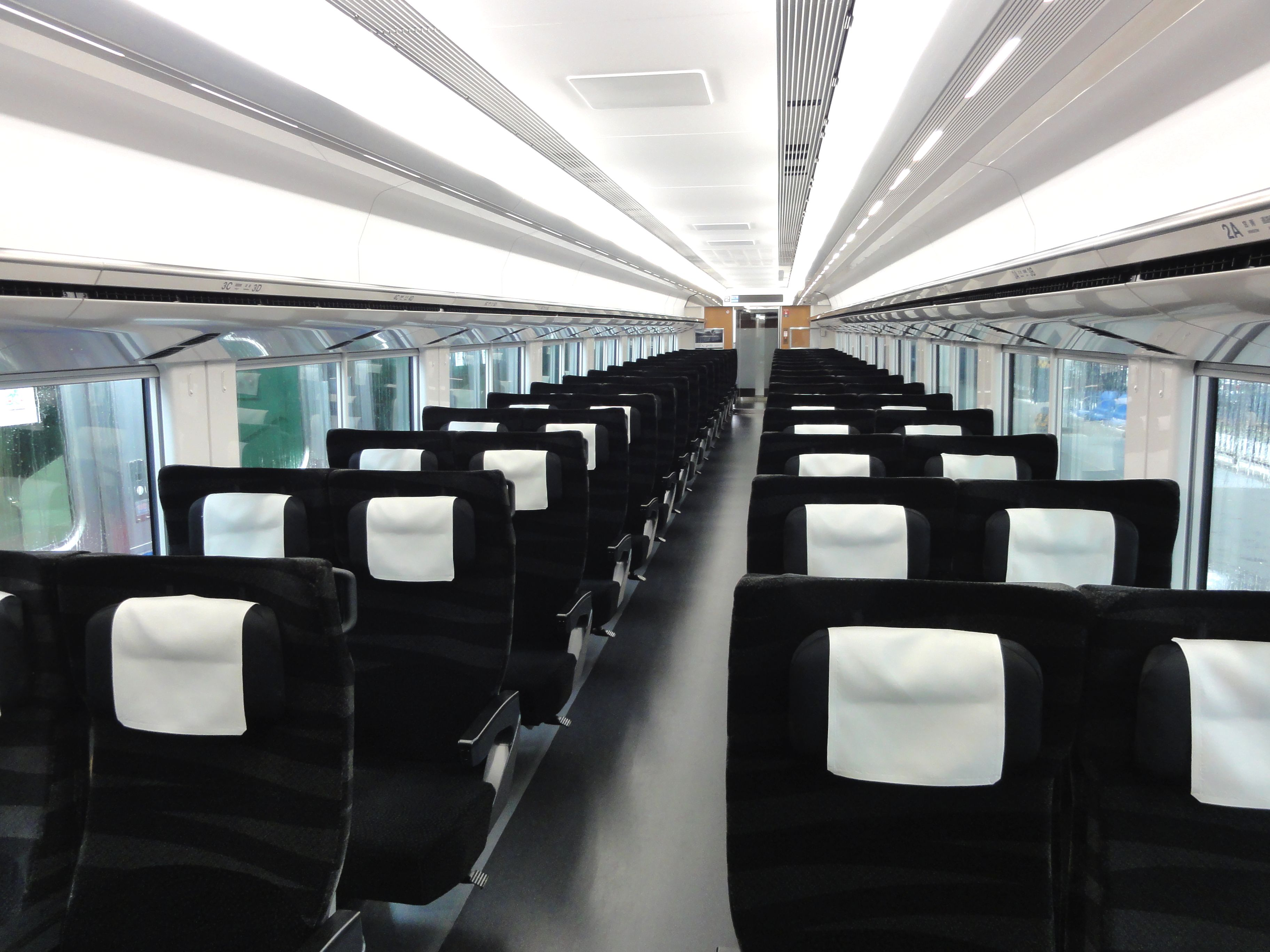
Standard class car MoHa E657-203, March 2012

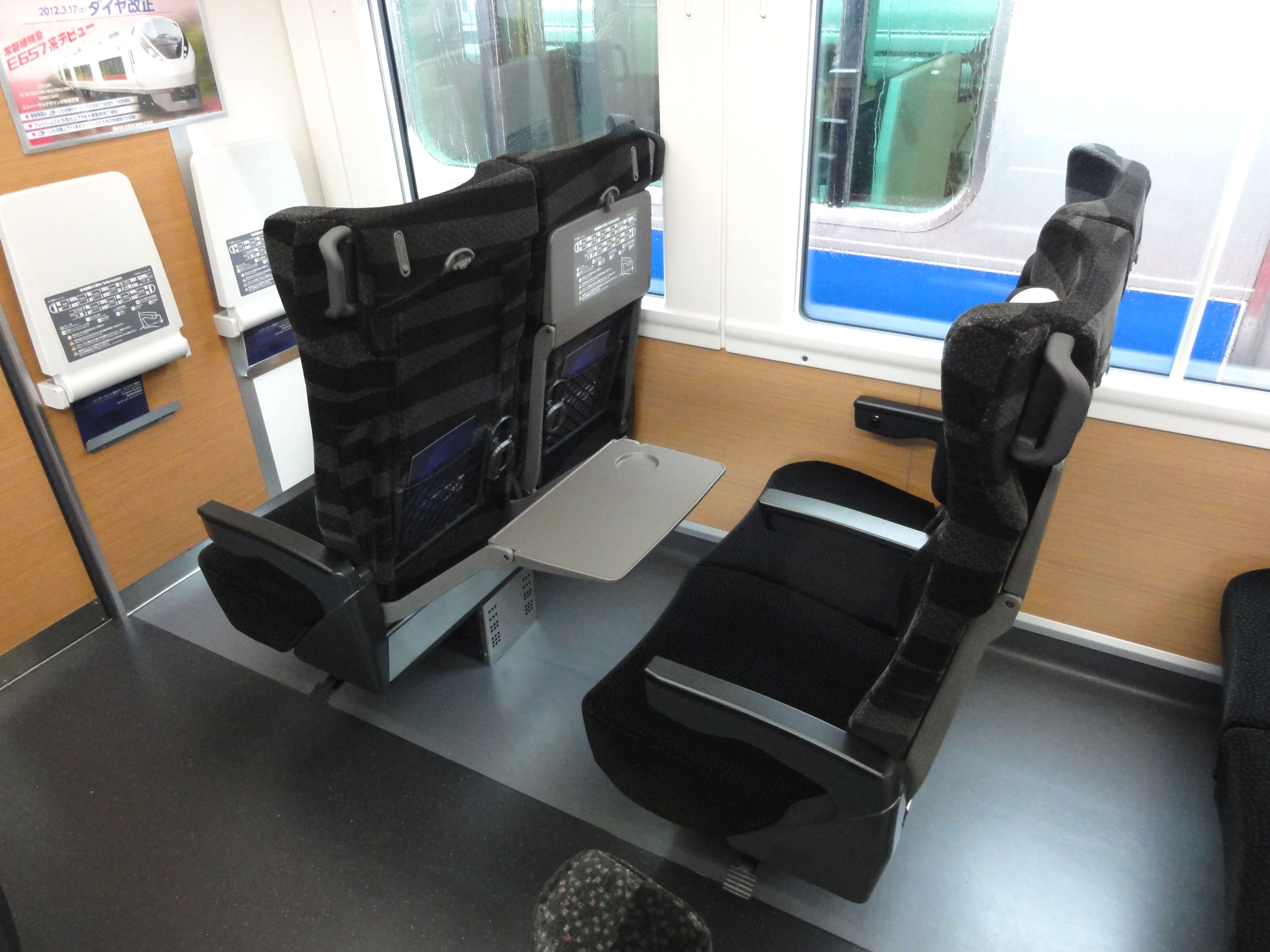
Standard-class seating, March 2012

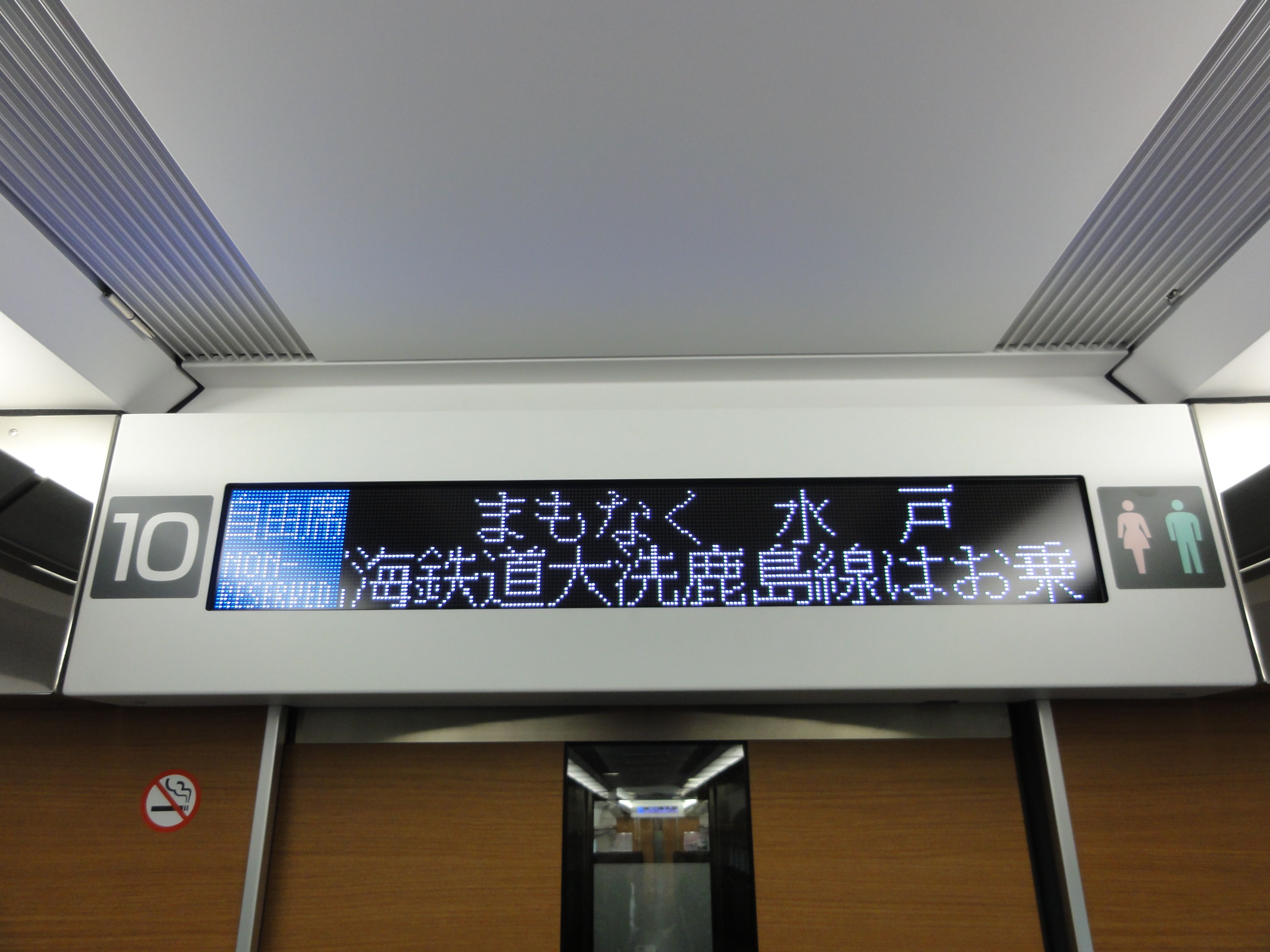
LED passenger information display, March 2012

== History ==
In March 2011, the first completed five cars (half a set - cars 1 to 5) were delivered from Kinki Sharyo's Osaka factory and moved to Hitachi's factory in Yamaguchi Prefecture. The first 10-car set was then scheduled to be moved from Hitachi's factory to JR East's Katsuta Depot on the Jōban Line in April, but this was postponed until May 2011 due to the 2011 Tōhoku earthquake and tsunami. Test running on the Jōban Line commenced on 27 May 2011.

Seven sets were delivered for the start of the revised timetable from 17 March 2012.

The first E657 series set built by Japan Transport Engineering Company (J-TREC) in Yokohama, K-9, was delivered in August 2012. This was also the first train to be built for JR East by the company following its renaming from Tokyu Car Corporation.

In June 2025, JR East announced its plans to introduce a new overnight express train service in 2027, which will be operated by a modified E657 series set. The service is planned to operate in areas including the Tokyo metropolitan area and northern Tōhoku region.

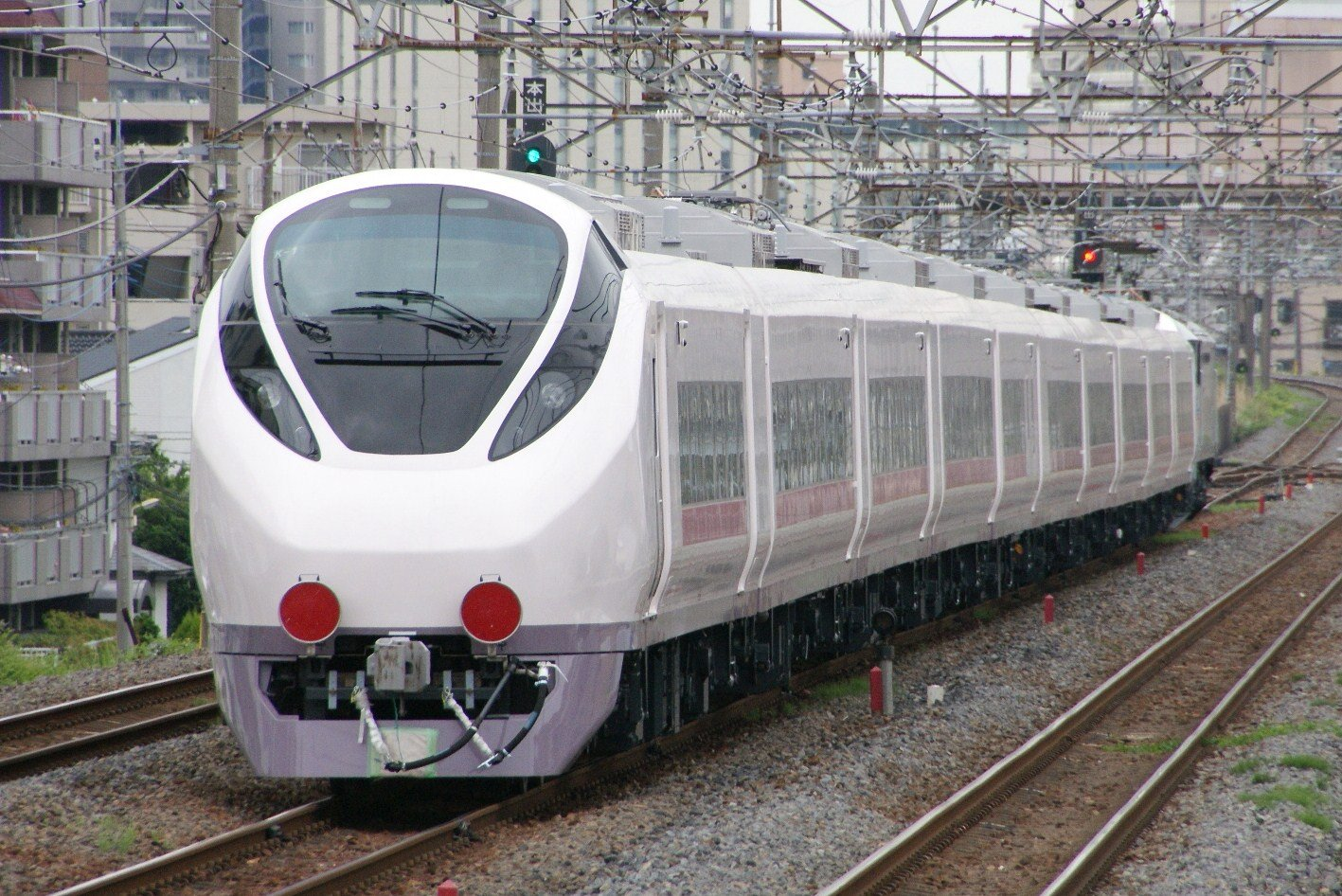
First E657 series set, K-1, being delivered, May 2011

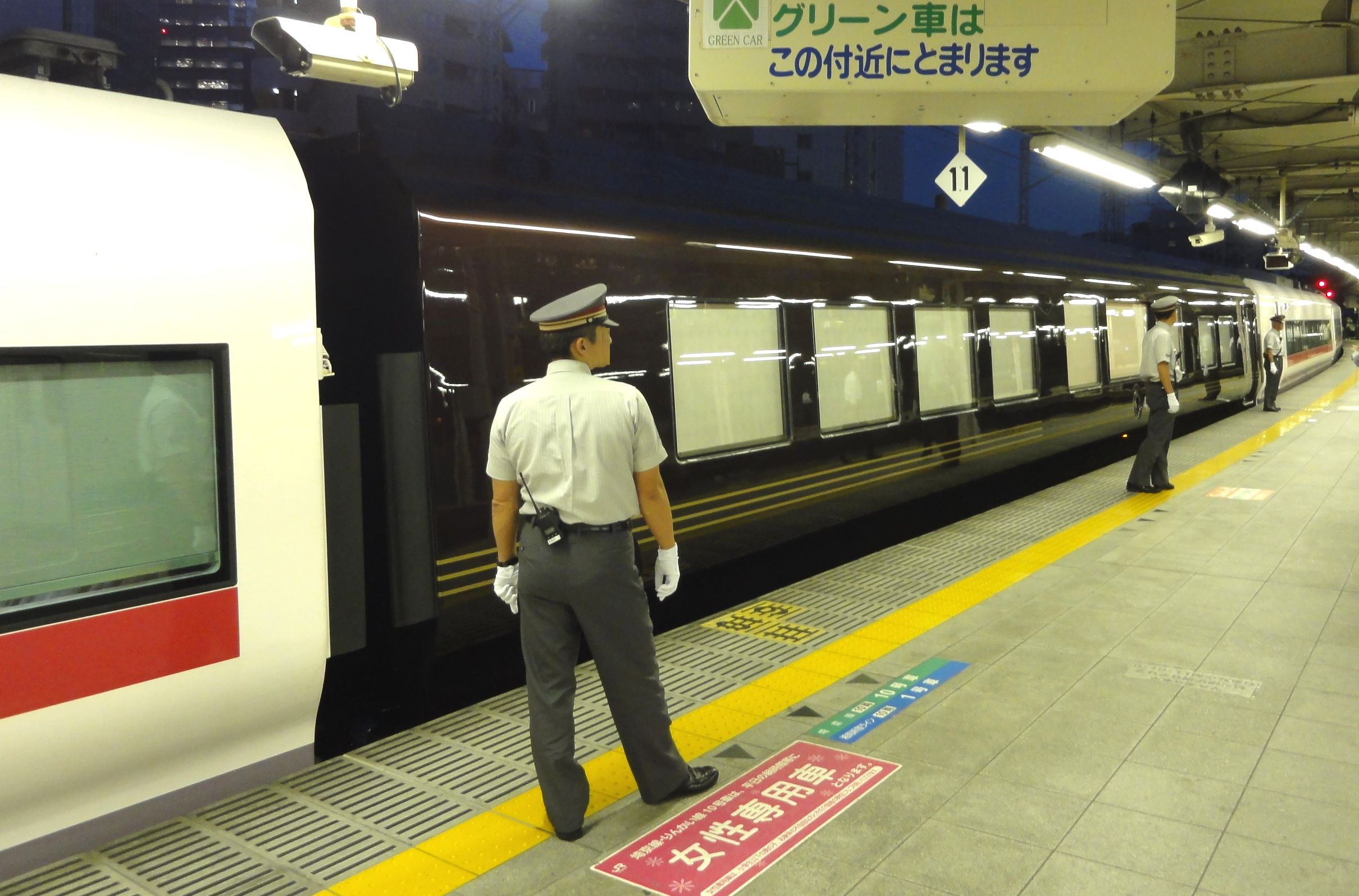
Test running with E655 series "TR" imperial train coach E655-1 sandwiched in E657 series set K-1, September 2011

== Special liveries ==
=== Fresh Hitachi ===
As part of its Ibaraki Destination Campaign which was planned to run between 1 October and 31 December 2023, JR East announced in November 2022 that five E657 series sets would be repainted in the liveries used with the E653 series sets during their use on Fresh Hitachi limited express services. The first set to be repainted, K-17, received the green "green lake" livery and returned to service in December 2022; the second set to be repainted, K-12, received the red "scarlet blossom" livery and returned to service on 12 February 2023; the third set to be repainted, K-2, received the yellow "narcissus" livery and returned to service on 29 April 2023; the fourth set to be repainted, K-1, received the blue "blue ocean" livery and returned to service on 10 June 2023; and the fifth and last set to be repainted, K-3, received the orange "orange persimmon" livery on 27 September 2023.

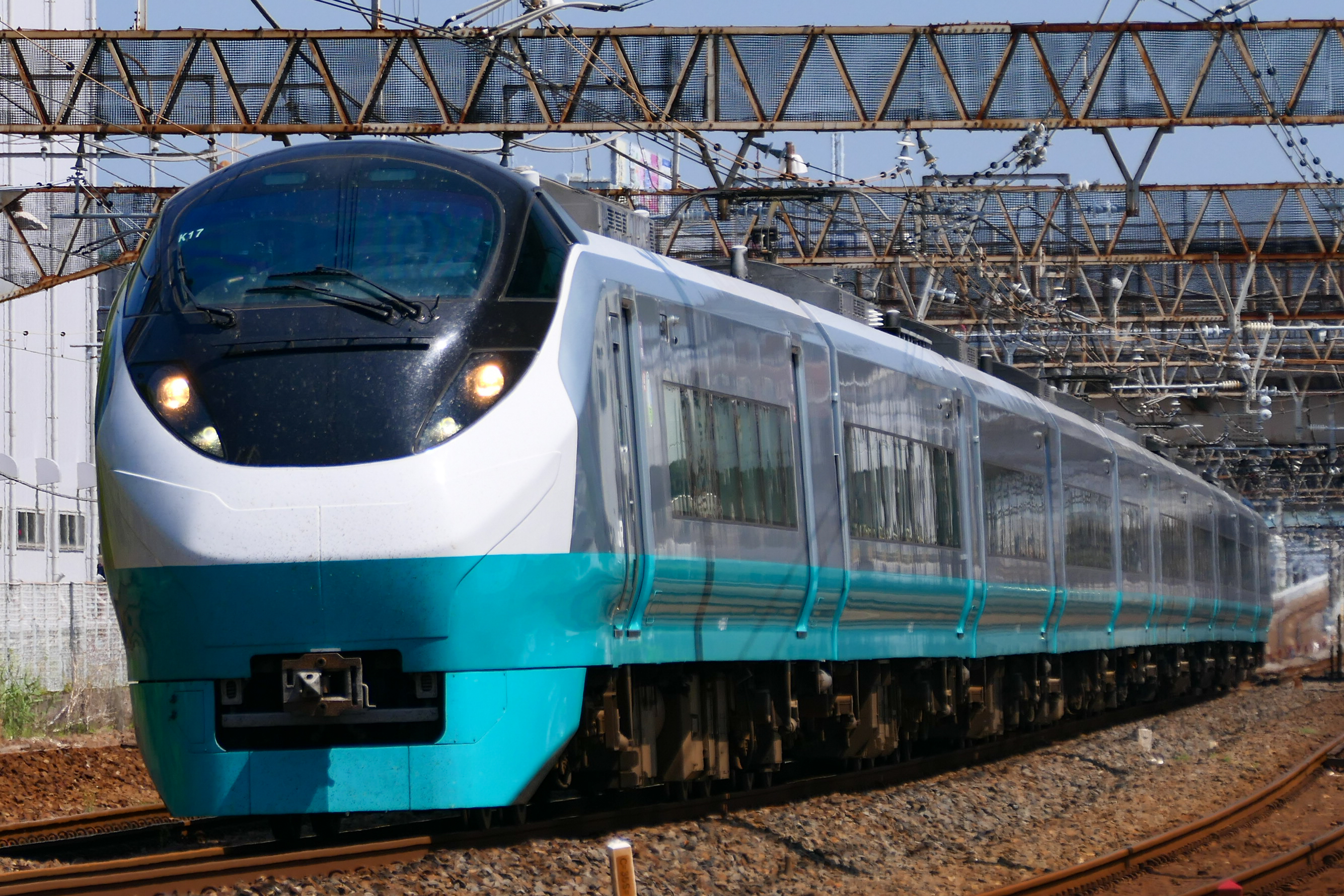
Set K-17 in special green "green lake" livery, May 2023

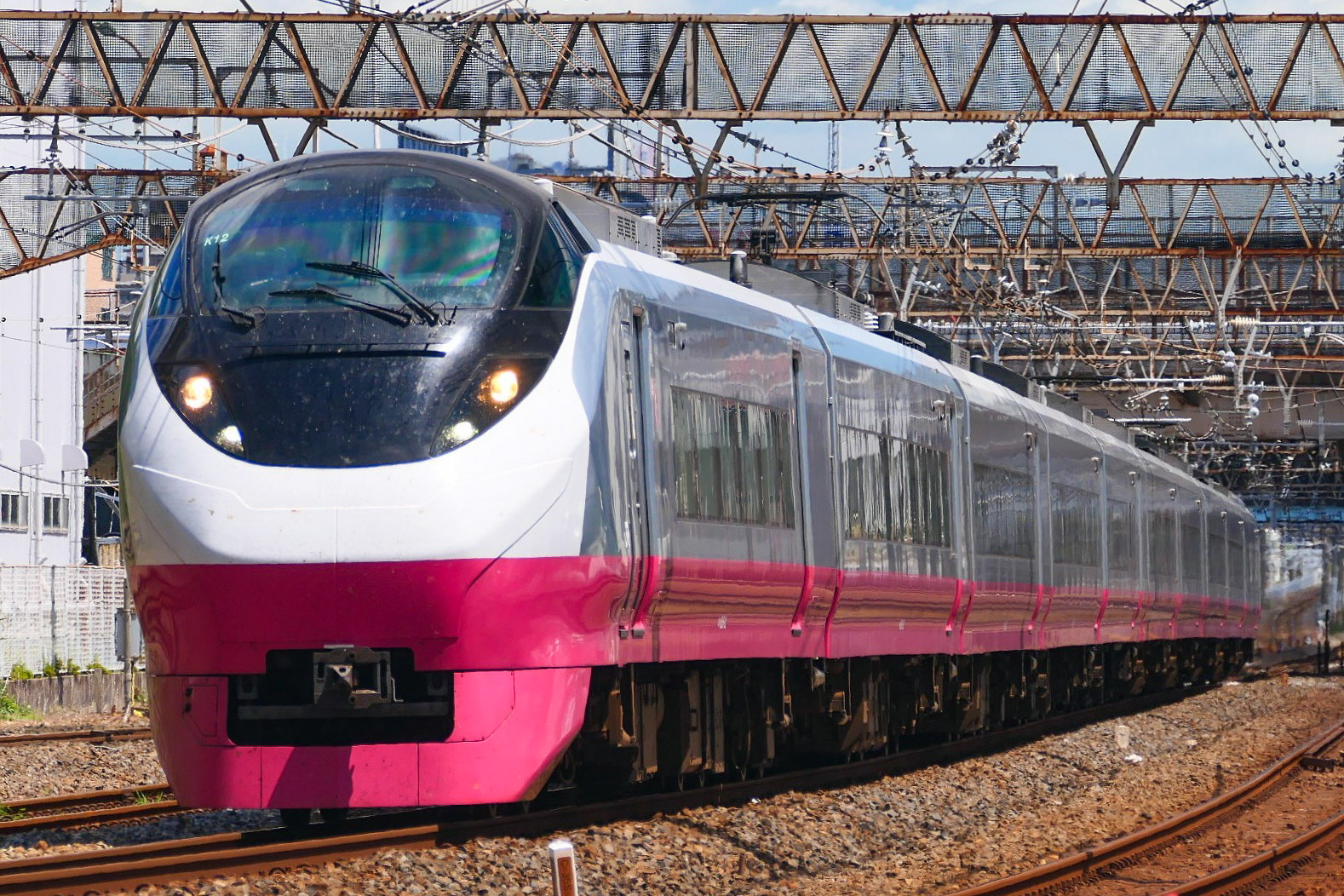
Set K-12 in special red "scarlet blossom" livery, July 2025

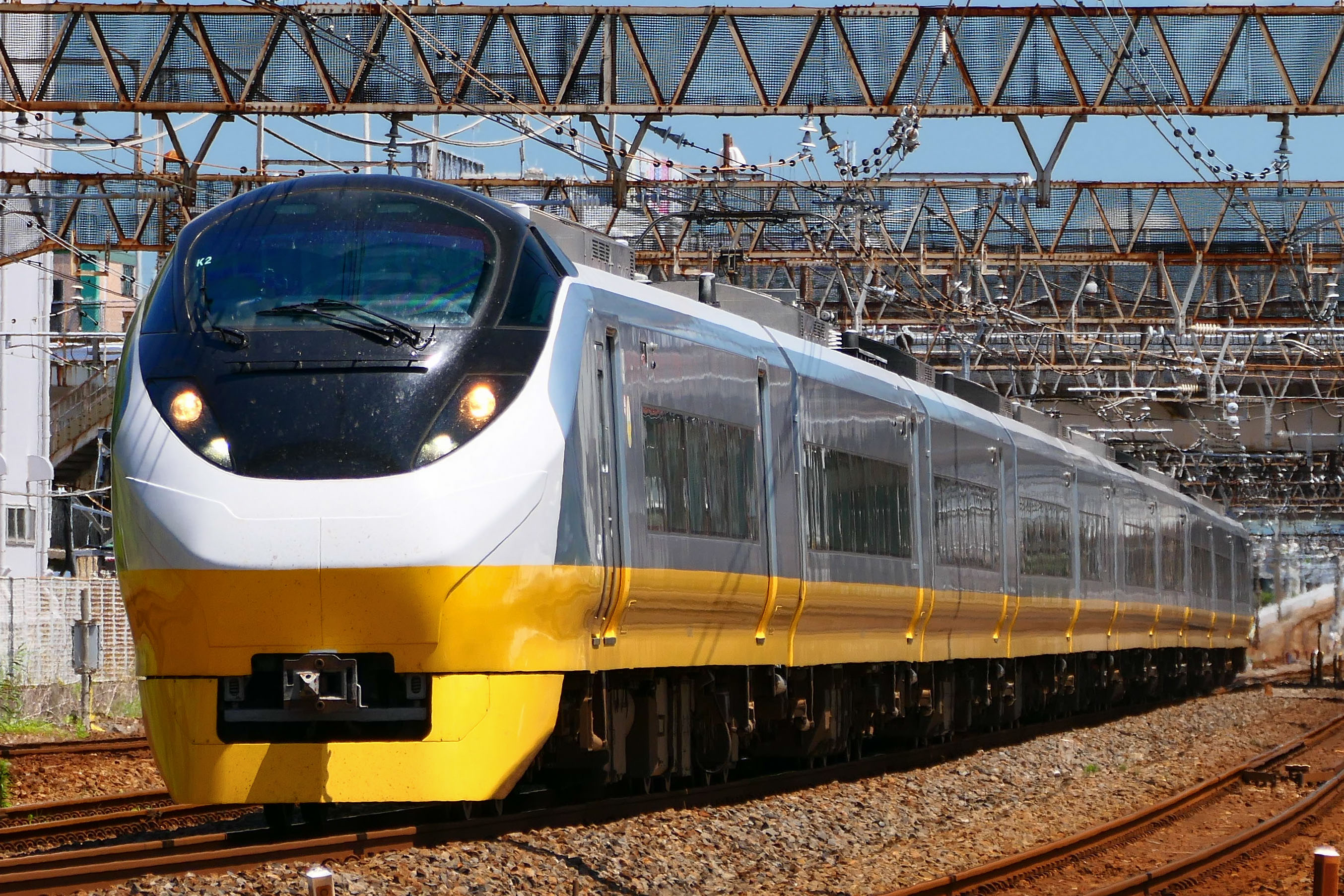
Set K-2 in special yellow "narcissus" livery, July 2023

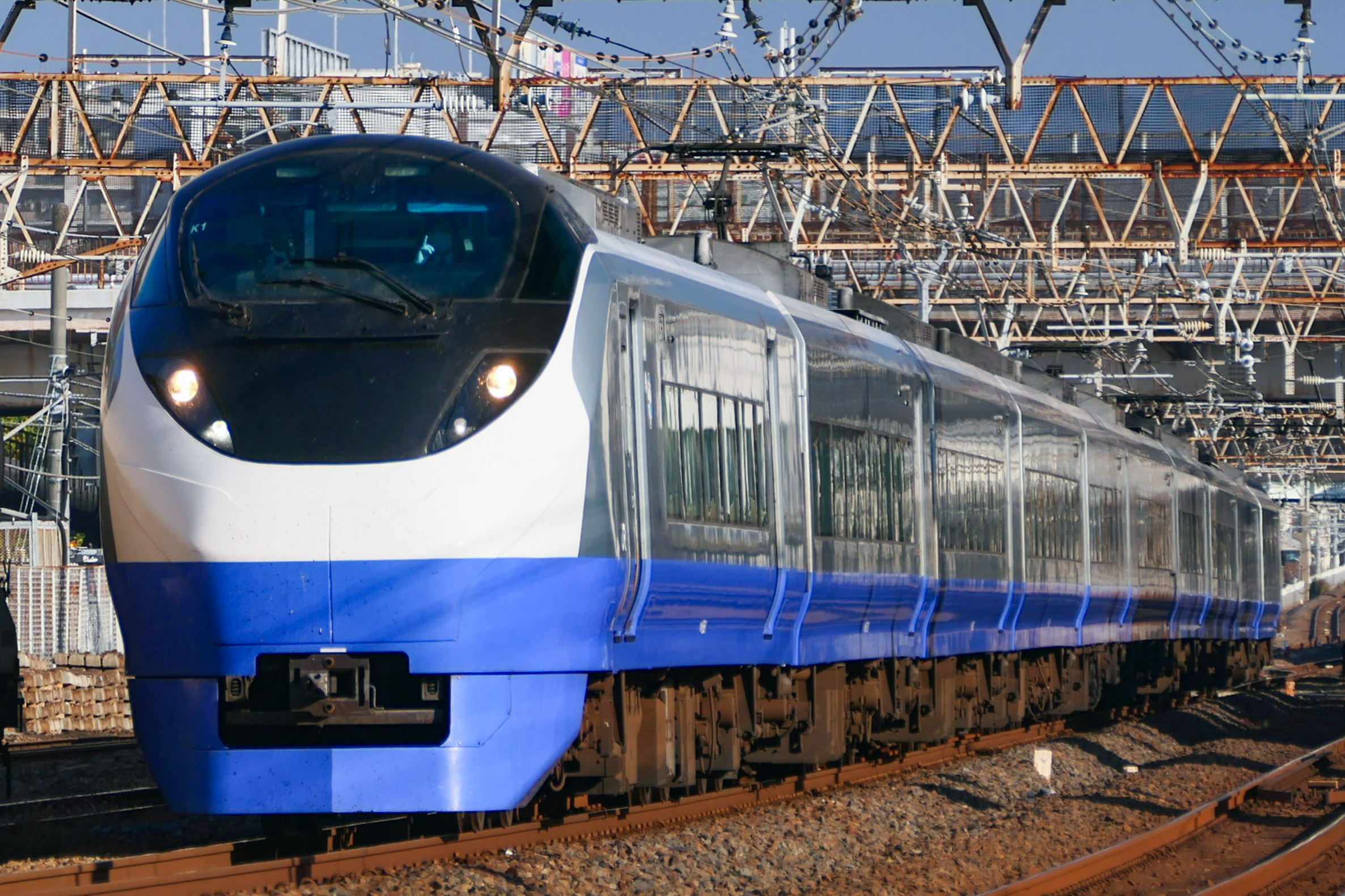
Set K-1 in special blue "blue ocean" livery, November 2025

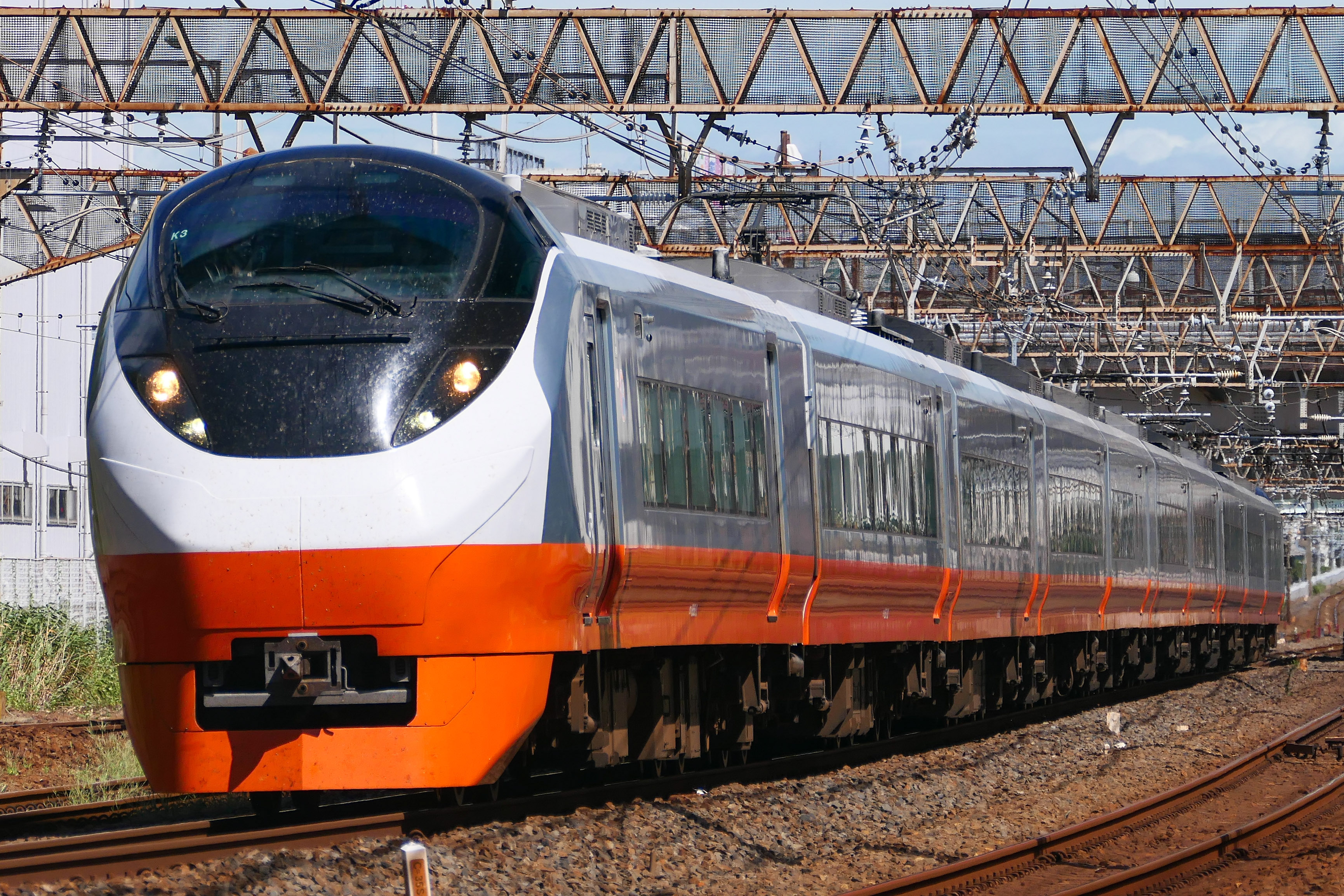
Set K-3 in special orange "orange persimmon" livery, September 2024

== Fleet/build details ==
The manufacturers and delivery dates for the fleet are as shown below.

Set No.	Manufacturer	Date delivered
K-1	Hitachi/Kinki Sharyo	27 May 2011
K-2	Hitachi/Kinki Sharyo	19 October 2011
K-3	Kinki Sharyo	18 November 2011
K-4	Hitachi	23 December 2011
K-5	Kinki Sharyo	19 January 2012
K-6	Hitachi	26 January 2012
K-7	Kinki Sharyo	11 April 2012
K-8	Hitachi	24 February 2012
K-9	J-TREC (Yokohama)	27 August 2012
K-10	J-TREC (Yokohama)	24 September 2012
K-11	J-TREC (Yokohama)	29 October 2012
K-12	Hitachi	21 June 2012
K-13	Kinki Sharyo	10 August 2012
K-14	Kinki Sharyo	7 September 2012
K-15	Kinki Sharyo	12 October 2012
K-16	Kinki Sharyo	18 November 2012
K-17	J-TREC (Yokohama)	5 November 2014
K-18	J-TREC (Yokohama)	13 November 2019
K-19	J-TREC (Yokohama)	12 December 2019
