= E653 series =

Japanese electric multiple unit train type

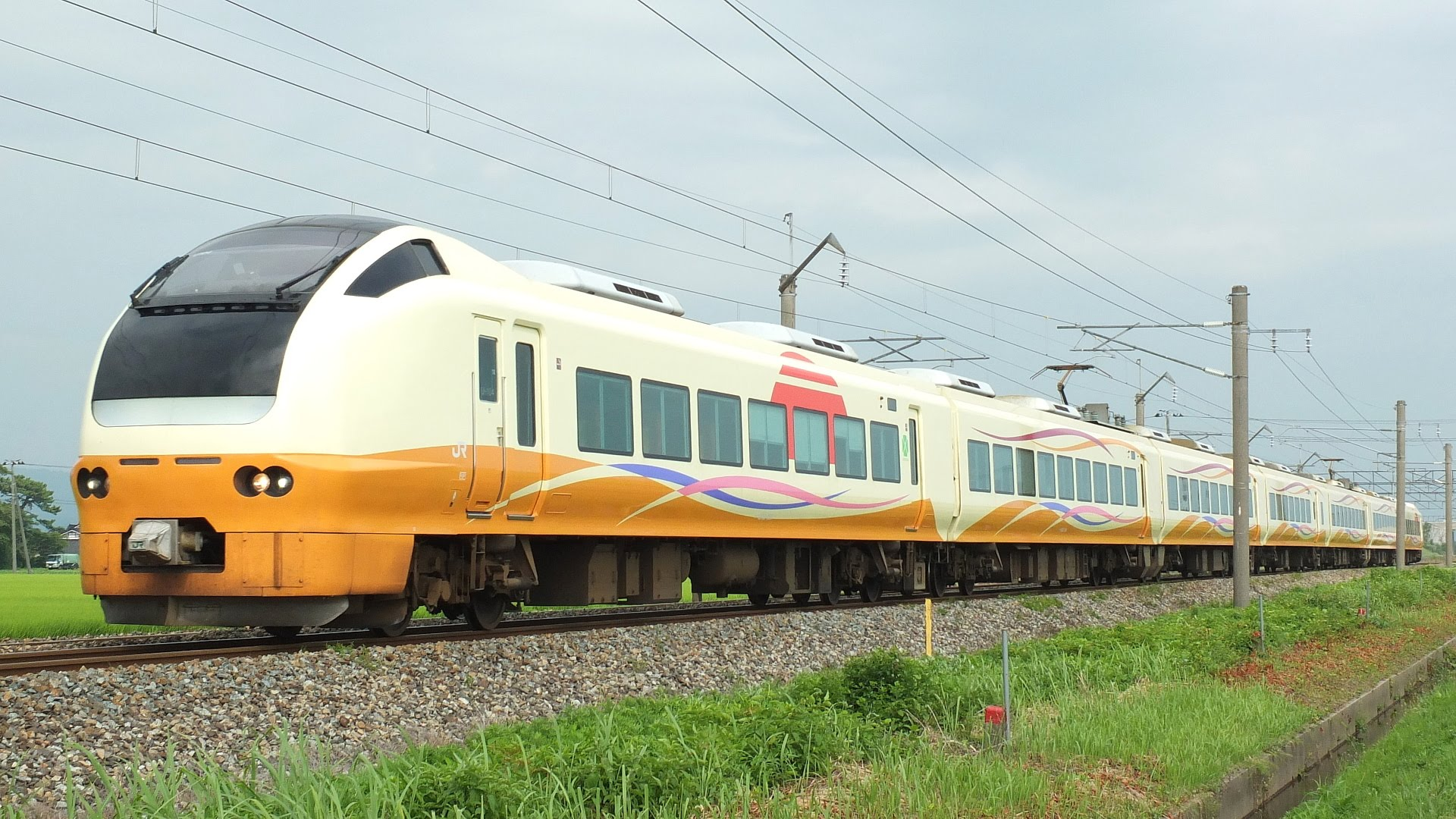
- E653-1000 series EMU set U104 on an Inaho service in July 2014
- In service: 1997–present
- Manufacturers: Kinki Sharyo; Tokyu Car Corporation; Hitachi
- Replaced: 485 series
- Constructed: 1997–2005
- Entered service: 1 October 1997
- Number built: 72 vehicles (12 sets)
- Number in service: 72 vehicles (12 sets)
- Successor: E657 series
- Formation: 4/7 cars per trainset
- Fleet numbers: U101, U103–U107, H201–H204, K70, K71
- Operator: JR East
- Depots: Niigata; Katsuta

Specifications
- Car body construction: Aluminium
- Car length: 21.5 m (70 ft 6 in) (end cars); 20.5 m (67 ft 3 in) (intermediate cars)
- Width: 2,946 mm (9 ft 8 in)
- Doors: One per side
- Maximum speed: 130 km/h (81 mph)
- Traction system: Variable frequency (IGBT)
- Electric system: 1,500 V DC / 20 kV AC (50/60 Hz)
- Current collection: Overhead catenary
- Bogies: DT64 (motored), TR249 (trailer)
- Safety systems: ATS-P, ATS-Ps
- Track gauge: 1,067 mm (3 ft 6 in)

The E653 series (E653系) is an AC/DC dual-voltage electric multiple unit (EMU) train type operated by East Japan Railway Company (JR East) in Japan on limited express services since 1997. Originally used on Joban Line Fresh Hitachi limited express services between Ueno in Tokyo and Iwaki, they were reallocated to Niigata for use on Inaho limited express services from 2013 and on Shirayuki limited express services from 2015.

== Variants ==
- E653-0 series: Original (eight 7-car and four 4-car) AC/DC sets built from 1997 for use on Joban Line Fresh Hitachi limited express services
- E653-1000 series: 7-car sets modified from E653-0 series between 2013 and 2014 for use on Inaho limited express services from September 2013
- E653-1100 series: 4-car sets modified from E653-0 series between 2014 and 2015 for use on Shirayuki limited express services from March 2015 and on Inaho services from March 2022

== Operations ==
=== 1997–2013 Fresh Hitachi ===
From their introduction in 1997, the E653 series trains operated on Fresh Hitachi limited express services between Ueno in Tokyo and Iwaki via the Joban Line as seven-, seven + four-, and seven + seven-car formations, but were withdrawn from regular scheduled services from the start of the revised timetable on 16 March 2013.

=== 2013- Inaho ===
From the start of the revised timetable on 28 September 2013, reformed E653 series sets displaced from Fresh Hitachi services by new E657 series sets were phased in on Inaho services operating between Niigata and Akita, replacing JNR-era 485 series EMUs and reclassified E653-1000 series. The Inaho fleet consists of eight seven-car E653-1000 series sets modified with the addition of a Green (first class) car and a new livery evoking images of the sunset, rice plants, and the sea.

From the start of the timetable revision on 12 March 2022, four-car E653-1100 series sets began operating on Inaho services.

=== 2015– Shirayuki ===
From the start of the revised timetable on 14 March 2015, four-car E653-1100 series sets were introduced on new Shirayuki limited express services operating between Niigata and Arai.

== Formations ==
As of 1 April 2017, the fleet consists of eight seven-car sets (U101 to U108) and four four-car sets (H201 to H204), all based at Niigata Depot.

=== Inaho E653-1000 series 7-car sets U101–U108 ===
The reformed seven-car Inaho E653-1000 series sets (U101 to U108) are based at Niigata Depot and formed as follows, with four motored ("M") cars and three non-powered trailer ("T") cars, and car 1 at the Akita (northern) end.

Car No.	1	2	3	4	5	6	7
Designation	Tsc'	M1	M2	T	M1	M2	Tc
Numbering	KuRo E652-100x	MoHa E653-10xx	MoHa E652-10xx	SaHa E653-100x	MoHa E653-10xx	MoHa E652-10xx	KuHa E653-100x

- Cars 2 and 5 each have one PS32 single-arm pantograph.
- Cars 1, 3, 4, and 6 have toilets.

=== Inaho / Shirayuki E653-1100 series 4-car sets H201–H204 ===
The reformed four-car Inaho and Shirayuki E653-1100 series sets (H201 to H204) are formed as follows, with two motored ("M") cars and two non-powered trailer ("T") cars, and car 1 at the Arai end.

Car No.	1	2	3	4
Designation	T'c	M1	M2	Tc
Numbering	KuHa E652-110x	MoHa E653-110x	MoHa E652-110x	KuHa E653-110x

Car 2 is equipped with one PS32 single-arm pantograph.

=== Original (Fresh Hitachi) 7-car sets K301–K308 ===
The original Fresh Hitachi seven-car sets were formed as follows, with car 1 at the south (Ueno) end.

Car No.	1	2	3	4	5	6	7
Designation	T'c	M1	M2	T	M1	M2	Tc
Numbering	KuHa E652	MoHa E653	MoHa E652	SaHa E653	MoHa E653	MoHa E652	KuHa E653

- Cars 2 and 5 each had one PS32 single-arm pantograph.
- Cars 1, 3, 4, and 6 had toilets.

=== Original (Fresh Hitachi) 4-car sets K351–K354 ===
The original Fresh Hitachi four-car sets were formed as follows, with car 8 at the south (Ueno) end.

Car No.	8	9	10	11
Designation	T'c	M1	M2	Tc
Numbering	KuHa E652-100	MoHa E653	MoHa E652	KuHa E653-100

Car 9 was equipped with one PS32 single-arm pantograph.

== Interior ==
=== E653-0 series ===
All cars in the original E653-0 series sets were standard class with 2+2 seating and 910 mm (36 in) seat pitch.

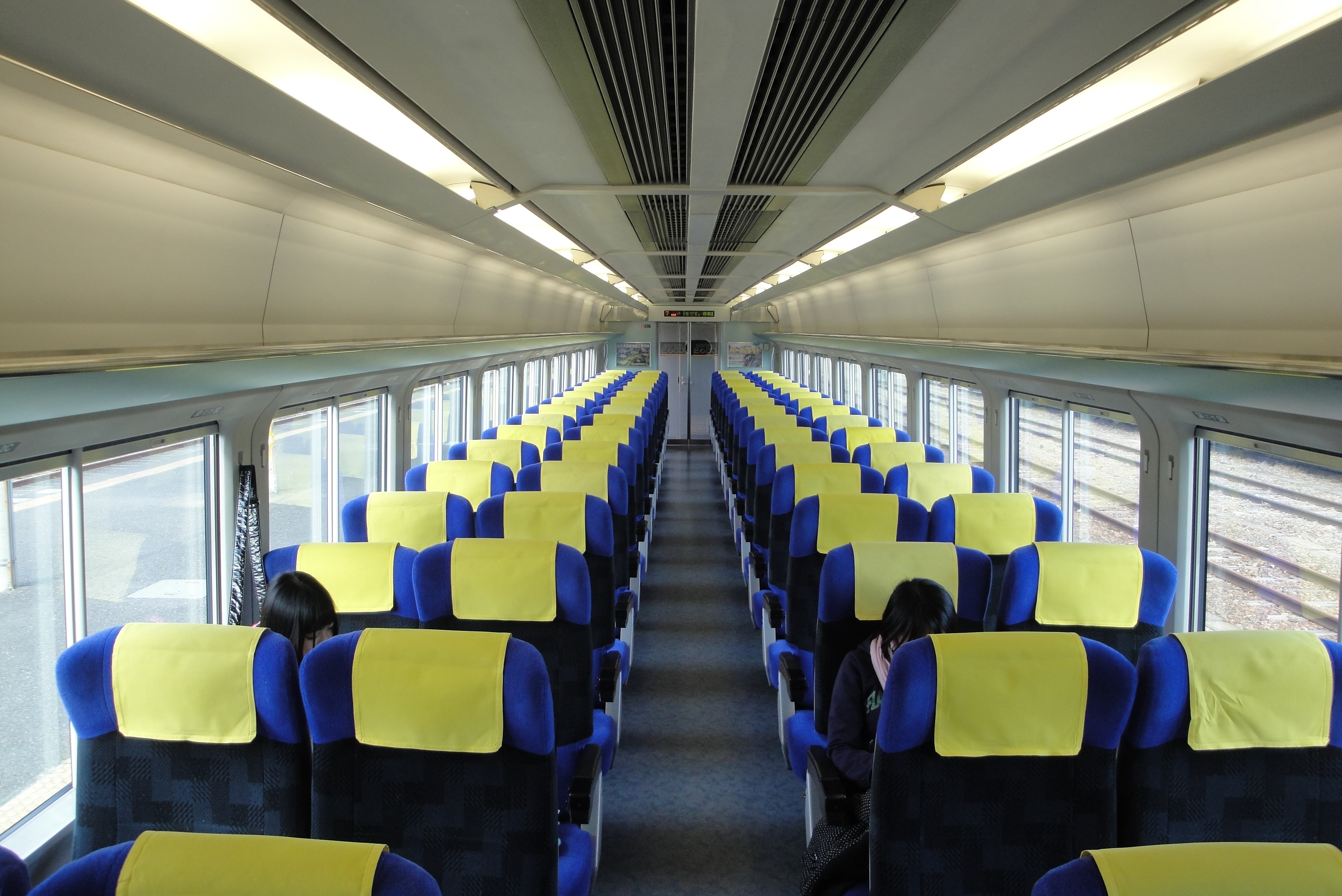
Original E653 series interior view (standard class) in January 2010

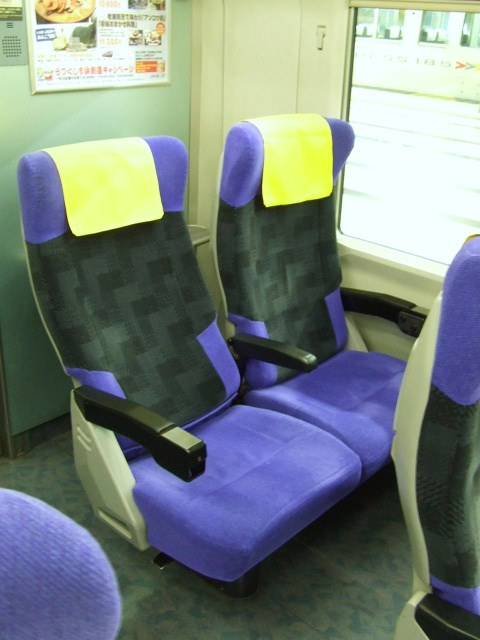
Original E653 series standard class seating

=== E653-1000 series ===
The Green (first class) cars in E653-1000 series sets have 2+1 seating, arranged with pairs of seats on the seaward side and single seats on the landward side. Seat rows are aligned with the windows, giving a seat pitch of 1,820 mm (72 in), double that for standard class, and additional privacy is added by partitions between each seat row. The Green car seats 18 passengers.

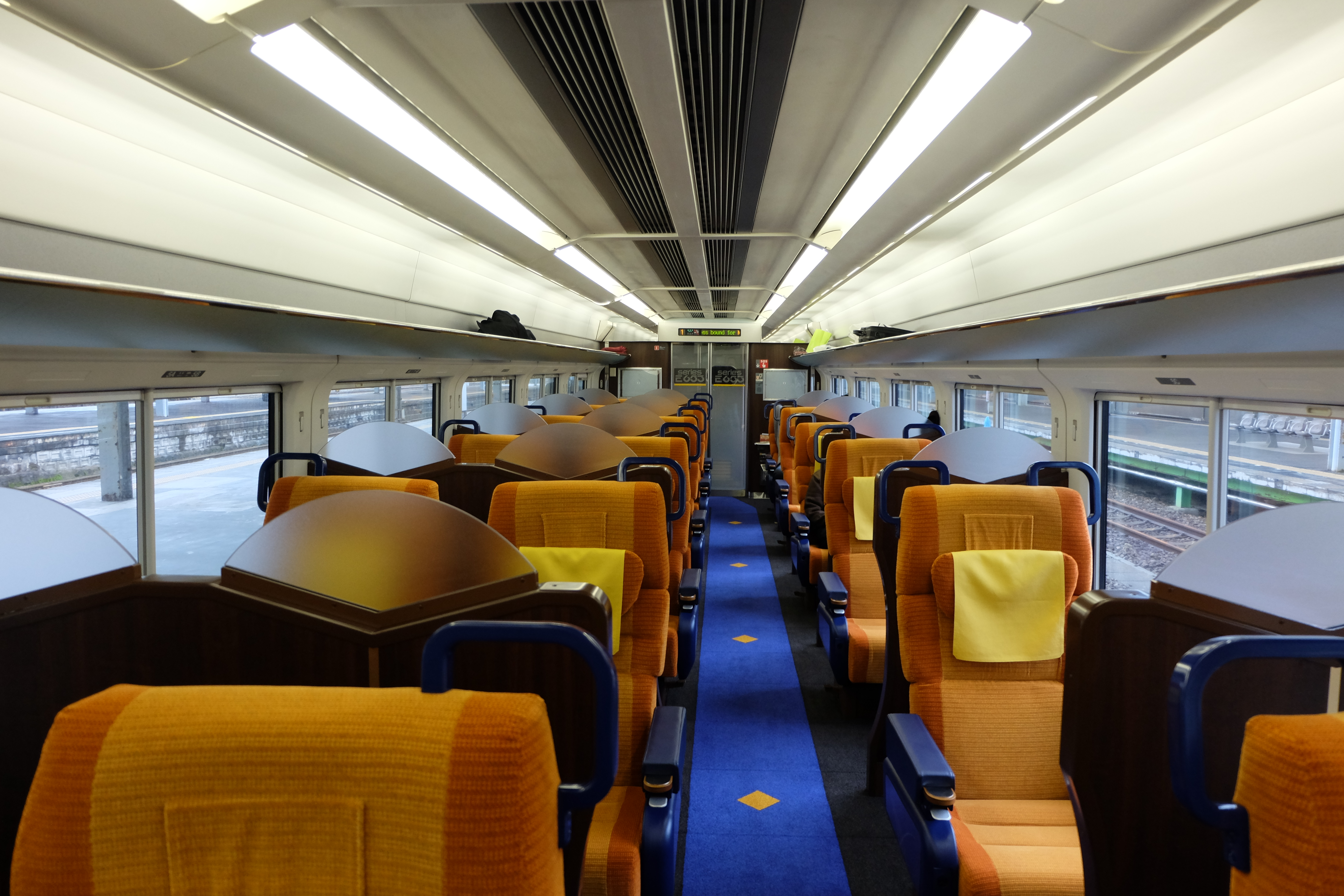
The interior of an E653-1000 series Green car

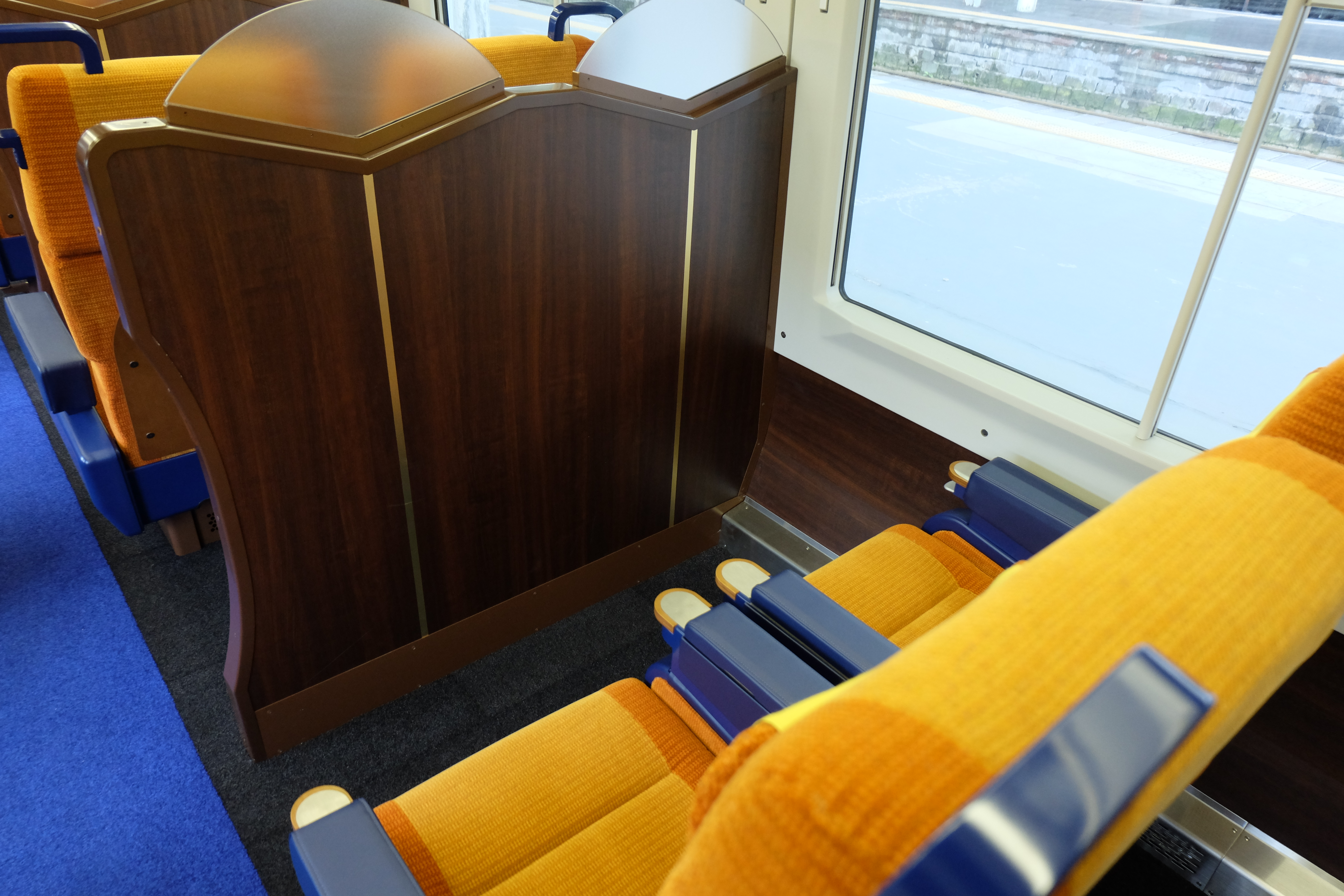
Green car seating

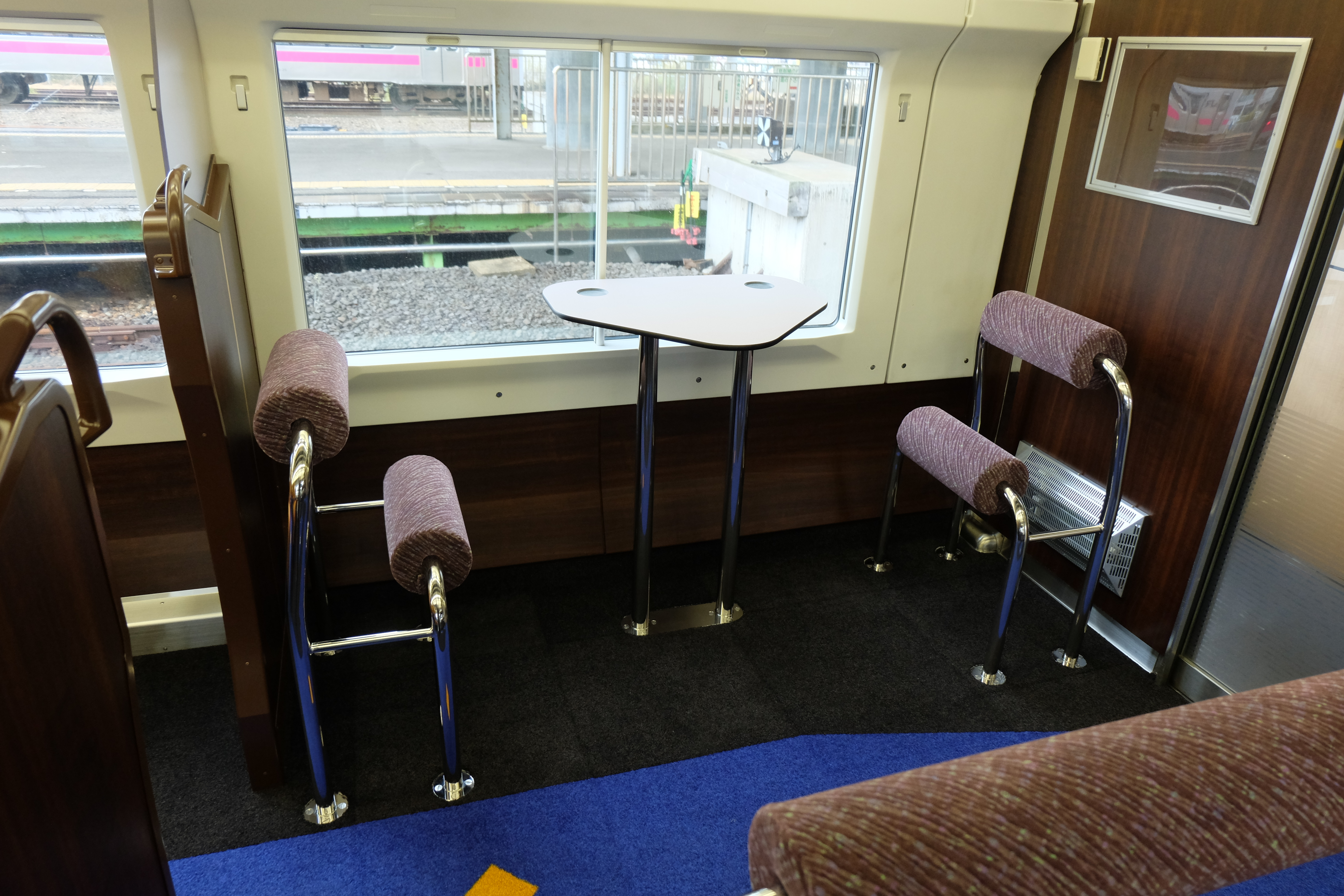
The mini-lounge area in a Green car

== History ==
E653 series were introduced from 1 October 1997. The refreshment vending machines were discontinued from 31 March 2008.

From 17 March 2012, the E653 series trains were gradually phased out from Fresh Hitachi services with the introduction of new E657 series ten-car EMUs. Original plans were for some E653 series sets to be reassigned to new limited express services operating on the Jōban Line between Iwaki and Sendai, with three four-car sets due to be repainted into a new "hamakaidō" (浜街道, coastway) blue livery for use on services between Iwaki and Sendai and the rest of the fleet transferred elsewhere. These plans were abandoned following the suspension of services north of Iwaki on the Joban Line after the 2011 Tohoku earthquake and tsunami.

From the start of the revised timetable on 28 September 2013, reformed E653-1000 series seven-car sets were introduced on Inaho services, operating between Niigata and Akita. Set U102 was the first E653-1000 series to enter revenue service, being used on a special E653 Series Uetsu Line Debut (E653系羽越線デビュー号) charter service between Niigata and Sakata on 14 September 2013.

The sub-fleet of four four-car sets were renumbered as E653-1100 series sets for use on new Shirayuki limited express services operating between Niigata and Arai from the start of the revised timetable on 14 March 2015. These sets received a new livery consisting of ivory white with vermillion and blue stripes intended to evoke an image of the sunset over the Sea of Japan. The interiors were refitted with new seat covers, similar to those used in the E7 series and W7 series shinkansen trains.

=== E653 series livery changes ===
The fleet of E653-1000 series sets used on Inaho services is undergoing a programme of reliverying beginning in 2017, with sets each receiving different colour liveries. Set U106 received an all-over ultramarine livery, returning to service in October 2017, and set U107 received an all-over deep pink (Japanese rose (ハマナス, hamanasu)) livery, returning to service in December 2017.

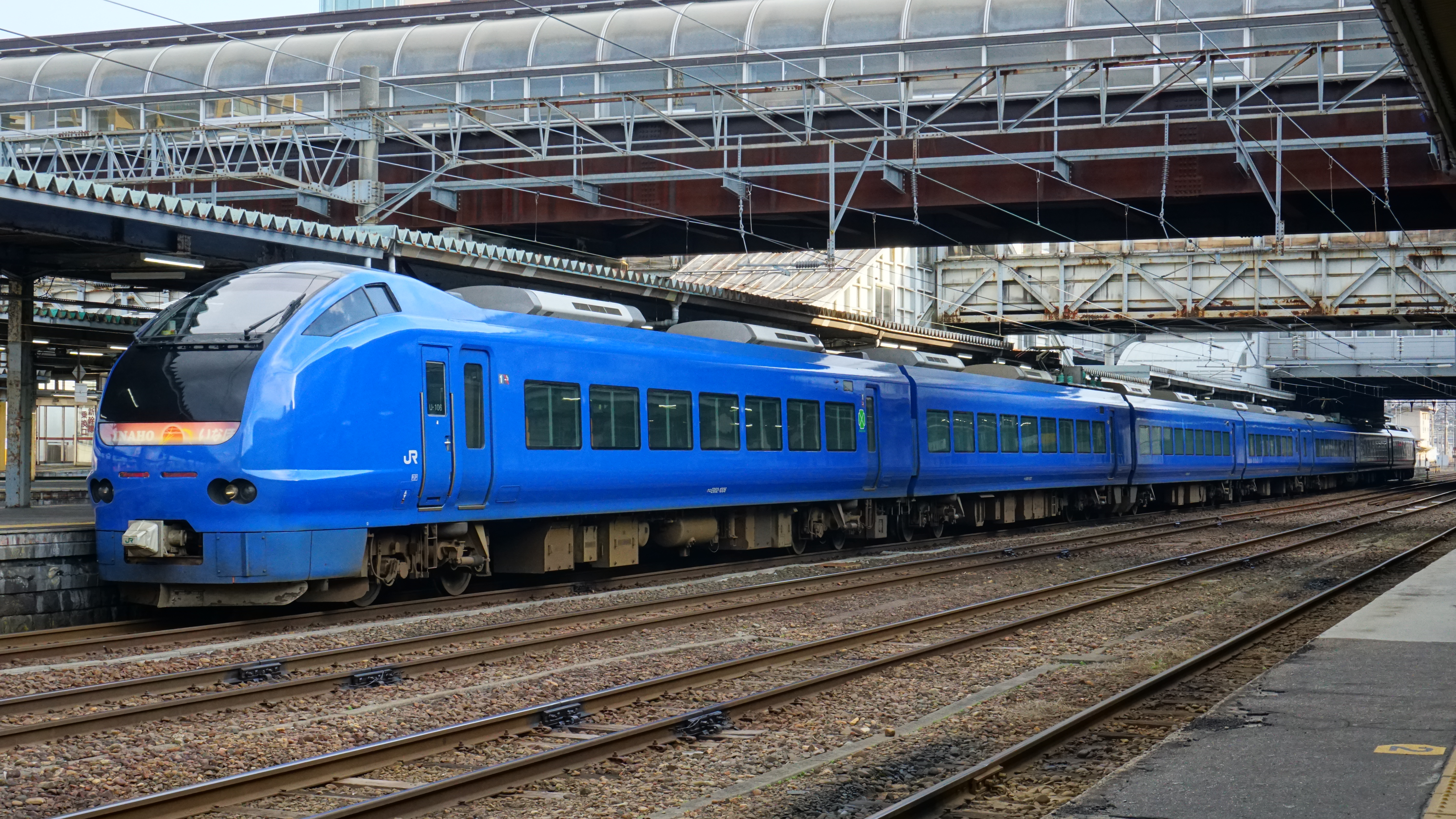
Set U106 in ultramarine livery in March 2019

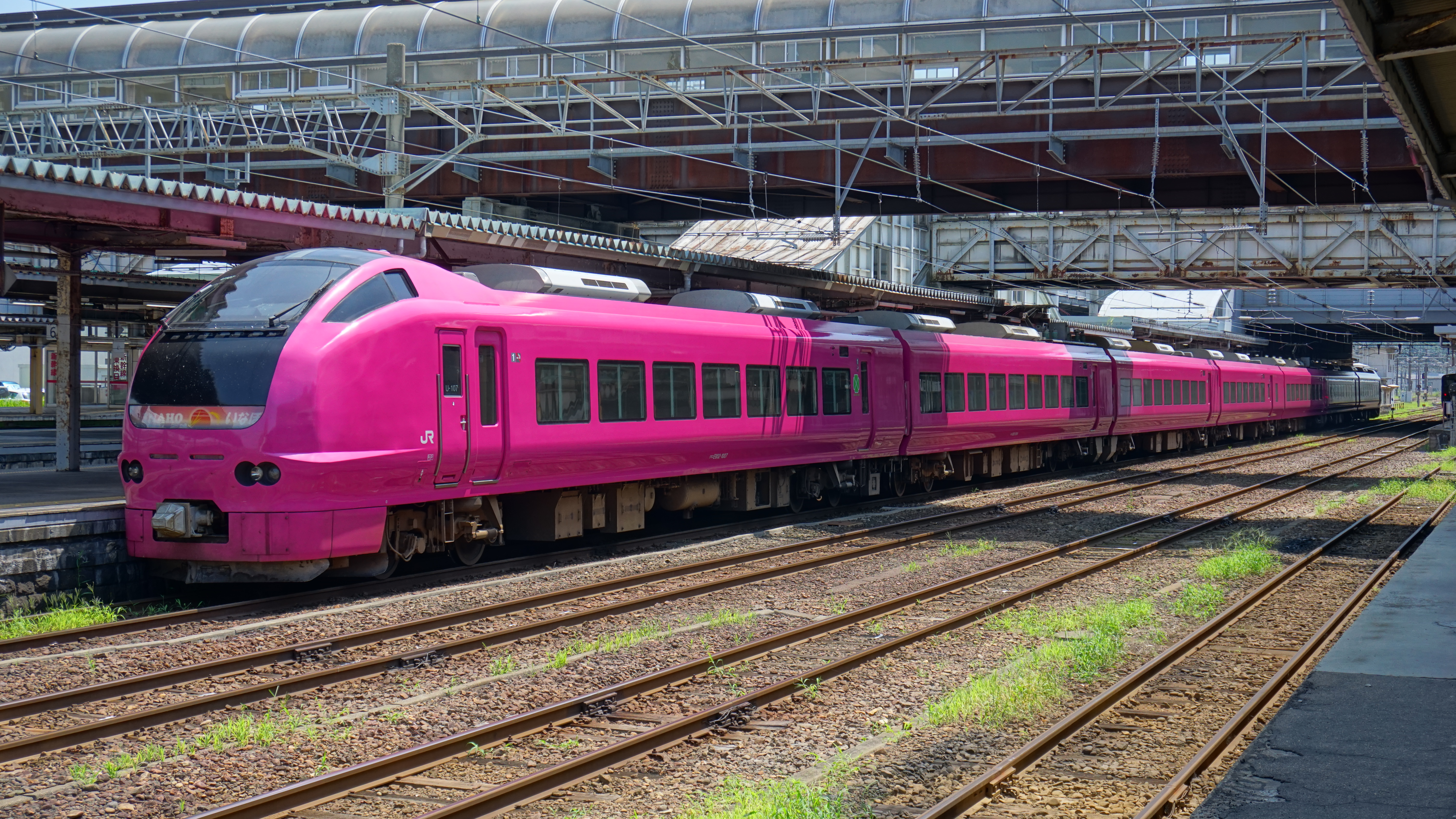
Set U107 in deep-pink livery in August 2019

On 19 October 2018, JR East announced that one E653-1000 series seven-car set would be reliveried to the Japanese National Railways limited express livery 485 series trains previously used on Hitachi limited express services. The set involved was U108, which completed conversion and repainting work on 7 November 2018 and was subsequently renumbered as set K70 upon transfer to Katsuta Depot. This set returned to service on 2 February 2019 on a charter service between Mito and Iwaki stations on the Jōban Line.

On 4 August 2023, JR East announced that one more seven-car set would be repainted into a light blue Fresh Hitachi livery and be used for special services primarily in the Greater Tokyo area. Set U102 received the new livery and was transferred to Katsuta Depot as set K71. It re-entered service on 14 October 2023.

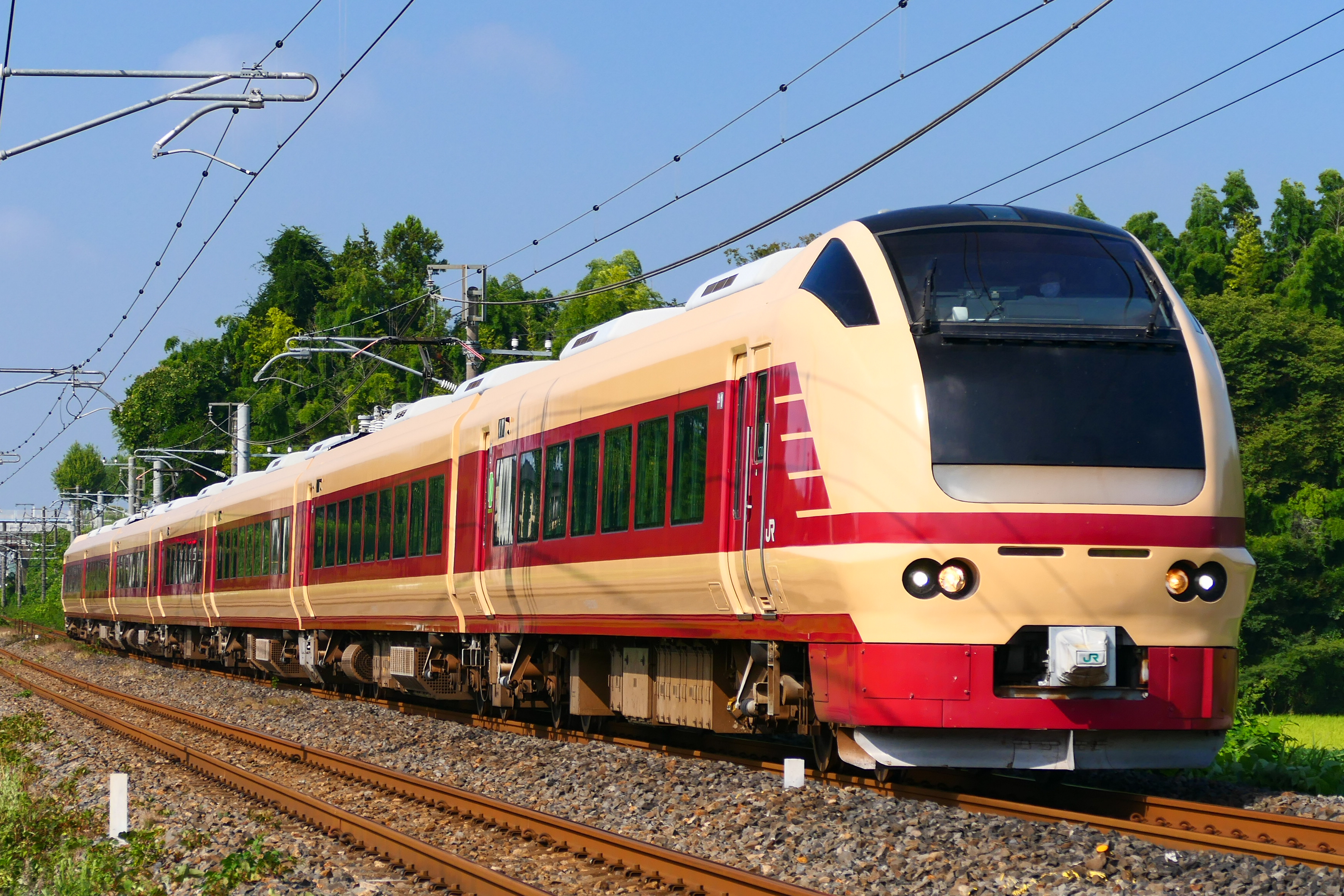
Set K70 (formerly U108) in JNR limited express livery in August 2023

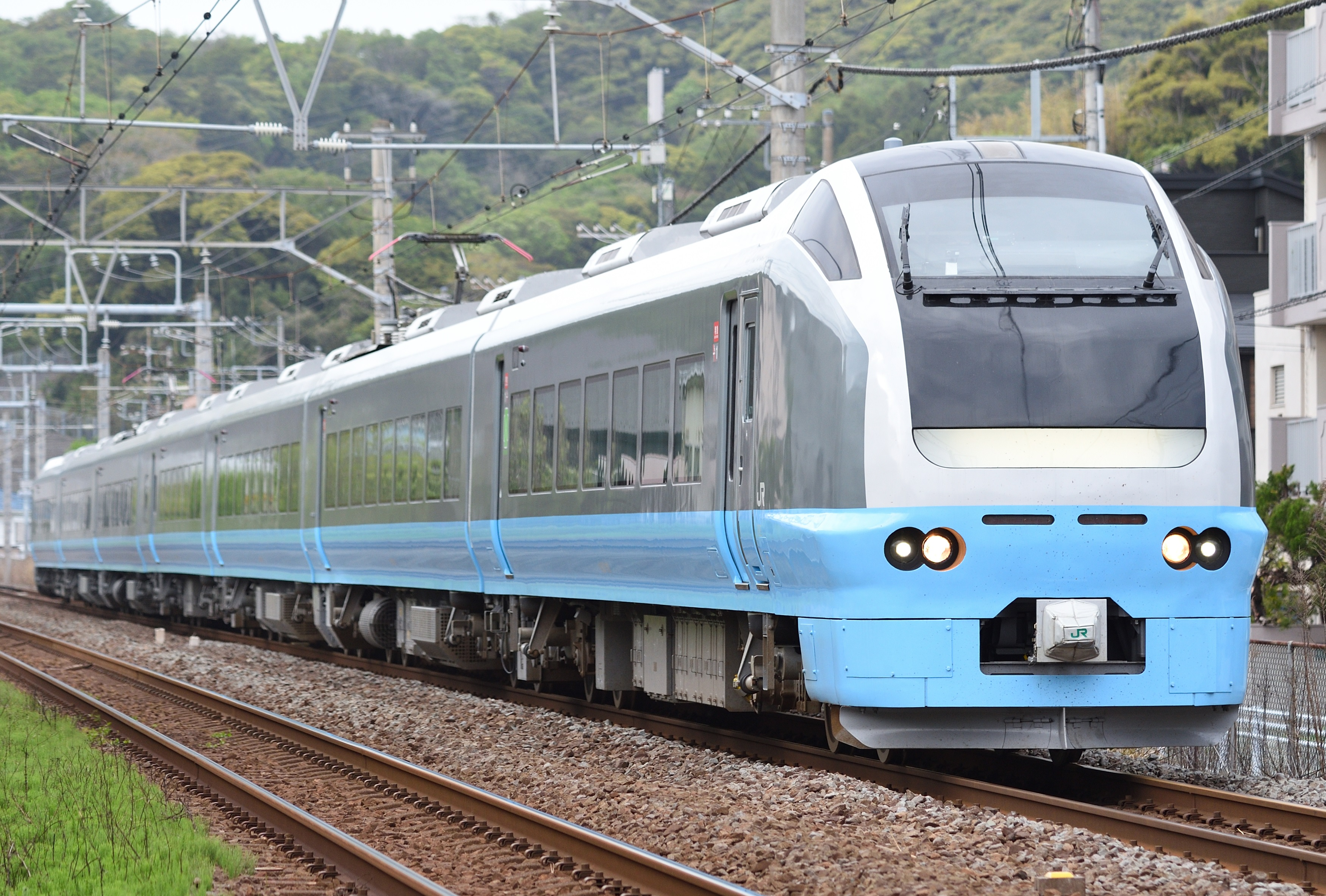
Set K71 (formerly U102) in light blue Fresh Hitachi livery in April 2024

To commemorate the 120th anniversary of Niigata Station in May 2024 and the 100th anniversary of the full opening of the Uetsu Main Line in July of the same year, E653-1100 series set H202 was repainted in the Kaminuttari livery used by 485 series trains formerly operated in the Niigata area, returning to service on 21 April 2024.

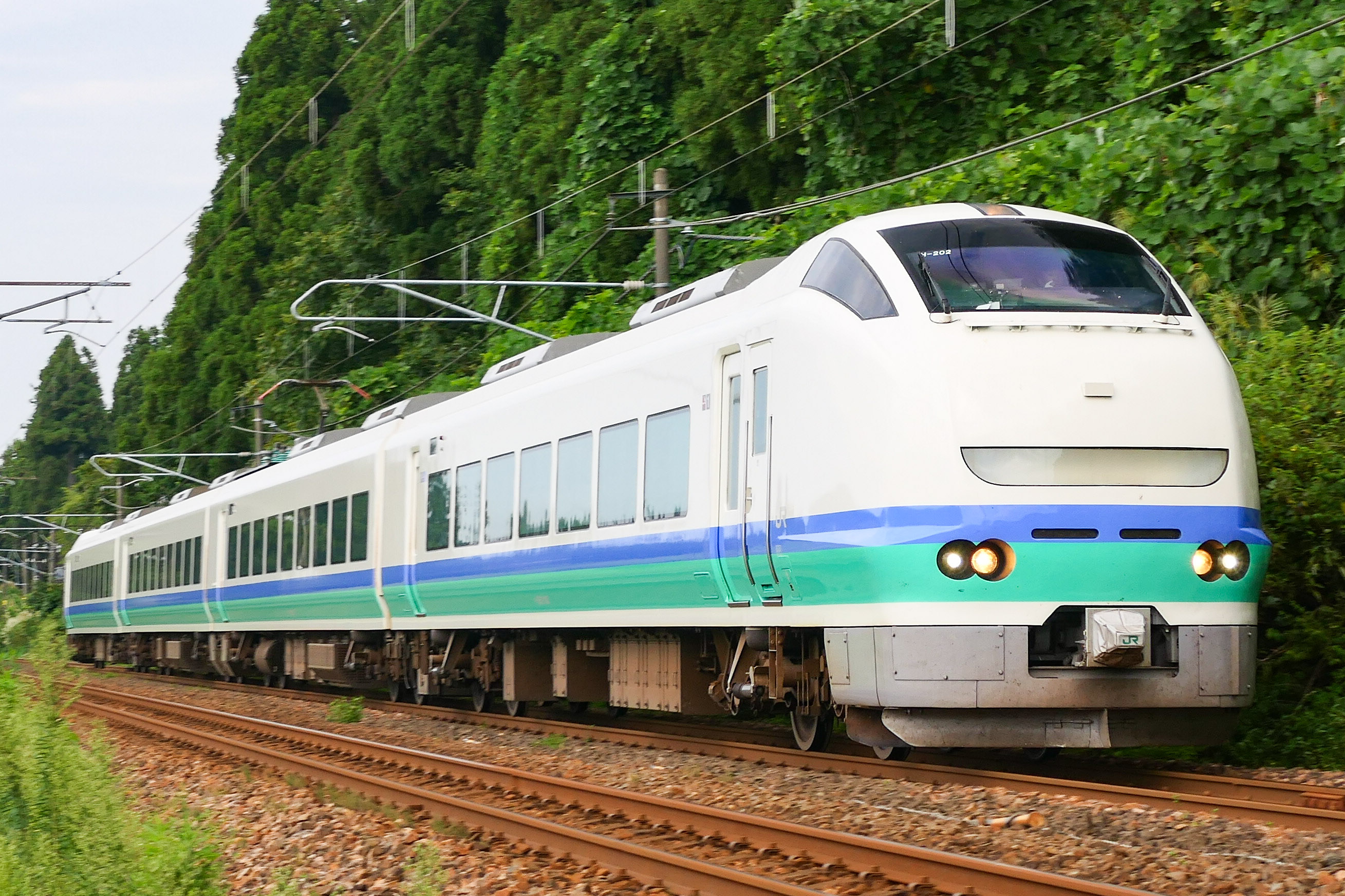
Set H202 in Kaminuttari livery in September 2024

== Fleet histories ==
The manufacturers and build dates for the fleet are as shown below.

=== 7-car sets ===
Set No.	Original set No.	Delivered	Manufacturer	Original colour	1000 subseries conversion date	Notes
U101	K301	22 July 1997	Hitachi	Red	25 June 2013	
K71	K302 (1997–2013); U102 (2013–2023)	4 August 1997	Hitachi	Blue	28 August 2013	Reliveried in light blue Fresh Hitachi livery in 2023
U103	K303	7 August 1997	Kinki Sharyo	Yellow	31 October 2013	
U104	K304	26 August 1997	Tokyu Car	Green	9 January 2014	
U105	K305	4 November 1998	Hitachi	Red	18 March 2014	
U106	K306	18 November 1998	Kinki Sharyo	Yellow	19 June 2014	Reliveried in all-over ultramarine in October 2017.
U107	K307	24 November 1998	Tokyu Car	Green	1 September 2014	Reliveried in all-over deep-pink in December 2017.
K70	K308/K354 (until 2015); U108 (2015–2018)	24 November 1998 (K308); 27 February 2005 (K354)	Hitachi	Blue	26 March 2015	Reformed from 4 cars of former set K354 and 3 intermediate cars (4–6) of former set K308. Relivered in JNR limited express livery in November 2018.

=== 4-car sets ===
Set No.	Original set No.	Delivered	Manufacturer	Original colour	1100 subseries conversion date	Notes
H201	K351	18 November 1998	Kinki Sharyo	Orange	26 February 2015	
H202	K352	24 November 1998	Tokyu Car	Orange	26 February 2015	Reliveried in Kaminuttari livery in April 2024
H203	K353	25 November 1998	Hitachi	Orange	4 March 2015	
H204	K308	25 November 1998	Hitachi	Orange	26 February 2015	Formed from cars 1–3 and 7 of former set K308

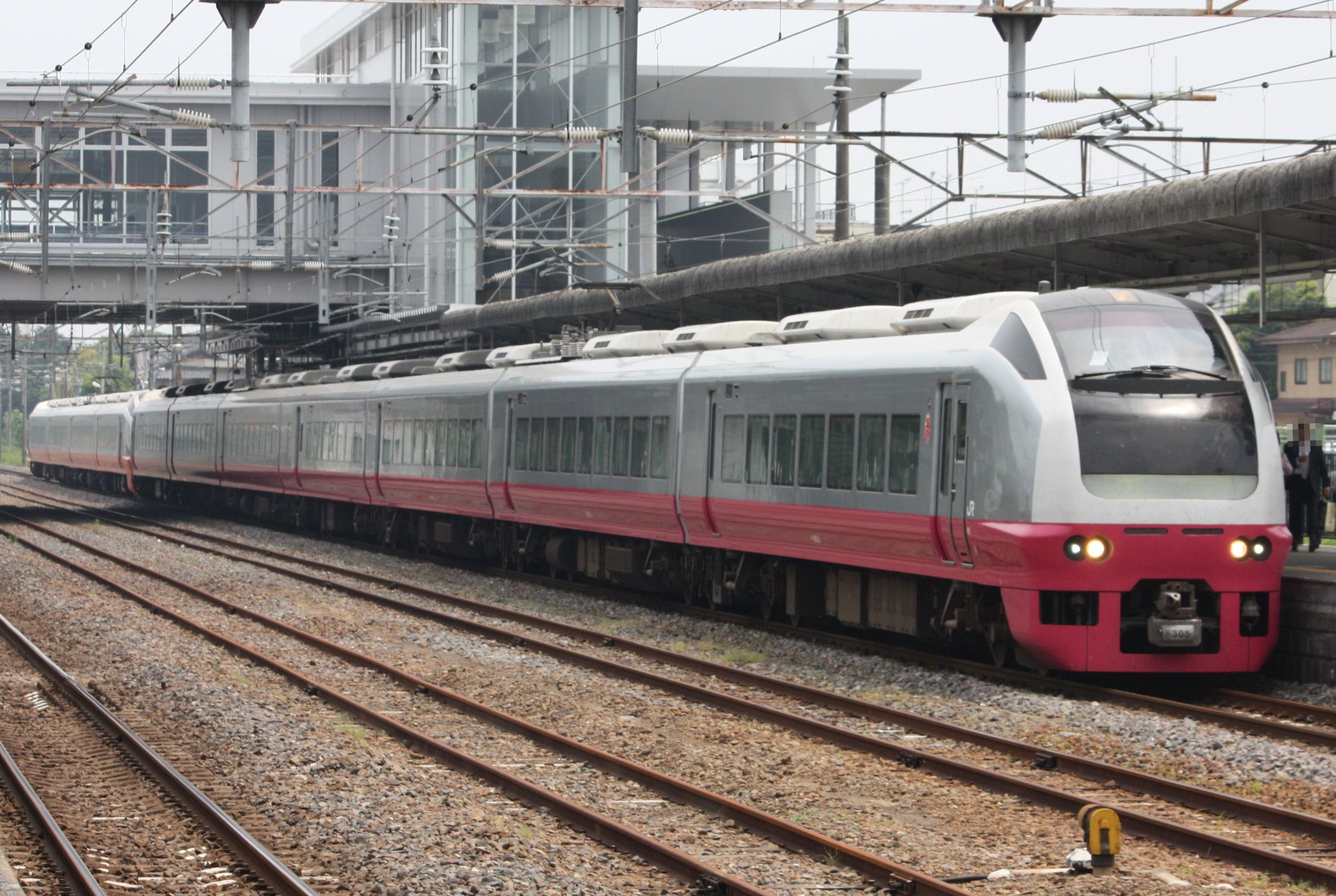
Red livery 7-car set K305 in May 2008

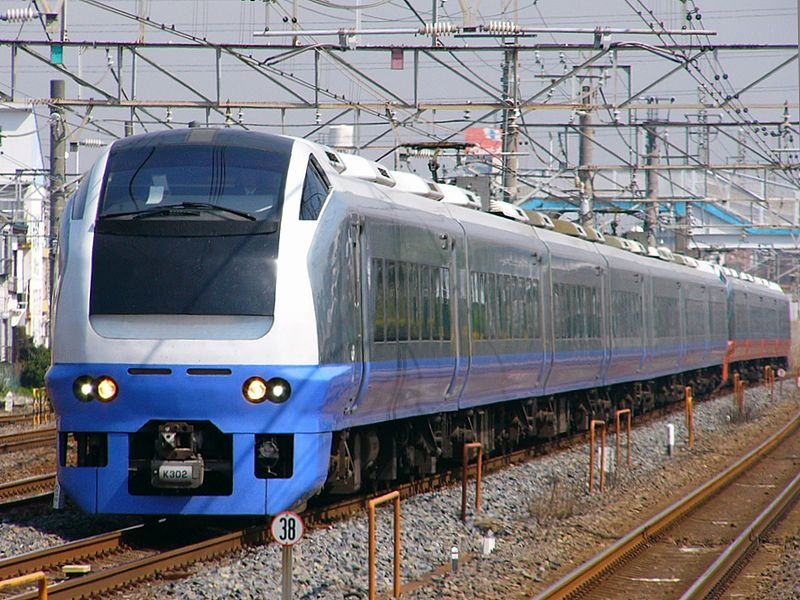
Blue livery 7-car set K302 in April 2003

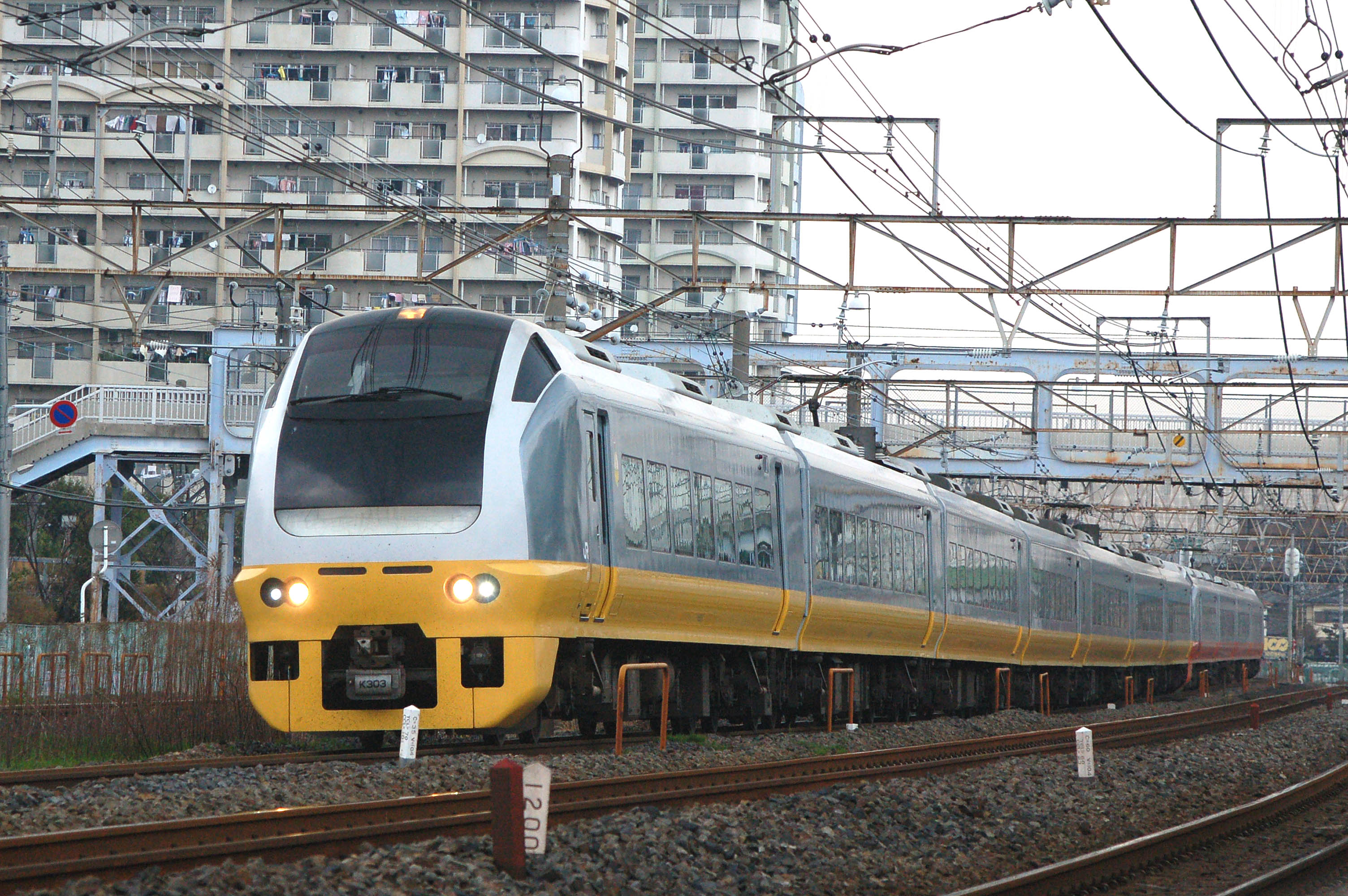
Yellow livery 7-car set K303 in April 2006

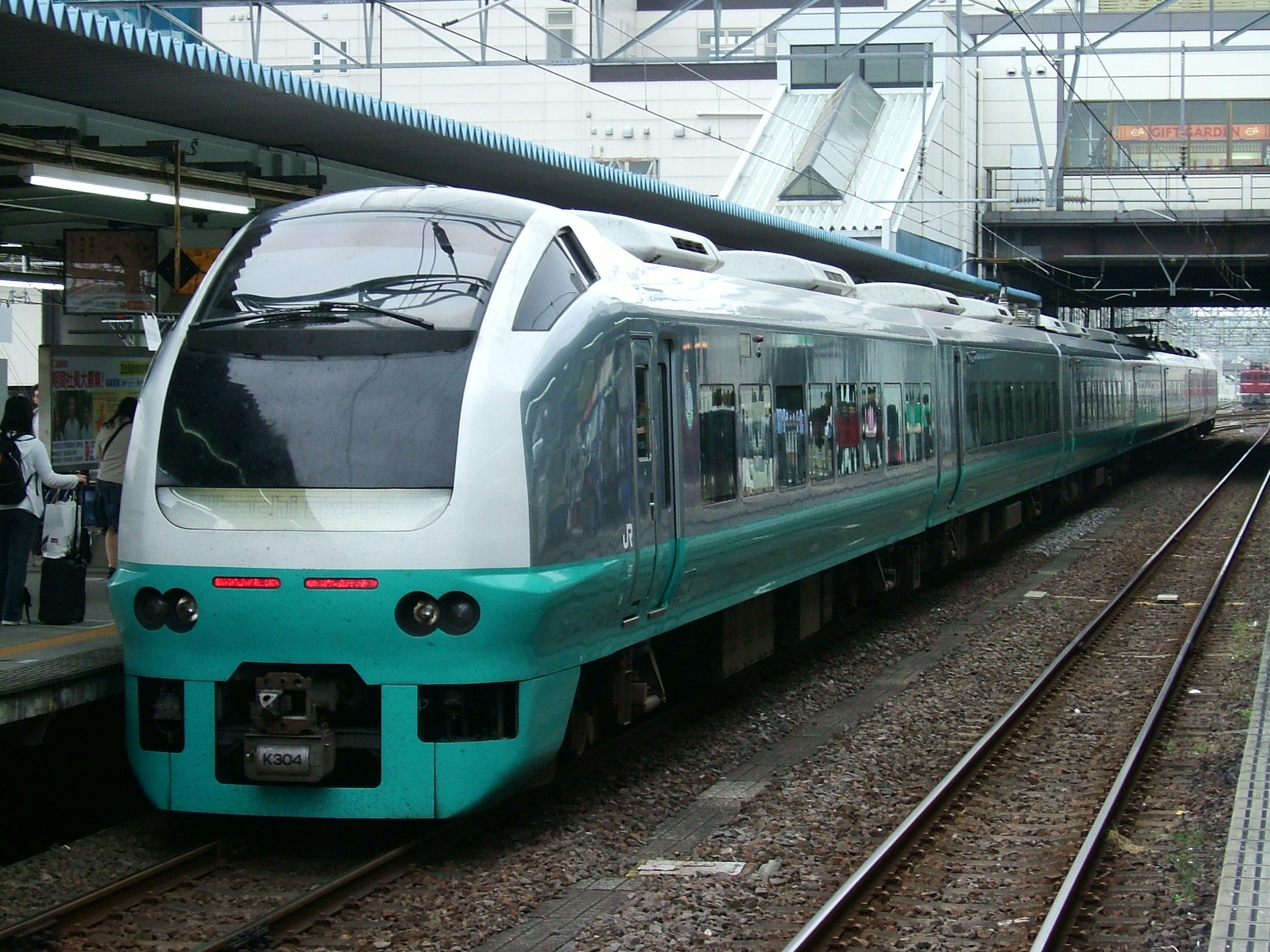
Green livery 7-car set K304 in May 2008

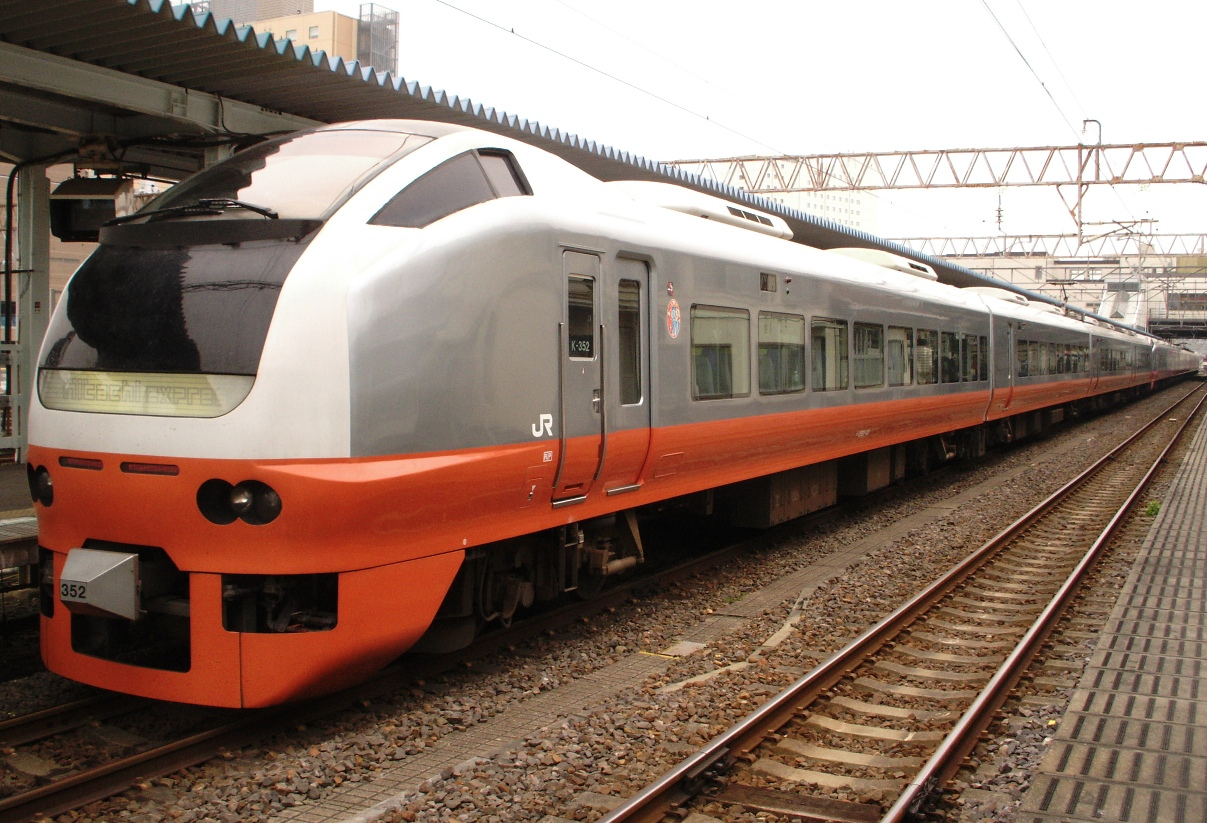
Orange livery 4-car set K352 in March 2007

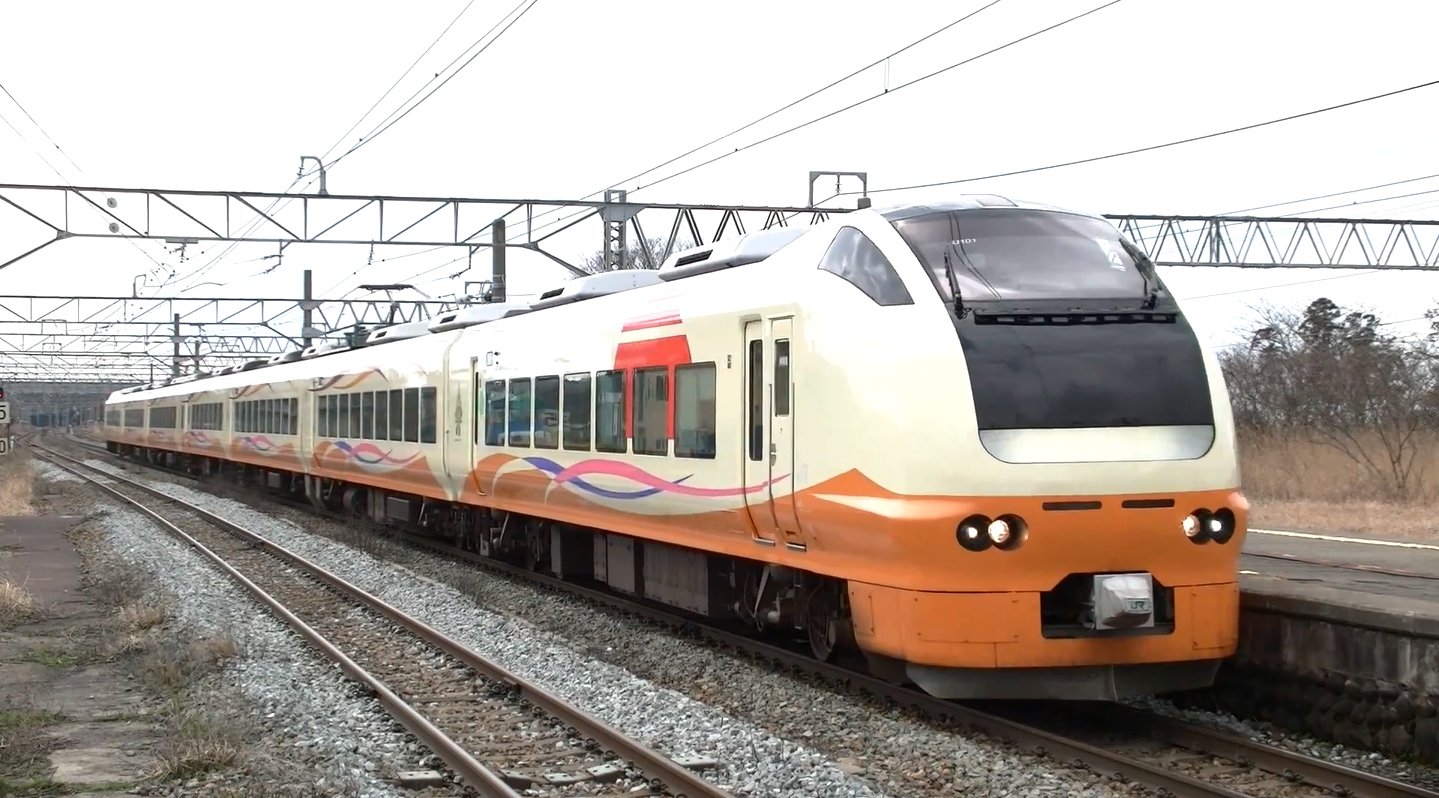
7-car E653-1000 series EMU set U101 in March 2014

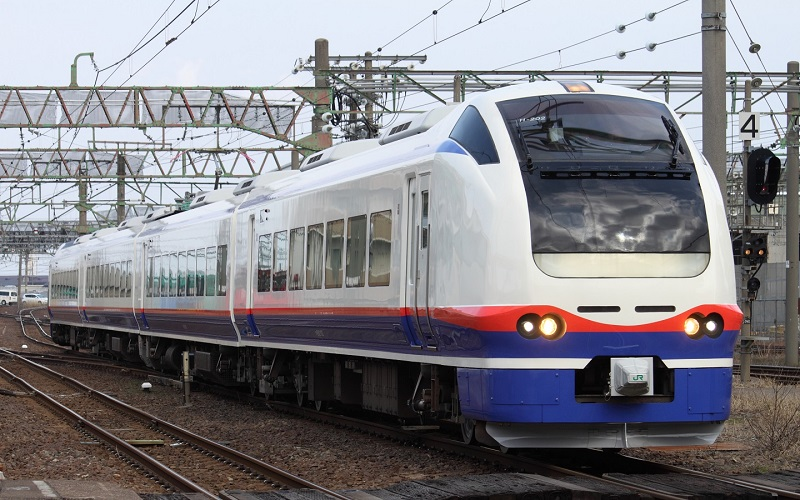
4-car E653-1100 series set H202 in March 2015
