= Akatsuka Station (Ibaraki) =

Railway station in Mito, Ibaraki Prefecture, Japan

Akatsuka Station 赤塚駅
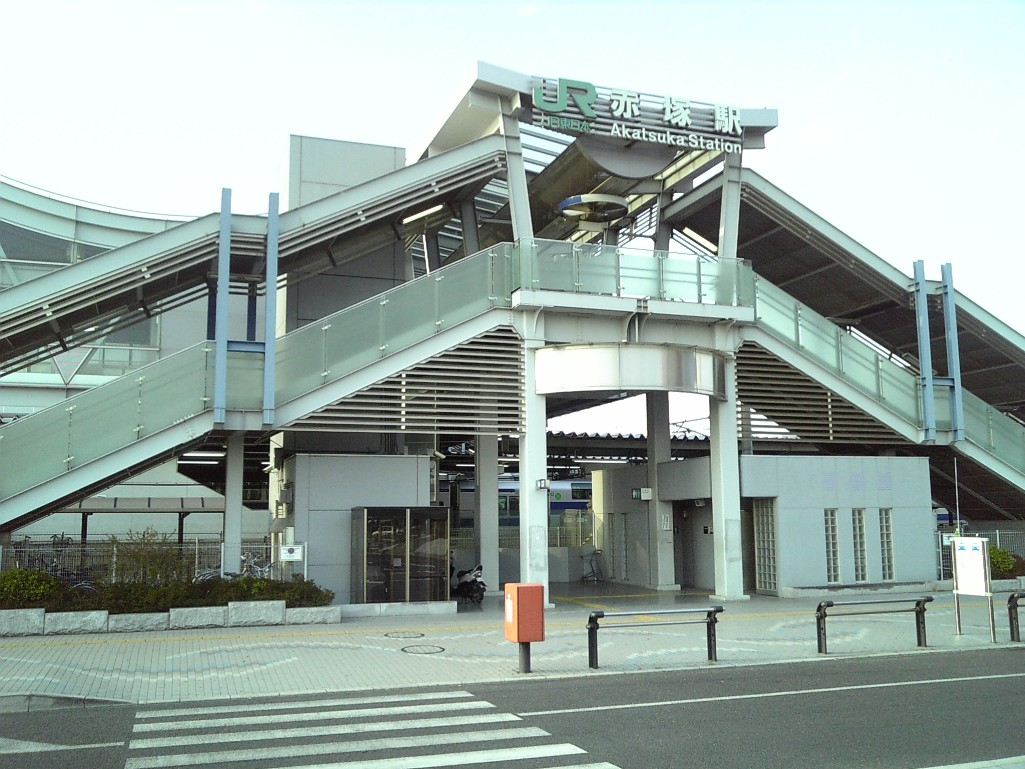
- Akatsuka Station, April 2007

General information
- Location: Akatsuka 1-1866, Mito-shi, Ibaraki-ken 311-4141; Japan
- Coordinates: 36.3817°N 140.4153°E
- Operator: JR East
- Line: ■ Jōban Line
- Distance: 109.3 km from Nippori
- Platforms: 1 side + 1 island platform

Other information
- Status: Staffed (Midori no Madoguchi)
- Website: Official website

History
- Opened: 4 January 1894

Passengers
- FY2019: 6354 daily

Services
Preceding station	JR East	Following station
Tomobe towards Shinagawa	Tokiwa (limited service)	Mito towards Takahagi
Uchihara towards Shinagawa	Jōban Line Local-Futsuu	Mito towards Sendai
Uchihara towards Oyama	Mito Line	Mito Terminus
Seasonal services
Preceding station	JR East	Following station
Tomobe towards Shinagawa	Tokiwa (limited service)	Kairakuen (limited service, seasonal) towards Takahagi
Uchihara towards Shinagawa	Jōban Line Local-Futsuu	Kairakuen (seasonal) towards Sendai
Uchihara towards Oyama	Mito Line	Kairakuen (seasonal) towards Mito
Location
- Location within Ibaraki Prefecture Location within Japan

Akatsuka Station (赤塚駅, Akatsuka-eki) is a passenger railway station located in the city of Mito, Ibaraki Prefecture, Japan operated by the East Japan Railway Company (JR East).

== Lines ==
Akatsuka Station is served by the Jōban Line and the Mito Line, and is located 109.3 km from the official starting point of the Jōban Line at Nippori Station.

== Station layout ==
The station consists of one side platform and one island platform. The station building is elevated and above the platforms. The station has a Midori no Madoguchi staffed ticket office.

=== Platforms ===
1	■ Jōban Line	for Mito, Katsuta, Hitachi, Takahagi and Iwaki
2	■ Jōban Line ( Ueno-Tokyo Line)	for Tomobe, Ishioka, Tsuchiura, Toride, Ueno, Tokyo and Shinagawa
3	■ Jōban Line ( Ueno-Tokyo Line)	for Tomobe, Ishioka, Tsuchiura, Toride, Ueno, Tokyo and Shinagawa
3	■ Mito Line	for Tomobe, Kasama, Shimodate and Oyama

== History ==
Akatsuka Station was opened on 4 January 1894. The Ibaraki Kotsu Ibaraki Line operated from this station from 1926 to 1971. The station was absorbed into the JR East network upon the privatization of the Japanese National Railways (JNR) on 1 April 1987. A new station building was completed in 1999.

== Passenger statistics ==
In fiscal 2019, the station was used by an average of 6354 passengers daily (boarding passengers only).

== Surrounding area ==
- Akatsuka Post Office
- Ibaraki Prefectural Building

== See also ==
- List of railway stations in Japan
