= Tokiwa =

Tokiwa, usually written 常盤, 常磐, or 常葉, may refer to:

== Places ==
- Tokiwa, Fukushima, a town in the north of Japan's main island
- Tokiwa, Aomori, a village in the far north of Japan's main island

== Colleges and universities ==
- Tokiwa Junior College, Mito, Ibaraki
- Tokiwa University, Mito, Ibaraki
- Tokiwakai Gakuen University, Osaka
- Kobe Tokiwa College, Kobe

== Stations ==
- Tokiwa Station (Yamaguchi), Ube, Yamaguchi
- Iwaki-Tokiwa Station, Tamura, Fukushima
- Kai-Tokiwa Station, Minobu, Yamanashi
- Kita-Tokiwa Station, Fujisaki, Aomori
- Shinano-Tokiwa Station, Ōmachi, Nagano

== Other uses ==
- Tokiwa (name)
- Tokiwa-sō, an apartment building
- Japanese ship Tokiwa, several ships
- Tokiwa (train), a Japanese train service
