= Kairakuen Station =

Railway station in Mito, Ibaraki Prefecture, Japan

Kairakuen Station 偕楽園駅
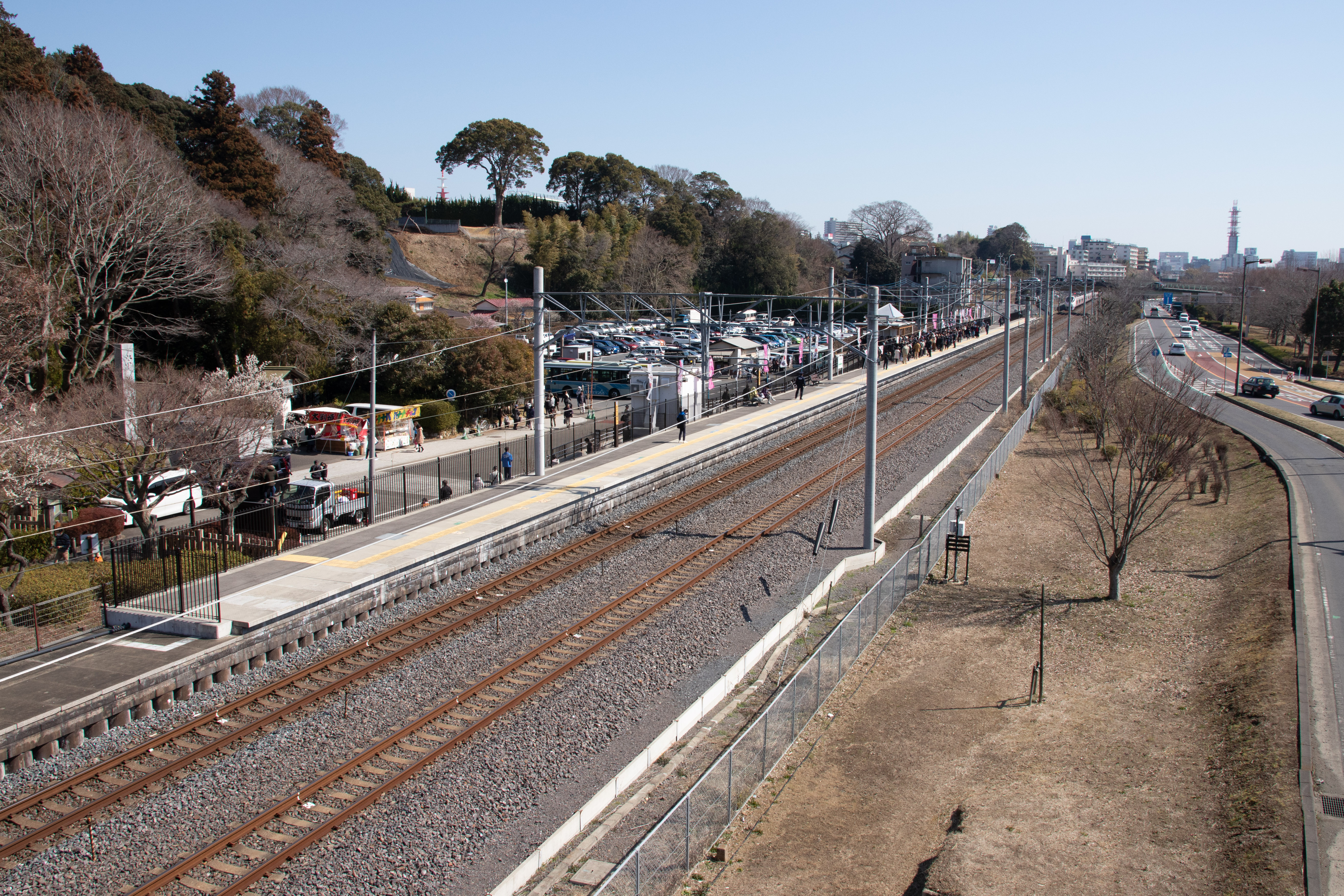
- Kairakuen Station down platform, March 2019

General information
- Location: Tokiwa-cho, Mito-shi, Ibaraki-ken 310-0033; Japan
- Coordinates: 36.3729°N 140.4564°E
- Operator: JR East
- Line: ■ Jōban Line
- Distance: 113.4 km from Nippori
- Platforms: 1 side platform

Other information
- Status: Staffed
- Website: Official website

History
- Opened: 2 February 1925
- Former names: Kōenshita (until 1967)

Passengers
- N/A daily

Services
Preceding station	JR East	Following station
Tsuchiura (limited service) One-way operation	Hitachi (limited service, seasonal)	Mito towards Sendai
Akatsuka (limited service) One-way operation	Tokiwa (limited service, seasonal)	Mito towards Takahagi
Akatsuka One-way operation	Jōban Line Local-Futsuu (seasonal)	Mito towards Sendai
Akatsuka One-way operation	Mito Line (seasonal)	Mito Terminus
Location
- Location within Ibaraki Prefecture Location within Japan

Kairakuen Station (偕楽園駅, Kairakuen-eki) is a passenger railway station on the Jōban Line in Mito, Ibaraki, Japan, operated by the East Japan Railway Company (JR East).

It is a "seasonal" station which serves the nearby Kairaku-en gardens, and is open only during the plum blossom season in February and March. Some Hitachi and Tokiwa limited express services also stop at the station during this period.

== Lines ==
Kairakuen Station is served by the Jōban Line from Ueno Station in Tokyo. Located between Akatsuka and Mito stations, it is 113.4 km from the starting point of the Joban Line at Ueno Station.

== Station layout ==
The station consists of a single side platform serving the down (Mito-bound) track only. Up (Ueno-bound) trains do not stop at this station.

=== Platforms ===
1	■ Jōban Line	for Mito

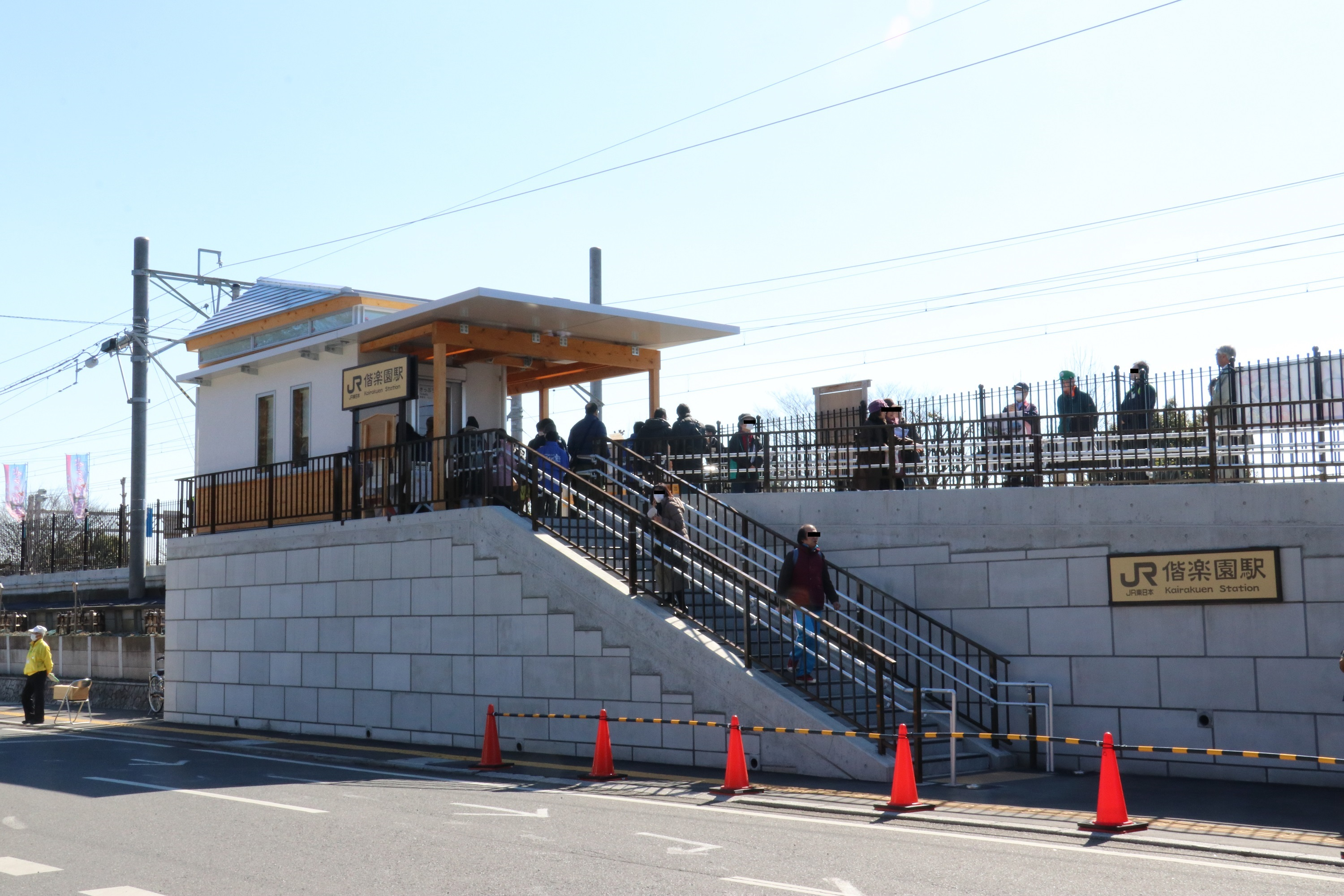
Station entrance, February 2017

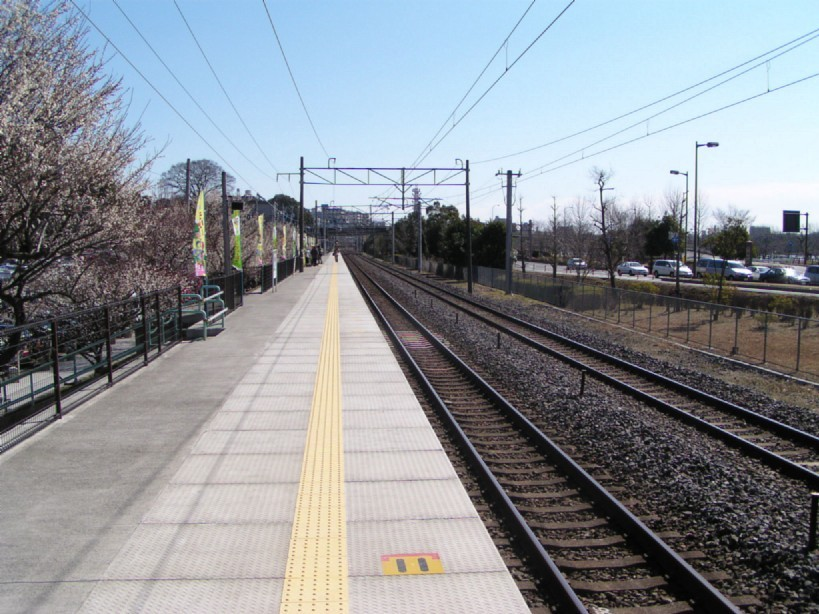
Platform, March 2005

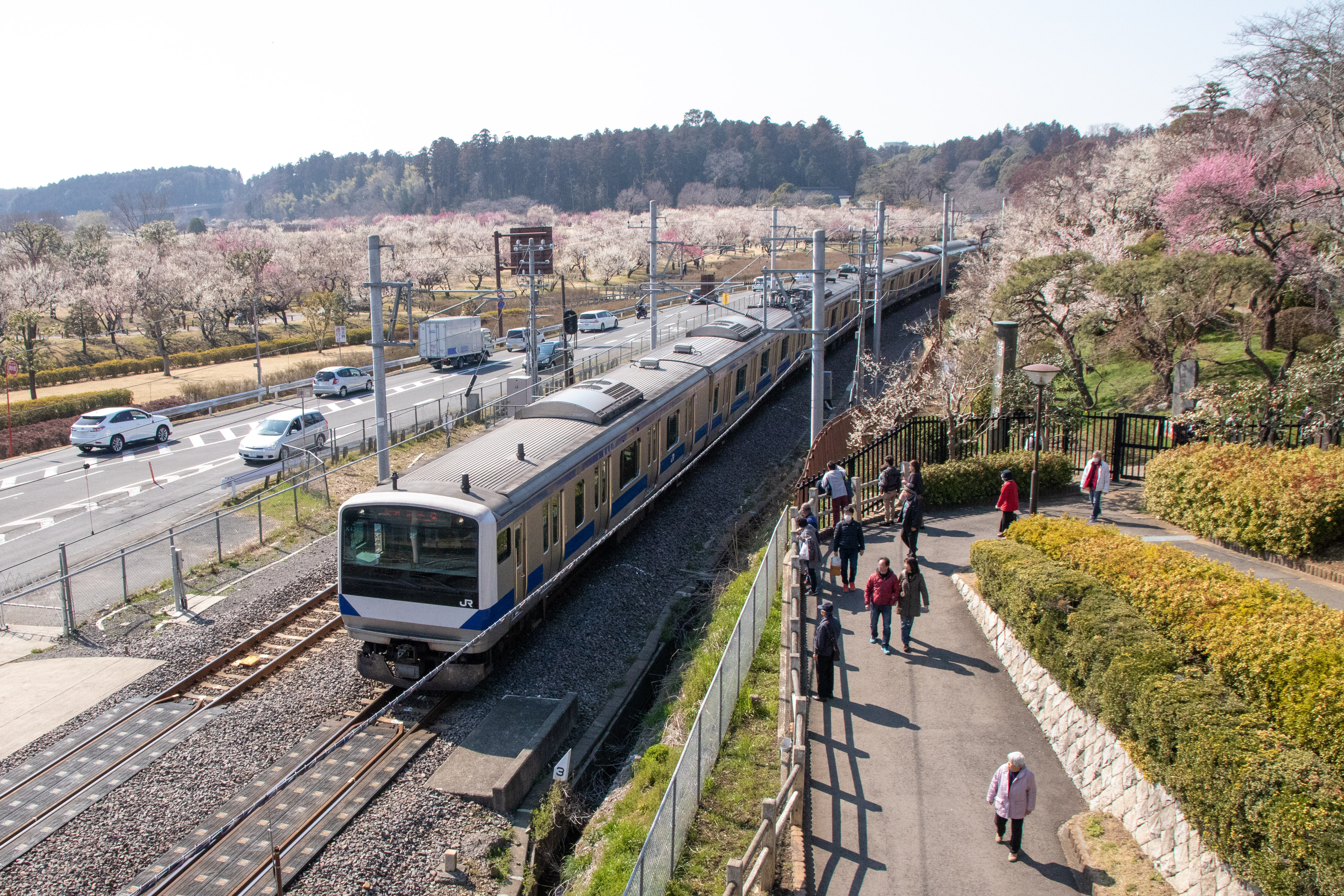
Kairaku-en garden and train

== History ==
The station first opened on 2 February 1925 as Kōenshita temporary station (公園下仮乗降場, Kōenshita-karijōkōjō). On 1 February 1967, it was renamed Kairakuen Station. From 1 April 1987, it became a seasonal station.

== Surrounding area ==
- Kairaku-en gardens
- Ibaraki Prefectural Museum of History
- Tokiwa Jinja shrine

== See also ==
- List of railway stations in Japan
