= Tomobe Station =

Railway station in Kasama, Ibaraki Prefecture, Japan

Tomobe Station 友部駅
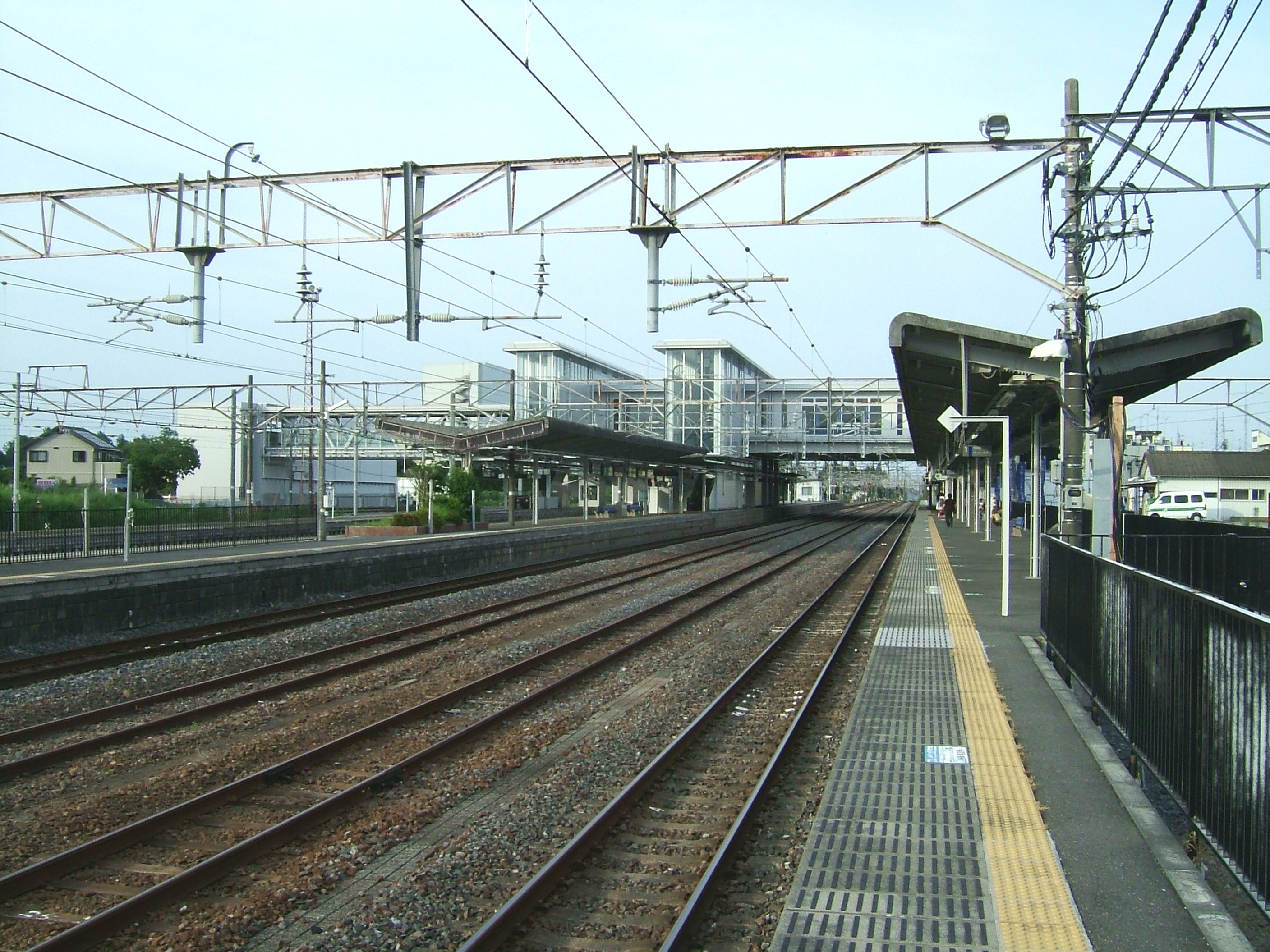
- Joban Line Tomobe Station platform

General information
- Location: Tomobe-ekimae 1-24, Kasama-shi, Ibaraki-ken 309-1735; Japan
- Coordinates: 36.3506°N 140.3057°E
- Operator: JR East; JR Freight
- Lines: ■ Jōban Line; ■ Mito Line
- Distance: 98.9 km from Nippori
- Platforms: 1 side + 2 island platforms

Other information
- Status: Staffed (Midori no Madoguchi)
- Website: Official website

History
- Opened: 1 January 1895

Passengers
- FY2019: 3531 daily

Services
Preceding station	JR East	Following station
Ishioka towards Shinagawa	Tokiwa	Akatsuka (limited service) towards Takahagi
Iwama towards Shinagawa	Jōban Line Local-Futsu	Uchihara towards Sendai
Shishido towards Oyama	Mito Line	Uchihara towards Mito
Location
- Location within Ibaraki Prefecture Location within Japan

Tomobe Station (友部駅, Tomobe-eki) is a passenger railway station located in the city of Kasama, Ibaraki Prefecture, Japan operated by the East Japan Railway Company (JR East). The station is also a freight depot for the Japan Freight Railway Company (JR Freight).

== Lines ==
Tomobe Station is served by the Jōban Line, and is located 98.8 km from the official starting point of the line at Nippori Station. It is also the official terminus of the 50.2 km Mito Line.

== Station layout ==
The station consists of one side platform and two island platforms, connected to the station building by a footbridge. The station has a Midori no Madoguchi ticket office. All the "Tokiwa" trains on the Jōban Line stop at this station. Except during the day, Mito line trains operate directly to Mito/ Katsuta on the Jōban line. During the daytime, two regular trains and one limited express train stop every hour, making it possible to access Tokyo and Shinagawa without having to transfer.

=== Platforms ===
1	■ Jōban Line ( Ueno-Tokyo Line)	for Ishioka, Tsuchiura, Toride, Ueno, Tokyo and Shinagawa
2	■ Jōban Line	for Mito, Katsuta, Hitachi, Takahagi and Iwaki
3	■ Jōban Line	for Mito, Katsuta, Hitachi, Takahagi and Iwaki
3	■ Mito Line	for Kasama, Shimodate and Oyama
4	■ Jōban Line	for Mito (Through service from Mito Line)
4	■ Mito Line	for Kasama, Shimodate and Oyama
5	■ Jōban Line	for Mito (Through service from Mito Line)

== History ==
Tomobe Station was opened on 1 January 1895. The station was absorbed into the JR East network upon the privatization of the Japanese National Railways (JNR) on 1 April 1987. A new station building was completed in 2007.

== Passenger statistics ==
In fiscal 2019, the station was used by an average of 3531 passengers daily (boarding passengers only).

== Surrounding area ==
- Kasama City Hall
- Tomobe Post Office
- Ibaraki Central Hospital

== See also ==
- List of railway stations in Japan
