= Kandatsu Station =

Railway station in Tsuchiura, Ibaraki Prefecture, Japan

Kandatsu Station 神立駅
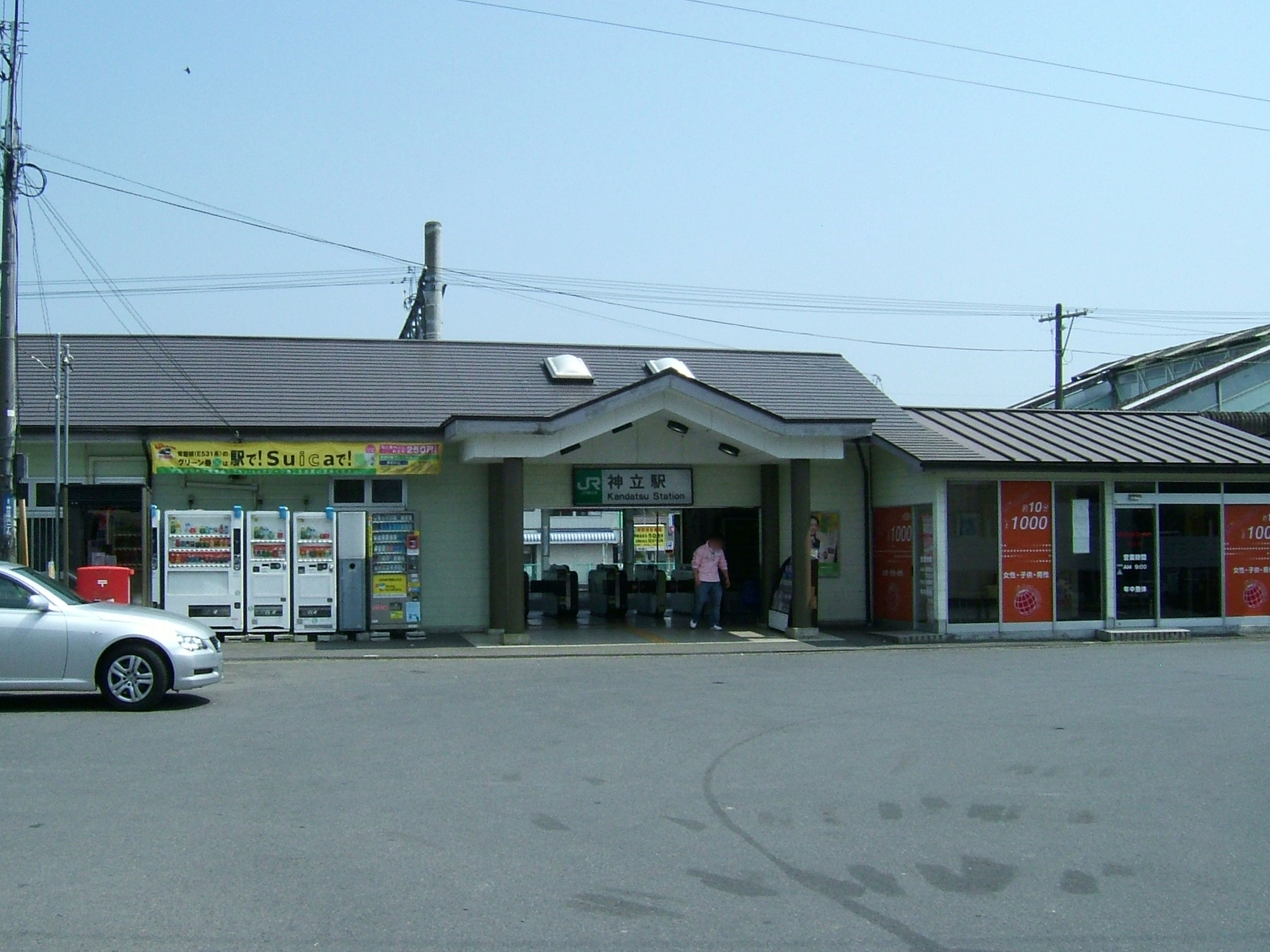
- Kandatsu Station, April 2008

General information
- Location: Kandatsu Chuo 1-1-25, Tsuchiura-shi, Ibaraki-ken 300-0011; Japan
- Coordinates: 36.1204°N 140.2485°E
- Operator: JR East; JR Freight
- Line: ■ Jōban Line
- Distance: 69.9 km (43.4 mi) from Nippori
- Platforms: 1 side + 1 island platform

Other information
- Status: Staffed
- Website: Official website

History
- Opened: 4 November 1895

Passengers
- FY2019: 5,572 daily

Services
Preceding station	JR East	Following station
Tsuchiura towards Shinagawa	Jōban Line Local-Futsuu	Takahama towards Sendai
Location
- Location within Ibaraki Prefecture Location within Japan

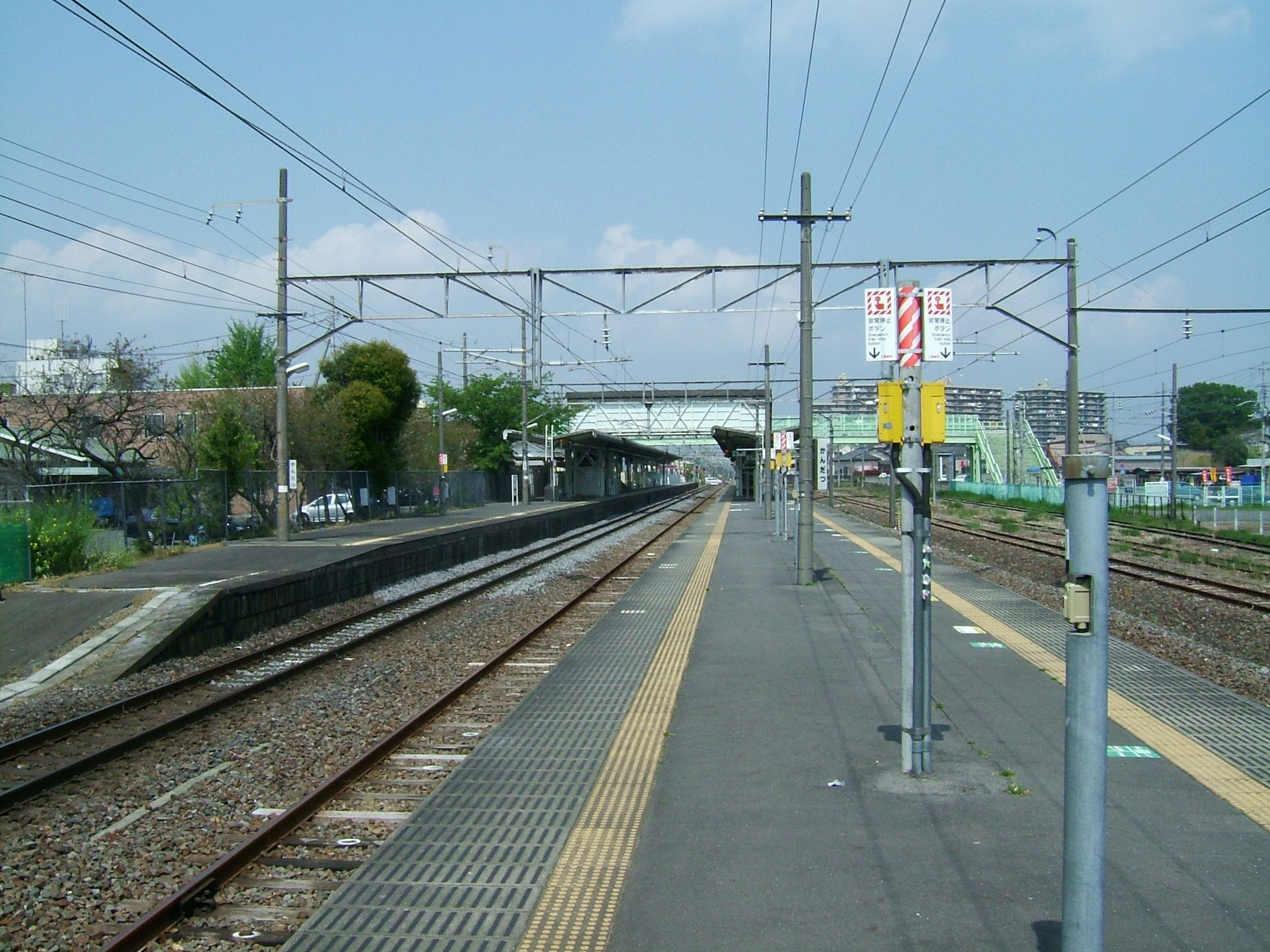
Kandatsu Station platforms

Kandatsu Station (神立駅, Kandatsu-eki) is a railway station in the city of Tsuchiura, Ibaraki Prefecture, Japan, operated by East Japan Railway Company (JR East). It is also a freight depot for the Japan Freight Railway Company (JR Freight).

== Lines ==
Kandatsu Station is served by the Jōban Line, and is located 69.9 km (43.4 mi) from the official starting point of the line at Nippori Station.

== Station layout ==
The station consists of a one side platform and a one island platform, connected to the station building by a footbridge. The station is staffed and two local trains stop approximately every hour during the day.

=== Platforms ===
1	■ Jōban Line	for Ishioka, Tomobe, Mito, Takahagi and Iwaki
2	■ Jōban Line	for Ishioka, Tomobe, Mito, Takahagi and Iwaki
2	■ Jōban Line ( Ueno-Tokyo Line)	for Tsuchiura, Toride, Ueno, Tokyo and Shinagawa
3	■ Jōban Line ( Ueno-Tokyo Line)	for Tsuchiura, Toride, Ueno, Tokyo and Shinagawa

== History ==
Kandatsu Station was opened on 4 November 1895. The station was absorbed into the JR East network upon the privatization of the Japanese National Railways (JNR) on 1 April 1987.

== Passenger statistics ==
In fiscal 2019, the station was used by an average of 5,572 passengers daily (boarding passengers only).

== Surrounding area ==
- Kandatsu Post Office
- Kandatsu Industrial Park

== See also ==
- List of railway stations in Japan
