= Uchihara Station =

Railway station in Mito, Ibaraki Prefecture, Japan

Uchihara Station 内原駅
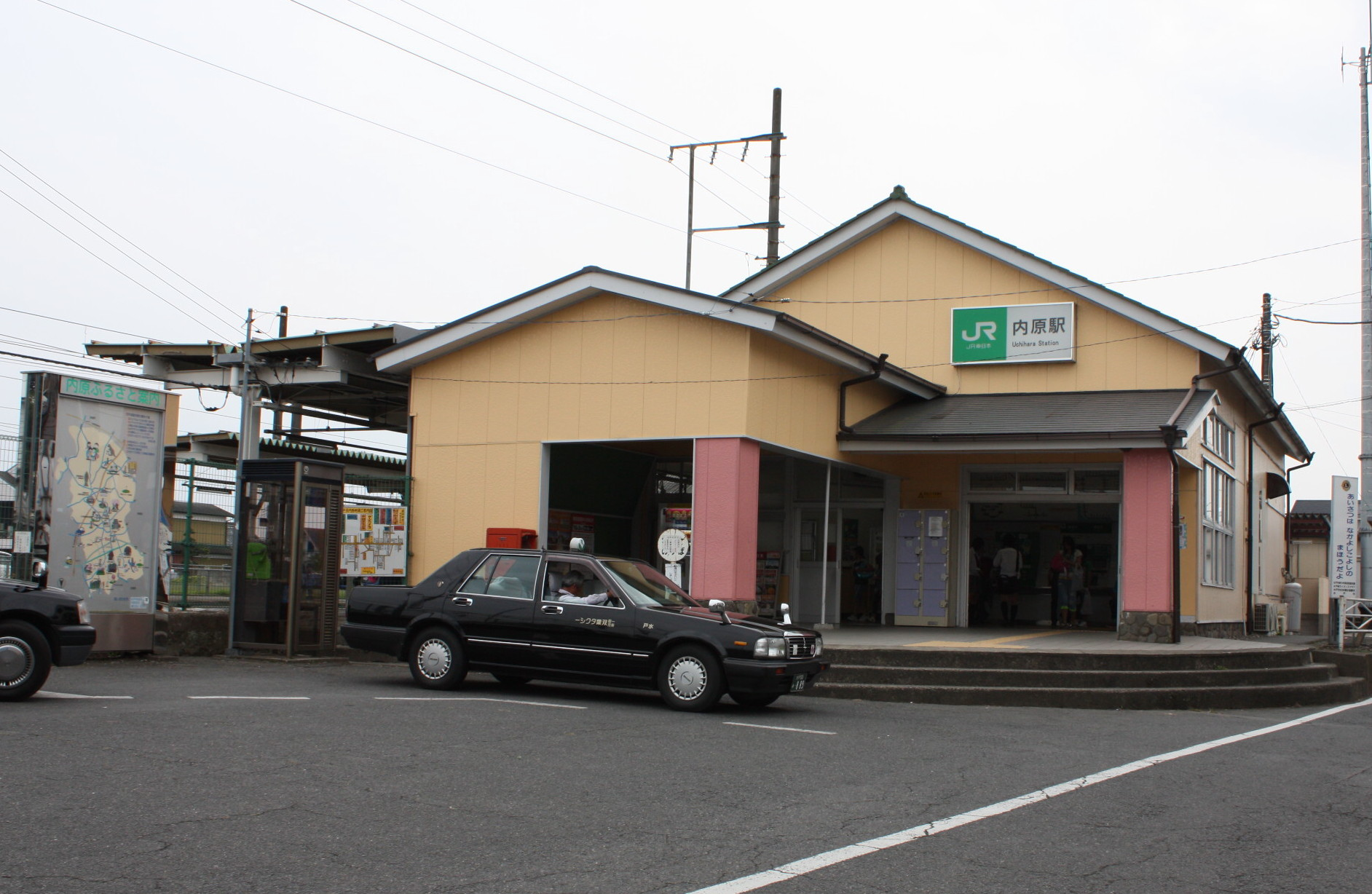
- Uchihara Station, September 2009

General information
- Location: Uchihara 69, Mito-shi, Ibaraki-ken 319-0315; Japan
- Coordinates: 36.3702°N 140.3528°E
- Operator: JR East; JR Freight
- Line: ■ Jōban Line
- Distance: 103.5 km from Nippori
- Platforms: 1 side + 1 island platform

Other information
- Status: Staffed
- Website: Official website

History
- Opened: 16 January 1889

Passengers
- FY2019: 2758 daily

Services
Preceding station	JR East	Following station
Tomobe towards Shinagawa	Jōban Line Local-Futsuu	Akatsuka towards Sendai
Tomobe towards Oyama	Mito Line	Akatsuka towards Mito
Location
- Location within Ibaraki Prefecture Location within Japan

Uchihara Station (内原駅, Uchihara-eki) is a railway station located in the city of Mito, Ibaraki Prefecture, Japan operated by the East Japan Railway Company (JR East). It is also a freight depot for the Japan Freight Railway Company (JR Freight).

== Lines ==
Uchihara Station is served by the Jōban Line and the Mito Line, and is located 103.5 km from the official starting point of the Jōban Line at Nippori Station.

== Station layout ==
The station consists of one side platform and one island platform, connected to the station building by a footbridge. The station is staffed.

=== Platforms ===
1,2	■ Jōban Line	for Mito, Katsuta, Hitachi, Takahagi and Iwaki
3	■ Jōban Line ( Ueno-Tokyo Line)	for Tomobe, Ishioka, Tsuchiura, Toride, Ueno, Tokyo and Shinagawa
3	■ Mito Line	for Tomobe, Kasama, Shimodate and Oyama

== History ==
Uchihara Station opened on 16 January 1889. The station was absorbed into the JR East network upon the privatization of the Japanese National Railways (JNR) on 1 April 1987.

== Passenger statistics ==
In fiscal 2019, the station was used by an average of 2,758 passengers daily (boarding passengers only).

== Surrounding area ==
- Aeon Mall Mito-Uchihara

== See also ==
- List of railway stations in Japan
