= Tsuchiura Station =

Railway station in Tsuchiura, Ibaraki Prefecture, Japan

Tsuchiura Station 土浦駅
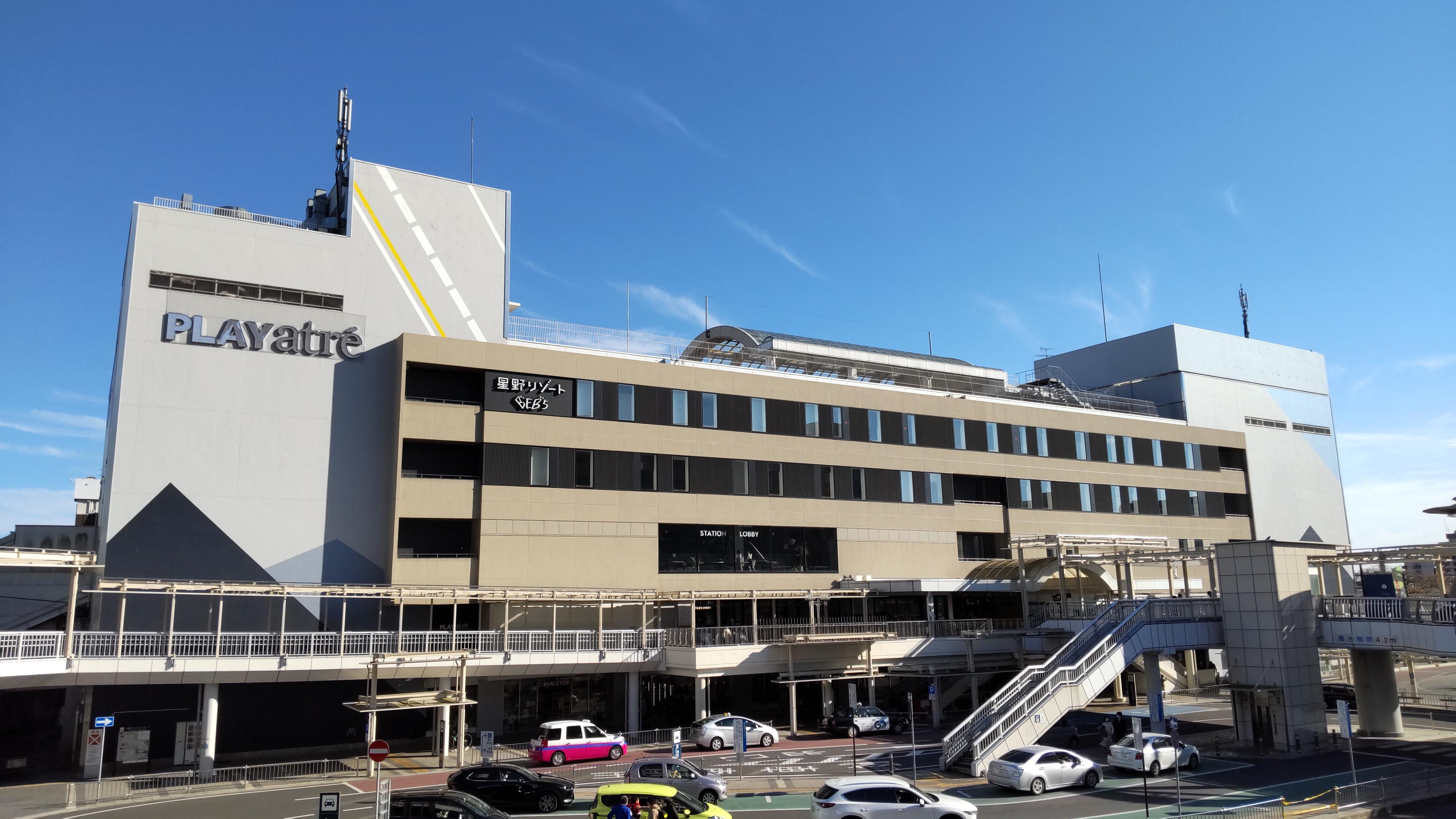
- Tsuchiura Station in November 2020

General information
- Location: 1-30 Ariake-cho, Tsuchiura-shi, Ibaraki-ken; Japan
- Coordinates: 36.0781°N 140.2067°E
- Operator: JR East; JR Freight
- Line: ■ Jōban Line
- Distance: 63.8 km from Nippori
- Platforms: 1 side + 1 island platform
- Tracks: 3

Construction
- Structure type: At-grade
- Accessible: Yes

Other information
- Status: Staffed (Midori no Madoguchi)
- Website: Official website

History
- Opened: 4 November 1895; 130 years ago

Passengers
- FY2019: 15,956 daily

Services
Preceding station	JR East	Following station
Kashiwa JJ07 (limited service) towards Shinagawa	Hitachi (limited service)	Mito towards Sendai
Kashiwa JJ07 (limited service) towards Shinagawa	Hitachi (limited service)	Kairakuen (limited service, seasonal) towards Sendai
Arakawaoki (limited service) towards Shinagawa	Tokiwa	Ishioka towards Takahagi
Arakawaoki towards Shinagawa	Jōban Line Special Rapid	Terminus
Arakawaoki towards Shinagawa	Jōban Line Local-Futsuu	Kandatsu towards Sendai
Location
- Location within Ibaraki Prefecture Location within Japan

Tsuchiura Station (土浦駅, Tsuchiura-eki) is a railway station in the city of Tsuchiura, Ibaraki Prefecture, Japan, operated by East Japan Railway Company (JR East). It is also a freight depot for the Japan Freight Railway Company (JR Freight).

== Lines ==
Tsuchiura Station is served by the Jōban Line, and is located 63.8 km from the official starting point of the line at Nippori Station.

== Station layout ==
The station consists of one side platform and one island platform, connected to the station building by a footbridge. The station has a Midori no Madoguchi staffed ticket office.

=== Platforms ===
1	■ Jōban Line	for Ishioka, Tomobe, Mito, Takahagi, and Iwaki
2, 3	■ Jōban Line ( Ueno-Tokyo Line)	for Toride, Kashiwa, Ueno, Tokyo, and Shinagawa

== History ==
Tsuchiura Station opened on 4 November 1895.

The Tsukuba Railway Line operated from this station from 1 April 1987. On 26 October 1943, three trains crashed at Tsuchiura killing 110 people. The station was absorbed into the JR East network upon the privatization of the Japanese National Railways (JNR) on 1 April 1987.

== Passenger statistics ==
In fiscal 2019, the station was used by an average of 15,956 passengers daily (boarding passengers only).

== Other transportation ==
=== Buses ===
- For Edosaki
- For Tsukuba Center
- For Tamatsukuri
- For Midorino Station

=== Port of Tsuchiura ===
Name	Via	Destination	Company	Note
Tsuchiura・Itako Line	Hozaki・Tamatsukuri	Itako Station	Jōyō Kankō and Lacusmarina	Seats on the ferry must be reserved.

== Surrounding area ==
- Lake Kasumigaura
- Tsuchiura Castle
- Tsukuba International University

== See also ==
- List of railway stations in Japan
