= Tokiwa (name) =

Tokiwa is both a Japanese surname and a given name. Notable people with the name include:

== People with the surname ==
- Kyota Tokiwa (常盤 亨太; born 2002), Japanese footballer
- Satoshi Tokiwa (常盤 聡; born 1987), Japanese footballer
- Takako Tokiwa (常盤 貴子; born 1972), Japanese actress
- Tokiwa Gozen (常盤 御前; 1123 – c. 1180), Japanese noblewoman
- Toyoko Tokiwa (常盤 とよ子; 1928–2019), Japanese photographer
- Yūki Tokiwa (常盤 祐貴; born 1991), Japanese voice actor
- Yutaka Tokiwa Japanese Senior Researcher

== People with the given name ==
- Mishima Tokiwa (三島 常盤; 1854–1941), Japanese photographer
