= Morikawa =

Morikawa (most commonly 森川) is a Japanese surname. Notable people with the surname include:

- Aizō Morikawa (1878–1949), photographer
- Ayaka Morikawa (森川彩香, born 1996), Japanese actress and former member idol group AKB48 and Queen God
- Collin Morikawa (born 1997), American golfer
- Morikawa Kanichirō (森川 勘一郎, 1887－1980), Japanese tea master
- Kei Morikawa (森川 圭), Japanese film director
- Miho Morikawa (born 1968), singer and model
- Toshiyuki Morikawa (born 1967), voice actor
- Yōichirō Morikawa (born 1979), film director, screenwriter and actor
- Yoshio Morikawa (森川 嘉男, born 1945), Japanese racewalker
- Yuki Morikawa (森川 裕基, born 1993), Japanese footballer
