= Aizō Morikawa =

Japanese photographer

- Born: 1878; Fukui Prefecture
- Died: 5 February 1949 (aged 70–71); Tokyo
- Occupations: Portrait and commercial photographer
- Known for: Morikawa Shashinkan

Aizō Morikawa (森川 愛三, Morikawa Aizō; 1878–1949) was a renowned Japanese portrait and commercial photographer.

Born in Fukui Prefecture in 1878, Fukui went some time around 1897 to Sapporo, where he studied photography under Tokiwa Mishima in Mishima's studio. Around 1907, he moved to Tokyo, where he studied under Kazumasa Ogawa.

Morikawa ended up with his own studio, Morikawa Shashinkan (森川写真館, which became renowned as outstanding in Tokyo and the premier studio in Japan for omiai photography. Morikawa died in Tokyo on 5 February 1949.

Some of Morikawa's work is in the permanent collection of the Tokyo Metropolitan Museum of Photography.
