= Japanese ship Tokiwa =

Several Japanese ships have been named Tokiwa:

- Japanese cruiser Tokiwa, Asama-class cruiser of the Imperial Japanese Navy launched in 1898; converted into a minelayer in the 1920s; beached in 1945 after an attack by US Navy fighters; scrapped in 1947
- JS Tokiwa (AOE-423), a Towada-class replenishment ship of the Japan Maritime Self-Defense Force launched in 1989
