= Yutaka Tokiwa =

Senior researcher at Okinawa Industrial Technology Center

Yutaka Tokiwa is a Senior Researcher at Okinawa Industrial Technology Center, who has published extensively on the biodegradability of plastics. He has an h-index of 64 according to Google Scholar.
