= Mishima Tokiwa =

Japanese photographer

Mishima Tokiwa (三島 常盤; 1854–1941) was a renowned Japanese photographer.
