= Hitachi (Japanese train) =

Japanese train service

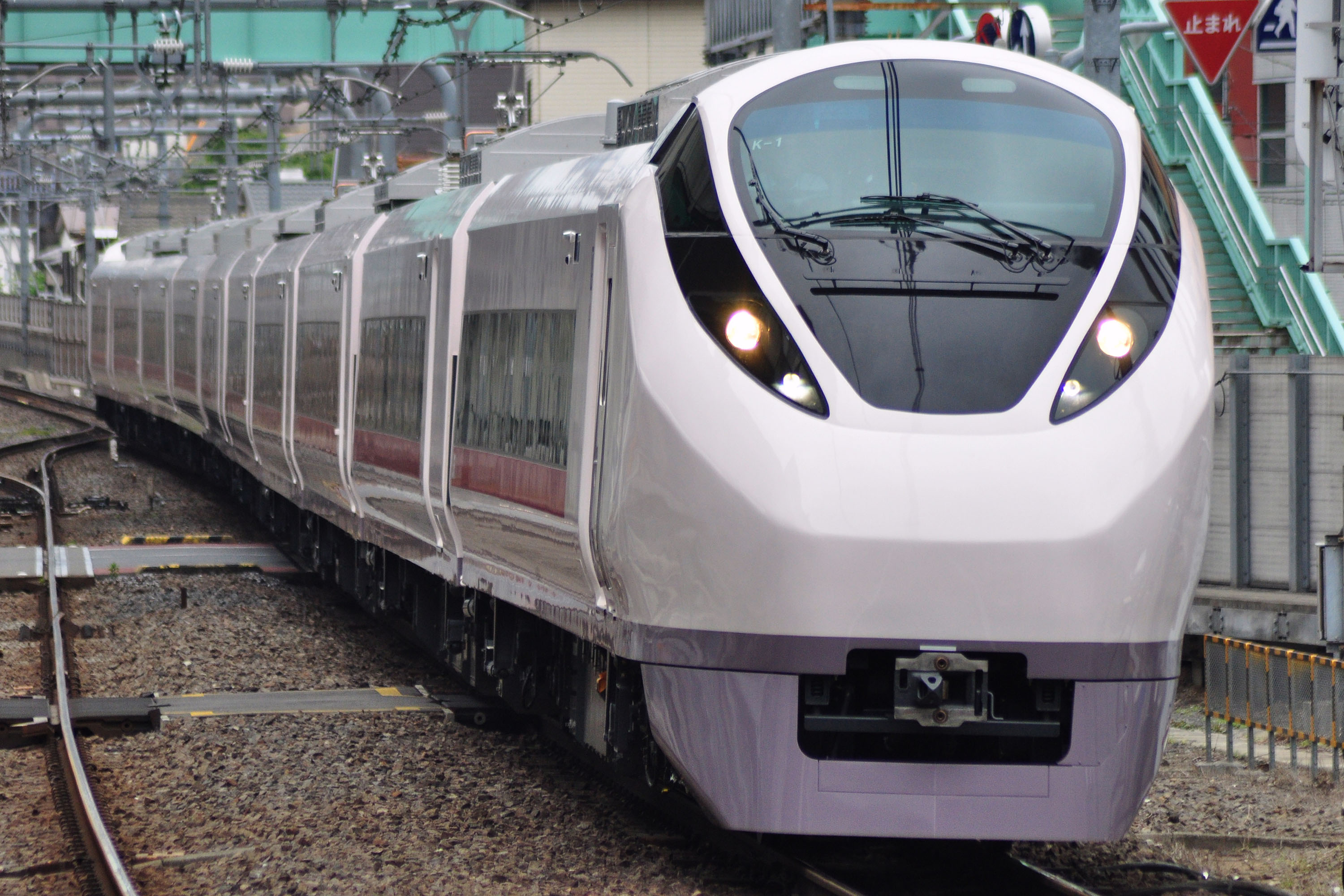
- E657 series EMU

Overview
- Service type: Limited express
- Locale: Japan
- First service: 1963 (the original Hitachi); 1989 (Super Hitachi); 1997 (Fresh Hitachi); 2015 (the new Hitachi)
- Last service: 1998 (the original Hitachi); 2015 (Super Hitachi); 2015 (Fresh Hitachi)
- Current operator(s): JR East
- Former operator(s): JNR

Route
- Termini: Shinagawa; Sendai (Miyagi)
- Line(s) used: Jōban Line, Tōhoku Main Line, Tōkaidō Main Line

On-board services
- Class(es): Green + Standard
- Catering facilities: Trolley service

Technical
- Rolling stock: E657 series
- Track gauge: 1,067 mm (3 ft 6 in)
- Electrification: 1,500 V DC / 20 kV AC 50 Hz
- Operating speed: 130 km/h (80 mph)

Hitachi (ひたち) is a limited express train service operated in Japan by East Japan Railway Company (JR East) on the Jōban Line between Shinagawa Station / Ueno Station in Tokyo and Sendai Station in Miyagi Prefecture. The Tokiwa service follows the same route but makes additional stops.

== History ==
The Hitachi (ひたち) name was taken from the former Hitachi Province (常陸), which is now part of the Ibaraki Prefecture.

The service was first introduced on 1 October 1963 for a semi-express service which operated daily between Ueno and Taira (present-day Iwaki) using 451 series EMU stock, will all cars reserved. This service operated until 30 September 1967.

The name was subsequently reintroduced on 1 October 1969 for a once-daily seasonal limited-express service operating between Ueno and Iwaki using 7-car KiHa 81 series diesel multiple units. This became a regular daily service the following year.

485 series EMUs were phased in from 2 October 1972, and were used until services were discontinued in December 1998. From 1 April 1973, one return service daily was extended to operate between Ueno and Sendai. From 1 October of the same year, the number of services to and from Sendai was increased to six return services. From 2 October 1978, this number was increased to 11 return services daily, to 12 from 15 November 1982, to 23 from 14 March 1985 with the discontinuation of the Tokiwa express, and to 26 return services daily from 1 November 1986.

During the 1990s, services were operated using Katsuta-based seven-car 485 series formations with no Green car accommodation. Fourteen-car formations were sometimes used.

The original Hitachi was discontinued from December 1998 with the withdrawal of the last 485 series electric multiple units (EMUs) on the Jōban Line, with the main daytime limited express services subsequently being named Super Hitachi and Fresh Hitachi.

From the start of the 14 March 2015 timetable revision, Super Hitachi services were renamed simply Hitachi, and Fresh Hitachi services were renamed Tokiwa. From the same date, services were extended south of Ueno via the new Ueno-Tokyo Line, with most services terminating at Shinagawa Station.

From the start of the 18 March 2023 timetable revision, all Hitachi services terminating at Ueno Station were extended to Shinagawa Station.

== Ticketing ==
A supplementary ticket has to be purchased to board the train, along with the basic fare ticket. There are two types of such supplementary tickets, namely the Reserved Seat Ticket (座席指定券, Zaseki shitei ken), and the Unreserved Seat Ticket (座席未指定券, Zaseki mishitei ken).

The Reserved Seat Ticket enables a specified seat to be reserved for the holder. The reserved status for the seat is signified by a green overhead lamp on top of the corresponding seat.

The Unreserved Seat Ticket enables the holder to be seated on any unreserved seat. A red overhead lamp signifies that the seat is unreserved; while a yellow overhead lamp signifies that the seat is reserved for the later part of the journey, implying that one has to give up their seat to the passenger who has reserved the seat and change to another vacant seat, when they board the train later.

== Past services ==
In the past, there were 2 limited express services that bore the name Hitachi.

=== Super Hitachi ===
The Super Hitachi (スーパーひたち) was introduced on 11 March 1989, operating between Ueno and Iwaki or Sendai, using new 651 series EMUs. It operated at a maximum speed of 130 km/h. Services are generally formed of 7-car or 7+4-car formations, with only the 4-car sets continuing north of Iwaki. It served as the faster limited express compared to the Fresh Hitachi (see below).

Trains operating between Iwaki and Sendai had discontinued, due to the 2011 Tohoku earthquake and tsunami, which caused severe damages at parts of the section. From that point on, Super Hitachi services only operated between Ueno and Iwaki.

From the start of the revised timetable on 17 March 2012, new E657 series EMUs were phased in on some Super Hitachi services, and entirely replaced the 651 series trains by the start of the revised timetable on 16 March 2013.

By the start of another timetable revision on 14 March 2015, Super Hitachi services have been renamed as the Hitachi, ending the Super Hitachi's 26-year service.

=== Fresh Hitachi ===
The Fresh Hitachi (フレッシュひたち) was introduced on 1 October 1997 between Ueno and Iwaki, using new E653 series EMUs. It operated at a maximum speed of 130 km/h. Services were initially formed of 7-car, 7+4-car, or 7+7-car E653 EMUs, as well as 7-car or 7+4-car 651 series EMUs. It served as the slower limited express compared to the Super Hitachi.

From the start of the revised timetable on 17 March 2012, new 10-car E657 series EMUs were introduced on Fresh Hitachi services, operating alongside existing 651 series and E653 series sets, and as of 16 March 2013, all services are operated using E657 series EMUs. During the period between 1 October 2013 and around March 2015, however, one up and one down Fresh Hitachi service daily will be operated by an 11-car 651 series formation covering while the E657 series fleet undergoes modification work to add LED seat reservation status indicators above each seat.

By the start of another timetable revision on 14 March 2015, Fresh Hitachi services have been renamed as the Tokiwa, ending the Fresh Hitachi's 18-year service.

== Rolling stock ==
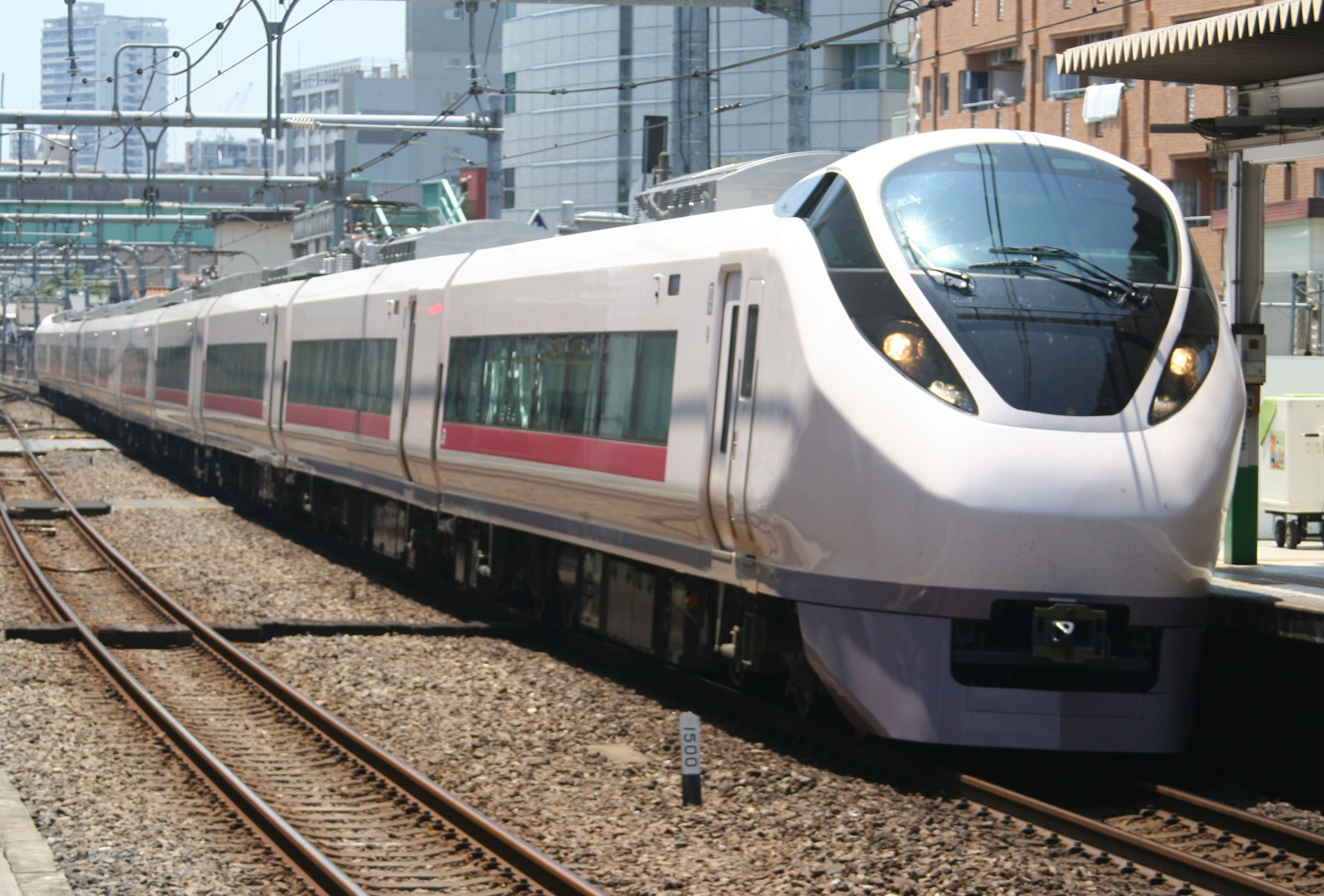
E657 series EMU, July 2011

As of 16 March 2013, all services are operated by E657 series 10-car EMUs, first introduced from March 2012, although 11-car 651 series formations will be substituted on some services between 1 October 2013 and March 2015.

=== Past rolling stock ===
- 451 series EMUs (Hitachi, October 1963 - 30 September 1967)
- KiHa 81 series DMUs (Hitachi, October 1963 - ?)
- 485 series EMUs (Hitachi, 2 October 1972 - December 1998)
- 651 series 4/7/11-car EMUs (Super Hitachi, Fresh Hitachi 11 March 1989 - 15 March 2013)
- E653 series 7/11/14-car EMUs (Fresh Hitachi since 1 October 1997 - 15 March 2013)
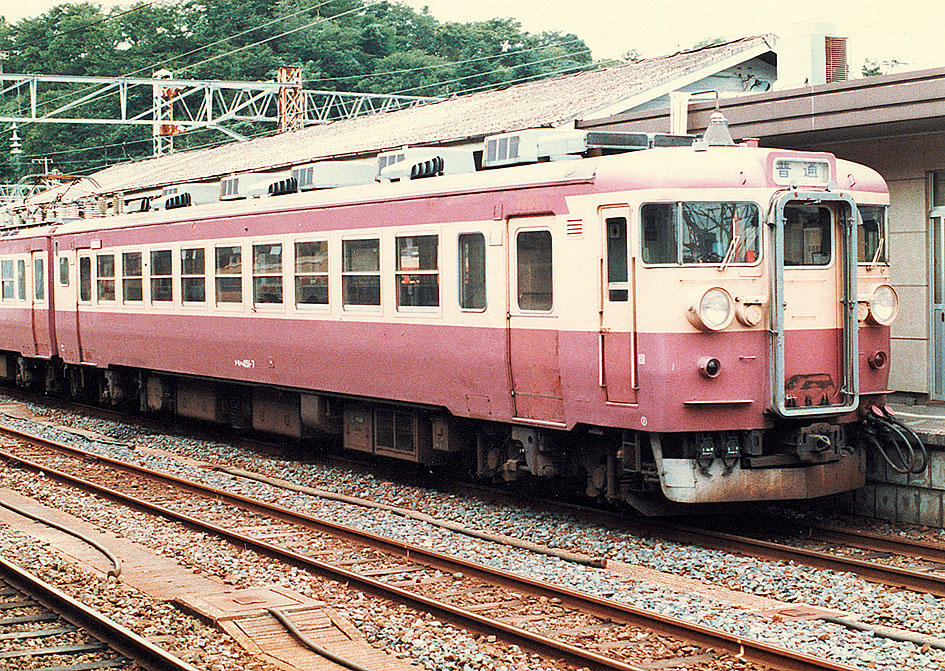
JNR 451 series

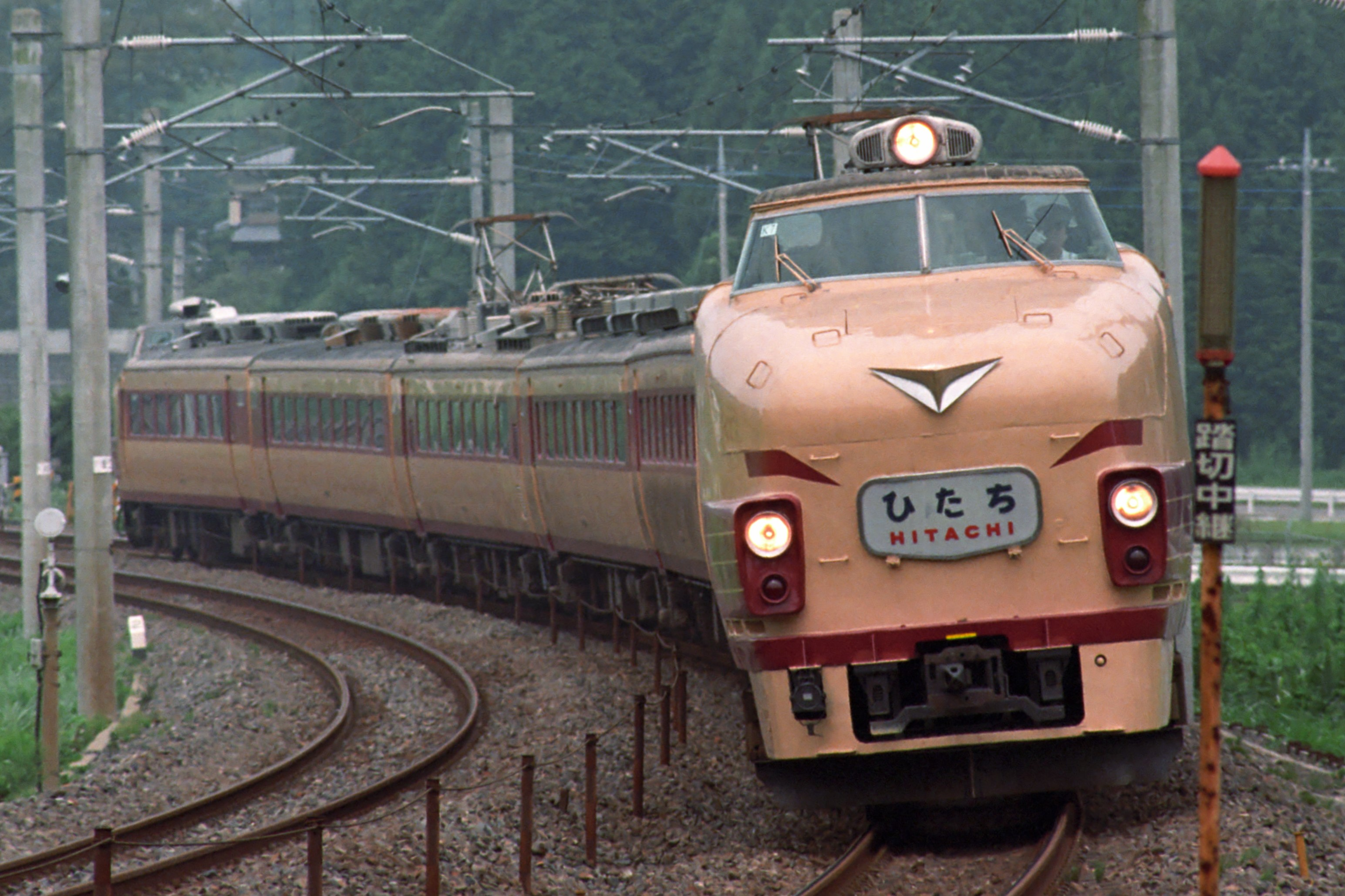
"Bonnet-style" 485 series on a Hitachi service, August 1998

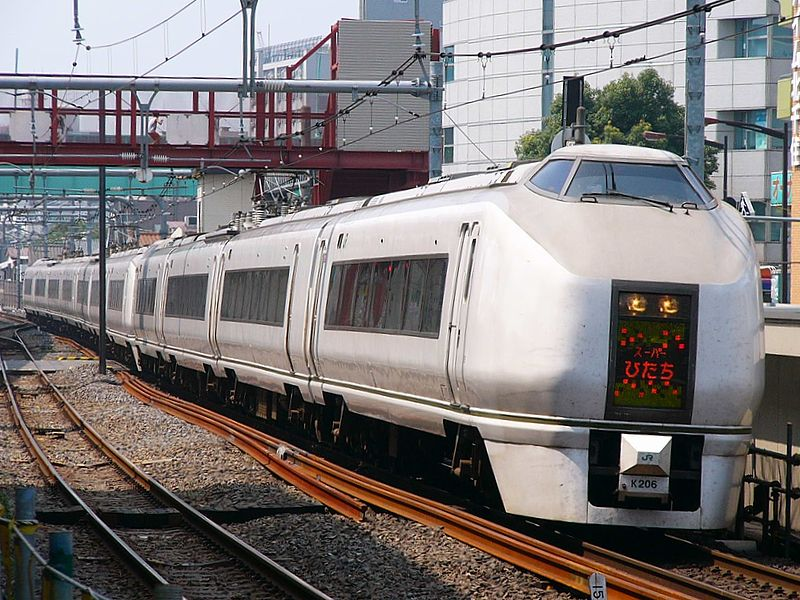
651 series on a Super Hitachi service, July 2005

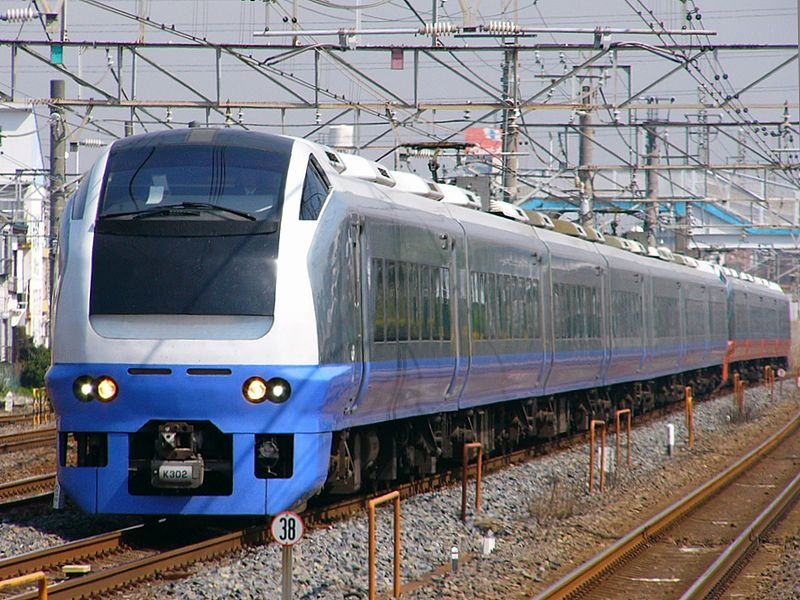
E653 series on a Fresh Hitachi service, April 2003

== Formations ==
Trains are formed as shown below, with car 1 at the Shinagawa end. All cars are no smoking.

=== Hitachi ===
All seats are reserved.

E657 series (10 cars)
Car No.	1	2	3	4	5	6	7	8	9	10
Accommodation	Reserved	Reserved	Reserved	Reserved	Green	Reserved	Reserved	Reserved	Reserved	Reserved

=== Past formations ===
==== Super Hitachi (Prior to 13 March 2015) ====
E657 series (10 cars)
Car No.	1	2	3	4	5	6	7	8	9	10
Accommodation	Reserved	Reserved	Reserved	Reserved	Green	Reserved	Reserved	Non-reserved	Non-reserved	Non-reserved

651 series (7+4 cars)
Car No.	1	2	3	4	5	6	7	8	9	10	11
Accommodation	Reserved	Reserved	Reserved	Green	Reserved	Non-reserved	Non-reserved	Non-reserved	Non-reserved	Reserved	Reserved
Set	Basic set							Additional set			

==== Fresh Hitachi (Prior to 13 March 2015) ====
E657 series (10 cars)
Car No.	1	2	3	4	5	6	7	8	9	10
Accommodation	Reserved	Reserved	Reserved	Reserved	Green	Reserved	Non-reserved	Non-reserved	Non-reserved	Non-reserved

651 series (7+4 cars)
Car No.	1	2	3	4	5	6	7	8	9	10	11
Accommodation	Reserved	Reserved	Reserved	Green	Non-reserved	Non-reserved	Non-reserved	Non-reserved	Non-reserved	Reserved	Reserved
Set	Basic set							Additional set			

E653 series (7+4 cars)
Car No.	1	2	3	4	5	6	7	8	9	10	11
Accommodation	Reserved	Reserved	Reserved	Reserved	Non-reserved	Non-reserved	Non-reserved	Non-reserved	Non-reserved	Reserved	Reserved
Set	Basic set							Additional set			

E653 series (7+7 cars)
Car No.	1	2	3	4	5	6	7	8	9	10	11	12	13	14
Accommodation	Reserved	Reserved	Reserved	Reserved	Non-reserved	Non-reserved	Non-reserved	Non-reserved	Non-reserved	Non-reserved	Non-reserved	Reserved	Reserved	Reserved
Set	Basic set							Basic set						

== See also ==
- Tokiwa (train)
- List of named passenger trains of Japan
