= Ueno–Tokyo Line =

JR East railway that runs in Tokyo, Japan

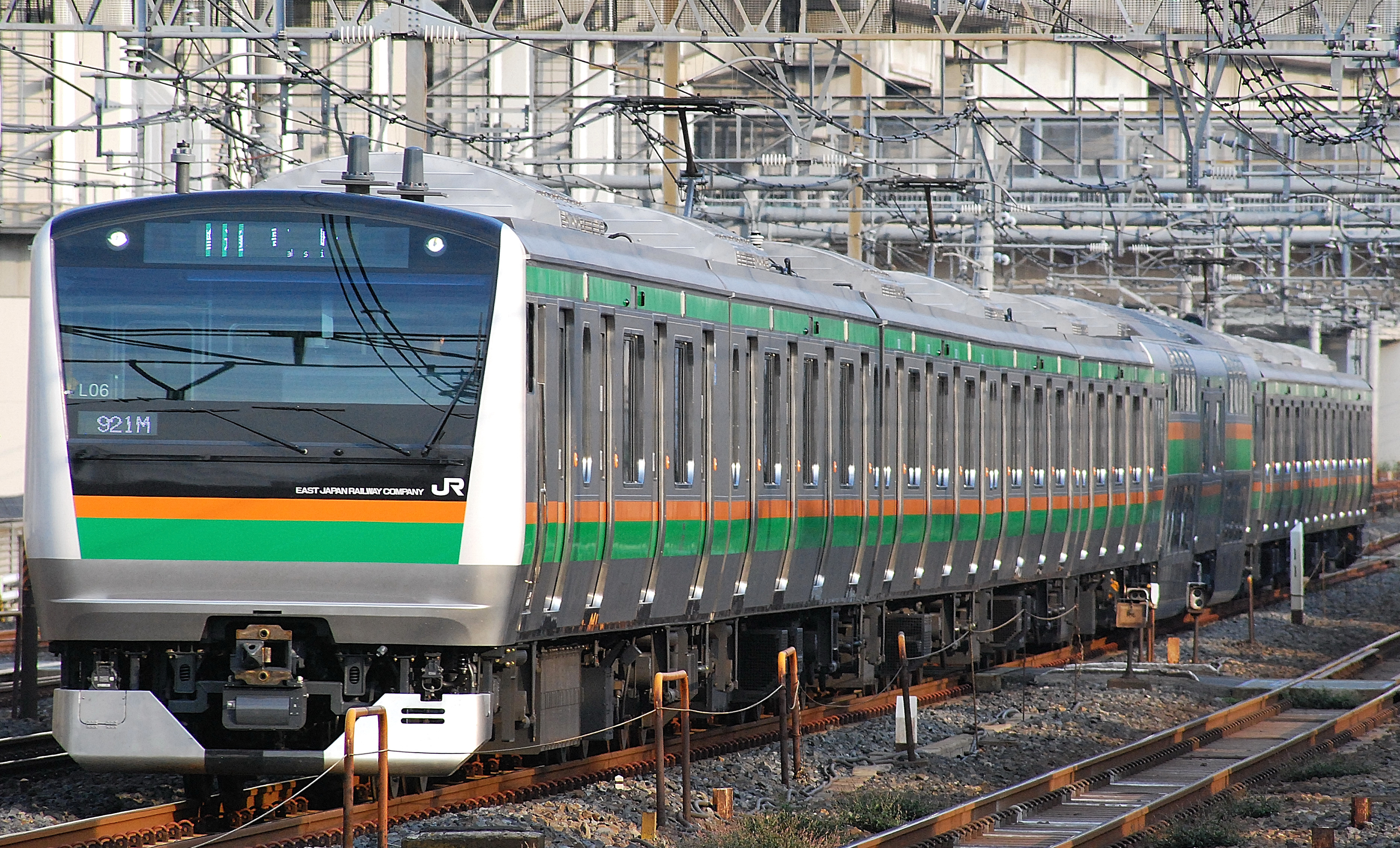
- An E233-3000 series EMU, one of the train types used on the Ueno–Tokyo Line

Overview
- Native name: 上野東京ライン
- Status: Operational
- Locale: Tokyo
- Termini: Ueno (services through-run to Maebashi/Utsunomiya/Narita/Takahagi); Tokyo (services through-run to Numazu/Atami/Ito)
- Stations: 2

Service
- Type: Commuter rail
- Operator(s): JR East
- Daily ridership: 320,229 (daily, 2015)

History
- Opened: 14 March 2015; 11 years ago

Technical
- Line length: 3.6 km (2.2 mi)
- Track length: 3.8 km (2.4 mi)
- Track gauge: 1,067 mm (3 ft 6 in)
- Electrification: 1,500 V DC overhead catenary
- Operating speed: 100 km/h (62 mph)

The Ueno–Tokyo Line (Japanese: 上野東京ライン, romanized: Ueno–Tōkyō Rain), formerly known as the Tōhoku Through Line (Japanese: 東北縦貫線, romanized: Tōhoku-Jūkan-sen) is a railway line in Tokyo, Japan, operated by the East Japan Railway Company (JR East), linking Ueno Station and Tokyo Station, extending the services of the Utsunomiya Line, the Takasaki Line, and the Jōban Line southward and onto the Tōkaidō Main Line and vice versa. While on official maps the line is purple, rolling stock and signage show the line as orange stacked on green, the colours used by the lines it connects. The project began in May 2008 and was opened with the 14 March 2015 timetable revision, costing about JPY 40 billion.

Direct travel was expected to ease congestion on the Yamanote Line and Keihin–Tōhoku Line, and the travel time was reduced by around 7 to 10 minutes because of through trains between the lines of Utsunomiya and Takasaki and the Main Line of Tokaido in addition to through trains that pass the Shinagawa Station on the Joban Line.

== Route ==
Graphic illustrating the Ueno-Tokyo Line route. Dashed lines show 1.3 km (0.81 mi) viaduct (now completed) to carry the Utsunomiya and Jōban Lines above the Shinkansen route (grey) which breached the original through line near Kanda Station.

Beginning from Ueno Station, the project involved re-laying about 2.5 km (1.6 mi) of existing tracks that formerly linked the two stations until separated near Kanda Station to make room for the Tōhoku Shinkansen extension to Tokyo. The gap was reconnected by a new 1.3 km (0.81 mi) top deck on the existing Shinkansen viaduct near Kanda Station with ramps at either end up from the existing formations. Provision was made during construction of the Shinkansen link for eventual restoration of through traffic on the Tohoku Lines. JR East built turnback tracks at Shinagawa Station on the Tōkaidō Line, allowing through trains from Ueno to terminate there and return north.

== Services ==
Trains on the Utsunomiya Line and Takasaki Line from Maebashi and Utsunomiya, and Jōban Line from Narita and Takahagi converge at Nippori (only trains on the Jōban Line stop here). From there, trains run non-stop between Ueno and Tokyo Station and then continue on the Tōkaidō Line towards Shinagawa (all trains departing the Jōban Line terminate here), Yokohama, Ōfuna, Hiratsuka, Kōzu, Odawara and Atami, with some additional through services to Numazu on the JR Central Tōkaidō Main Line, and Itō in the Itō Line. Initially, up to 15 services per hour ran during the morning peak, increased to 20 per hour in 2016.

Jōban Line limited express services (Hitachi limited-stop and Tokiwa semi-fast) were extended south of Ueno via the Ueno–Tokyo Line, with most services terminating at Shinagawa Station.

== History ==
The Tōhoku Main Line ran to Tokyo station both prior to and following World War II. Although the connector between Ueno and Tokyo was only used for freight trains and forwarding at first, the Allied occupation forces ran passenger trains from Tokyo Station through the Tohoku Main Line following World War II, and this was followed by a number of through services from the 1950s until the 1970s. The connection between Ueno and Tokyo was closed to passenger service in April 1973, and to freight service in January 1983; the portion of the line around Akihabara and Kanda was dismantled to provide a right-of-way to extend the Tōhoku Shinkansen to Tokyo Station, with through services to Tokyo station commencing in 1991.

A government panel recommendation in 2000 suggested restoring the connector between Ueno and Tokyo by 2015, and JR East officially announced the project on 27 March 2002.

The project received support from various local governments, particularly in Saitama Prefecture, Ibaraki Prefecture, and other areas to the north of Tokyo. However, residents of the area immediately surrounding the project cited light blockage and earthquake risk, and applied to a Tokyo court for an injunction against construction in 2007. The lawsuit was dismissed in 2012.

The project was originally scheduled to be completed in fiscal 2013, but completion was delayed by the effects of the 2011 Tōhoku earthquake and tsunami.

Beginning with the March 2022 timetable change, direct Ueno-Tokyo line services via the Utsunomiya line were truncated from Kuroiso to Utsunomiya.

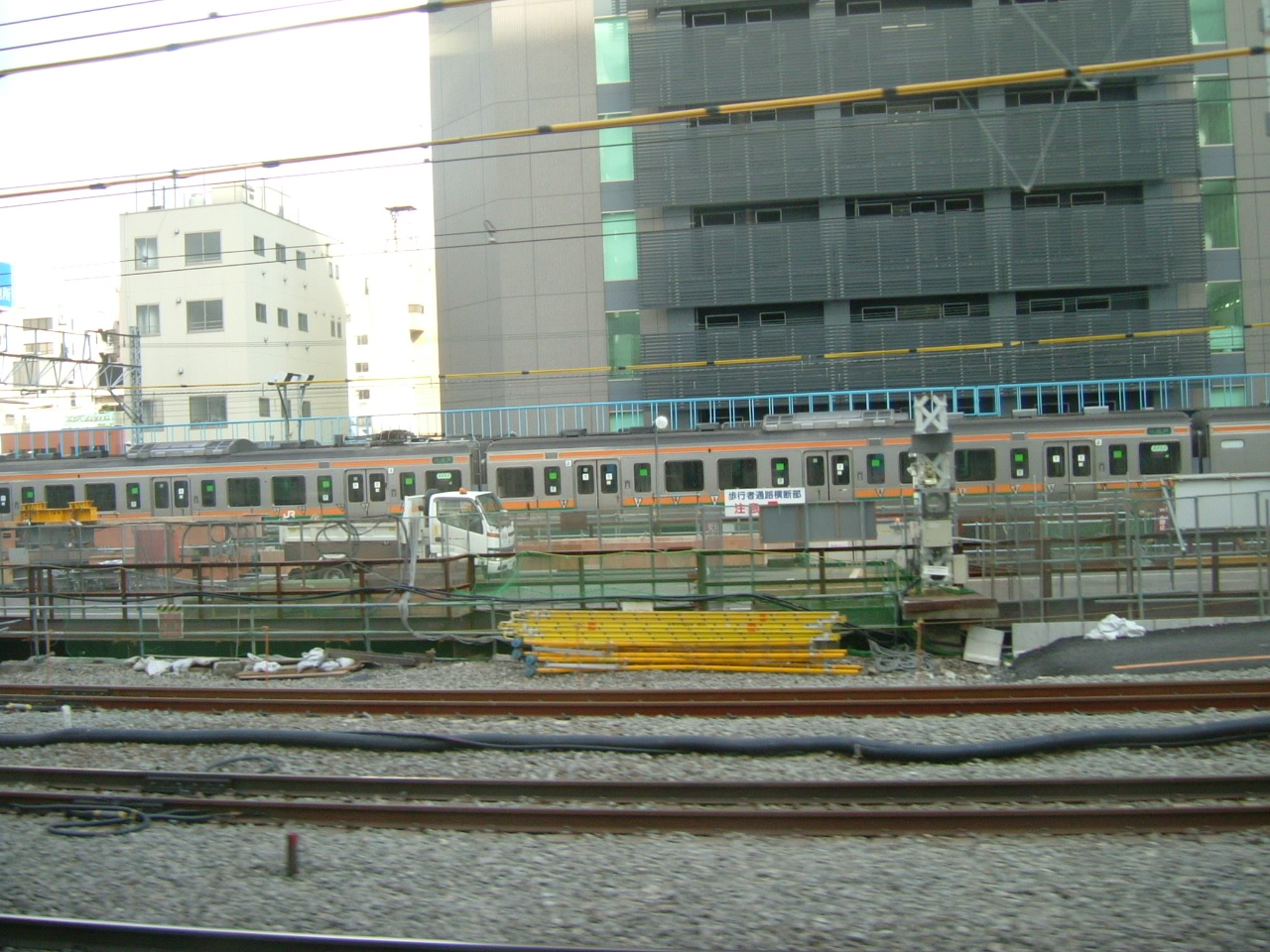
View of the planned route south of Akihabara Station in March 2007

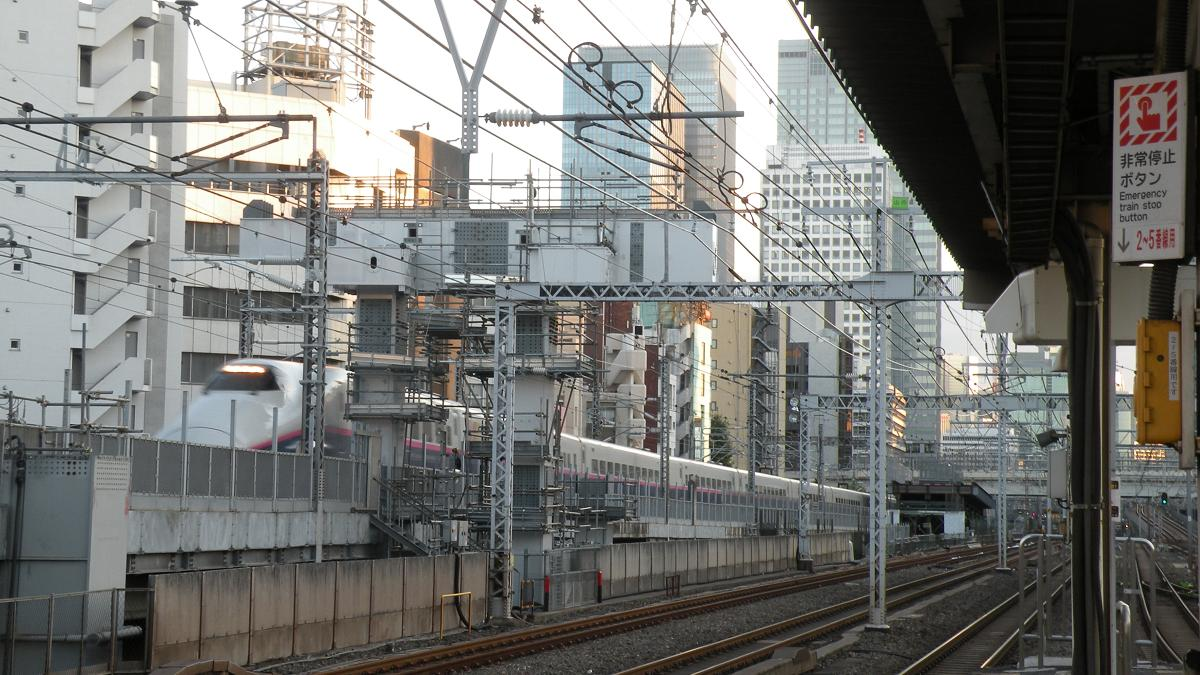
View from the platform of Kanda Station, October 2009. A bridge pylon is being built to carry a viaduct of the future Ueno–Tokyo Line. A ramp structure can be seen in the background.

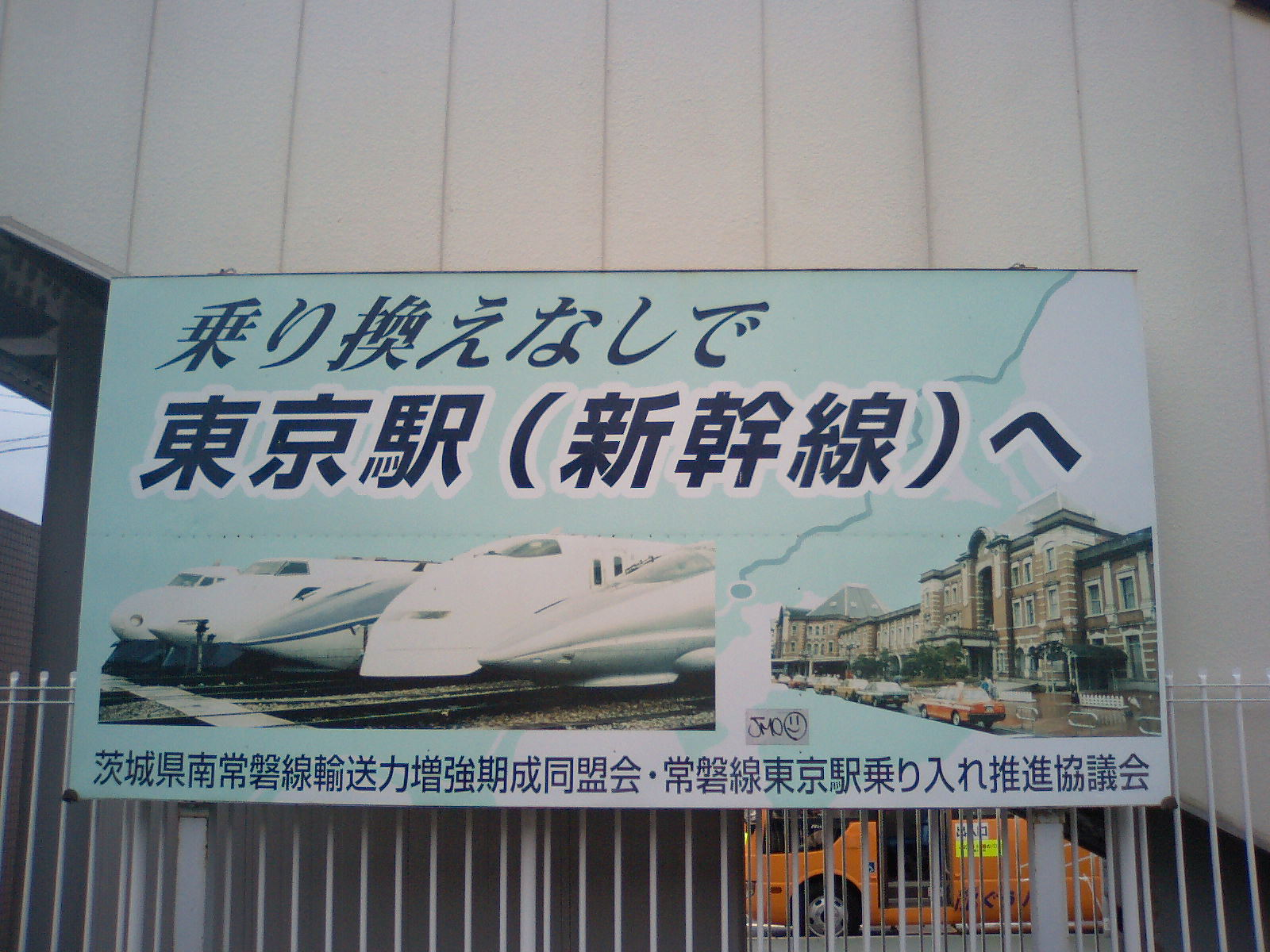
Sign at Sanuki Station on the Jōban Line promoting the early completion of the project. The headline reads Without transfer, to Tokyo Station, to the Shinkansen

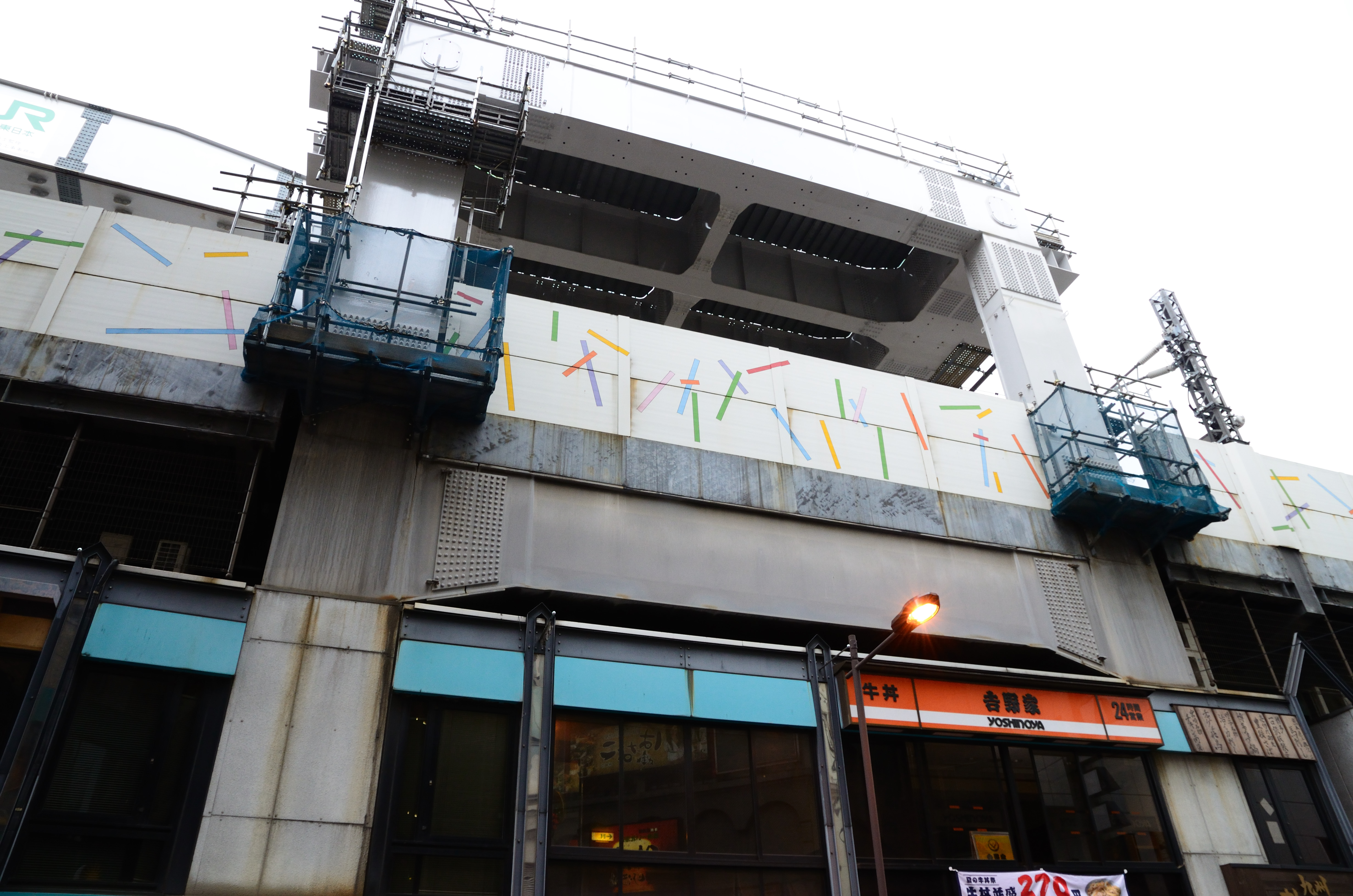
Elevated section of the Ueno–Tokyo Line under construction over the Tohoku Shinkansen tracks in August 2011

== Station list ==
Official Line Name	No.	Station	Japanese	Distance (km)		Utsunomiya/Takasaki–Tōkaidō		Jōban Line	Transfers	Locations		
Official Line Name	No.	Station	Japanese	Between stations	From Tokyo	Utsunomiya/Takasaki–Tōkaidō		Jōban Line	Transfers	Locations		
Within the Utsunomiya and Takasaki lines (through service):						Local	Rapid; Rabbit • Urban					
Tōhoku Main Line		Ōmiya	大宮	-	30.5	●	▲		Tohoku Shinkansen; Hokkaido Shinkansen; Yamagata Shinkansen; Akita Shinkansen; Joetsu Shinkansen; Hokuriku Shinkansen; Keihin-Tōhoku Line (JK47); Shōnan-Shinjuku Line (JS24); Saikyō Line (JA26); ■ Kawagoe Line; Tobu Urban Park Line (TD-01); New Shuttle	Ōmiya Ward	Saitama City	Saitama Prefecture
Tōhoku Main Line	JU06	Saitama-Shintoshin	さいたま新都心	1.6	28.9	●	↑		Keihin-Tōhoku Line (JK46)	Ōmiya Ward	Saitama City	Saitama Prefecture
Tōhoku Main Line		Urawa	浦和	4.5	24.4	●	▲		Keihin-Tōhoku Line (JK43); Shōnan-Shinjuku Line (JS23)	Urawa Ward	Saitama City	Saitama Prefecture
Tōhoku Main Line		Akabane	赤羽	11.0	13.4	●	▲		Keihin-Tōhoku Line (JK38); Shōnan-Shinjuku Line (JS22); Saikyō Line (JA15)	Kita City		Tokyo
Tōhoku Main Line	JU03	Oku	尾久	5.0	8.4	●	↑			Kita City		Tokyo
Tōhoku Main Line		Nippori	日暮里	2.6	5.8	|	↑	●	Yamanote Line (JY07); Keihin-Tōhoku Line (JK32); Keisei Main Line (KS02); Nippori-Toneri Liner	Arakawa City		Tokyo
Tōhoku Main Line	UENJU02 JJ01	Ueno	上野	2.2	3.6	●	▲	●	Tohoku Shinkansen; Hokkaido Shinkansen; Yamagata Shinkansen; Akita Shinkansen; Joetsu Shinkansen; Hokuriku Shinkansen; Yamanote Line (JY05); Keihin-Tōhoku Line (JK30); Tokyo Metro Ginza Line (G-16); Tokyo Metro Hibiya Line (H-18); Keisei Main Line (Keisei Ueno: KS01); Keisei Skyliner (Keisei Ueno: KS01)	Taitō City		Tokyo
Tōhoku Main Line	TYOJT01 JU01	Tokyo	東京	3.6	0.0	●	▲	●	Tohoku Shinkansen; Hokkaido Shinkansen; Yamagata Shinkansen; Akita Shinkansen; Joetsu Shinkansen; Hokuriku Shinkansen; Yamanote Line (JY01); Keihin-Tōhoku Line (JK26); Chūō Line (JC01); Yokosuka Line (JO19); Sōbu Line (Rapid) (JO19); Keiyō Line (JE01); Tokaido Shinkansen; Tokyo Metro Marunouchi Line (M-17)	Chiyoda City		Tokyo
Tōkaidō Main Line	TYOJT01 JU01	Tokyo	東京	3.6	0.0	●	▲	●	Tohoku Shinkansen; Hokkaido Shinkansen; Yamagata Shinkansen; Akita Shinkansen; Joetsu Shinkansen; Hokuriku Shinkansen; Yamanote Line (JY01); Keihin-Tōhoku Line (JK26); Chūō Line (JC01); Yokosuka Line (JO19); Sōbu Line (Rapid) (JO19); Keiyō Line (JE01); Tokaido Shinkansen; Tokyo Metro Marunouchi Line (M-17)	Chiyoda City		Tokyo
Tōkaidō Main Line		Shimbashi	新橋	1.9	1.9	●	▲	●	Yamanote Line (JY29); Keihin-Tōhoku Line (JK24); Yokosuka Line (JO18); Tokyo Metro Ginza Line (G-08); Toei Asakusa Line (A-10); Yurikamome (U-01)	Minato City		Tokyo
Tōkaidō Main Line		Shinagawa	品川	4.9	6.8	●	▲	●	Yamanote Line (JY25); Keihin-Tōhoku Line (JK20); Yokosuka Line (JO17); Tokaido Shinkansen; Keikyū Main Line (KK01)	Minato City		Tokyo
Tōkaidō Main Line		Kawasaki	川崎	11.4	18.2	●	▲		Keihin-Tōhoku Line (JK16); Nambu Line (JN01)	Kawasaki Ward	Kawasaki City	Kanagawa Prefecture
Tōkaidō Main Line		Yokohama	横浜	10.6	28.8	●	▲		Keihin-Tōhoku Line (JK12); Negishi Line (JK12); Yokosuka Line (JO13); Shōnan-Shinjuku Line (JS13); Tōkyū Tōyoko Line (TY21); Keikyū Main Line (KK37); Sōtetsu Main Line (SO-01); Yokohama Municipal Subway Blue Line (B20); Minatomirai Line (MM01)	Nishi Ward	Yokohama City	Kanagawa Prefecture
Tōkaidō Main Line		Totsuka	戸塚	12.1	40.9	●	▲		Yokosuka Line (JO10); Shōnan-Shinjuku Line (JS10); Yokohama Municipal Subway Blue Line (B06)	Totsuka Ward	Yokohama City	Kanagawa Prefecture
Tōkaidō Main Line		Ōfuna	大船	5.6	46.5	●	▲		Negishi Line (JK01); Yokosuka Line (JO09); Shōnan-Shinjuku Line (JS09); Shonan Monorail Enoshima Line	Kamakura City		Kanagawa Prefecture
Within the Tōkaidō line (through service):						Local	Local					

== Future developments ==
In January 2014, JR East president Tetsuro Tomita indicated that the company was considering the possibility of linking the Ueno–Tokyo Line in the future with a new direct access line to Haneda Airport also under consideration. The line started construction in 2023 and is set to be completed by 2031.

== See also ==
- Shōnan–Shinjuku Line, a similar line on the west side of Tokyo
