= Tokiwa (train) =

Japanese limited express train service

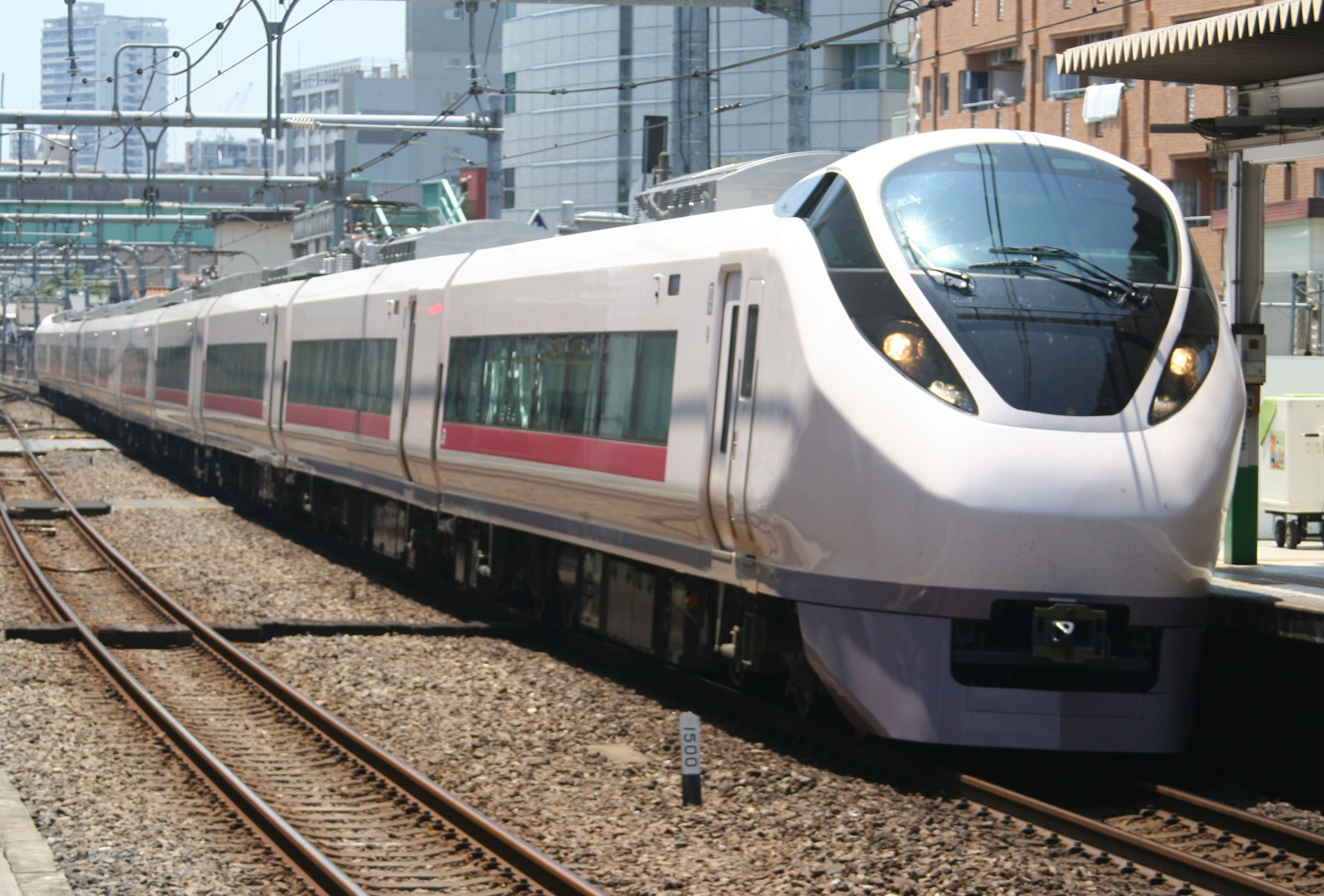
- A JR East E657 series EMU

Overview
- Service type: Limited express
- Status: Operational
- Locale: Japan
- Predecessor: Fresh Hitachi
- First service: 1 June 1958 (Semi-express); 14 March 2015 (Limited express)
- Current operator: JR East
- Former operator: JNR

Route
- Termini: Shinagawa; Takahagi
- Lines used: Ueno-Tokyo Line, Joban Line

On-board services
- Class: Standard + Green

Technical
- Rolling stock: E657 series EMUs
- Track gauge: 1,067 mm (3 ft 6 in)
- Electrification: 1,500 V DC / 20 kV AC, 50 Hz

The Tokiwa (ときわ) is a limited express service operated by East Japan Railway Company (JR East) between Shinagawa in Tokyo and Iwaki via the Joban Line and Ueno-Tokyo Line since 14 March 2015. The services replaced the former Fresh Hitachi services operated on the Joban Line between Ueno and Iwaki. The Tokiwa train service name was also formerly used for semi-express services operated by Japanese National Railways (JNR) from June 1958 until March 1985.

== Service outline ==
Tokiwa limited express services operate between Shinagawa in Tokyo and Iwaki in Fukushima Prefecture, supplementing the limited-stop Hitachi limited express services formerly named Super Hitachi. Tokiwa services are numbered from No. 51 to No. 92.

Northbound Tokiwa trains depart Ueno at mainly hourly intervals, from 7:30am to 22:30pm, and also 6:15pm, 7:15pm, 8:15pm, 10pm and 11pm (Tokiwa No. 91, the last service of the day).

21 northbound trains and 22 southbound trains operate every weekday. For northbound services, 2 trains terminate at Tsuchiura, 15 at Katsuta, 3 at Takahagi and 1 at Iwaki. For southbound services, 16 trains terminate at Shinagawa, with 6 at Ueno.

25 northbound trains and 20 southbound trains operate every Saturday, Sunday or holiday. For northbound services, 2 trains terminate at Tsuchiura, 18 at Katsuta, 4 at Takahagi and 1 at Iwaki. For southbound services, 17 trains terminate at Shinagawa, with 3 at Ueno.

== Ticketing ==
A supplementary ticket has to be purchased to board the train, along with the basic fare ticket. There are two types of such supplementary tickets, namely the Reserved Seat Ticket (座席指定券, Zaseki shitei ken), and the Unreserved Seat Ticket (座席未指定券, Zaseki mishitei ken).

The Reserved Seat Ticket enables a specified seat to be reserved for the holder. The reserved status for the seat is signified by a green overhead lamp on top of the corresponding seat.

The Unreserved Seat Ticket enables the holder to be seated on any unreserved seat. A red overhead lamp signifies that the seat is unreserved; while a yellow overhead lamp signifies that the seat is reserved for the later part of the journey, implying that one has to give up their seat to the passenger who has reserved the seat and change to another vacant seat, when they board the train later.

== Rolling stock ==
- E657 series 10-car EMUs (March 2015 –)

=== Former rolling stock ===
- KiHa 55 series DMUs (June 1955 –)
- 451 series EMUs (October 1962 – March 1985)
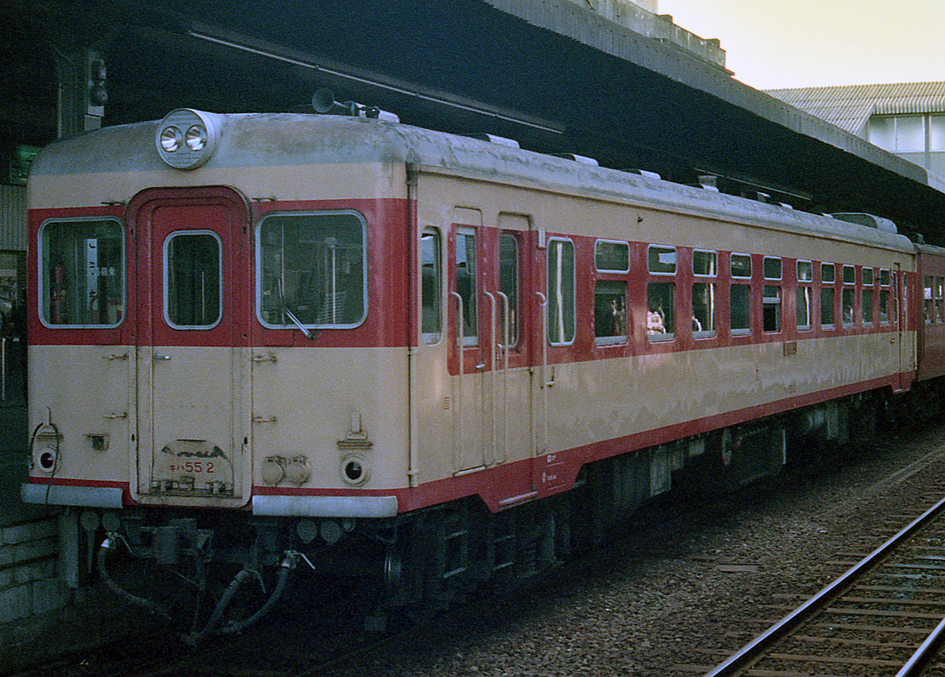
A KiHa 55 series DMU

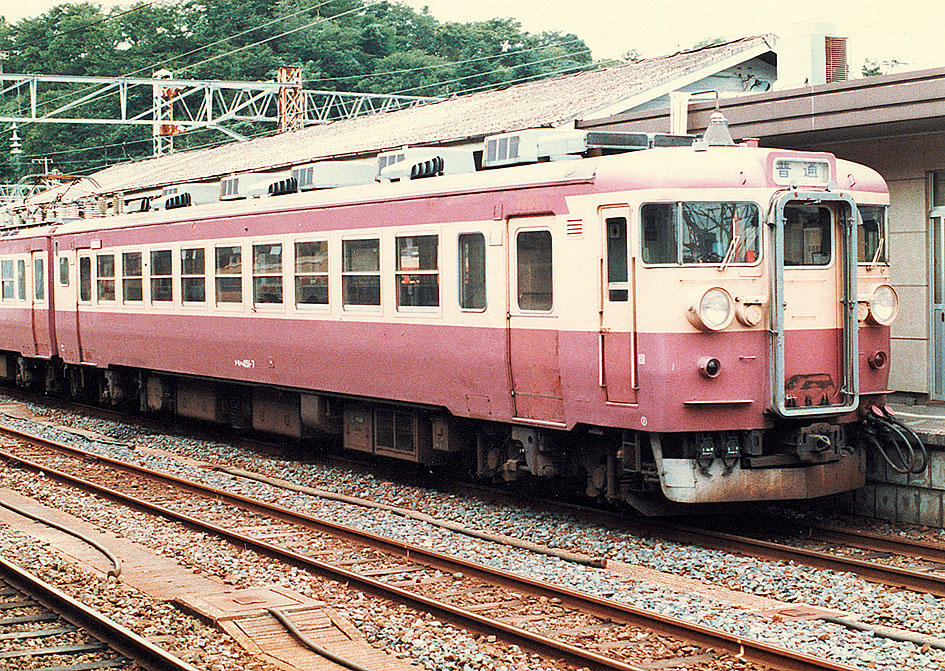
A 451 series EMU

== Formations ==
Tokiwa trains are formed as shown below, with car 1 at the Tokyo (Ueno/Shinagawa) end. All cars are no-smoking.

Car No.	1	2	3	4	5	6	7	8	9	10
Accommodation	Reserved	Reserved	Reserved	Reserved	Green	Reserved	Reserved	Reserved	Reserved	Reserved

== History ==
The name Tokiwa is the alternative pronunciation of Jōban (常磐), which refers to the combined region of the former Hitachi Province (常陸国) (now the Ibaraki Prefecture) and the Iwaki Province (磐城国) (now part of the Fukushima and Miyagi Prefectures), where the Tokiwa serves.

The original Tokiwa semi-express service was introduced on 1 June 1958, operating between Ueno in Tokyo and Taira Station (present-day Iwaki Station) in Fukushima Prefecture via the Joban Line using KiHa 55 series diesel multiple unit (DMU) trains. Three return services operated daily. Following electrification of the Joban Line, 451 series electric multiple unit (EMU) trains were introduced on some Tokiwa services from October 1962. Primarily used on Miyagino express services, these formations included buffet cars, although a buffet service was not provided on Tokiwa services.

A typical 11-car 451 series formation (without a buffet car) as used following the October 1978 timetable revision is shown below.

Car No.	1	2	3	4	5	6	7	8	9	10	11
Designation	KuHa 451	SaRo 451	MoHa 450	KuMoHa 451	SaHa 451	MoHa 450	KuMoHa 451	KuHa 451	SaRo 451	MoHa 450	KuMoHa 451

- Cars 2 and 9 were "Green" (first class) cars.

From 5 March 1966, Tokiwa services were upgraded from "semi express" to "express" status. From the start of the revised timetable on 14 March 1985, Tokiwa services were absorbed into Hitachi limited express services, and the name was discontinued.

=== Future plans ===
Effective 18 March 2023, all services in both directions will make a scheduled stop at Kashiwa Station.

== See also ==
- List of named passenger trains of Japan
