= East Japan Railway Company =

Japanese railway company

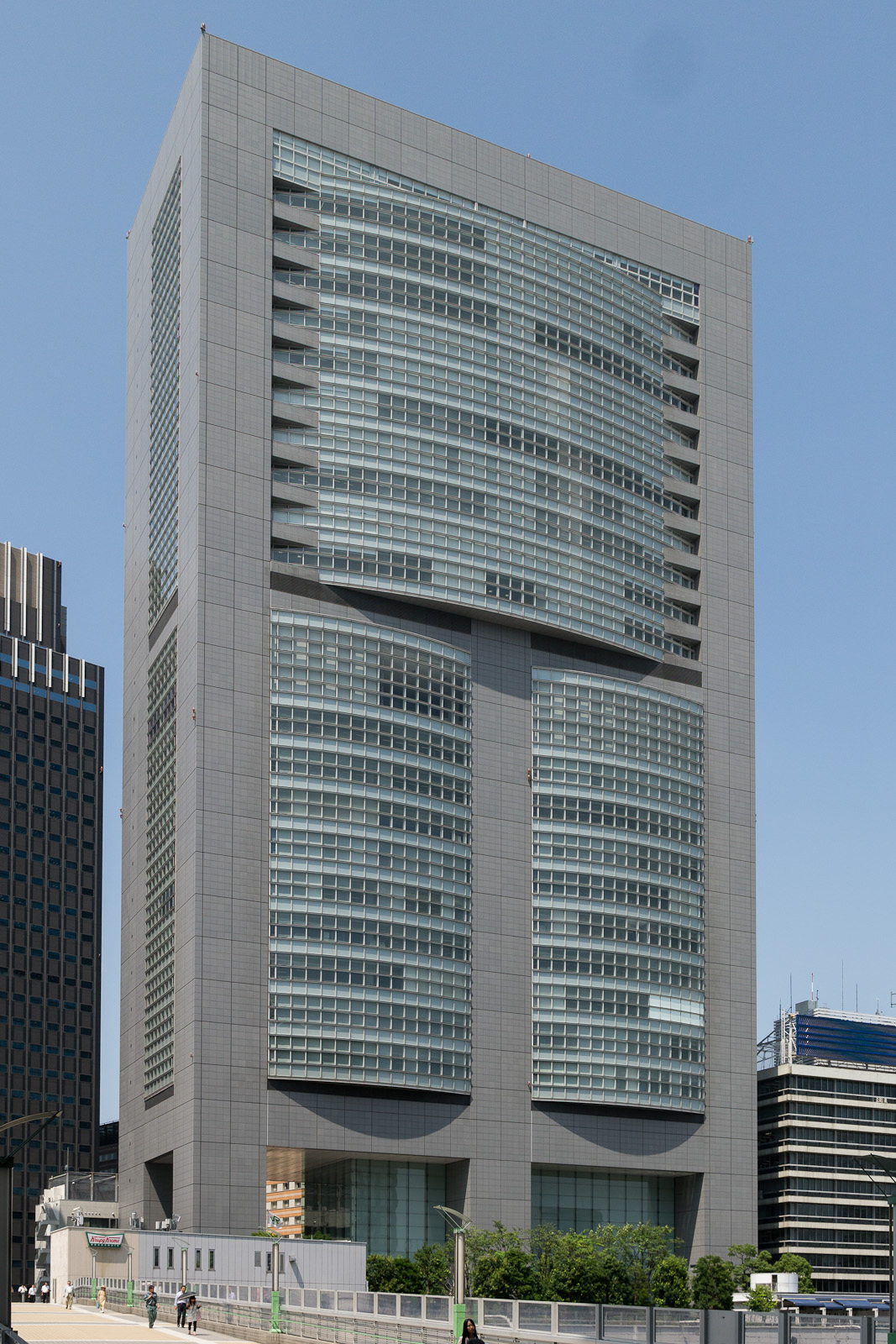
- Headquarters in Shibuya, Tokyo
- Native name: 東日本旅客鉄道株式会社
- Romanized name: Higashi-Nihon Ryokaku Tetsudō kabushiki gaisha
- Type: Public
- Traded as: TYO: 9020; Nikkei 225 component; TOPIX Large70 component
- Industry: Rail transport
- Predecessor: Japanese National Railways (JNR)
- Founded: 1 April 1987; 39 years ago, privatization of JNR
- Headquarters: 2-2-2 Yoyogi, Shibuya, Tokyo, Japan
- Area served: Kanto and Tōhoku regions Niigata, Nagano, Yamanashi and Shizuoka prefectures
- Key people: Tetsuro Tomita (chairman of the board); Masaki Ogata (vice chairman of the board); Yuji Fukasawa (president, Representative Director)
- Products: Suica (a rechargeable contactless smart card)
- Services: Passenger railways freight services bus transportation other related services
- Revenue: ▲¥2,405,538 million(FY 2023); ▲¥1,978,967 million(FY 2022); ▲¥2,756,165 million(FY 2015)
- Operating income: ▼¥140,629 million(FY 2023); ▼¥153,938 million(FY 2022); ▲¥487,821 million(FY 2016); ▲¥427,522 million(FY 2015)
- Net income: ▲¥245,310 million(FY 2016); ▼¥180,398 million(FY 2015)
- Total assets: ▲¥7,789,762 million(FY 2016); ▲¥7,605,690 million(FY 2015)
- Total equity: ▲¥2,442,129 million(FY 2016); ▲¥2,285,658 million(FY 2015)
- Owner: JTSB investment trusts (8.21%); Mizuho Bank (4.07%); TMTBJ investment trusts (3.97%); MUFG Bank (2.75%); Repurchased shares (2.67%) (as of 30 September 2018)
- Number of employees: 73,017 (as of 31 March 2013)
- Divisions: Railway operations Life-style business IT & Suica business
- Subsidiaries: 83 companies, including Tokyo Monorail and J-TREC
- Website: www.jreast.co.jp

The East Japan Railway Company (Note: Japanese: 東日本旅客鉄道株式会社, Hepburn: Higashi-Nihon Ryokaku Tetsudō kabushiki gaisha) is a major passenger railway company in Japan and the largest of the seven Japan Railways Group companies. The company name is officially abbreviated as JR East in English, and as JR Higashi-Nihon (Note: JR東日本, Jeiāru Higashi-Nihon; lit. 'JR East Japan') in Japanese. The company's headquarters are in Yoyogi, Shibuya, Tokyo, next to Shinjuku Station. It is listed in the Tokyo Stock Exchange (it formerly had secondary listings in the Nagoya and Osaka stock exchanges), is a constituent of the TOPIX Large70 index, and is one of three Japan Railways Group constituents of the Nikkei 225 index, the others being JR Central and JR West.

== History ==
JR East was incorporated on 1 April 1987 after being spun off from the government-run Japanese National Railways (JNR). The spin-off was nominally "privatization", as the company was actually a wholly owned subsidiary of the government-owned JNR Settlement Corporation for several years, and was not completely sold to the public until 2002.

Following the breakup, JR East ran the operations on former JNR lines in the Greater Tokyo Area, the Tōhoku region, and surrounding areas.

== Lines ==
Railway lines of JR East primarily serve the Kanto and Tohoku regions, along with adjacent areas in Kōshin'etsu region (Niigata, Nagano, Yamanashi) and Shizuoka prefectures.

=== Shinkansen ===
JR East operates all of the Shinkansen high-speed rail lines north of Tokyo, with the exception of the Hokkaido Shinkansen which is operated by JR Hokkaido.

- Tōhoku Shinkansen (Tokyo - Shin-Aomori)
- Jōetsu Shinkansen (Tokyo - Niigata; Echigo-Yuzawa - Gala Yuzawa)
- Hokuriku Shinkansen (jointly operated with JR West) (Tokyo - Jōetsumyōkō)
- Yamagata Shinkansen (Tokyo - Shinjo)
- Akita Shinkansen (Tokyo - Akita)

The Tokyo–Osaka Tōkaidō Shinkansen is owned and operated by the Central Japan Railway Company (JR Central), although it stops at several JR East stations.

=== Kanto region ===
These lines have sections inside the Tokyo suburban area (Japanese: 東京近郊区間) designated by JR East. This does not necessarily mean that the lines are fully inside the Greater Tokyo Area.

- ■ Agatsuma Line (Shibukawa - Ōmae)
- Chūō Main Line (Tokyo - Shiojiri)
- Chūō Rapid Line (Tokyo - Ōtsuki)
- Chūō-Sōbu Line (Mitaka - Chiba)
- ■ Hachikō Line (Hachiōji - Kuragano)
- Itō Line (Atami - Ajiro - Itō)
- Itsukaichi Line (Haijima - Musashi-Itsukaichi)
- Jōban Line (Ueno - Iwaki)
- ■ Jōetsu Line (Takasaki - Minakami)
- ■ Karasuyama Line (Hōshakuji - Ōgane - Karasuyama)
- ■ Kashima Line (Katori - Kashima Soccer Stadium)
- ■ ■ Kawagoe Line (Ōmiya - Komagawa)
- Keihin–Tōhoku Line (Ōmiya - Ōfuna)
- Keiyō Line (Tokyo - Soga; Ichikawa-Shiohama - Nishi-Funabashi; Minami-Funabashi - Nishi-Funabashi)
- ■ Kururi Line (Kisarazu - Kazusa-Kameyama)
- ■ Mito Line (Oyama - Tomobe)
- Musashino Line (Fuchū-Hommachi - Nishi-Funabashi) (Tokyo outer loop)
- Nambu Line (Kawasaki - Tachikawa; Shitte - Hamakawasaki)
- ■ Narita Line (Sakura - Chōshi; Abiko - Narita; Narita - Narita Airport)
- Negishi Line (Yokohama - Ōfuna)
- ■ Nikkō Line (Utsunomiya - Nikkō)
- Ōme Line (Tachikawa - Okutama)
- ■ Ryōmō Line (Oyama - Shin-Maebashi)
- ■ Sagami Line (Hashimoto - Chigasaki)
- Saikyō Line (Ōsaki - Ōmiya)
- Shōnan–Shinjuku Line (Shin-Maebashi - Odawara; Utsunomiya - Zushi)
- ■ Sōbu Main Line (Chiba - Chōshi)
- ■ Sotobō Line (Chiba - Awa-Kamogawa)
- Takasaki Line (Ōmiya - Takasaki)
- ■ Tōgane Line (Narutō - Ōami)
- Tōhoku Main Line (Utsunomiya Line) (Ueno - Kuroiso)
- Tōkaidō Main Line (Tokyo - Atami)
- Tsurumi Line (Tsurumi - Ōgimachi; Anzen - Ōkawa; Asano - Umi-Shibaura)
- ■ Uchibō Line (Soga - Awa-Kamogawa)
- ■ Ueno–Tokyo Line (Maebashi - Numazu; Utsunomiya - Numazu; Atami - Itō; Takahagi - Shinagawa; Narita - Abiko)
- Yamanote Line (Loop line)
- Yokohama Line (Higashi-Kanagawa - Hachiōji)
- Yokosuka Line (Tokyo - Kurihama)

=== Koshinetsu region ===
- Chūō Main Line (Nirasaki - Shiojiri; Okaya - Midoriko Siojiri)
- ■ Echigo Line (Niigata - Kashiwazaki)
- ■ Hakushin Line (Niigata - Shibata)
- ■ Iiyama Line (Toyono - Echigo-Kawaguchi)
- ■ Joetsu Line (Minakami - Miyauchi; Echigo-Yuzawa - Gala-Yuzawa)
- ■ Koumi Line (Kobuchizawa - Komoro)
- ■ Oito Line (Matsumoto - Minami-Otari)
- Shinetsu Main Line (Takasaki - Yokokawa; Shinonoi - Niigata)
- Shinonoi Line (Shinonoi - Shiojiri)
- ■ Yahiko Line (Higashi-Sanjo - Yahiko)

=== Tohoku region ===
- ■ Aterazawa Line (Kita-Yamagata - Aterazawa)
- ■ Ban'etsu East Line (Iwaki - Koriyama)
- ■ Ban'etsu West Line (Koriyama - Niitsu)
- ■ Gonō Line (Higashi-Noshiro - Kawabe)
- ■ Hachinohe Line (Hachinohe - Kuji)
- ■ Hanawa Line (Odate - Koma)
- ■ Ishinomaki Line (Kogota - Onagawa)
- ■ Jōban Line (Iwaki - Iwanuma)
- ■ Kamaishi Line (Hanamaki - Kamaishi)
- ■ Kesennuma Line (Maeyachi - Kesennuma)
- ■ Kitakami Line (Kitakami - Yokote)
- ■ Ofunato Line (Ichinoseki - Sakari)
- ■ Oga Line (Oiwake - Oga)
- ■ Ominato Line (Noheji - Ominato)
- ■ Ōu Main Line (Fukushima - Aomori) (Yamagata Line, Fukushima - Shinjō)
- ■ Rikuu East Line (Kogota - Shinjo)
- ■ Rikuu West Line (Shinjo - Amarume)
- ■ Senseki Line (Aobadori - Ishinomaki)
- ■ Senseki-Tōhoku Line
- ■ Senzan Line (Sendai - Uzen-Chitose)
- ■ Suigun Line (Mito - Asaka-Nagamori; Kamisugaya - Hitachi-Ota)
- ■ Tadami Line (Aizu-Wakamatsu - Koide)
- ■ Tazawako Line (Morioka - Ōmagari)
- ■ Tohoku Main Line (Kuroiso - Morioka; Iwakiri - Rifu)
- ■ Tsugaru Line (Aomori - Mimmaya)
- ■ Uetsu Main Line (Niitsu - Akita)
- ■ Yamada Line (Morioka - Miyako)
- ■ Yonesaka Line (Yonezawa - Sakamachi)

== Services ==
Below is the full list of limited express and express train services operated on JR East lines as of 2025.

=== Shinkansen ===
- Asama
- Hakutaka
- Hayabusa
- Hayate
- Kagayaki
- Komachi
- Nasuno
- Tanigawa
- Toki
- Tsubasa
- Yamabiko

=== Limited express (daytime) ===
- Akagi
- Azusa
- Fuji Excursion
- Hitachi and Tokiwa
- Inaho
- Kaiji/View Kaiji
- Kusatsu·Shima
- Narita Express
- Nikkō and Kinugawa
- Saphir Odoriko/Odoriko
- Sazanami
- Shirayuki
- Shiosai
- Shōnan
- Tsugaru
- Wakashio

=== Limited express (overnight) ===
- Sunrise Izumo/Sunrise Seto (not operated by JR East, operated by JR Central and JR-West over the Tokaido Main Line, part of which JR East owns between Tokyo and Atami)
- Train Suite Shiki-shima
- Cassiopeia (Retired)
- Hokutosei (Retired)

== Cargo transport ==
JR East operates "Hakobyun", a priority cargo transport service on its Shinkansen lines. The service is intended for high-value, delicate, and time-sensitive goods such as precision equipment and premium fresh seafood, offering faster delivery times and smoother handling than conventional freight trains. Any Shinkansen train can carry up to 40 boxes of commercial cargo using storage areas located between cars. On selected services, one or more cars may be closed to passengers and used for cargo transport, with boxes loaded onto specially designed carts that fit between seats. JR East also operates a converted E3 series trainset with all seating removed for dedicated cargo use. Hakobyun services operate on the Akita, Hokuriku, Hokkaidō, Jōetsu, Tōhoku, and Yamagata Shinkansen lines. Small consignments can be loaded and unloaded at any station along the route, while larger volumes must be handled at designated cargo terminals.

== Stations ==
During Japanese fiscal year 2024, the busiest stations in the JR East network by average daily passenger count were:

1. Shinjuku (666,809)
2. Ikebukuro (499,128)
3. Tokyo (434,564)
4. Yokohama (373,010)
5. Shibuya (324,414)
6. Shinagawa (287,939)
7. Ōmiya (254,220)
8. Shimbashi (231,628)
9. Akihabara (221,421)
10. Kita-Senju (198,732)

== Subsidiaries ==
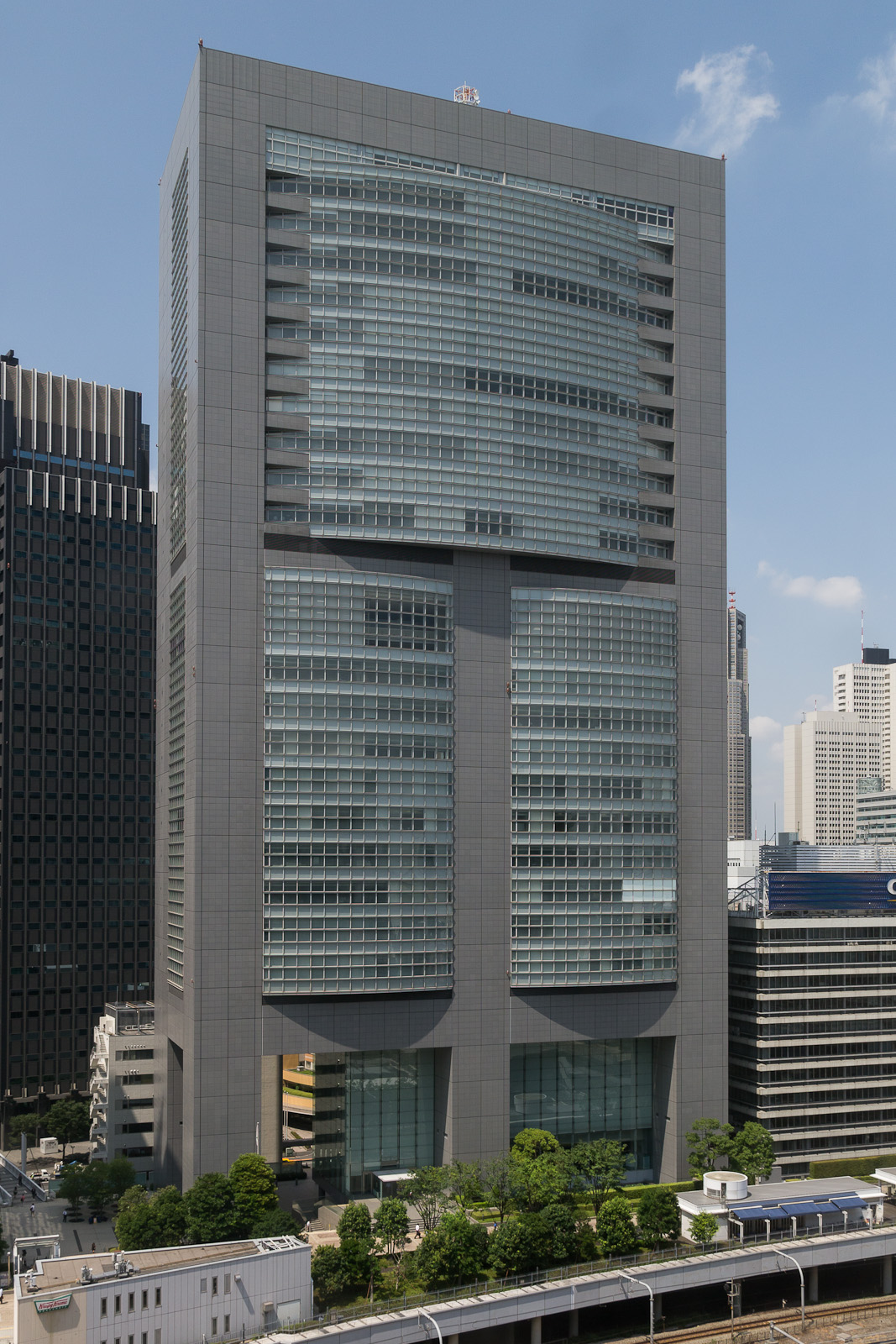
JR East headquarters (JR東日本本社ビル), located near Shinjuku Station in Tokyo

- Higashi-Nihon Kiosk - provides newspapers, drinks and other items in station kiosks and operates the Newdays convenience store chain
- JR Bus Kanto / JR Bus Tohoku - intercity bus operators
- Nippon Restaurant Enterprise - provides bentō box lunches on trains and in train stations
- Tokyo Monorail - (70% ownership stake)
- Saitama New Urban Transit Co., Ltd (40%)
- East Japan Marketing & Communications

== Sponsorship ==
JR East co-sponsors the JEF United Chiba J-League football club, which was formed by a merger between the JR East and Furukawa Electric company teams.

== Carbon emission plan ==
JR East aims to reduce its carbon emissions by half, as measured over the period 1990–2030. This would be achieved by increasing the efficiency of trains and company-owned thermal power stations and by developing hybrid trains.

== Culture foundation ==
The East Japan Railway Culture Foundation is a non-profit organization established by JR East for the purpose of developing a "richer railway culture". The Railway Museum in Saitama is operated by the foundation.

== Bids outside Japan ==
JR East held a 15% shareholding in West Midlands Trains with Abellio and Mitsui that commenced operating the West Midlands franchise in England in December 2017. JR East sold their stake to Abellio in September 2021. The same consortium were also listed to be bidding for the South Eastern franchise.
