= Shikihide stable =

Organization of sumo wrestlers

Coordinates: 35.9349°N 140.1401°E

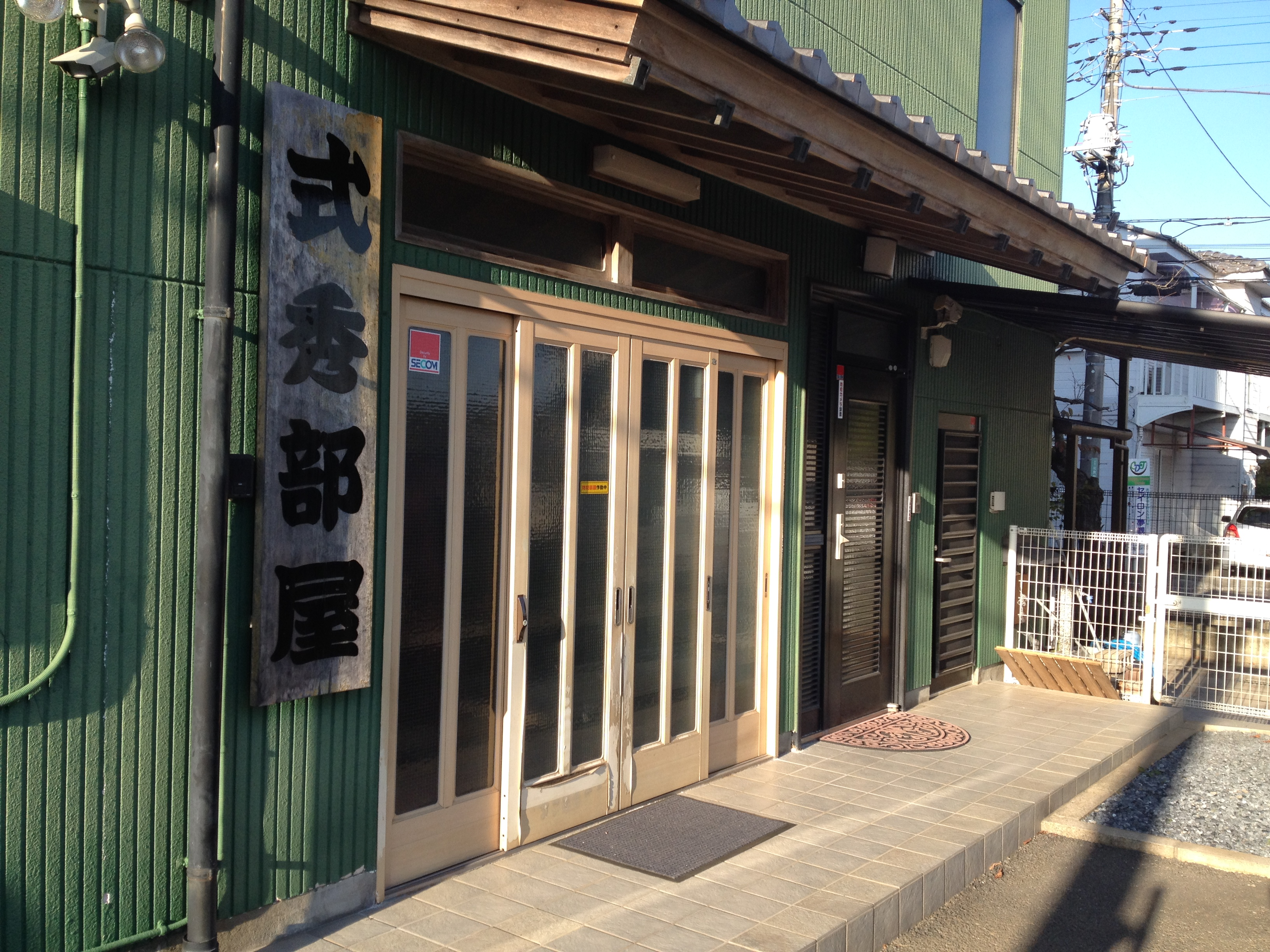

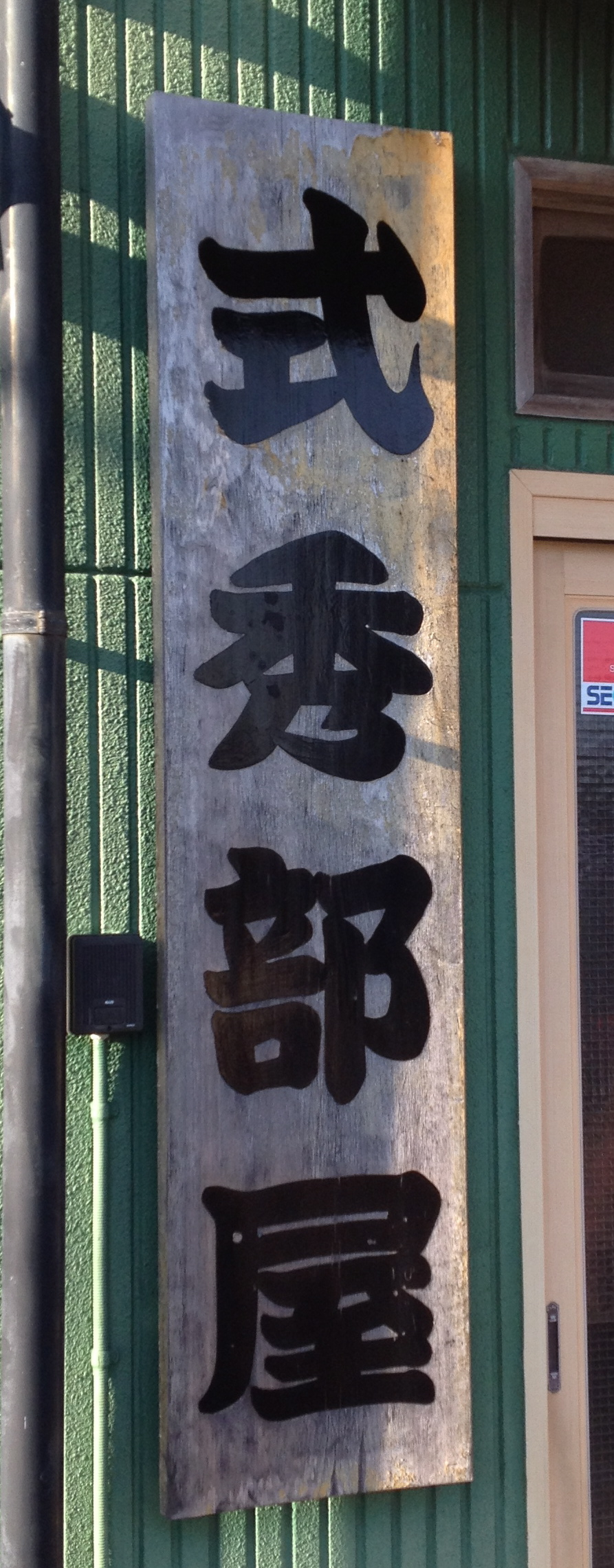

Shikihide stable (式秀部屋, Shikihide-beya), full name Shikimori Hidegoro stable, is a stable of sumo wrestlers, part of the Dewanoumi ichimon or group of stables. It was set up in 1992 by former komusubi Ōshio. The stable did not produce a sekitori until 2012, when his top wrestler Senshō of Mongolia finally won promotion to the jūryō division in the January tournament after eleven years in sumo. The nineteen years and nine months Shikihide stable took to produce a sekitori is the longest by a newly established stable since World War II. Former maegashira Kitazakura took over as Shikihide in January 2013 when his predecessor reached 65 years of age. It is situated in Ibaraki Prefecture, and along with Tatsunami stable is one of the stables furthest away from sumo's heartland of Ryōgoku.

As of May 2026, the stable has 10 active wrestlers.

All members of Shikihide stable have to complete their high school education, and Shikihide has also introduced yoga to his wrestlers after they have finished training for the day. The stable is known for its "open door" policy, allowing anyone who can meet the entry requirements to join regardless of ability. It has several relatively small wrestlers such as Omote weighing only 67 kg (148 lb) and Baraki just 164 cm (5 ft 4 1/2 in) tall. In 2014 a wrestler named Sodachizakari reportedly had to drink several bottles of water to meet the minimum weight requirement. 16 of its 20 wrestlers have yet to make it past the bottom two divisions of jonokuchi and jonidan.

Shikihide was in poor health for much of 2020, and his wife in her role as okamisan took an increasing role in running the stable, even overseeing training. Half the stable's wrestlers ran away in early August 2020, complaining about her strict behavior and invasions of their privacy. They were persuaded to return, and although no violence was involved the Sumo Association's compliance committee is continuing to investigate and interview the wrestlers involved.

In April 2025, the stable's 33 year-old jonidan-ranked wrestler Wakatozakura died from necrotizing fasciitis (flesh-eating disease), the first active wrestler to die since April 2021.

== Ring name conventions ==
Some wrestlers at this stable take ring names or shikona that end with the character 桜 (read: sakura or zakura), in deference to their coach and the stable's owner, the former Kitazakura. Examples include Wakatozakura, Abezakura, and Shōnanzakura. The last named (previously known as Hattorizakura) has attracted some attention for his persistence in the face of an almost complete lack of success: as of January 2020, Shonanzakura had recorded only three wins in 180 bouts, and once had to be told by the ringside judges to fight properly after he repeatedly tried to lose to an opponent by deliberately falling down without being touched.

== Owners ==
- 2013–present: 9th Shikimori Hidegorō - abbreviated to Shikihide (iin, maegashira Kitazakura, born 1971)
- 1992–2013: 8th Shikimori Hidegorō (komusubi Ōshio, 1948–2024)

== Notable active wrestlers ==
- None

== Notable former wrestlers ==
- Senshō (best rank jūryō 1, born 1983)
- Shōnanzakura (notable for prolonged losing streak, born 1998)

== Referee ==
- Kimura Sakuranosuke (makushita gyōji, real name Shōnosuke Kurihara, born 1999)

== Hairdresser ==
- Tokohide (second class tokoyama, born 1977)

== Location and access ==
Ibaraki prefecture, Ryugasaki City, Sanuki 4-17-17
10 minute walk from Sanuki Station on the Jōban Line

== See also ==
- List of sumo stables
- List of active sumo wrestlers
- List of past sumo wrestlers
- Glossary of sumo terms
