= Ushiku Station =

Railway station in Ushiku, Ibaraki Prefecture, Japan

Ushiku Station 牛久駅
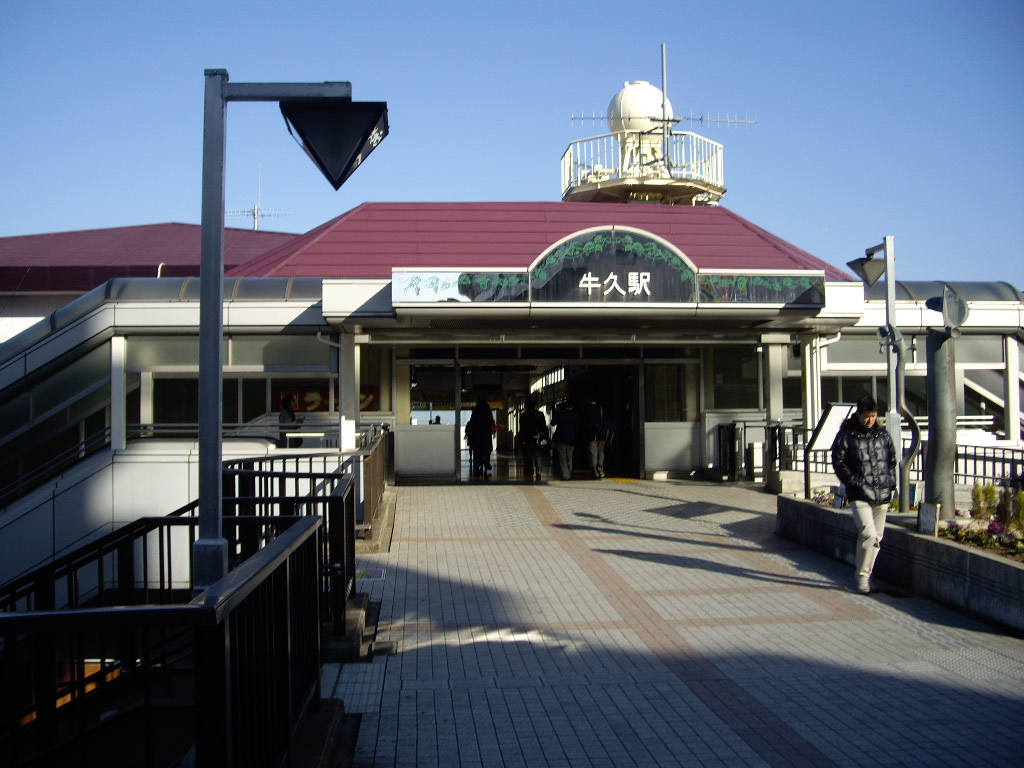
- Ushiku Station, March 2010

General information
- Location: Ushiku-cho 282, Ushiku-shi, Ibaraki-ken 300-1221; Japan
- Coordinates: 35°58′32.97″N 140°08′27.54″E
- Operator: JR East
- Line: ■ Jōban Line
- Distance: 50.6 km from Nippori
- Platforms: 2 side platforms

Other information
- Status: Staffed (Midori no Madoguchi )
- Website: Official website

History
- Opened: 25 December 1896

Passengers
- FY2019: 12,444 daily

Services
Preceding station	JR East	Following station
Ryūgasakishi towards Shinagawa	Tokiwa	Hitachino-Ushiku (limited service) towards Takahagi
Ryūgasakishi towards Shinagawa	Jōban Line Special Rapid	Hitachino-Ushiku towards Tsuchiura
Ryūgasakishi towards Shinagawa	Jōban Line Local-Futsuu	Hitachino-Ushiku towards Sendai
Location
- Location within Ibaraki Prefecture Location within Japan

Ushiku Station (牛久駅, Ushiku-eki) is a passenger railway station located in the city of Ushiku, Ibaraki Prefecture, Japan operated by the East Japan Railway Company (JR East).

== Lines ==
Ushiku Station is served by the Jōban Line, and is located 50.6 km from the official starting point of the line at Nippori Station.

== Station layout ==
The station consists of two opposed side platforms, connected to the elevated station building by a footbridge. The station has a Midori no Madoguchi staffed ticket office.

=== Platforms ===
1	■ Jōban Line	for Tsuchiura, Ishioka, Mito, Takahagi and Iwaki
1	■ Jōban Line (Tokiwa Limited Express)	for Tsuchiura, Ishioka, Mito, Takahagi
2	■ Jōban Line (Tokiwa Limited Express)	for Ueno, Tokyo and Shinagawa
2	■ Jōban Line ( Ueno-Tokyo Line)	for Toride, Kashiwa, Matsudo, Ueno, Tokyo and Shinagawa

== History ==
Ushiku Station was opened on 25 December 1896. The current station building was completed in July 1984. The station was absorbed into the JR East network upon the privatization of the Japanese National Railways (JNR) on 1 April 1987.

== Passenger statistics ==
In fiscal 2019, the station was used by an average of 12,444 passengers daily (boarding passengers only).

== Surrounding area ==
- Ushiku City Hall
- Ushiku Post Office
- National Route 6

== See also ==
- List of railway stations in Japan
