= Ōshio Kenji =

Sumo wrestler (1948–2024)

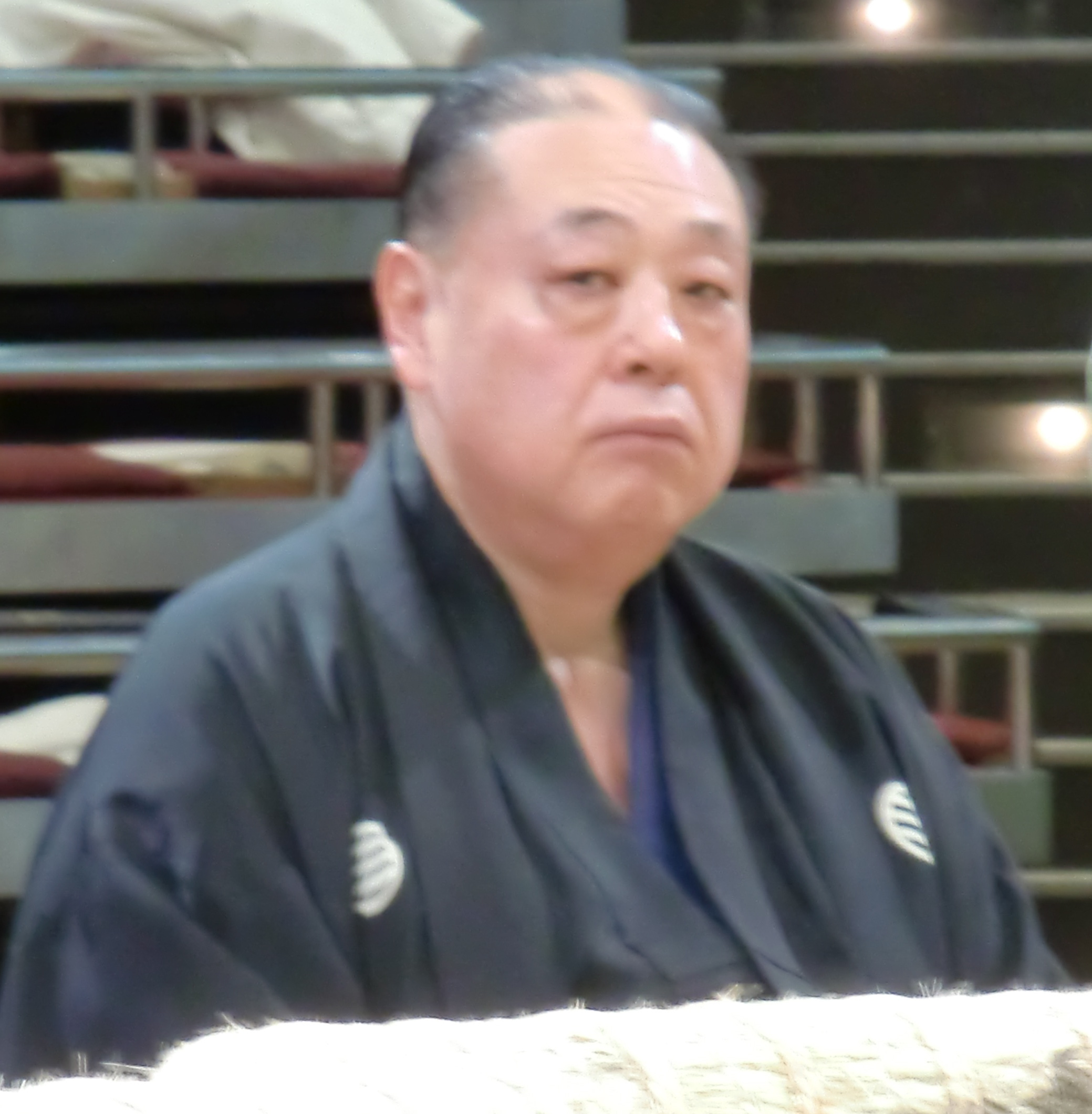
- Ōshio in 2010

Personal information
- Native name: 大潮 憲司
- Born: Kenji Hatano; 4 January 1948 Kitakyushu, Fukuoka, Japan
- Died: 25 May 2024 (aged 76)
- Height: 1.86 m (6 ft 1 in)
- Weight: 134 kg (295 lb)

Sport
- Sport: Sumo
- Retired: January 1988
- Heya: Tokitsukaze
- Record: 964-929-47
- Debut: January 1962
- Highest rank: Komusubi (January 1978)
- Elder name: Shikihide
- Championships: 3 (Jūryō)
- Special Prizes: 1 (Fighting Spirit); 1 (Technique)
- Gold Stars: 3 Kitanoumi (2); Wajima
- Updated on June 2020

Ōshio Kenji (born Kenji Hatano; 4 January 1948 – 25 May 2024) was a Japanese sumo wrestler from Kitakyushu. His highest rank was komusubi. His career lasted twenty-six years, from 1962 until 1988, and he holds the record for the most bouts contested in professional sumo. After his retirement at the age of 40 he became an elder of the Japan Sumo Association and set up Shikihide stable in 1992. He left the Sumo Association upon turning 65 in 2013. He died in 2024.

== Career ==
Ōshio Kenji was born in Yahata Higashi ward. He made his professional debut in January 1962 at the age of just 14, joining Tokitsukaze stable. During his first year he also attended Ryogoku Junior High School to complete his compulsory education. His first stablemaster was the former yokozuna Futabayama. He initially fought under his own surname, Hatano, before adopting the shikona of Ōshio in 1969.

He reached the second highest jūryō division in November 1969 and was promoted to the top makuuchi division for the first time in September 1971. He reached his top rank of komusubi in January 1978, but held it for only one tournament. In the May 1978 tournament he defeated Wajima on the opening day, his first ever victory over a yokozuna. He was to earn two more kinboshi in September 1982 and January 1983, at the age of 35. He also earned two special prizes, for Technique and Fighting Spirit.

During his extraordinarily long career, Ōshio was ranked in makuuchi for 51 tournaments and 55 tournaments in jūryō, for a total of 106 ranked as an elite sekitori wrestler, a record that stood until 2002 when it was broken by Terao. His total of jūryō tournaments is a record he shares with Hachiya. He also holds the "elevator" record for winning promotion to makuuchi from jūryō a total of 13 times, The longest he was able to stay in the top division consecutively was 18 tournaments between January 1981 and November 1983.

He fell from makuuchi for the last time in May 1984, and announced his retirement in January 1988 at the age of forty after falling into the non-salaried makushita division. He had competed in 157 tournaments, and had fought a total of 1891 career bouts, the latter of which is an all-time record. His total of 964 career wins was also a record at the time, although it was surpassed by Chiyonofuji less than two years later, in September 1989.

== Retirement from sumo ==
Ōshio remained in the sumo world as an elder of the Japan Sumo Association and set up Shikihide stable in May 1992. He did not produce a sekitori until 2012, when his top wrestler Senshō of Mongolia finally won promotion to jūryō in the January tournament after eleven years in sumo. The nineteen years and nine months Shikihide stable took to produce a sekitori is the longest by a newly established stable since World War II. (Senshō also took longer to reach the sekitori ranks than any other foreign recruit since WWII.) He stood down as the head of the stable in December 2012 as he was shortly to reach the mandatory retirement age of 65, and passed over control to the former maegashira Kitazakura. Unusually, Kitazakura belongs to a different ichimon, Dewanoumi, but there was a personal connection as Ōshio was a close friend of Kitazakura′s father.

His son Koichi was born in 1984 and joined Shikihide stable in 1999, fighting under the name of Tamahikari. He reached a highest rank of sandanme 87 before retiring in 2011 after 12 years in sumo.

Ōshio died on 25 May 2024 at the age of 76. His death was announced by the Sumo Association on 1 June.

== Fighting style ==
Ōshio's preferred grip on his opponent's mawashi was hidari-yotsu, a right hand outside, left hand inside position. His most commonly used kimarite at sekitori level was yori-kiri, a straightforward force out, which was used in around 30 percent of his victories. He also won frequently with oshi-dashi (push out), yori taoshi (force out and down) and uwatenage (overarm throw).

== Career record ==
Ōshio Kenji
Year	January Hatsu basho, Tokyo	March Haru basho, Osaka	May Natsu basho, Tokyo	July Nagoya basho, Nagoya	September Aki basho, Tokyo	November Kyūshū basho, Fukuoka
1962	(Maezumo)	East Jonokuchi #21; 2–5	East Jonokuchi #11; 4–3	West Jonidan #72; 3–4	West Jonidan #76; 3–4	West Jonidan #77; 6–1
1963	East Jonidan #24; 4–3	East Sandanme #85; 3–4	East Jonidan #10; 2–5	East Jonidan #39; 5–2	East Sandanme #92; 3–4	East Jonidan #7; 4–3
1964	West Sandanme #82; 3–4	East Sandanme #87; 5–2	West Sandanme #53; 5–2	East Sandanme #24; 3–4	West Sandanme #32; 4–3	East Sandanme #19; 4–3
1965	East Sandanme #8; 5–2	East Makushita #74; 3–4	East Makushita #80; 4–3	West Makushita #76; 4–3	West Makushita #69; 5–2	East Makushita #46; 4–3
1966	West Makushita #41; 4–3	West Makushita #38; 6–1	West Makushita #15; 3–4	West Makushita #17; 4–3	East Makushita #13; 2–5	East Makushita #24; 3–4
1967	East Makushita #28; 3–4	West Makushita #31; 4–3	East Makushita #31; 5–2	West Makushita #17; 4–3	East Makushita #14; 4–3	East Makushita #10; 4–3
1968	West Makushita #7; 4–3	East Makushita #6; 4–3	East Makushita #2; 3–4	East Makushita #5; 3–4	West Makushita #8; 5–2	East Makushita #3; 4–3
1969	West Makushita #2; 4–3	West Makushita #1; 4–3	East Makushita #1; 2–5	East Makushita #8; 5–2	West Makushita #1; 5–2	East Jūryō #13; 9–6
1970	West Jūryō #8; 7–8	West Jūryō #10; 8–7	East Jūryō #7; 10–5	East Jūryō #3; 5–10	West Jūryō #10; 8–7	West Jūryō #8; 8–7
1971	West Jūryō #4; 7–8	West Jūryō #7; 9–6	East Jūryō #5; 11–4–P; Champion	East Jūryō #1; 9–6	West Maegashira #12; 6–9	West Jūryō #1; 9–6
1972	West Maegashira #11; 6–9	East Jūryō #2; 9–6	East Maegashira #12; 4–6–5	East Jūryō #5; Sat out due to injury 0–0–15	East Jūryō #5; 9–6	West Jūryō #1; 11–4–P
1973	East Maegashira #10; 8–7	East Maegashira #7; 6–9	West Maegashira #11; 6–9	East Jūryō #1; 10–5	East Maegashira #11; 6–9	West Jūryō #2; 9–6
1974	West Jūryō #1; 10–5	West Maegashira #10; 6–9	West Jūryō #1; 6–9	East Jūryō #4; 8–7	East Jūryō #1; 9–6	West Maegashira #12; 7–8
1975	West Maegashira #14; 7–8	West Jūryō #1; 9–6	East Maegashira #14; 7–8	East Jūryō #1; 9–6	West Maegashira #10; 7–8	West Maegashira #11; 6–9
1976	East Jūryō #1; 9–6	East Maegashira #13; 10–5	East Maegashira #4; 5–10	East Maegashira #9; 8–7	West Maegashira #7; 8–7	West Maegashira #3; 6–9
1977	East Maegashira #6; 6–9	East Maegashira #10; 7–8	East Maegashira #11; 9–6	West Maegashira #5; 8–7	West Maegashira #1; 6–9	East Maegashira #3; 9–6; T
1978	East Komusubi #1; 3–12	East Maegashira #6; 10–5	East Maegashira #1; 5–10 ★	East Maegashira #6; 5–10	West Maegashira #10; 7–8	West Maegashira #11; 5–10
1979	East Jūryō #4; 11–4–P; Champion	West Maegashira #11; 1–2–12	West Jūryō #7; Sat out due to injury 0–0–15	East Makushita #5; 4–3	West Makushita #1; 5–2	West Jūryō #3; 9–6
1980	West Jūryō #7; 8–7	West Jūryō #6; 8–7	East Jūryō #5; 7–8	East Jūryō #7; 7–8	East Jūryō #9; 10–5	East Jūryō #3; 12–3; Champion
1981	West Maegashira #10; 8–7	West Maegashira #6; 6–9	West Maegashira #8; 8–7	East Maegashira #6; 7–8	West Maegashira #6; 7–8	East Maegashira #7; 7–8
1982	East Maegashira #8; 8–7	East Maegashira #3; 4–11	East Maegashira #10; 8–7	East Maegashira #6; 8–7	West Maegashira #2; 4–11 ★	West Maegashira #8; 10–5; F
1983	East Maegashira #1; 5–10 ★	West Maegashira #5; 7–8	East Maegashira #6; 6–9	East Maegashira #9; 7–8	East Maegashira #11; 7–8	East Maegashira #12; 6–9
1984	West Jūryō #1; 10–5	West Maegashira #11; 7–8	West Maegashira #12; 5–10	West Jūryō #2; 8–7	East Jūryō #1; 5–10	East Jūryō #9; 11–4–PP
1985	West Jūryō #3; 5–10	East Jūryō #7; 10–5	West Jūryō #2; 9–6	East Jūryō #1; 4–11	West Jūryō #10; 7–8	West Jūryō #12; 8–7
1986	East Jūryō #8; 7–8	East Jūryō #10; 8–7	East Jūryō #9; 7–8	East Jūryō #11; 7–8	West Jūryō #12; 9–6	East Jūryō #8; 7–8
1987	West Jūryō #10; 6–9	West Jūryō #13; 6–9	East Makushita #3; 5–2	West Jūryō #12; 10–5	West Jūryō #6; 4–11	West Jūryō #13; 7–8
1988	West Makushita #1; Retired; 2–5	x	x	x	x	x
Record given as wins–losses–absences Top division champion Top division runner-up Retired Lower divisions Non-participation Sanshō key: F=Fighting spirit; O=Outstanding performance; T=Technique Also shown: ★=Kinboshi; P=Playoff(s); Divisions: Makuuchi — Jūryō — Makushita — Sandanme — Jonidan — Jonokuchi Makuuchi ranks: Yokozuna — Ōzeki — Sekiwake — Komusubi — Maegashira

== See also ==
- List of sumo record holders
- List of sumo tournament second division champions
- Glossary of sumo terms
- List of past sumo wrestlers
- List of komusubi
