= Ireji Station =

Railway station in Ibaraki Prefecture, Japan

Ireji Station 入地駅
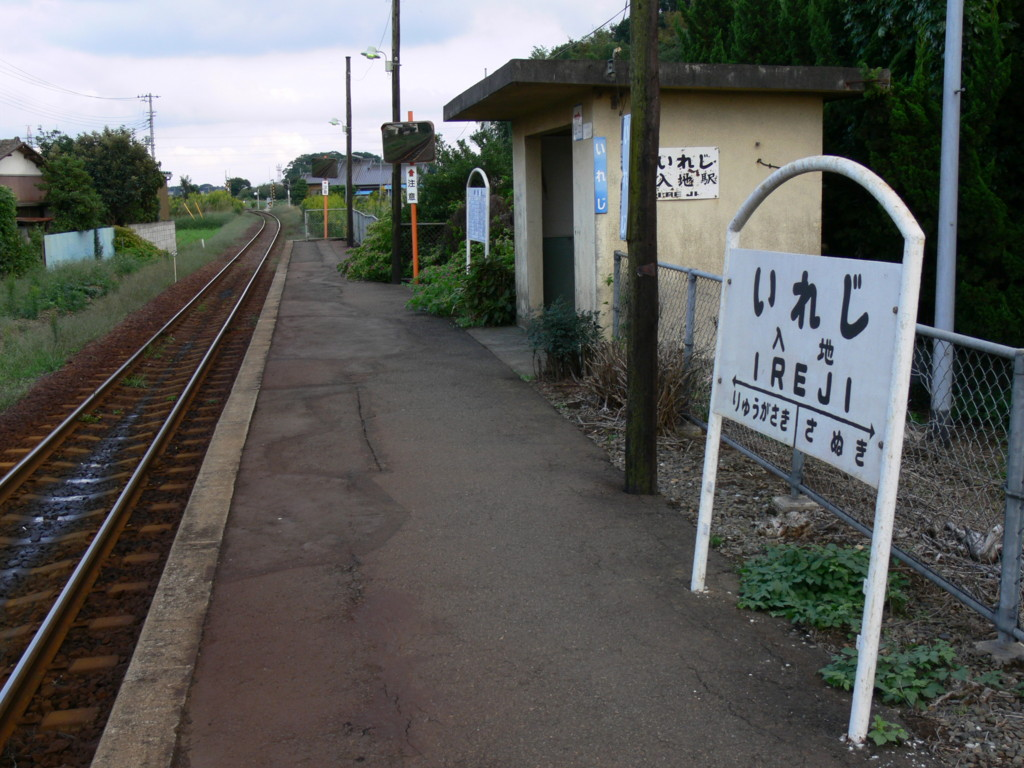
- Ireji Station, October 2005

General information
- Location: Irechimachi 351, Ryūgasaki-shi, Ibaraki-ken 301-0046; Japan
- Coordinates: 35.9190°N 140.1571°E
- Operator: Kantō Railway
- Line: ■ Ryūgasaki Line
- Distance: 2.2 km (1.4 mi) from Sanuki
- Platforms: 1 side platform

Other information
- Status: Unstaffed
- Website: Official website

History
- Opened: 1 January 1901

Passengers
- FY2017: 66 daily

Services
Preceding station	Kantō Railway	Following station
Sanuki Terminus	Ryūgasaki Line	Ryūgasaki Terminus
Location
- Location within Ibaraki Prefecture Location within Japan

Ireji Station (入地駅, Ireji-eki) is a passenger railway station in the city of Ryūgasaki, Ibaraki Prefecture, Japan operated by the private railway operator Kantō Railway.

== Lines ==
Ireji Station is a station on the Ryūgasaki Line, and is located 2.2 km (1.4 mi) from the official starting point of the line at Sanuki Station.

== Station layout ==
The station consists of a single side platform, serving traffic in both directions. There is no station building, and the station is unattended.

== History ==
Ireji Station was opened on 1 January 1901 as a station on the Ryūgasaki Railroad. The line was merged with the Kanshima Sangu Railway in 1944, which in turn became the Kantō Railway in 1965.

== Passenger statistics ==
In fiscal 2017, the station was used by an average of 66 passengers daily (boarding passengers only).

== Surrounding area ==
Ireji Station is located in a rural area of the city Ryūgasaki, with few structures in the nearby vicinity.

== See also ==
- List of railway stations in Japan
