= Kitazakura Hidetoshi =

Japanese sumo wrestler

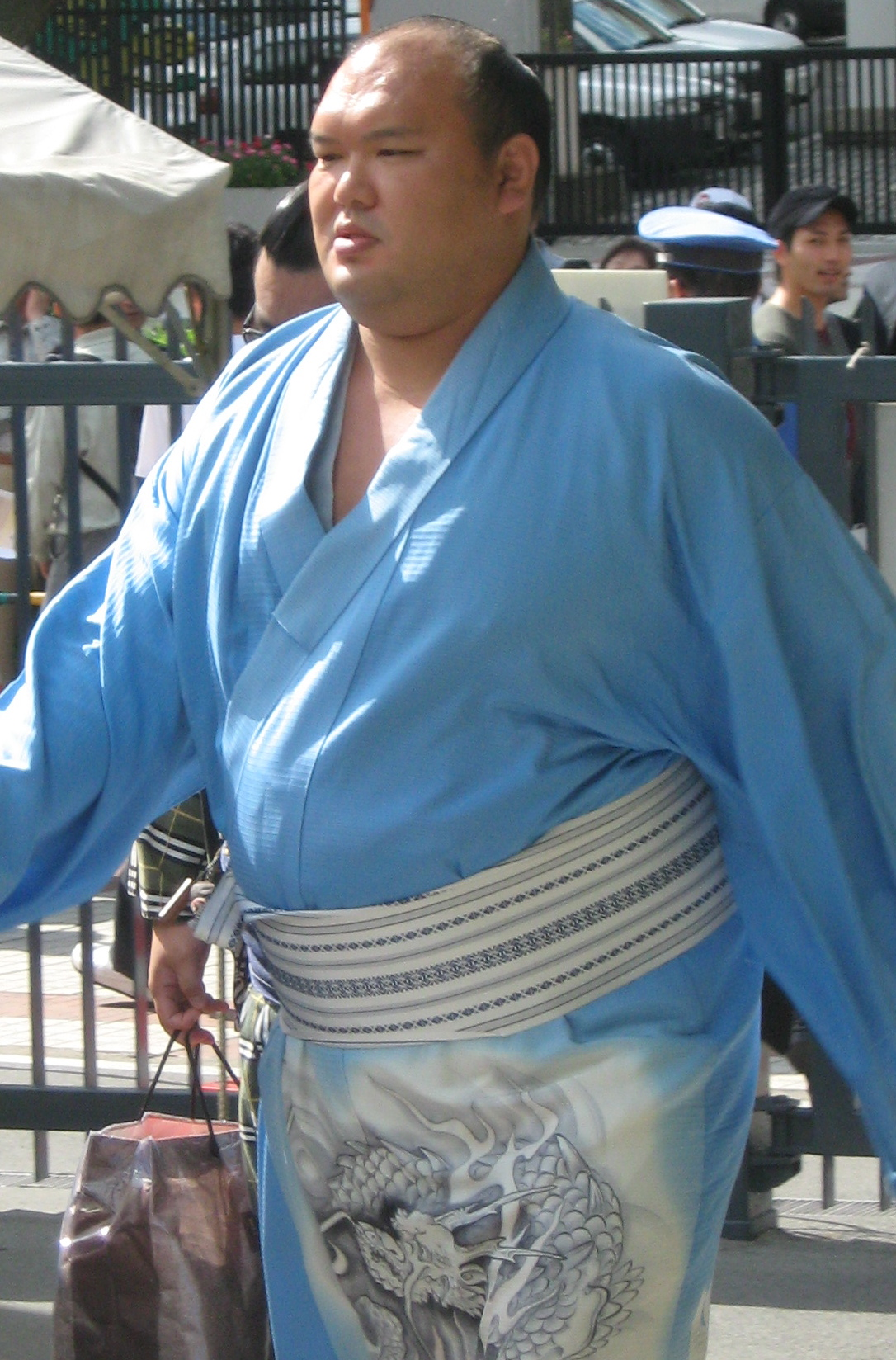

Personal information
- Native name: 北桜 英敏
- Born: Hidetoshi Mukō; December 15, 1971 (age 54) Hiroshima, Japan
- Height: 1.90 m (6 ft 3 in)
- Weight: 168 kg (370 lb)
- Website: http://blogs.yahoo.co.jp/meiko1fight555/

Sport
- Sport: Sumo
- Retired: March, 2010
- Heya: Kitanoumi
- Record: 713-711-15
- Debut: March, 1987
- Highest rank: Maegashira 9 (July, 2001)
- Elder name: Shikihide
- Championships: 1 (Jūryō); 1 (Makushita)
- Updated on Mar 2010

Kitazakura Hidetoshi (北桜 英敏), born December 15, 1971 as Hidetoshi Mukō (向 英俊, Mukō Hidetoshi), is a former sumo wrestler from Asakita ward, Hiroshima City, Japan. His highest rank was maegashira 9. He is the elder brother of Toyozakura, also a top division wrestler. He was a popular figure with sumo fans. He is now a stable master and elder of the Japan Sumo Association under the name Shikihide-oyakata.

== Career ==
Kitazakura made his professional debut in March 1987, joining Kitanoumi stable. His brother Toyozakura became a sumo wrestler two years later. Unusually for brothers in sumo, they joined different stables, Toyozakura being recruited by Tatsutagawa stable. This was the wish of their father, a former sumo wrestler himself who reached the fourth highest sandanme division. Kitazakura and Toyozakura never met in competition, as brothers are not matched against each other.

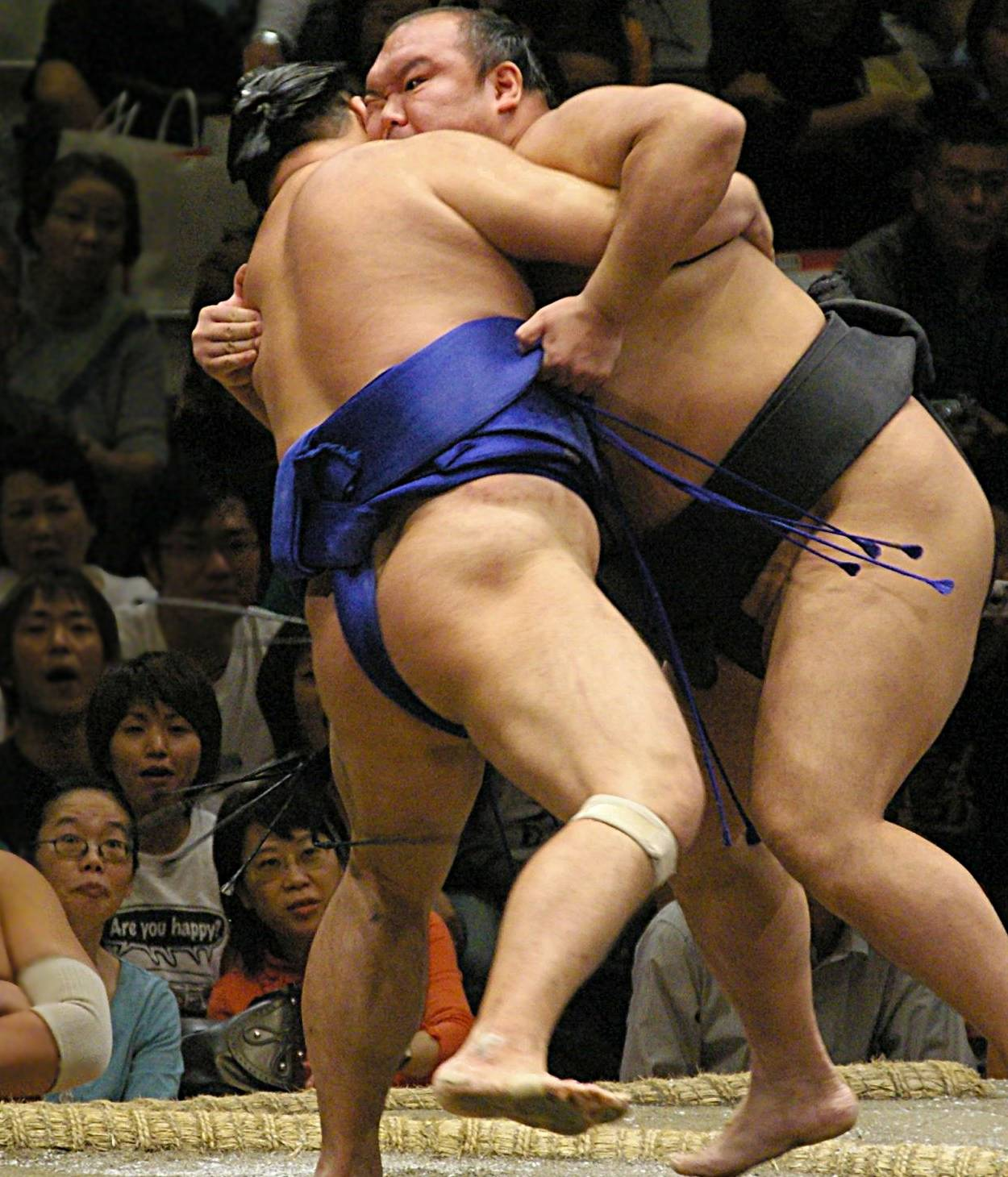
Kitazakura, right, in 2007

Initially wrestling using his real name, Kitazakura first adopted his shikona in November 1987. It took a long time to get to the salaried sekitori ranks and he spent seven years from 1991 to 1998 in the third highest makushita division. He got as high as makushita 5 in September 1995 and a good performance might have got him promotion to the second jūryō division but he fell short with a 2–5 record. Reverting to his own surname failed to change his fortunes and he fell right to the bottom of the makushita division. However, after changing back to the name Kitazakura he took the makushita championship with a perfect 7-0 record in September 1997 and three more winning records finally earned him promotion to jūryō in July 1998, after a total of eleven years in the lower divisions.

Kitazakura did not reach the top makuuchi division until July 2001 when he was in his thirtieth year, after winning the jūryō championship in May 2001. The 86 tournaments it took him to get there was the fourth slowest ever at the time (now the eighth slowest as of 2016). He never managed to become a makuuchi regular, spending 48 of his 60 sekitori tournaments in jūryō, but he was very popular with the tournament crowds, due to his adoption of Mitoizumi's trademark salt throwing routine in the pre-bout rituals. He was also renowned for his sheer eagerness to fight, forever imploring his opponent to start battle before the allotted time was up.

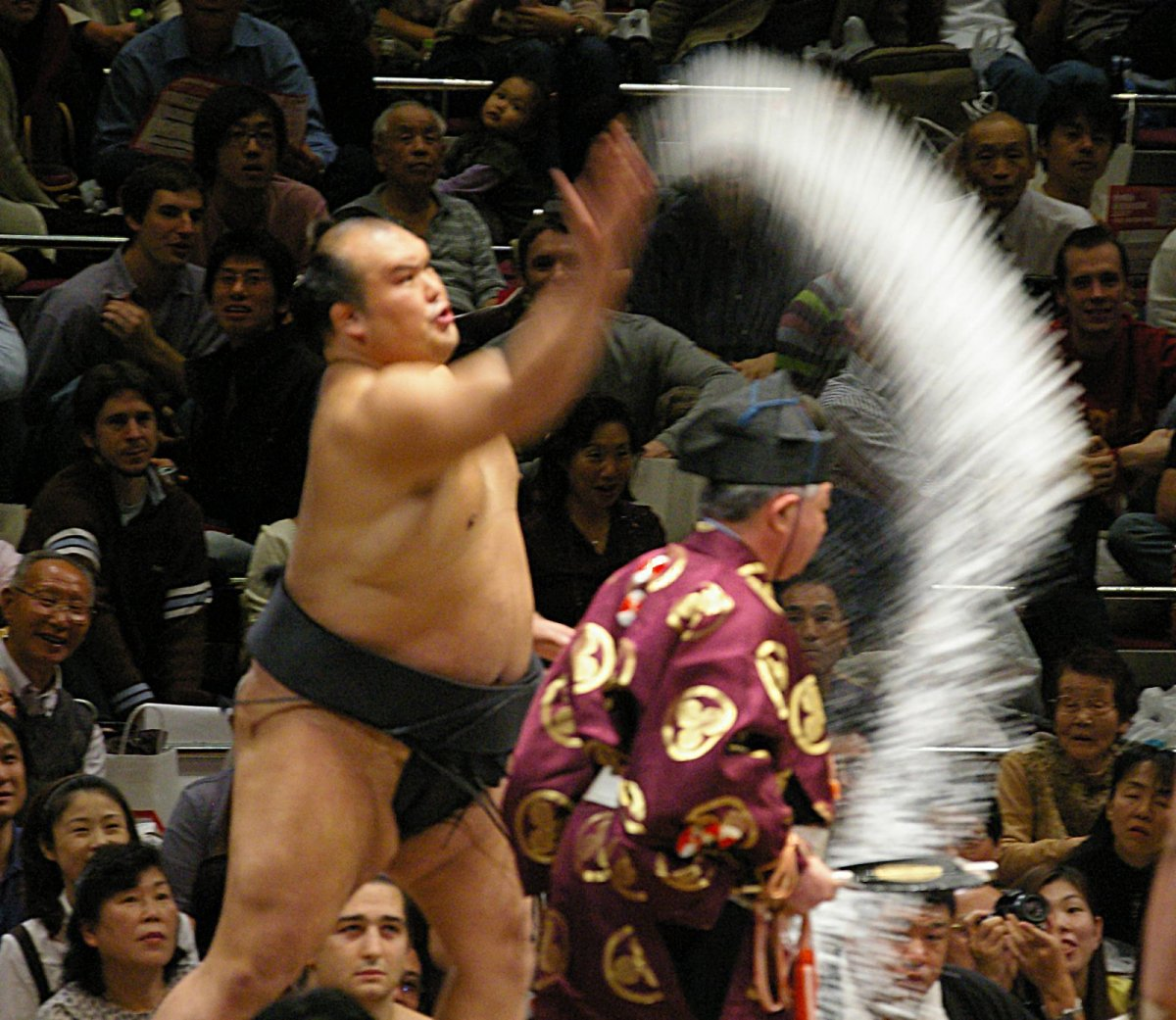
Kitazakura's salt throw

After a 5–10 result at jūryō 11 in January 2009 he was demoted to the unsalaried makushita division for the first time since 2003. Kitazakura did not retire as some expected and compiled a 4–3 record at makushita in March 2009, including one win against a jūryō 13 Wakatenro). This however was not quite enough to send him back to sekitori status for the Natsu basho, the three available places going to Sagatsukasa, Jūmonji and Tamaasuka. He produced another 4-3 score in May and this time he was promoted back to jūryō. He is the second oldest wrestler in the modern era after Ōshio to earn promotion back to the jūryō division. However, he could score only 3-12 in the July 2009 tournament and returned to makushita.

== Retirement from sumo ==
Kitazakura announced his retirement from active competition in March 2010, bringing an end to a 23-year career. His announcement came on the same day that Sendagawa-oyakata (the former ōzeki Maenoyama) reached the mandatory retirement age of 65. This allowed Onogawa-oyakata (former maegashira Yotsukasa) to switch to the Sendagawa elder name, leaving the Onogawa name free for Kitazakura. He remained at his old stable as a coach, until December 2012 when he took over the Shikihide stable in anticipation of Shikihide-oyakata, former komusubi Ōshio reaching the mandatory retirement age. The stable is unusual in that it accepts recruits who do not show much promise and may not have the physical attributes normally considered essential to success in sumo. His best known wrestler, Shōnanzakura of the lowest jonokuchi division, retired in 2021 with a career record of only three wins in 238 matches.

== Fighting style ==
Kitazakura was a yotsu-sumo wrestler, his favourite grip on his opponent's mawashi while grappling being migi-yotsu, or left hand outside, right hand inside his opponent's arms. His most common winning kimarite by far was a straightforward yori-kiri or force out, which determined the outcome of over half his victories at sekitori level.

== Personal life ==
Kitazakura is married, with one daughter. He was ill for much of 2020, and his wife in her role as okamisan took an increasing role in running and even training at Shikihide stable. Half the stable's wrestlers ran away in early August 2020, complaining about her strict behaviour and invasions of their privacy. They were persuaded to return, and with the Sumo Association's compliance committee continuing to investigate and interview the wrestlers involved, Shikihide-oyakata has promised to instruct the wrestlers better in the future.

He is known for his beadwork and his art has been displayed at the Ryōgoku Kokugikan.

== Career record ==
Kitazakura Hidetoshi
Year	January Hatsu basho, Tokyo	March Haru basho, Osaka	May Natsu basho, Tokyo	July Nagoya basho, Nagoya	September Aki basho, Tokyo	November Kyūshū basho, Fukuoka
1987	x	(Maezumo)	West Jonokuchi #2; 4–3	West Jonidan #124; 5–2	West Jonidan #84; 2–5	West Jonidan #110; 4–3
1988	East Jonidan #85; 4–3	West Jonidan #49; 4–3	East Jonidan #25; 3–4	West Jonidan #41; 6–1	East Sandanme #81; 1–6	East Jonidan #16; 3–4
1989	East Jonidan #31; 5–2	East Sandanme #93; 3–4	East Jonidan #41; 5–2	West Sandanme #76; 2–5	West Jonidan #3; 3–4	West Jonidan #20; 5–2
1990	West Sandanme #72; 6–1	West Sandanme #22; 3–4	West Sandanme #40; 3–4	East Sandanme #59; 4–3	East Sandanme #39; 5–2	East Sandanme #8; 5–2
1991	East Makushita #47; 5–2	East Makushita #30; 1–6	West Makushita #60; 3–4	West Sandanme #11; 4–3	East Makushita #56; 2–5	East Sandanme #19; 4–3
1992	East Sandanme #8; 6–1	East Makushita #37; 3–4	West Makushita #51; 3–4	West Sandanme #1; 4–3	West Makushita #46; 5–2	West Makushita #28; 4–3
1993	West Makushita #22; 5–2	East Makushita #14; 3–4	East Makushita #22; 3–4	West Makushita #28; 4–3	West Makushita #23; 3–4	East Makushita #33; 5–2
1994	East Makushita #21; 4–3	West Makushita #14; 2–5	West Makushita #29; 1–6	West Makushita #60; 5–2	East Makushita #36; 5–2	East Makushita #24; 4–3
1995	West Makushita #17; 4–3	East Makushita #11; 2–5	West Makushita #27; 6–1	East Makushita #11; 5–2	East Makushita #5; 2–5	East Makushita #17; 4–3
1996	East Makushita #12; 4–3	West Makushita #7; 3–4	East Makushita #15; 2–5	West Makushita #31; 2–5	East Makushita #50; 5–2	West Makushita #31; 5–2
1997	East Makushita #18; 3–4	West Makushita #25; 3–4	West Makushita #33; 5–2	East Makushita #20; 2–5	West Makushita #44; 2–5	West Makushita #60; 7–0; Champion
1998	West Makushita #7; 5–2	East Makushita #3; 4–3	West Makushita #2; 6–1	West Jūryō #12; Sat out due to injury 0–0–15	West Jūryō #12; 9–6	East Jūryō #10; 6–9
1999	East Makushita #1; 4–3	East Jūryō #13; 7–8	East Makushita #1; 5–2	East Jūryō #12; 7–8	East Jūryō #13; 8–7	East Jūryō #11; 7–8
2000	West Jūryō #12; 7–8	West Jūryō #13; 6–9	West Makushita #2; 5–2	East Jūryō #11; 7–8	East Jūryō #12; 6–9	West Makushita #2; 4–3
2001	West Jūryō #13; 10–5	West Jūryō #4; 9–6	West Jūryō #1; 13–2; Champion	West Maegashira #9; 6–9	East Maegashira #13; 8–7	West Maegashira #11; 5–10
2002	East Jūryō #1; 6–9	East Jūryō #4; 7–8	West Jūryō #5; 9–6	East Jūryō #2; 6–9	East Jūryō #7; 7–8	West Jūryō #8; 5–10
2003	East Jūryō #13; 8–7	East Jūryō #10; 5–10	East Makushita #1; 5–2	East Jūryō #11; 8–7	East Jūryō #8; 9–6	East Jūryō #5; 10–5
2004	East Maegashira #15; 3–12	East Jūryō #6; 8–7	West Jūryō #5; 5–10	West Jūryō #8; 11–4	East Maegashira #17; 6–9	East Jūryō #3; 8–7
2005	West Jūryō #2; 8–7	East Jūryō #1; 5–10	West Jūryō #5; 8–7	West Jūryō #4; 7–8	East Jūryō #6; 9–6	West Jūryō #2; 8–7
2006	East Maegashira #17; 9–6	West Maegashira #14; 7–8	West Maegashira #15; 7–8	East Maegashira #16; 5–10	West Jūryō #4; 10–5	West Maegashira #11; 4–11
2007	West Jūryō #1; 6–9	West Jūryō #5; 9–6	East Jūryō #2; 9–6	West Maegashira #11; 6–9	East Maegashira #14; 4–11	West Jūryō #4; 6–9
2008	East Jūryō #8; 10–5	West Jūryō #4; 6–9	West Jūryō #8; 10–5	East Jūryō #3; 8–7	West Jūryō #1; 2–13	East Jūryō #10; 7–8
2009	West Jūryō #11; 5–10	West Makushita #2; 4–3	West Makushita #1; 4–3	West Jūryō #13; 3–12	West Makushita #7; 4–3	East Makushita #6; 2–5
2010	East Makushita #16; 2–5	East Makushita #27; Retired –	x	x	x	x
Record given as wins–losses–absences Top division champion Top division runner-up Retired Lower divisions Non-participation Sanshō key: F=Fighting spirit; O=Outstanding performance; T=Technique Also shown: ★=Kinboshi; P=Playoff(s); Divisions: Makuuchi — Jūryō — Makushita — Sandanme — Jonidan — Jonokuchi Makuuchi ranks: Yokozuna — Ōzeki — Sekiwake — Komusubi — Maegashira

== See also ==
- Glossary of sumo terms
- List of sumo tournament second division champions
- List of past sumo wrestlers
- List of sumo elders
