= Hitachino-Ushiku Station =

Railway station in Ushiku, Ibaraki Prefecture, Japan

Hitachino-Ushiku Station ひたち野うしく駅
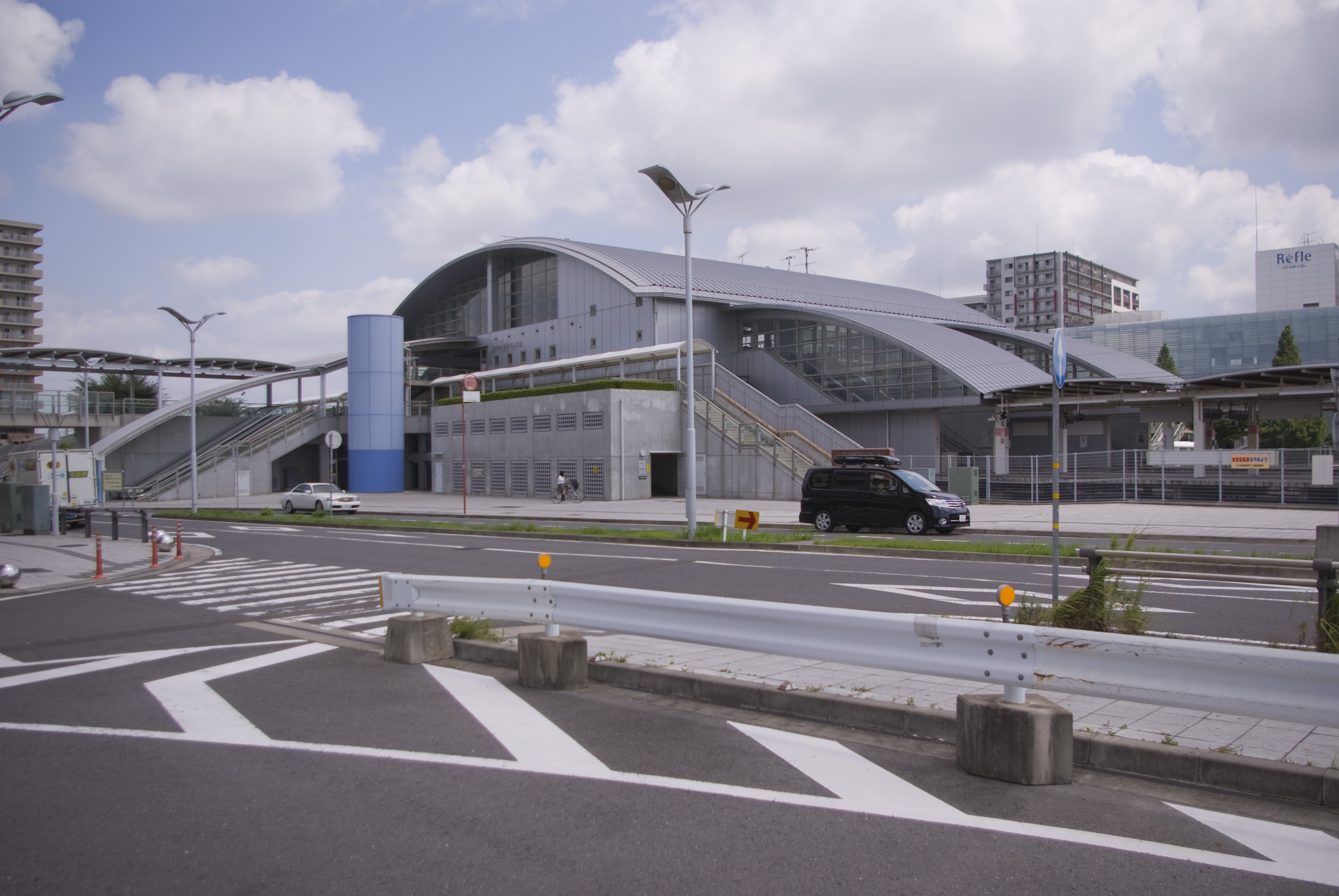
- Hitachino-Ushiku Station, August 2009

General information
- Location: Hitachino-Nishi 3-41-16, Ushiku-shi, Ibaraki-ken 300-1206; Japan
- Coordinates: 36.0078°N 140.1586°E
- Operator: JR East
- Line: ■ Jōban Line
- Distance: 54.5 km from Nippori
- Platforms: 2 island platforms

Other information
- Status: Staffed (Midori no Madoguchi )
- Website: Official website

History
- Opened: 14 March 1998

Passengers
- FY2019: 6952 daily

Services
Preceding station	JR East	Following station
Ushiku towards Shinagawa	Tokiwa (limited service)	Arakawaoki (limited service) towards Takahagi
Ushiku towards Shinagawa	Jōban Line Special Rapid	Arakawaoki towards Tsuchiura
Ushiku towards Shinagawa	Jōban Line Local-Futsuu	Arakawaoki towards Sendai
Location
- Location within Ibaraki Prefecture Location within Japan

Hitachino-Ushiku Station (ひたち野うしく駅, Hitachino-Ushiku-eki) is a passenger railway station located in the city of Ushiku, Ibaraki Prefecture, Japan operated by the East Japan Railway Company (JR East).

== Lines ==
Hitachino-Ushiku Station is served by the Jōban Line, and is located 54.5 km from the official starting point of the line at Nippori Station.

== Station layout ==
The station consists of two island platforms connected to the station building by a footbridge. The station has a Midori no Madoguchi staffed ticket office.

=== Platforms ===
1	■ Jōban Line ( Ueno-Tokyo Line)	for Toride, Kashiwa, Ueno, Tokyo and Shinagawa
2	■ Jōban Line ( Ueno-Tokyo Line)	for Toride, Kashiwa, Ueno, Tokyo and Shinagawa
2	■ Jōban Line (Tokiwa Limited Express)	for Ueno, Tokyo and Shinagawa
3	■ Jōban Line (Tokiwa Limited Express)	for Tsuchiura, Ishioka, Mito, Takahagi
3	■ Jōban Line	for Tsuchiura, Ishioka, Mito, Takahagi and Iwaki
4	■ Jōban Line	for Tsuchiura, Ishioka, Mito, Takahagi and Iwaki

== History ==
Hitachino-Ushiku Station opened on 14 March 1998 on the site of the Banpaku-Chuo Station (万博中央駅), a temporary station which had been erected for Expo '85.

== Passenger statistics ==
In fiscal 2019, the station was used by an average of 6952 passengers daily (boarding passengers only).

== Surrounding area ==
- National Route 6

== See also ==
- List of railway stations in Japan
