= Fujishiro Station =

Railway station in Toride, Ibaraki Prefecture, Japan

Fujishiro Station 藤代駅
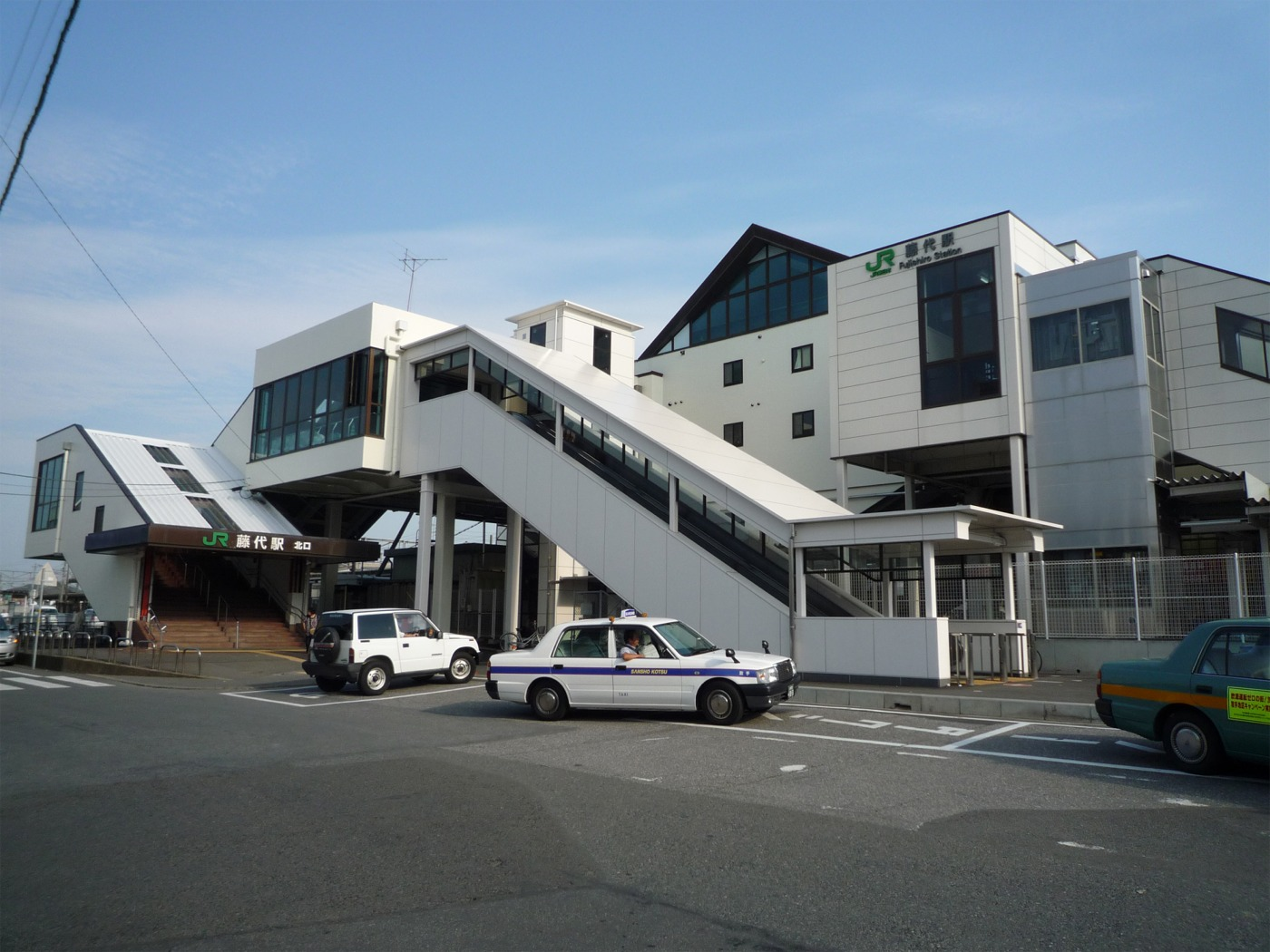
- Fujishiro Station, September 2008

General information
- Location: Miyawada 1131, Toride-shi, Ibaraki-ken 300-1514; Japan
- Coordinates: 35.9212°N 140.1185°E
- Operator: JR East
- Line: ■ Jōban Line
- Distance: 43.4 km from Nippori
- Platforms: 2 side platforms

Other information
- Status: Staffed
- Website: Official website

History
- Opened: 25 December 1896

Passengers
- FY2019: 6123 daily

Services
Preceding station	JR East	Following station
Toride JJ10 towards Shinagawa	Jōban Line Special Rapid	Ryūgasakishi towards Tsuchiura
Toride JJ10 towards Shinagawa	Jōban Line Local-Futsuu	Ryūgasakishi towards Sendai
Location
- Location within Ibaraki Prefecture Location within Japan

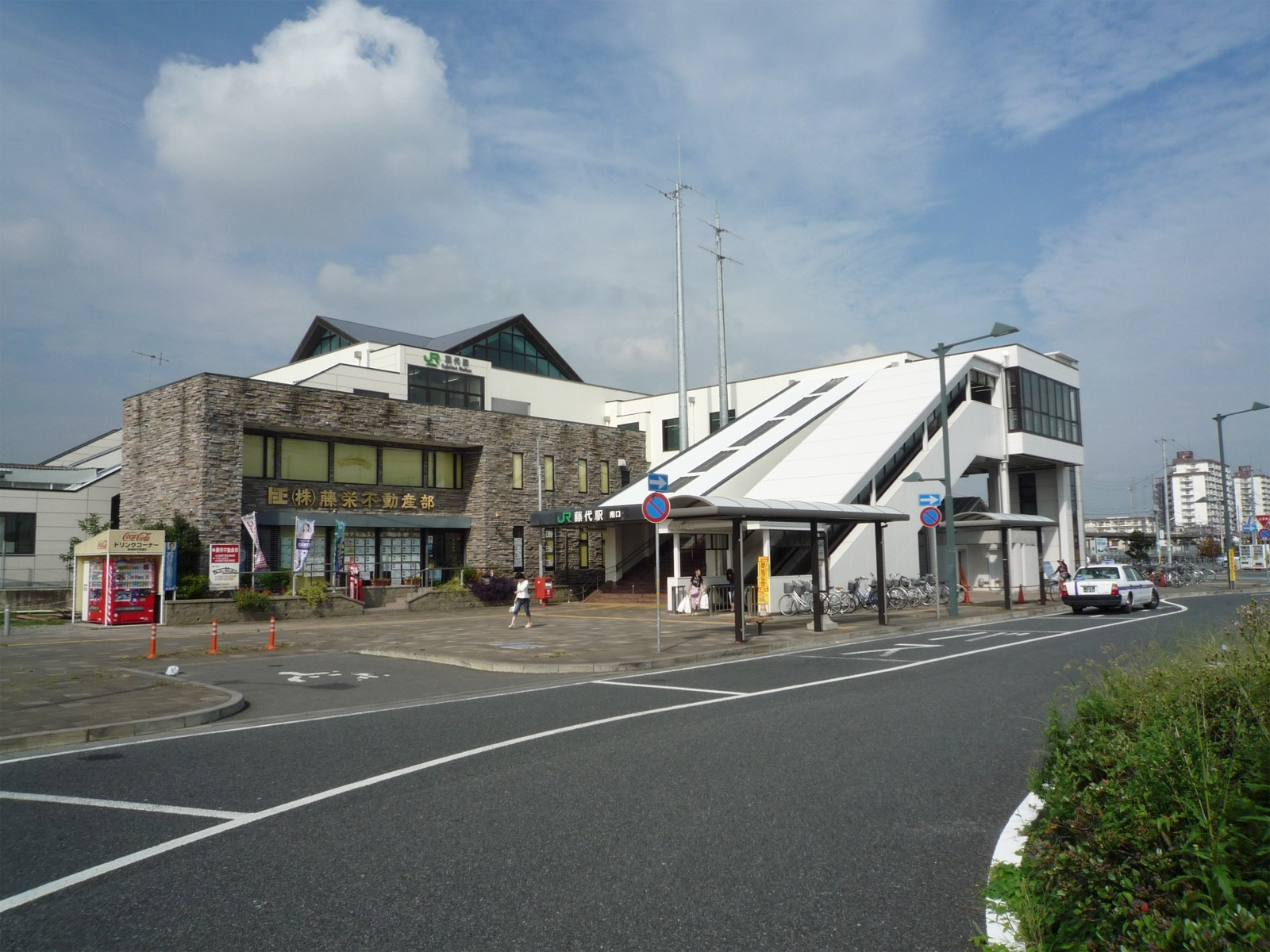
South exit, September 2008

Fujishiro Station (藤代駅, Fujishiro-eki) is a passenger railway station located in the city of Toride, Ibaraki Prefecture, Japan operated by the East Japan Railway Company (JR East).

== Lines ==
Fujishiro Station is served by the Jōban Line, and is located 43.4 km from the official starting point of the line at Nippori Station.

== Station layout ==
The station consists two opposed side platforms, connected to the elevated station building by a footbridge. The station is staffed.

=== Platforms ===
1	■ Jōban Line	for Tsuchiura, Ishioka, Mito, Takahagi and Iwaki
2	■ Jōban Line ( Ueno-Tokyo Line)	for Toride, Kashiwa, Matsudo, Ueno, Tokyo and Shinagawa

== History ==
Fujishiro Station was opened on 25 December 1896. The current station building was completed in March 1987. The station was absorbed into the JR East network upon the privatization of the Japanese National Railways (JNR) on 1 April 1987.

== Passenger statistics ==
In fiscal 2019, the station was used by an average of 6132 passengers daily (boarding passengers only).

== Surrounding area ==
- Fujishiro Post Office
- National Route 6

== See also ==
- List of railway stations in Japan
