= Ryūgasaki Station =

Railway station in Ibaraki Prefecture, Japan

Ryūgasaki Station 竜ヶ崎駅
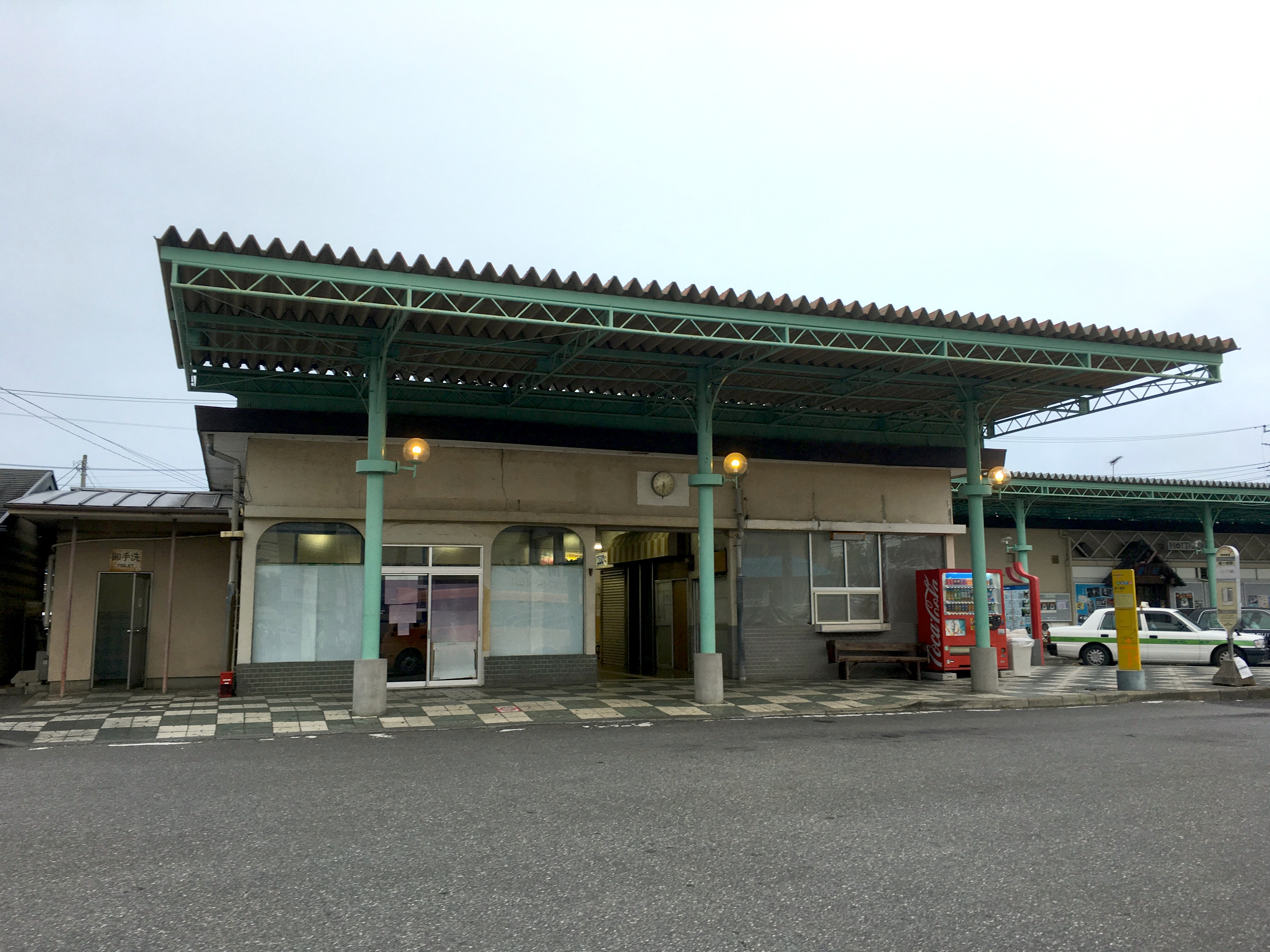
- Ryūgasaki Station, 2016

General information
- Location: Komemachi 3903-1, Ryūgasaki-shi, Ibaraki-ken 301-0004; Japan
- Coordinates: 35°54′31″N 140°10′45″E
- Operator: Kantō Railway
- Line: ■ Ryūgasaki Line
- Distance: 4.5 km from Sanuki
- Platforms: 1 side platform

Other information
- Status: Staffed

History
- Opened: 14 August 1900

Passengers
- FY2017: 2316 daily

Services
Preceding station	Kantō Railway	Following station
Ireji towards Sanuki	Ryūgasaki Line	Terminus
Location
- Location within Ibaraki Prefecture Location within Japan

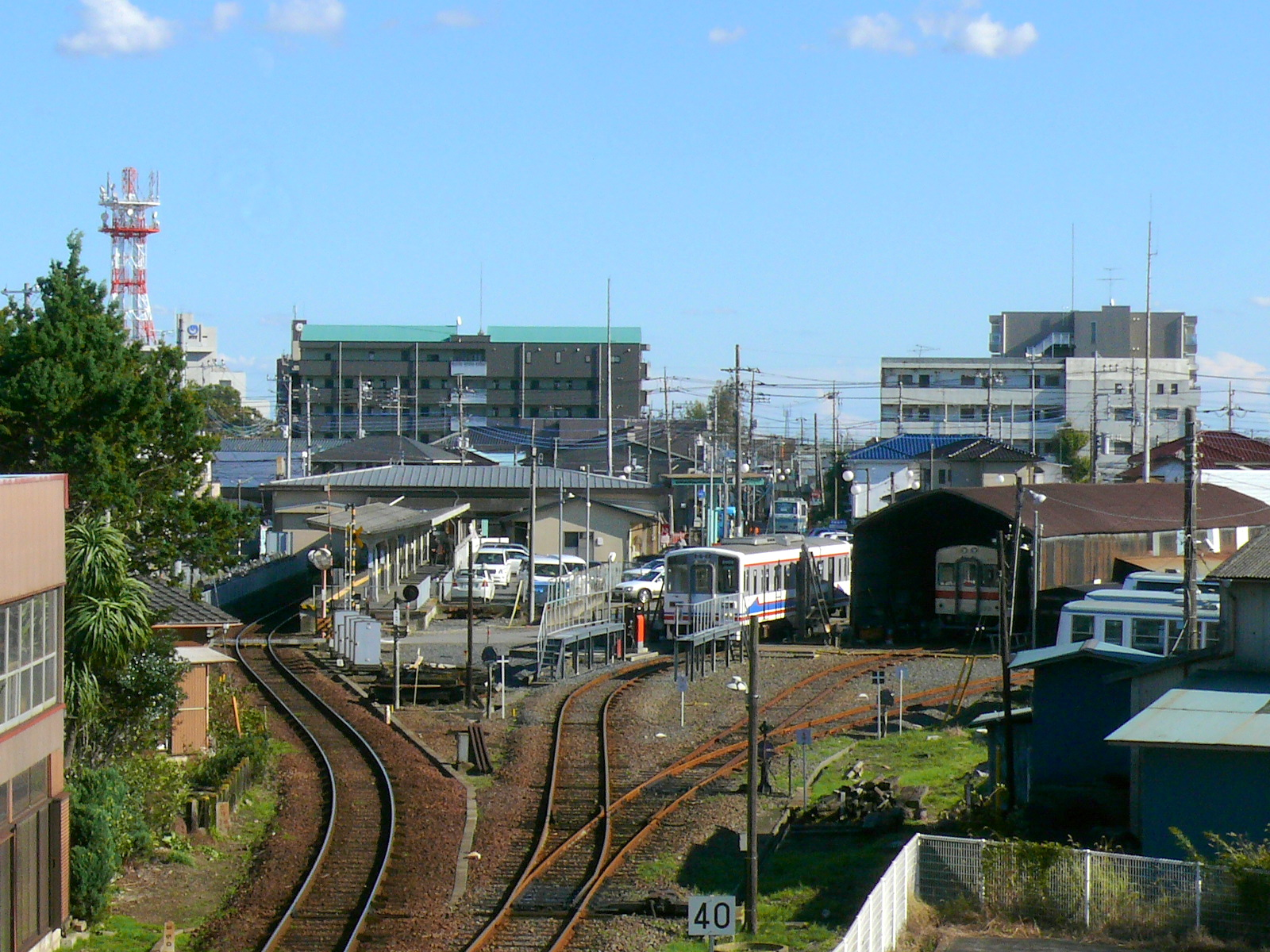
Ryūgasaki Station train tracks, 2009

Ryūgasaki Station (竜ヶ崎駅, Ryūgasaki-eki) is a passenger railway station in the city of Ryūgasaki, Ibaraki Prefecture, Japan operated by the private railway operator Kantō Railway.

== Lines ==
Ryūgasaki Station is a terminus of the Ryūgasaki Line, and is located 4.5 km from the opposing terminus of the line at Sanuki Station.

== Station layout ==
The station consists of a single dead-headed side platform, with a rail yard to one side. The station was originally built with a bay platform, but the station was rebuilt after freight operations were discontinued in 1971, and the original platform and station building was replaced.

== History ==
Ryūgasaki Station was opened on 14 August 1900 as Ryūgasaki Station (龍ケ崎駅) on the Ryūgasaki Railroad. The line was merged with the Kashima Sangu Railway in 1944, which in turn became the Kanto Railway in 1965. The kanji of its name was changed to the present form in 1954.

== Passenger statistics ==
In fiscal 2017, the station was used by an average of 2316 passengers daily (boarding passengers only).

== Surrounding area ==
- Ryūgasaki City Hall
- Ryūgasaki Post Office
- Ryutsu Keizai University

== See also ==
- List of railway stations in Japan
