= Arakawaoki Station =

Railway station in Tsuchiura, Ibaraki Prefecture, Japan

Arakawaoki Station 荒川沖駅
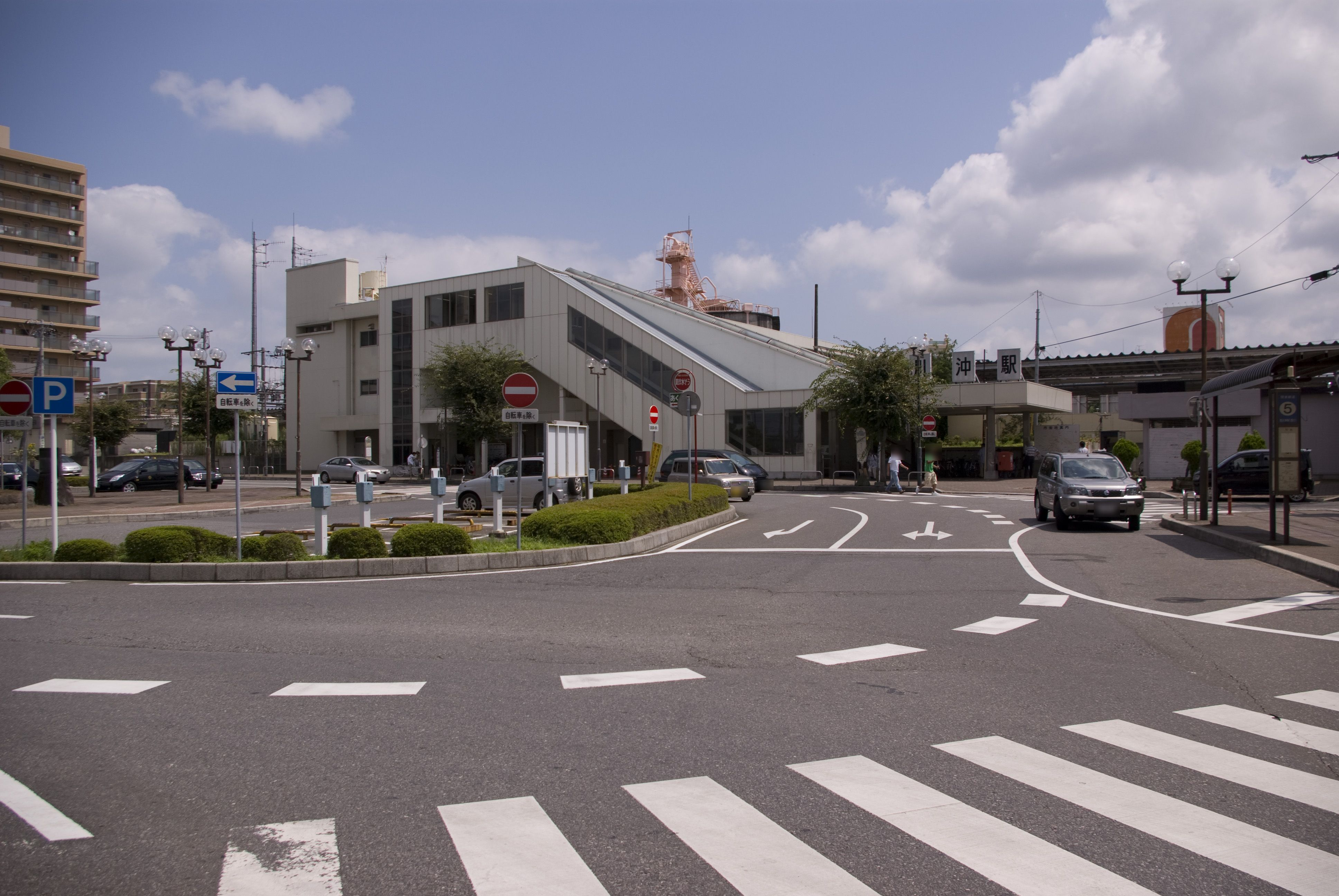
- Arakawaoki Station, August 2008

General information
- Location: Arakawaoki Higashi 2-1-6, Tsuchiura, Ibaraki-ken 300-0871; Japan
- Coordinates: 36.0305°N 140.1659°E
- Operator: JR East
- Line: ■ Jōban Line
- Distance: 57.2 km from Nippori
- Platforms: 2 side platforms

Other information
- Status: Staffed (Midori no Madoguchi )
- Website: Official website

History
- Opened: 25 December 1896

Passengers
- FY2019: 8158 daily

Services
Preceding station	JR East	Following station
Hitachino-Ushiku (limited service) towards Shinagawa	Tokiwa (limited service)	Tsuchiura towards Takahagi
Hitachino-Ushiku towards Shinagawa	Jōban Line Special Rapid	Tsuchiura Terminus
Hitachino-Ushiku towards Shinagawa	Jōban Line Local-Futsuu	Tsuchiura towards Sendai
Location
- Location within Ibaraki Prefecture Location within Japan

Arakawaoki Station (荒川沖駅, Arakawaoki-eki) is a passenger railway station located in the city of Tsuchiura, Ibaraki Prefecture, Japan operated by the East Japan Railway Company (JR East).

== Lines ==
Arakawaoki Station is served by the Jōban Line, and is located 57.2 km from the official starting point of the line at Nippori Station.

== Station layout ==
The station is an elevated station with two opposed side platforms. It has a Midori no Madoguchi staffed ticket office.

=== Platforms ===
1	■ Jōban Line	for Tsuchiura, Ishioka, Mito, Takahagi and Iwaki
2	■ Jōban Line ( Ueno-Tokyo Line)	for Toride, Kashiwa, Ueno, Tokyo and Shinagawa

== History ==
Arakawaoki Station opened on 25 December 1896. The station was absorbed into the JR East network upon the privatization of the Japanese National Railways (JNR) on 1 April 1987. On 23 March 2008, one person was killed and seven people injured when a man (Masahiro Kanagawa, aged 24) went on a stabbing spree with two knives in the passageway linking the station to the nearby shopping street.

== Passenger statistics ==
In fiscal 2019, the station was used by an average of 8158 passengers daily (boarding passengers only).

== Surrounding area ==
The surrounding area is a residential suburb.

== See also ==
- List of railway stations in Japan

Timetable in weekday https://timetables.jreast.co.jp/en/2602/timetable/tt0080/0080010.html
