= Shōnanzakura Sōta =

Former sumo wrestler

Personal information
- Native name: 勝南桜 聡太
- Born: Shōta Hattori; 16 July 1998 (age 28) Chigasaki, Japan
- Height: 1.80 m (5 ft 11 in)
- Weight: 82 kg (181 lb)

Sport
- Sport: Sumo
- Retired: July 2021
- Heya: Shikihide
- Record: 3-238-8
- Debut: September 2015
- Highest rank: Jonokuchi #9 (May 2021)
- Updated on 29 August 2021

Shōnanzakura Sōta (Japanese: 勝南桜 聡太; born 16 July 1998 as Shōta Hattori (服部 祥多)) is a Japanese former sumo wrestler from Chigasaki, Kanagawa. He made his professional debut in September 2015 and was first known as Hattorizakura Futoshi (服部桜 太志). He retired after the July 2021 tournament at the age of 23. His highest rank was jonokuchi 9. He was notable for having an exceptionally poor record in sumo, having won only 3 of his 238 career bouts, and set an all-time record of 104 consecutive losses. At times he was criticized for appearing to make deliberate attempts to lose and thus avoid competing. He was a member of Shikihide stable, which is well known for taking on any aspiring wrestler regardless of ability.

== Early life ==
Hattori first became interested in sumo in elementary school, from watching broadcasts of the makushita division on TV. At junior high school he was a member of the track and field club, specializing in the 1500 metres. After completing his compulsory education he did not go on to high school, preferring to work on strength training and continuing his athletic activities. From this he became interested in sumo training methods. After visiting the Ryōgoku Kokugikan with his grandfather to watch sumo he met Shikihide-oyakata, the head coach of Shikihide stable and had his picture taken with him. He liked the stablemaster's personality and in December 2014 without his family's knowledge visited Shikihide stable, asking to join. The stable was well known for accepting any recruit regardless of physique or previous sumo experience, but Shikihide saw his small size and told him that he might be better suited as a sumo gyōji (referee) or tokoyama (hairdresser) and that he had to go back home to get his parents' permission first. Hattori returned to the stable in August 2015 with his mother, and was accepted as a new recruit.

== Career ==
He was given the shikona of Hattorizakura, using a combination of his own surname and zakura ("cherry blossoms") taken from his stablemaster's fighting name, Kitazakura. He made his professional debut in September 2015, weighing just 70 kg (150 lb). He began with 22 consecutive losses before recording his first career win over Sawanofuji on the sixth day of the May 2016 tournament. He then began another losing streak, and in March 2017 he took the record for most consecutive losses since the establishment of the six tournaments per year system in 1958, surpassing the 32 Morikawa had from July 2003 to March 2004. At the end of the March 2017 tournament he became the first wrestler to score 0–7 in five successive tournaments. His 70th straight loss was remarked upon as being the counterpart to Futabayama's all-time record of 69 consecutive wins. Eventually he had 89 consecutive losses before getting his second career win over Soga in July 2018. After another 23 losses he got his third and final career victory over Houn in January 2019. In March 2021 he was defeated for the 90th straight time, surpassing his previous record losing streak. The run had extended to 104 consecutive losses by July 2021, just after his 23rd birthday.

On the second day of the September 2016 tournament he attracted negative media publicity after he appeared several times to throw himself to the ground without touching his opponent, Kinjo (now Chiyodaigo). The ringside judges had to intervene and instruct him to redo the bout so that a real match could take place. Afterwards his stablemaster Shikihide said that Hattorizakura had a neck injury and feared hurting himself further. Hattorizakura considered retiring at that point but was told by Shikihide that he should not run away and be forever thought of as a quitter. Instead to draw a line under the incident he immediately changed the second part of his shikona from his own given name of Shōta to Futoshi.

Shortly before the January 2021 tournament his whole shikona changed, to Shōnanzakura Sōta. Shōnan is his native region, and the kanji for shō also meant "win." The second part of the shikona, Sōta, was a reference to the shogi player Sōta Fujii.

Shōnanzakura, due to his lack of success, spent his entire career in the lowest jonokuchi division, where it is possible to move up the division despite not getting a kachi-koshi or more wins than losses in a tournament. In May 2021 he reached his highest rank of jonokuchi 9, not because of any improvement in performance but because a large number of new recruits from the previous tournament had not been able to compete because their maezumo bouts were cancelled due to the COVID-19 pandemic, and they all had to be ranked below him as a result.

== Retirement from sumo ==
It was revealed on 25 August 2021 that Shōnanzakura had retired after the July tournament and had his danpatsu-shiki or retirement ceremony at his heya on 7 August. His stablemaster Shikihide said he had wanted his wrestler to continue but ultimately accepted his decision. He praised Shōnanzakura for remaining dedicated despite his losing streak, being first to training and being courteous when helping out with cleaning and cooking the chankonabe. He said Shōnanzakura was now back at his parents' house in Kanagawa and ready to begin his second life.

== Fighting style ==
He was restricted not only by his light weight, but his poor tachi-ai which saw him stand up straight too quickly, leading to him being overwhelmed by his opponents. He worked on getting a migi-yotsu (right hand inside, left hand outside) grip on his opponent's mawashi or belt. His stablemaster said that when he first joined Shōnanzakura could not do push-ups, but by July 2021 could handle a hundred in a session. Shikihide said his wrestler was good in training, but became too nervous when competing in tournaments.

== Records ==
Shōnanzakura holds a number of "losing" records, including:

- 104 consecutive losses
- 30 completed tournaments with no wins (26 of these 0–7, four were 0–8 when he was required to fight an extra match)
- 42 losses in a calendar year, the most for any non-sekitori
- 34 consecutive make-koshi, the most by a wrestler with no kachi-koshi and second only to Morikawa's 38 overall
- Reaching 100 career defeats with only one career win
- Reaching 200 career defeats with only three career wins

== Career record ==
Shōnanzakura Sōta
Year	January Hatsu basho, Tokyo	March Haru basho, Osaka	May Natsu basho, Tokyo	July Nagoya basho, Nagoya	September Aki basho, Tokyo	November Kyūshū basho, Fukuoka
2015	x	x	x	x	(Maezumo)	West Jonokuchi #24; 0–7
2016	West Jonokuchi #22; 0–6–1	East Jonokuchi #22; 0–7	East Jonokuchi #30; 1–6	East Jonokuchi #18; 0–7	West Jonokuchi #29; 0–7	East Jonokuchi #25; 0–7
2017	West Jonokuchi #18; 0–7	West Jonokuchi #20; 0–7	East Jonokuchi #29; 0–7	West Jonokuchi #28; 0–7	East Jonokuchi #28; 0–7	West Jonokuchi #24; 0–7
2018	West Jonokuchi #24; 0–7	West Jonokuchi #24; 0–7	East Jonokuchi #34; 0–7	East Jonokuchi #34; 1–6	East Jonokuchi #27; 0–7	West Jonokuchi #28; 0–7
2019	West Jonokuchi #26; 1–6	West Jonokuchi #15; 0–8	East Jonokuchi #33; 0–7	East Jonokuchi #33; 0–7	East Jonokuchi #34; 0–7	West Jonokuchi #29; 0–7
2020	West Jonokuchi #27; 0–7	East Jonokuchi #26; 0–8	East Jonokuchi #35; Tournament Cancelled; State of Emergency; 0–0–0	East Jonokuchi #35; 0–7	West Jonokuchi #32; 0–8	East Jonokuchi #30; 0–7
2021	East Jonokuchi #28; 0–8	East Jonokuchi #24; 0–7	East Jonokuchi #9; 0–7	West Jonokuchi #24; 0–7	West Jonokuchi #20; Retired –	x
Record given as wins–losses–absences Top division champion Top division runner-up Retired Lower divisions Non-participation Sanshō key: F=Fighting spirit; O=Outstanding performance; T=Technique Also shown: ★=Kinboshi; P=Playoff(s); Divisions: Makuuchi — Jūryō — Makushita — Sandanme — Jonidan — Jonokuchi Makuuchi ranks: Yokozuna — Ōzeki — Sekiwake — Komusubi — Maegashira

== See also ==
- Glossary of sumo terms
- List of past sumo wrestlers
