= Ryūgasaki Line =

Railway line in Ibaraki Prefecture, Japan

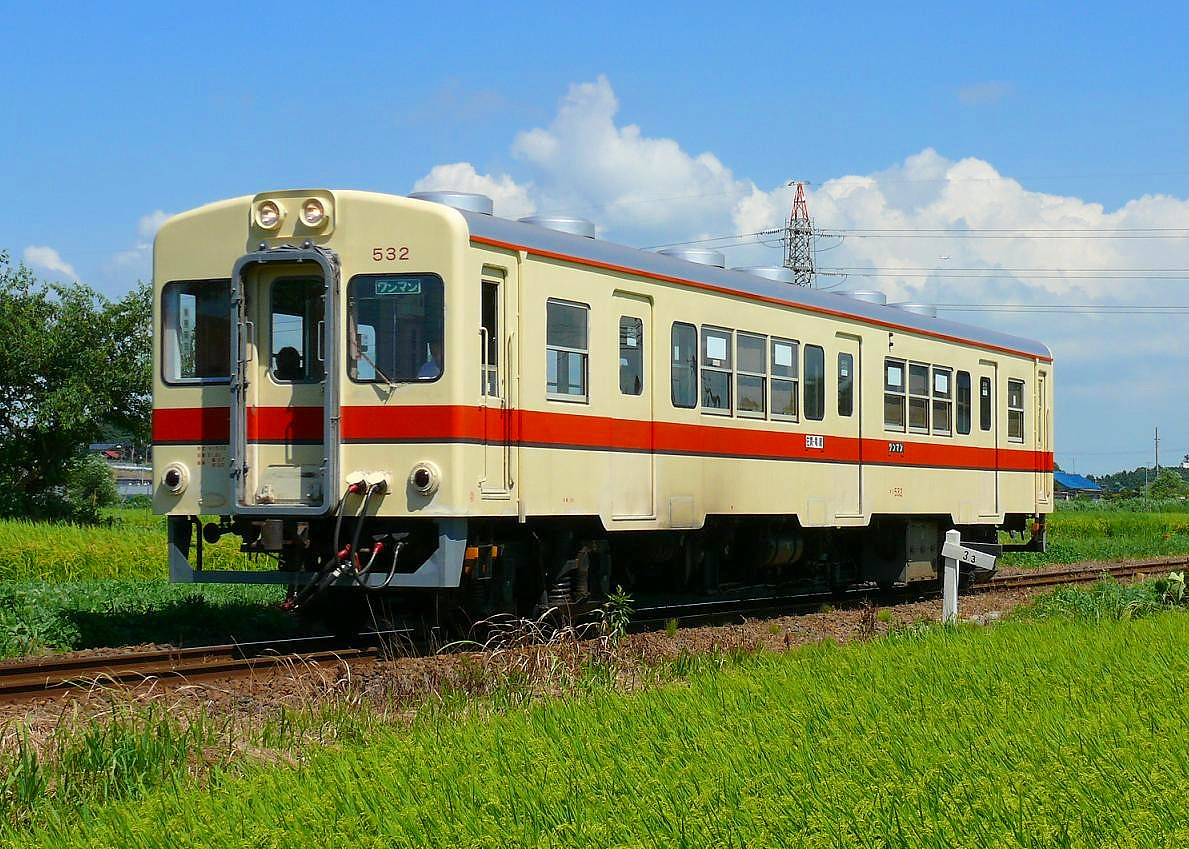
- Kanto Railway KiHa 532 DMU in August 2007

Overview
- Status: In operation
- Owner: Kantō Railway
- Locale: Ibaraki Prefecture
- Termini: Sanuki; Ryūgasaki
- Stations: 3

Service
- Type: Heavy rail
- System: Kantō Railway
- Rolling stock: KiHa 532 and 2000 series

History
- Opened: 14 August 1900; 126 years ago

Technical
- Line length: 4.5 km (2.8 mi)
- Number of tracks: 1
- Track gauge: 1,067 mm (3 ft 6 in)
- Old gauge: 762 mm (2 ft 6 in)
- Minimum radius: 207 m (679 ft)
- Operating speed: 50 km/h (31 mph)

The Ryūgasaki Line (Japanese: 竜ヶ崎線, Hepburn: Ryūgasaki-sen) is a railway line operated by the Kantō Railway in Ibaraki Prefecture in Japan. It is a non-electrified line which connects Sanuki, on the Jōban Line, to Ryūgasaki, with one intermediate station at Ireji.

== Services ==
Trains operate approximately every 20 minutes during morning & evening peak hours and every 30 minutes at other times. All services on the Line are Local trains, stopping at every station. Running time is 7 minutes.

== History ==
The Ryuzaki Railway Co. opened the line on 14 August 1900 as a 762 mm (2 ft 6 in) gauge steam-operated line. The line was regauged to 1,067 mm (3 ft 6 in) in July 1915.

The company merged with the Kashima Sangu Railway Co. in 1944, which merged with the Kanto Railway Co. in 1965.

Freight services ceased in 1971, the same year the line switched to driver-only-operation (in August 1971), becoming the first driver-only-operation line in Japan.

== Stations ==
All stations are in Ryūgasaki, Ibaraki Prefecture.

Station	Distance in km (mi)	Transfers
Sanuki 佐貫	0.0 (0)	■ Jōban Line (Ryūgasakishi)
Ireji 入地	2.2 (1.4)	
Ryūgasaki 竜ヶ崎	4.5 (2.8)	
