= Ryūgasakishi Station =

Railway station in Ibaraki Prefecture, Japan

Ryūgasakishi Station Sanuki Station 龍ケ崎市駅 佐貫駅
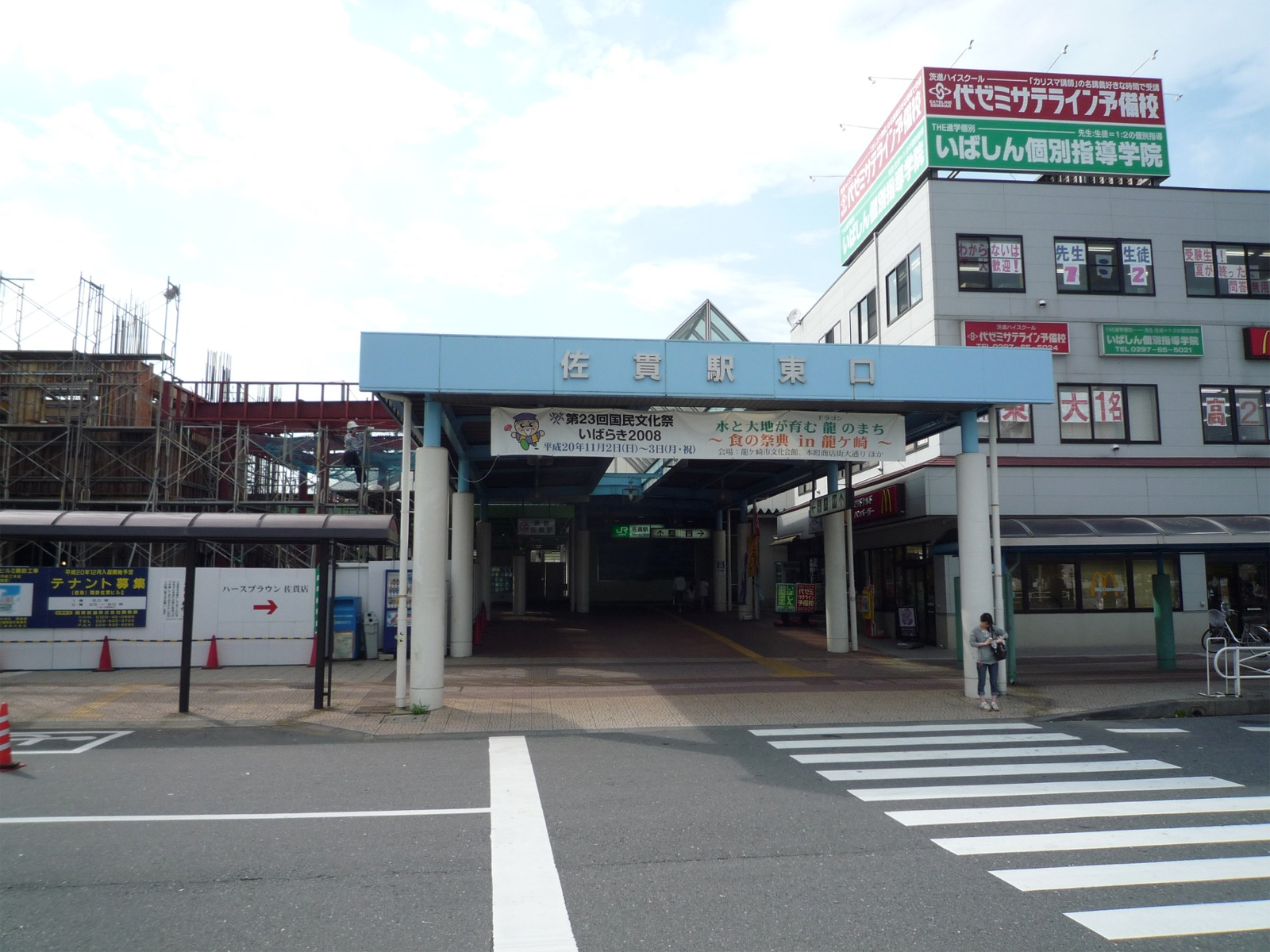
- Sanuki Station east entrance in September 2008

General information
- Location: Sanukimachi, Ryūgasaki-shi, Ibaraki-ken 301-0033; Japan
- Coordinates: 35°55′48″N 140°08′17″E
- Operator: (Ryūgasakishi Station); Kanto Railway (Sanuki Station)
- Lines: ■Jōban Line; ■Ryūgasaki Line
- Distance: 45.5 km from Nippori
- Platforms: 2 side + 2 island platforms
- Connections: Bus stop

Other information
- Status: Staffed (Midori no Madoguchi)
- Website: Official website

History
- Opened: August 14, 1900
- Rebuilt: 1985
- Former names: Sanuki (until 2020, JR station)

Passengers
- FY2019: 12,529(JR) daily

Services
Preceding station	JR East	Following station
Kashiwa JJ07 towards Shinagawa	Tokiwa	Ushiku towards Takahagi
Fujishiro towards Shinagawa	Jōban Line Special Rapid	Ushiku towards Tsuchiura
Fujishiro towards Shinagawa	Jōban Line Local-Futsuu	Ushiku towards Sendai
Preceding station	Kantō Railway	Following station
Terminus	Ryūgasaki Line	Ireji towards Ryūgasaki
Location
- Location within Ibaraki Prefecture Location within Japan

Ryūgasakishi Station (龍ケ崎市駅, Ryūgasakishi-eki) is a passenger railway station in the city of Ryūgasaki, Ibaraki, Japan operated jointly by the East Japan Railway Company (JR East) and by the private railway operator Kantō Railway. The Kantō Railway portion of the station is named Sanuki Station (佐貫駅, Sanuki-eki).

== Lines ==
Ryūgasakishi Station is served by the Jōban Line, and is located 45.5 km from the official starting point of the line at Nippori Station. Located in the same place, Sanuki Station is the terminus of the Kantō Railway Ryūgasaki Line, and is 4.5 kilometers from the opposing terminus of the line, Ryūgasaki Station. Kantō Railway also provides bus services from the station. Some limited express Tokiwa services stop at Ryūgasakishi.

== Layout ==
The JR East portion of the station (i.e. Ryūgasakishi Station) has one side platform and one island platform, connected to the elevated station building by a footbridge. The station has a Midori no Madoguchi ticket office. The Kantō Railway portion of the station (i.e. Sanuki Station) has one side platform.

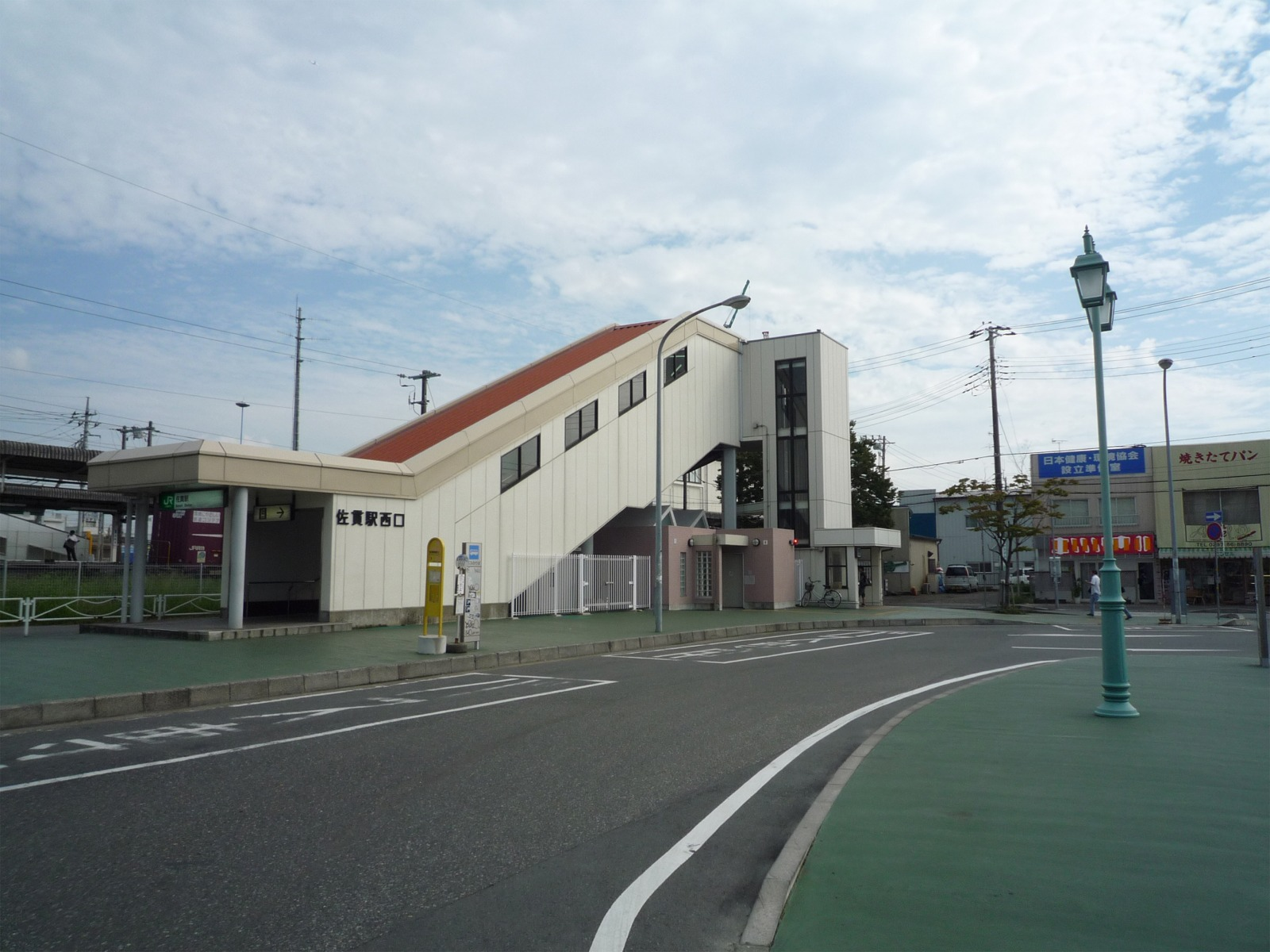
The west entrance in September 2008

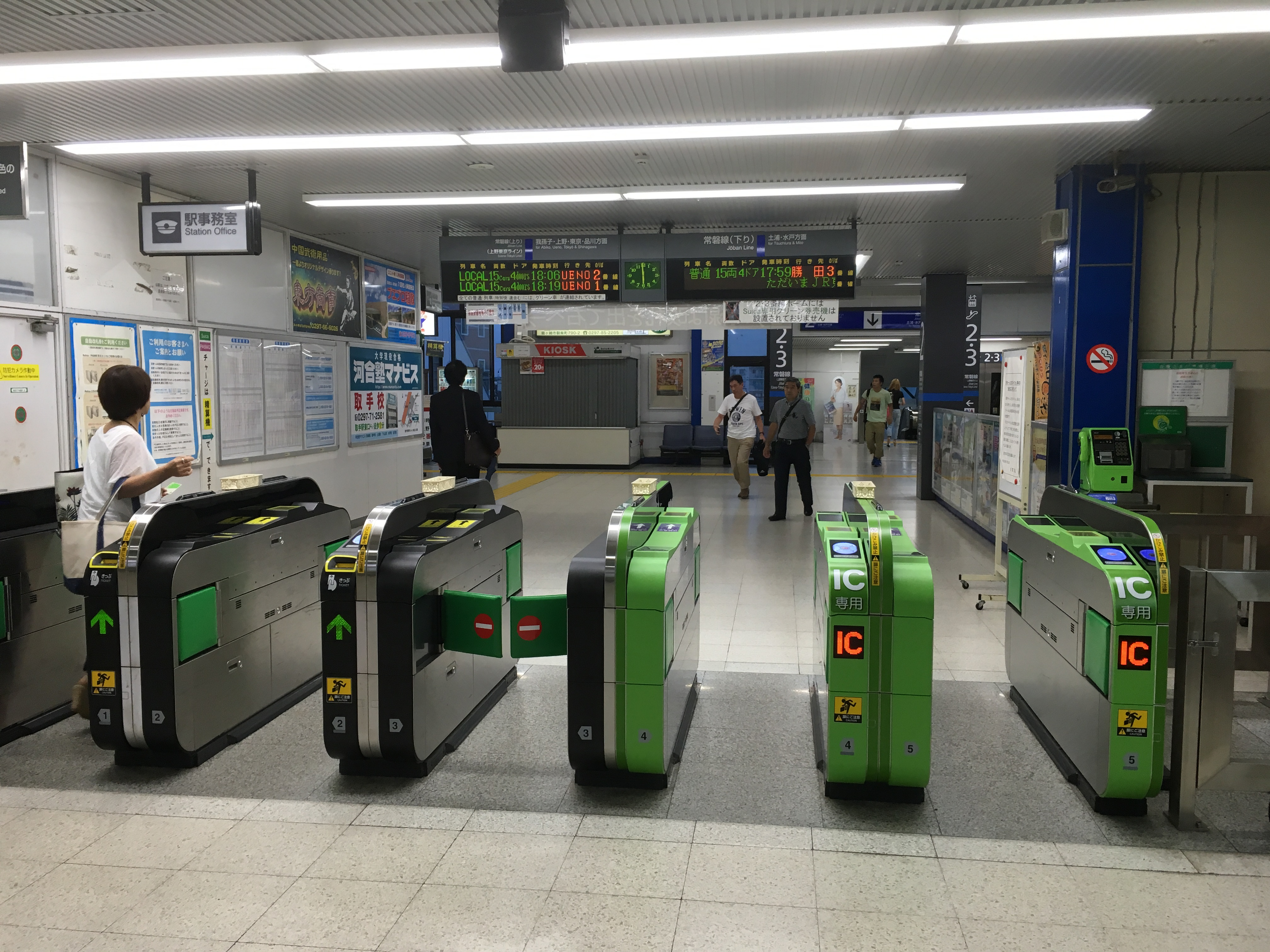
The JR East ticket barriers in August 2016

=== Platforms ===
==== Jōban Line Ryūgasakishi Station ====
1	■ Jōban Line ( Ueno-Tokyo Line)	for Toride, Kashiwa, Matsudo, Ueno, Tokyo and Shinagawa
1	■ Jōban Line (Tokiwa Limited Express)	for Ueno, Tokyo and Shinagawa
2	■ Jōban Line ( Ueno-Tokyo Line)	for Toride, Kashiwa, Matsudo, Ueno, Tokyo and Shinagawa
2	■ Jōban Line	for Tsuchiura, Ishioka, Mito, Takahagi and Iwaki
3	■ Jōban Line (Tokiwa Limited Express)	for Tsuchiura, Ishioka, Mito, Takahagi
3	■ Jōban Line	for Tsuchiura, Ishioka, Mito, Takahagi and Iwaki

==== Ryūgasaki Line Sanuki Station ====
1	■ Ryūgasaki Line	for Ryūgasaki

== History ==
The station opened as Sanuki Station on August 14, 1900. The current station building was completed in March 1985. The station was absorbed into the JR East network upon the privatization of the Japanese National Railways (JNR) on April 1, 1987.

On March 14, 2020, the JR station was renamed to Ryūgasakishi Station (龍ケ崎市駅, Ryūgasakishi-eki). The city of Ryūgasaki requested the name change and fully bore the cost of 410 million yen. However, the Kantō Railway chose to keep the original name of the station.

== Passenger statistics ==
In fiscal 2019, the station was used by an average of 12,529 passengers daily (boarding passengers only). The daily average passenger figures (boarding passengers only) for the JR East station in previous years are as shown below.

Fiscal year	Daily average
2000	16,842
2005	15,497
2010	14,550
2015	13,459

== Surrounding area ==
- National Route 6

== See also ==
- List of railway stations in Japan
