= Ryūgasaki =

Ryūgasaki 龍ケ崎市
- City
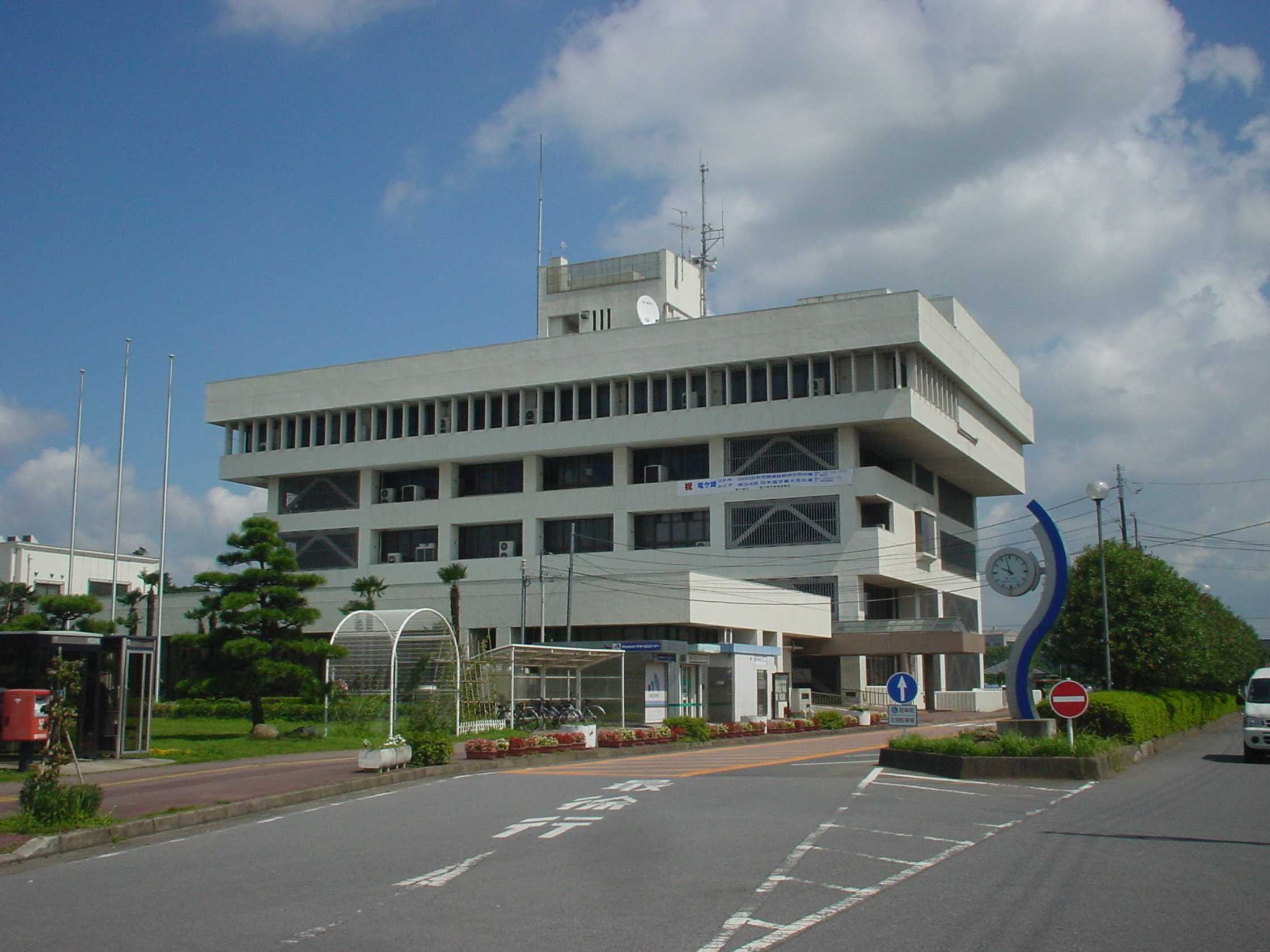
- Ryūgasaki city hall

- Flag Seal

- Location of Ryūgasaki in Ibaraki Prefecture

- Location within Japan
- Coordinates: 35°54′41.6″N 140°10′56.3″E
- Country: Japan
- Region: Kantō
- Prefecture: Ibaraki

Area
  - Total: 78.55 km^{2} (30.33 sq mi)

Population (January 2024)
  - Total: 75,212
  - Density: 957.5/km^{2} (2,480/sq mi)
- Time zone: UTC+9 (Japan Standard Time)
- Phone number: 0297-64-1111
- Address: 3710 Banchi, Ryūgasaki-shi, Ibaraki-ken 301-8611
- Climate: Cfa
- Website: Official website
- Symbols
- Bird: Swan
- Flower: Platycodon grandiflorus
- Tree: Pinus

Ryūgasaki (龍ケ崎市, Ryūgasaki-shi) is a city located in Ibaraki Prefecture, Japan. As of 1 January 2024, the city had an estimated population of 75,212 in 33,421 households and a population density of 958 persons per km^{2}. The percentage of the population aged over 65 was 31.1% in July 2020. The total area of the city is 78.59 square kilometres (30.34 sq mi).

== Geography ==
Ryūgasaki is located in southern Ibaraki Prefecture, in the low-lying flatlands south of Lake Kasumigaura. The Kokai River runs through the western part of the city, and the basin is dotted with tributaries and lakes. Lake Ushiku, despite its name, is entirely within the city of Ryūgasaki.

=== Surrounding municipalities ===
Ibaraki Prefecture

- Inashiki
- Kawachi
- Tone
- Toride
- Tsukuba
- Tsukubamirai
- Ushiku

=== Climate ===
Ryūgasaki has a Humid continental climate (Köppen Cfa) characterized by warm summers and cool winters with light snowfall. The average annual temperature in Ryūgasaki is 14.5 °C (58.1 °F). The average annual rainfall is 1,352.8 mm (53.26 in) with October as the wettest month. The temperatures are highest on average in August, at around 25.8 °C (78.4 °F), and lowest in January, at around 3.3 °C (37.9 °F).

Climate data for Ryūgasaki (1991−2020 normals, extremes 1978−present)
Month	Jan	Feb	Mar	Apr	May	Jun	Jul	Aug	Sep	Oct	Nov	Dec	Year
Record high °C (°F)	19.2 (66.6)	24.4 (75.9)	25.9 (78.6)	29.3 (84.7)	34.0 (93.2)	35.3 (95.5)	38.4 (101.1)	38.5 (101.3)	36.1 (97.0)	32.5 (90.5)	24.7 (76.5)	24.1 (75.4)	38.5 (101.3)
Mean daily maximum °C (°F)	9.4 (48.9)	10.2 (50.4)	13.5 (56.3)	18.6 (65.5)	22.9 (73.2)	25.4 (77.7)	29.4 (84.9)	30.9 (87.6)	27.2 (81.0)	21.8 (71.2)	16.7 (62.1)	11.7 (53.1)	19.8 (67.7)
Daily mean °C (°F)	3.3 (37.9)	4.3 (39.7)	7.8 (46.0)	13.0 (55.4)	17.8 (64.0)	21.0 (69.8)	24.6 (76.3)	25.8 (78.4)	22.5 (72.5)	16.9 (62.4)	10.9 (51.6)	5.5 (41.9)	14.5 (58.0)
Mean daily minimum °C (°F)	−2.3 (27.9)	−1.2 (29.8)	2.3 (36.1)	7.5 (45.5)	13.5 (56.3)	17.5 (63.5)	21.2 (70.2)	22.2 (72.0)	18.8 (65.8)	12.6 (54.7)	5.6 (42.1)	0.0 (32.0)	9.8 (49.7)
Record low °C (°F)	−15.5 (4.1)	−8.5 (16.7)	−5.9 (21.4)	−2.5 (27.5)	2.9 (37.2)	10.1 (50.2)	12.7 (54.9)	15.2 (59.4)	6.6 (43.9)	0.3 (32.5)	−3.9 (25.0)	−7.6 (18.3)	−15.5 (4.1)
Average precipitation mm (inches)	55.4 (2.18)	52.9 (2.08)	103.3 (4.07)	109.0 (4.29)	122.6 (4.83)	135.1 (5.32)	128.1 (5.04)	99.4 (3.91)	182.8 (7.20)	212.8 (8.38)	87.5 (3.44)	53.4 (2.10)	1,352.8 (53.26)
Average precipitation days (≥ 1.0 mm)	5.3	6.2	10.0	10.4	10.4	11.6	10.3	7.2	11.2	10.5	7.9	5.7	106.7
Mean monthly sunshine hours	190.8	172.3	174.3	178.4	179.9	125.7	155.7	183.5	133.9	134.0	148.4	169.1	1,927.9
Source: Japan Meteorological Agency

== Demographics ==
Per Japanese census data, the population of Ryūgasaki has recently plateaued after several decades of growth.

Historical population
Year	Pop.	±%
1950	34,528	—
1960	33,581	−2.7%
1970	37,267	+11.0%
1980	43,132	+15.7%
1990	57,238	+32.7%
2000	76,923	+34.4%
2010	80,334	+4.4%
2020	76,420	−4.9%

== History ==
The name "Ryūgasaki" can be traced back to 1182 when the samurai clan ruling the territory adopted "Ryūgasaki" as their family name. The northern half of the city was an exclave of Sendai Domain during the Edo period, the region joined Miyazaku Prefecture in 1869 before merging with Ibaraki Prefecture in 1875. The southern portion of the city was part of Kitasōma District in Shimōsa Province, as the boundary between Shimōsa and Hitachi Province had been established in the Nara period as the Tone River. However, by the Meiji period, the course of the river had shifted, leaving the area of present-day southern Ryūgasaki on the northern bank of the river. This area was transferred to Ibaraki Prefecture in 1875

The town of Ryūgasaki was created with the establishment of the modern municipalities system on April 1, 1889.

The city was formed on March 20, 1954, when the aforementioned town merged with: Nareshiba, Ōmiya, Yabara, Nagato, Kawarashiro and Kitamonma. In February 1955, the city grew to its present size when a proportion of Takasu merged with the city.

In 1974, the city adopted the Swan, the Pinus, and Platycodon grandiflorus as its city symbols for bird, tree and flower respectively.

== Government ==
Ryūgasaki has a mayor-council form of government with a directly elected mayor and a unicameral city council of 22 members. Ryūgasaki, together with neighboring Tone, contributes two members to the Ibaraki Prefectural Assembly. In terms of national politics, the city is part of Ibaraki 3rd district of the lower house of the Diet of Japan.

The 20th and current mayor is (萩原 勇) Isamu Hagiwara, who assumed the position on January 18, 2022. Issei Nakayama (中山 一生) was the seventeenth to nineteenth mayor, beginning in January 2010.

== Economy ==
New Central Airlines, a commuter airline, is headquartered in the city, on the grounds of Ryūgasaki Airfield, although no commercial flights are scheduled from the city.

== Education ==
- Ryutsu Keizai University
- Ryūgasaki has 11 public elementary schools and six public middle schools operated by the city government. There are one public middle school and three public high schools operated by the Ibaraki Prefectural Board of Education as well as one private high school.

== Transportation ==
=== Railway ===
JR East – Jōban Line

- Sanuki

Kantō Railway - Ryūgasaki Line

- Sanuki - Ireji - Ryūgasaki

=== Highway ===
- National Route 6

=== Airport ===
- Ryūgasaki Airfield – however, no scheduled commercial services

== Notable people from Ryūgasaki ==
- Yuta Nakayama, professional football player
- Akiyo Noguchi, retired professional rock climber, olympic bronze medalist, seven-time IFSC Climbing World Cup champion
- Isao Okano, judoka, Olympic gold medalist
- Nana Suzuki, model
- Kisenosato Yutaka, the 72nd yokozuna in sumo wrestling
