= Mashiko Station =

Railway station in Mashiko, Tochigi Prefecture, Japan

Mashiko Station 益子駅
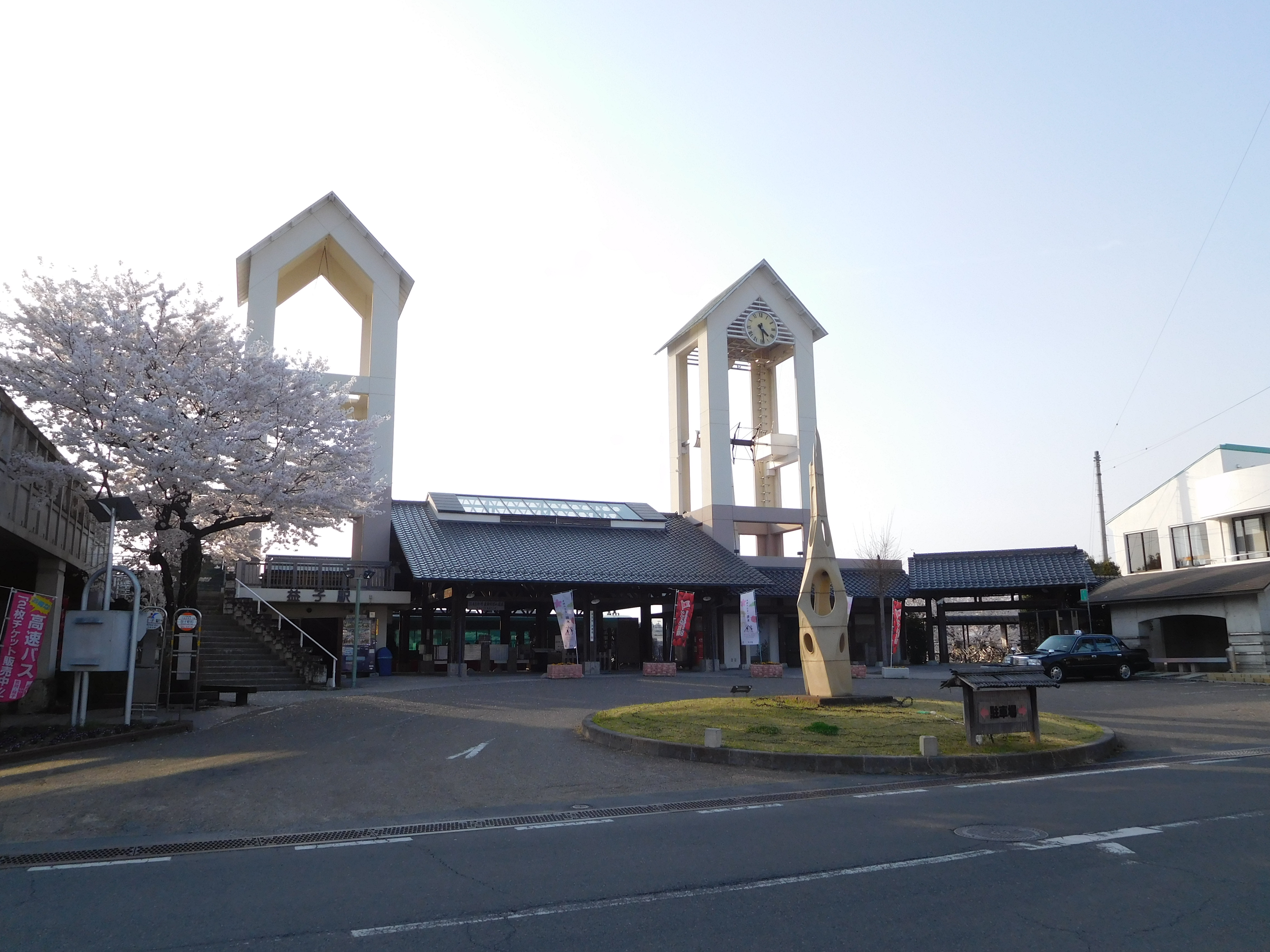
- Mashiko Station (April 2018)

General information
- Location: Mashiko 1591-2, Mashiko, Haga, Tochigi （栃木県芳賀郡益子町大字益子1591-2） Japan
- Coordinates: 36.4627°N 140.0883°E
- Operator: Mooka Railway
- Line: Mooka Line
- Platforms: 1 (1 side platform)

History
- Opened: July 11, 1913

Passengers
- FY 2015: 150 daily

Services
Preceding station	Mooka Railway	Following station
Nishidai towards Shimodate	SL Mooka	Nanai towards Motegi
Kitayama towards Shimodate	Mooka Line	Nanai towards Motegi
Location

Mashiko Station (益子駅, Mashiko-eki) is a railway station in Mashiko, Tochigi Prefecture, Japan, operated by the Mooka Railway.

== Lines ==
Mashiko Station is a station on the Mooka Line, and is located 25.1 rail kilometers from the terminus of the line at Shimodate Station.

== Station layout ==
Mashiko Station has a single side platform serving traffic in both directions.

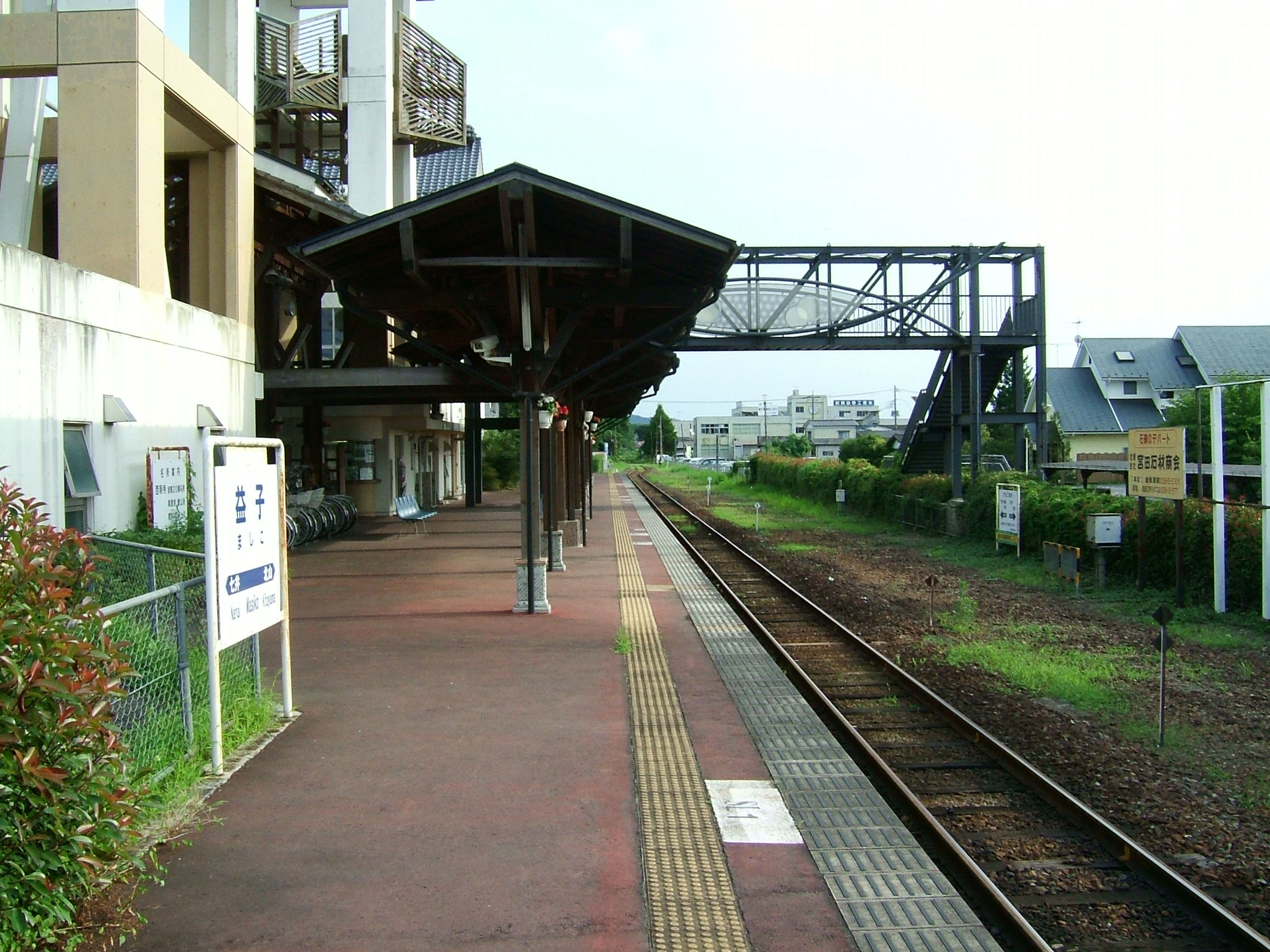
The station platform (July 2008)

== History ==
Mashiko Station opened on 11 July 1913 as a station on the Japanese Government Railway, which subsequently became the Japanese National Railways (JNR). The station was absorbed into the JR East network upon the privatization of the JNR on 1 April 1987, and the Mooka Railway from 11 April 1988. A new station building was completed in March 1988.

== Surrounding area ==
- Mashiko Town Hall
- Mashiko Post Office
- Japan National Route 121
- Japan National Route 294
