= Mōka Station =

Railway station in Mooka, Tochigi Prefecture, Japan

Coordinates: 36°26′22.05″N 140°0′10.45″E

Mooka Station 真岡駅
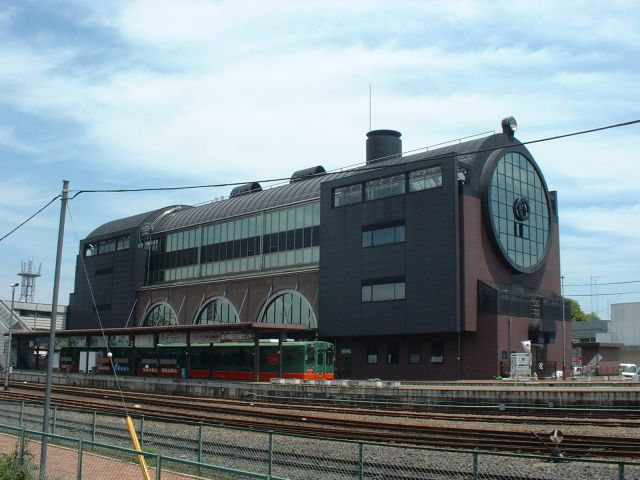
- Mooka Station (May 2005)

General information
- Location: Daimachi 2474-1, Mooka, Tochigi （栃木県真岡市台町2474-1） Japan
- Operator: Mooka Railway
- Line: Mooka Line
- Platforms: 3 (1 island platform, 1 side platform)

History
- Opened: 1912

Passengers
- FY 2012: 516 daily

Services
Preceding station	Mooka Railway	Following station
Terauchi towards Shimodate	SL Mooka	Nishidai towards Motegi
Terauchi towards Shimodate	Mooka Line	Kitamōka towards Motegi
Location

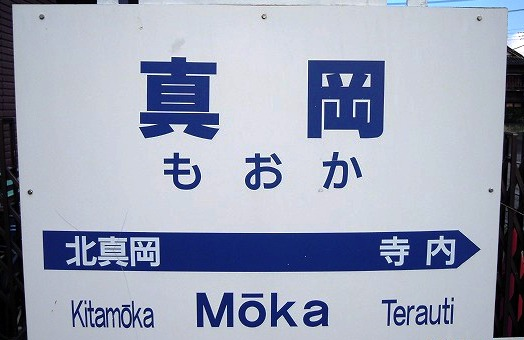
Station sign, もおか = Mooka.

Mooka Station (真岡駅, Mooka-eki) is a railway station in Mooka, Tochigi Prefecture, Japan, operated by the Mooka Railway.

== Lines ==
Mooka Station is a station on the Mooka Line, and is located 16.4 rail kilometers from the terminus of the line at Shimodate Station.

== Station layout ==
Mooka Station has one island platform and one side platform serving three tracks in total.

== History ==
Mooka Station opened on 1 April 1912 as a station on the Japanese Government Railway, which subsequently became the Japanese National Railways (JNR). The station was absorbed into the JR East network upon the privatization of the JNR on 1 April 1987, and the Mooka Railway from 11 April 1988. The current station building was completed in 1997 and resembles a steam locomotive in appearance.

== Surrounding area ==
- Japan National Route 294
- Mooka City Hall
- Mooka Post Office
