= Nishidai Station (Tochigi) =

Railway station in Mooka, Tochigi Prefecture, Japan

Nishidai Station 西田井駅
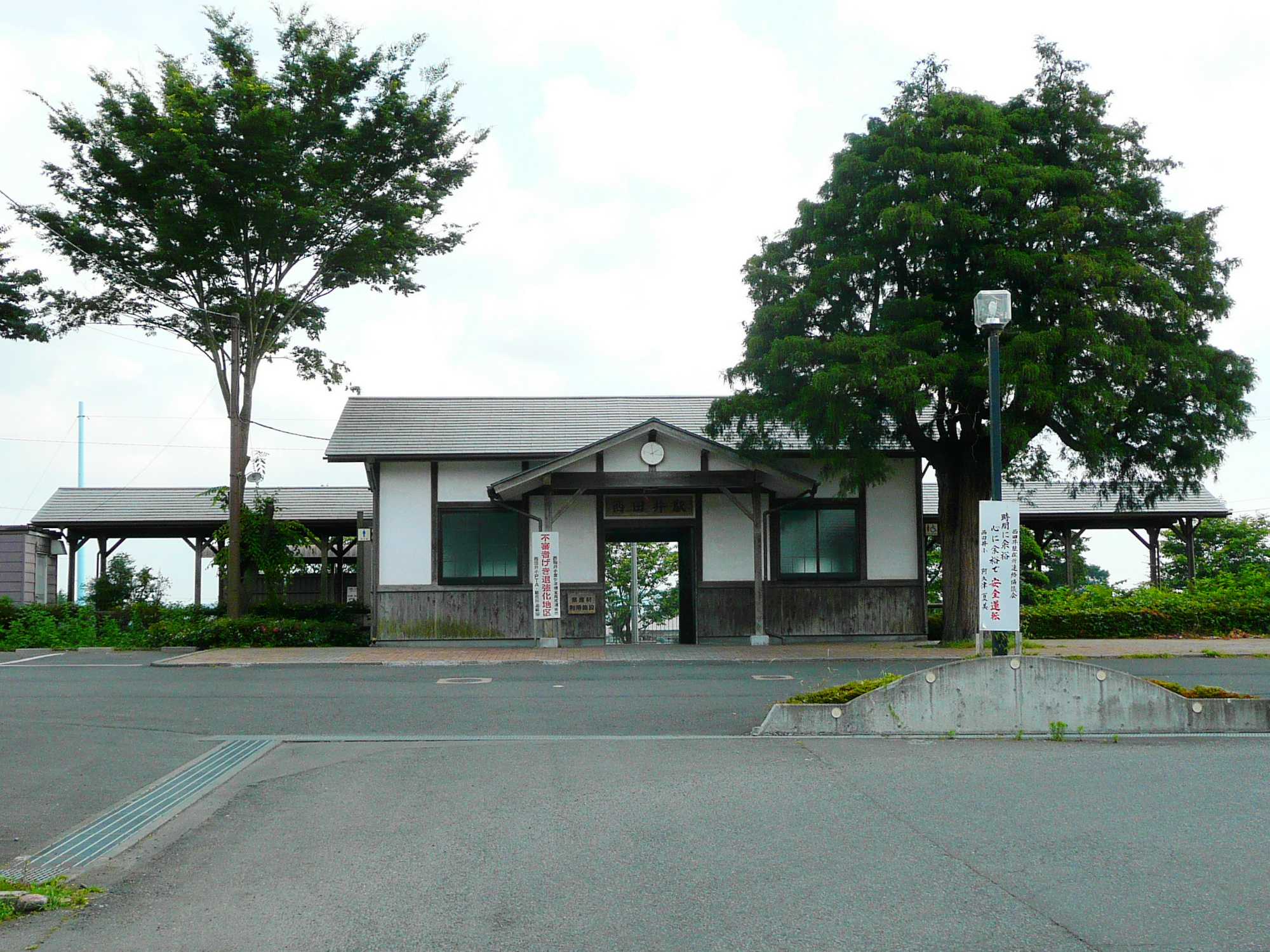
- Nishidai Station (June 2008)

General information
- Location: Nishidai 2136-6, Mooka, Tochigi （栃木県真岡市西田井2136-6） Japan
- Coordinates: 36.4535°N 140.0485°E
- Operator: Mooka Railway
- Line: Mooka Line
- Platforms: 2 (2 side platforms)

History
- Opened: July 11, 1913

Passengers
- FY 2015: 19 daily

Services
Preceding station	Mooka Railway	Following station
Mōka towards Shimodate	SL Mooka	Mashiko towards Motegi
Kitamōka towards Shimodate	Mooka Line	Kitayama towards Motegi
Location

Nishidai Station (西田井駅, Nishidai-eki) is a railway station in Mooka, Tochigi Prefecture, Japan, operated by the Mooka Railway.

== Lines ==
Nishidai Station is a station on the Mooka Line, and is located 21.2 rail kilometers from the terminus of the line at Shimodate Station.

== Station layout ==
Nishidai Station has two opposed side platforms connected to the station building by a level crossing. The station is unattended.

== History ==
Nishidai Station opened on 11 July 1913 as a station on the Japanese Government Railway, which subsequently became the Japanese National Railways (JNR). The station was absorbed into the JR East network upon the privatization of the JNR on 1 April 1987, and the Mooka Railway from 11 April 1988. A new station building was completed in March 1998.

== Surrounding area ==
- Japan National Route 294
- Mooka Nishidai Post Office
