= Shimodate-Nikōmae Station =

Railway station in Chikusei, Ibaraki Prefecture, Japan

Shimodate-Nikōmae Station 下館二高前駅
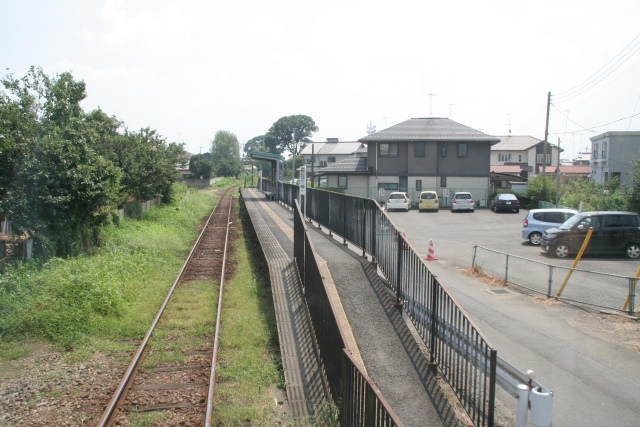
- Shimodate-Nikōmae Station in August 2008

General information
- Location: Okazeri 848-3, Chikusei-shi, Ibaraki-ken 308-0051; Japan
- Coordinates: 36.3192°N 139.9720°E
- Operator: Mooka Railway
- Line: ■ Mooka Line
- Distance: 2.2 km from Shimodate
- Platforms: 1 side platform

Other information
- Status: Unstaffed
- Website: Official website

History
- Opened: 11 April 1988

Passengers
- FY2018: 49 daily

Services
Preceding station	Mooka Railway	Following station
Shimodate Terminus	Mooka Line	Orimoto towards Motegi
Location
- Location within Ibaraki Prefecture Location within Japan

Shimodate-Nikōmae Station (下館二高前駅, Shimodate-Nikōmae-eki) is a passenger train station in the city of Chikusei, Ibaraki, Japan, operated by the third sector railway company Mooka Railway.

== Lines ==
Shimodate-Nikōmae Station is a station on the Mooka Line, and is located 2.2 rail kilometers from the terminus of the line at Shimodate Station.

== Station layout ==
The station consists of a single side platform serving traffic in both directions. The station is unattended.

== History ==
Shimodate-Nikōmae Station opened on 11 April 1988.

== Passenger statistics ==
In fiscal 2018, the station was used by an average of 49 passengers daily (boarding passengers only).

== Surrounding area ==
- National Route 294

== See also ==
- List of railway stations in Japan
