= Kitayama Station (Tochigi) =

Railway station in Mooka, Tochigi Prefecture, Japan

Kitayama Station 北山駅
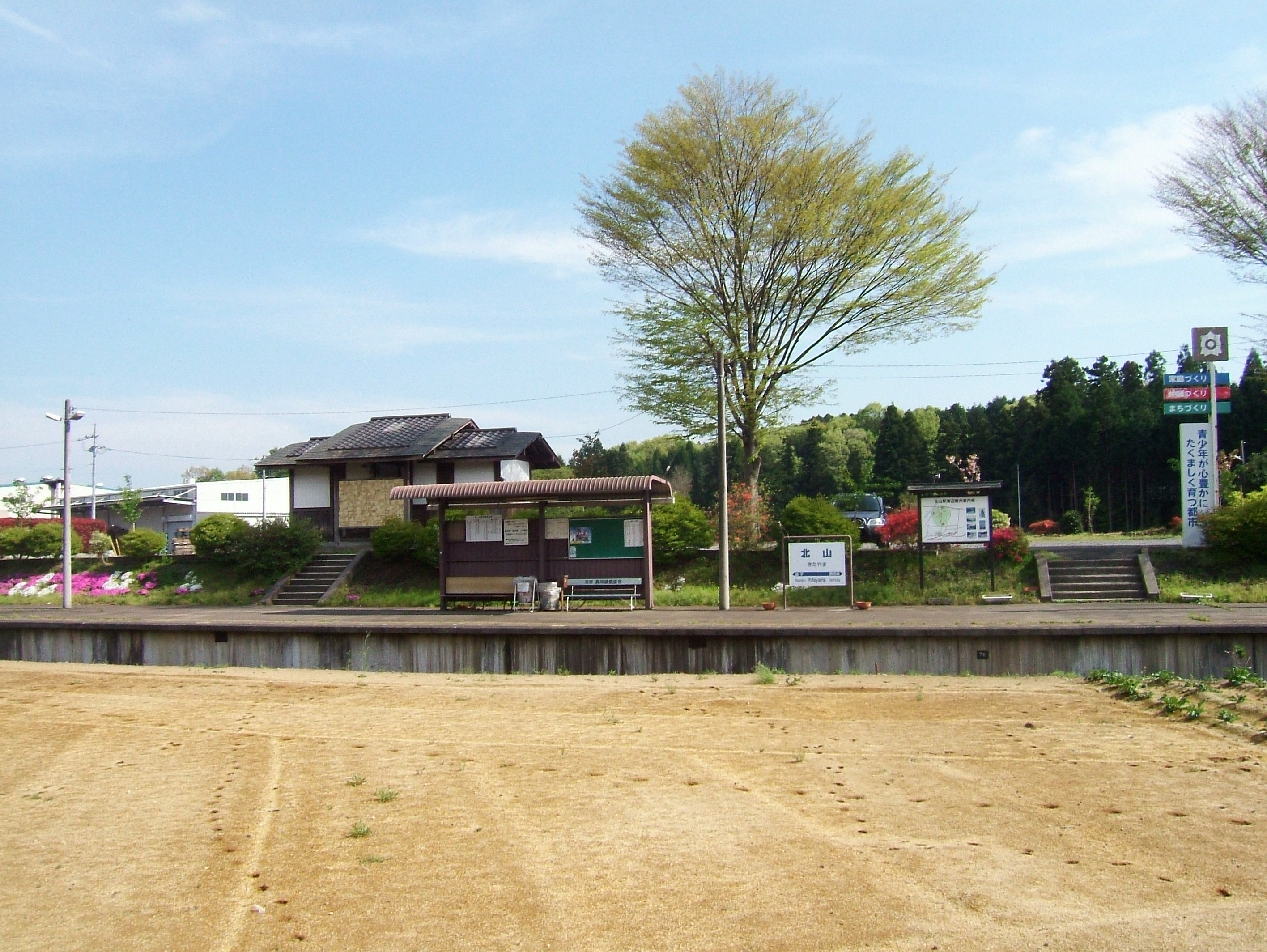
- Kitayama Station (April 2007)

General information
- Location: Nishidai Kitayama 778-3, Mooka, Tochigi （栃木県真岡市西田井北山778-3） Japan
- Coordinates: 36°27′20″N 140°04′04″E
- Operator: Mooka Railway
- Line: Mooka Line
- Platforms: 1 (1 side platform)

History
- Opened: March 11, 1989

Passengers
- FY 2015: 41 daily

Services
Preceding station	Mooka Railway	Following station
Nishidai towards Shimodate	Mooka Line	Mashiko towards Motegi
Location

Kitayama Station (北山駅, Kitayama-eki) is a railway station in Mooka, Tochigi Prefecture, Japan, operated by the Mooka Railway.

== Lines ==
Kitayama Station is a station on the Mooka Line, and is located 22.9 rail kilometers from the terminus of the line at Shimodate Station.

== Station layout ==
Kitayama Station has a single side platform serving traffic in both directions. The station building is located on a slight embankment. The station is unattended.

== History ==
Kitayama Station opened on 11 March 1989.

== Surrounding area ==
- Japan National Route 294
- Nemotoyama (a famous local cherry blossom viewing spot)
- Local strawberry picking facilities (the station is colloquially known as a "strawberry station" in early spring)
