= Terauchi Station =

Railway station in Mooka, Tochigi Prefecture, Japan

Coordinates: 36.4110°N 139.9798°E

Terauchi Station 寺内駅
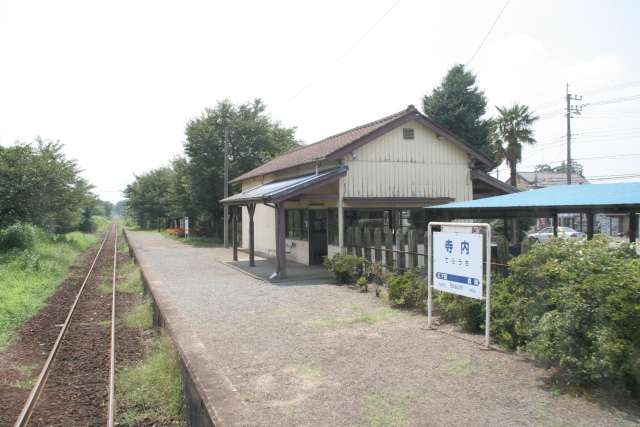
- Terauchi Station (August 2008)

General information
- Location: Terauchi 830-4, Mooka, Tochigi （栃木県真岡市寺内830-4） Japan
- Operator: Mooka Railway
- Line: Mooka Line
- Platforms: 1 (1 side platform)

History
- Opened: 1912

Passengers
- FY 2012: 45 daily

Services
Preceding station	Mooka Railway	Following station
Kugeta towards Shimodate	SL Mooka	Mōka towards Motegi
Kugeta towards Shimodate	Mooka Line	Mōka towards Motegi
Location

Terauchi Station (寺内駅, Terauchi-eki) is a railway station in Mooka, Tochigi Prefecture, Japan, operated by the Mooka Railway.

== Lines ==
Terauchi Station is a station on the Mooka Line, and is located 12.6 rail kilometers from the terminus of the line at Shimodate Station.

== Station layout ==
Terauchi Station has one side platform serving traffic in both directions. The station is unattended.

== History ==
Terauchi Station opened on 1 April 1912 as a station on the Japanese Government Railway, which subsequently became the Japanese National Railways (JNR). The station was absorbed into the JR East network upon the privatization of the JNR on 1 April 1987, and the Mooka Railway from 11 April 1988.

== Surrounding area ==
- Japan National Route 294
- Japan National Route 408
