= Nanai Station =

Railway station in Mashiko, Tochigi Prefecture, Japan

Nanai Station 七井駅
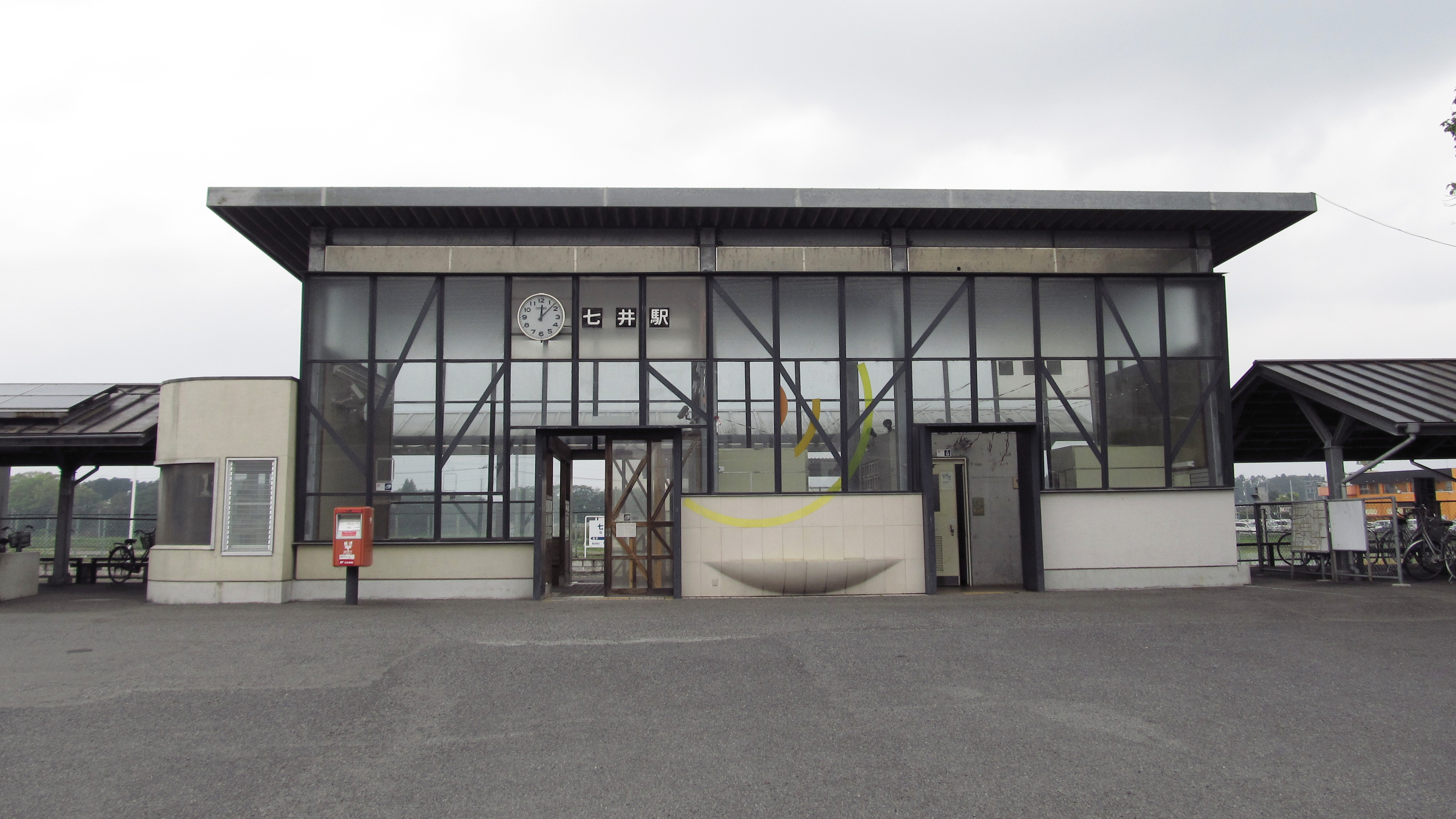
- Nanai Station (May 2015)

General information
- Location: Osawa 1415-2, Mashiko, Haga, Tochigi （栃木県芳賀郡益子町大字大沢1415-2） Japan
- Coordinates: 36.4919°N 140.0943°E
- Operator: Mooka Railway
- Line: Mooka Line
- Platforms: 2 (2 side platforms)

History
- Opened: June 11, 1913

Passengers
- FY 2015: 143 daily

Services
Preceding station	Mooka Railway	Following station
Mashiko towards Shimodate	SL Mooka	Tatara towards Motegi
Mashiko towards Shimodate	Mooka Line	Tatara towards Motegi
Location

Nanai Station (七井駅, Nanai-eki) is a railway station in Mashiko, Tochigi Prefecture, Japan, operated by the Mooka Railway.

== Lines ==
Nanai Station is a station on the Mooka Line, and is located 28.4 rail kilometers from the terminus of the line at Shimodate Station.

== Station layout ==
Nanai Station has two opposed side platforms connected to the station building by a level crossing. The station is unattended.

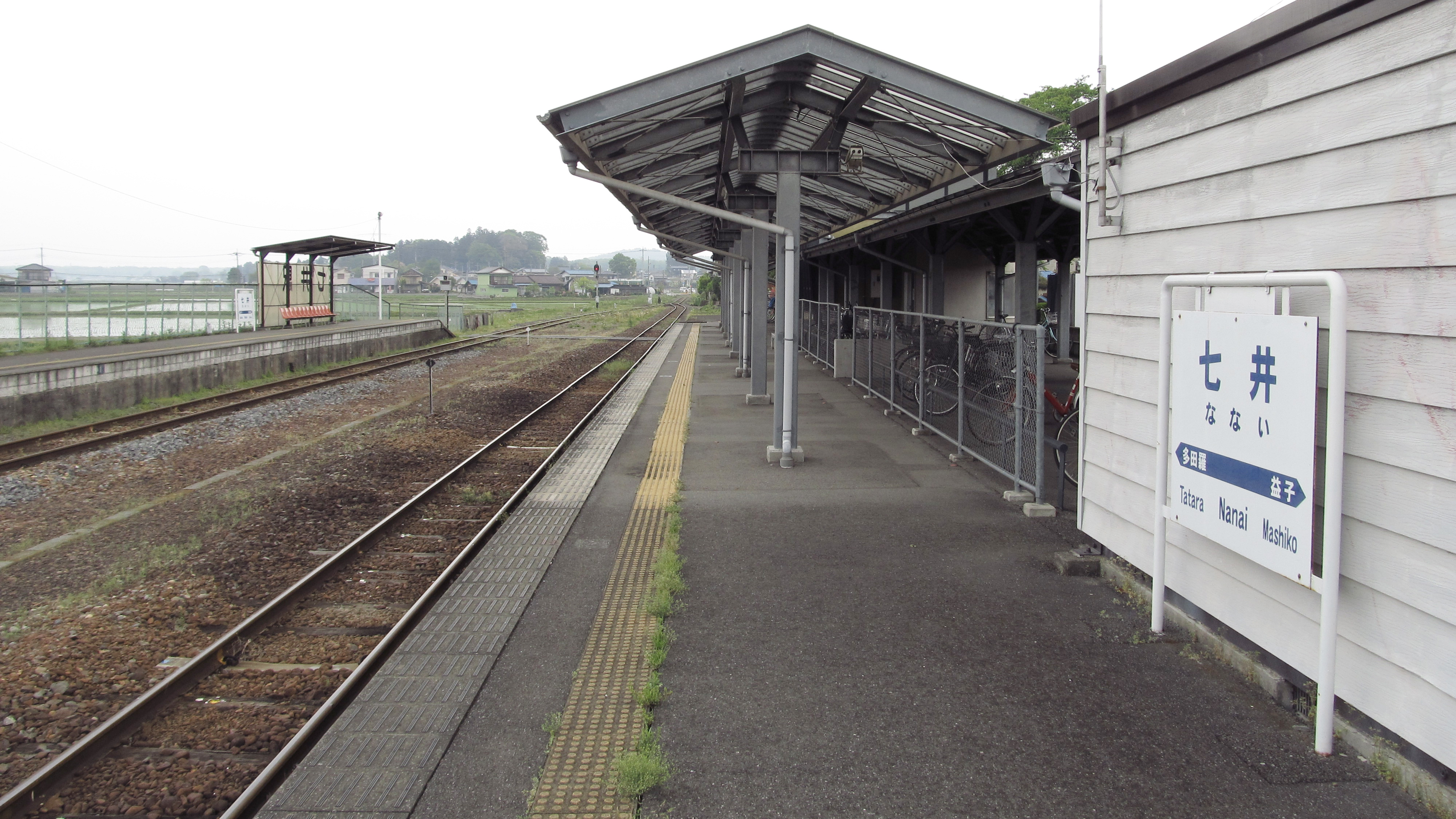
The station platforms (May 2015)

== History ==
Nanai Station opened on 11 July 1913 as a station on the Japanese Government Railway, which subsequently became the Japanese National Railways (JNR). The station was absorbed into the JR East network upon the privatization of the JNR on 1 April 1987, and the Mooka Railway from 11 April 1988. The original station building burned down in 2000, and a new one was built later that year.

== Surrounding area ==
- Nanai Post Office
- Japan National Route 123
