= Orimoto Station =

Railway station in Chikusei, Ibaraki Prefecture, Japan

Orimoto Station 折本駅
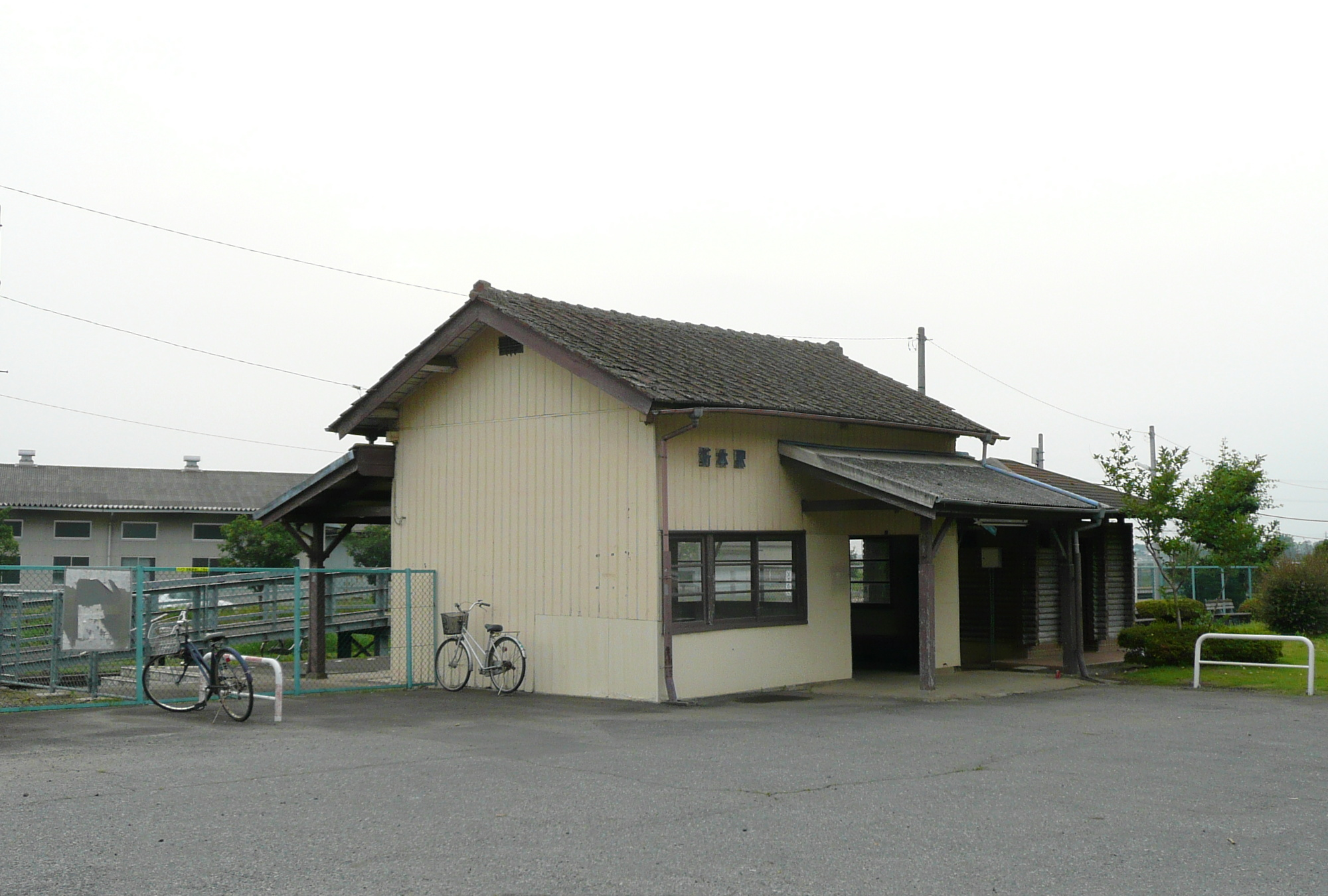
- Orimoto Station in June 2008

General information
- Location: Orimoto 322-4, Chikusei-shi, Ibaraki-ken 308-0006; Japan
- Coordinates: 36.3405°N 139.9713°E
- Operator: Mooka Railway
- Line: ■ Mooka Line
- Distance: 4.6 km from Shimodate
- Platforms: 2 (2 side platforms)
- Tracks: 2

Other information
- Status: Unstaffed
- Website: Official website

History
- Opened: 1 April 1912

Passengers
- FY2018: 19 daily

Services
Preceding station	Mooka Railway	Following station
Shimodate Terminus	SL Mooka	Kugeta towards Motegi
Shimodate-Nikōmae towards Shimodate	Mooka Line	Higuchi towards Motegi
Location
- Location within Ibaraki Prefecture Location within Japan

Orimoto Station (折本駅, Orimoto-eki) is a passenger train station in the city of Chikusei, Ibaraki, Japan, operated by the third sector railway company Mooka Railway.

== Lines ==
Orimoto Station is a station on the Mooka Line, and is located 4.6 rail kilometers from the terminus of the line at Shimodate Station.

== Station layout ==
The station consists of two opposed side platforms connected to the station building by a level crossing. The station is unattended.

== History ==
Orimoto Station opened on 1 April 1912.

== Passenger statistics ==
In fiscal 2018, the station was used by an average of 19 passengers daily (boarding passengers only).

== Surrounding area ==
- National Route 294
- Shimodate Orimoto Post Office

== See also ==
- List of railway stations in Japan
