= Kitamōka Station =

Railway station in Mooka, Tochigi Prefecture, Japan

Kitamōka Station 北真岡駅
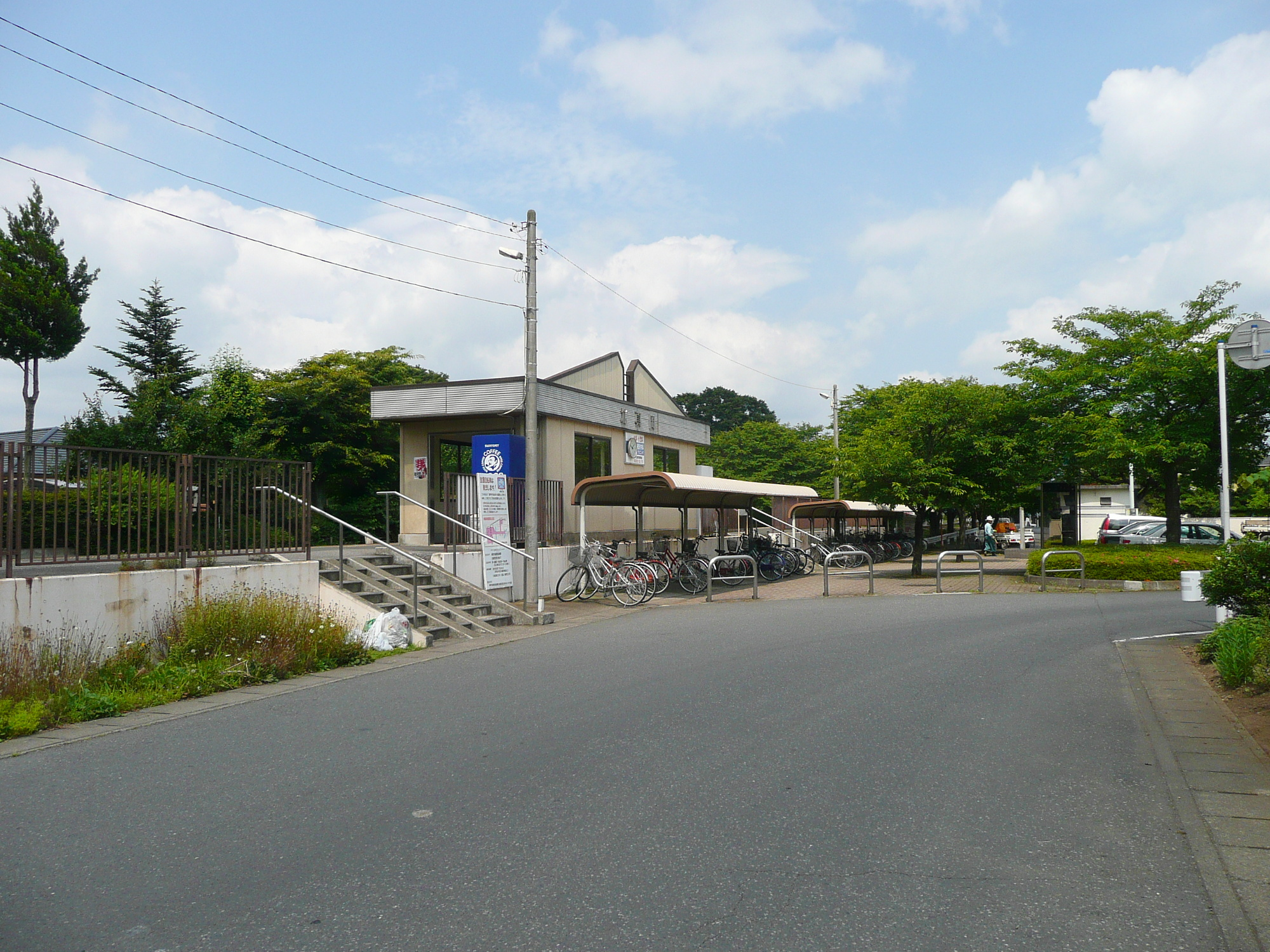
- Kitamōka Station (June 2008)

General information
- Location: Kumakura 908-10, Mooka, Tochigi （栃木県真岡市熊倉町908-10） Japan
- Coordinates: 36.4489°N 140.0141°E
- Operator: Mooka Railway
- Line: Mooka Line
- Platforms: 1 (1 side platform)

History
- Opened: April 1, 1955

Passengers
- FY 2015: 85 daily

Services
Preceding station	Mooka Railway	Following station
Mōka towards Shimodate	Mooka Line	Nishidai towards Motegi
Location

Kitamōka Station (北真岡駅, Kitamōka-eki) is a railway station in Mooka, Tochigi Prefecture, Japan, operated by the Mooka Railway.

== Lines ==
Kitamōka Station is a station on the Mooka Line, and is located 18.0 rail kilometers from the terminus of the line at Shimodate Station.

== Station layout ==
Kitamōka Station has a single side platform serving traffic in both directions. A shelter is provided on the platform, and parking is available for bikes and cars. The station is unstaffed.

== History ==
Kitamōka Station opened on 1 April 1955 as a station on the Japanese National Railways (JNR). The station was absorbed into the JR East network upon the privatization of the JNR on 1 April 1987, and then the Mooka Railway on 11 April 1988.

== Surrounding area ==
- Japan National Route 294
- Mooka Nishidai Post Office
