= Monobe =

Monobe (物部) is the name of two former towns in Japan:

- Monobe, Kochi in Kochi Prefecture (now Kami, Kochi)
- Monobe, Tochigi in Tochigi Prefecture (now Ninomiya, Tochigi)
