= Tatara Station =

Tatara Station is the name of two train stations in Japan:

- Tatara Station (Gunma) (多々良駅)
- Tatara Station (Tochigi) (多田羅駅)
