= Rei-kyō =

Japanese bronze mirror

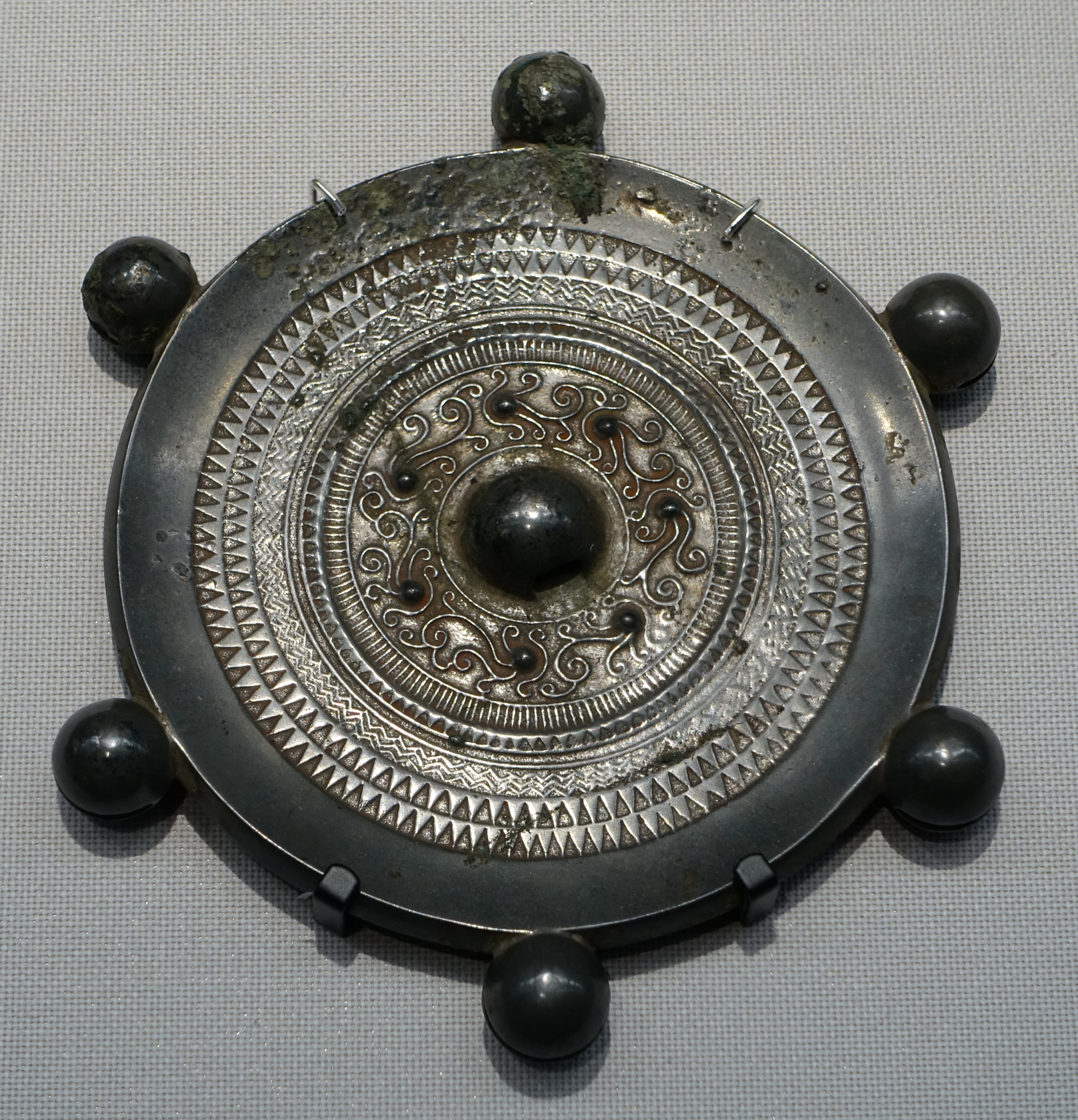
Rei-kyō, excavated from Ueno Kofun (Chikusei, Ibaraki).

Rei-kyō (Japanese: 鈴鏡, lit. 'bell mirror') is an ancient type of Japanese round bronze mirror made in the late Kofun period (5th – 6th century). The mirror is so named because it has bells around its perimeter.

== History ==
Rei-kyō is a Chinese-style bronze mirror made in the Japanese archipelago, whose perimeter is surrounded by four to ten bells with pebbles inside. Chinese-style bronze mirrors made outside of China are called imitation mirrors (仿製鏡, bōsei-kyō), and rei-kyō is one of them. It is an instrument intended to make sound, and haniwa (clay figurines) with a mirror of this style on their waist have been excavated. Rei-kyō loses its original purpose as a mirror, and this fact suggests that mirrors were regarded as tools for spells in Wa at that time.

== In popular culture ==
The Pokémon Bronzor is based on a rei-kyō.
