= Tatara Station (Tochigi) =

Railway station in Ichikai, Tochigi Prefecture, Japan

Tatara Station 多田羅駅
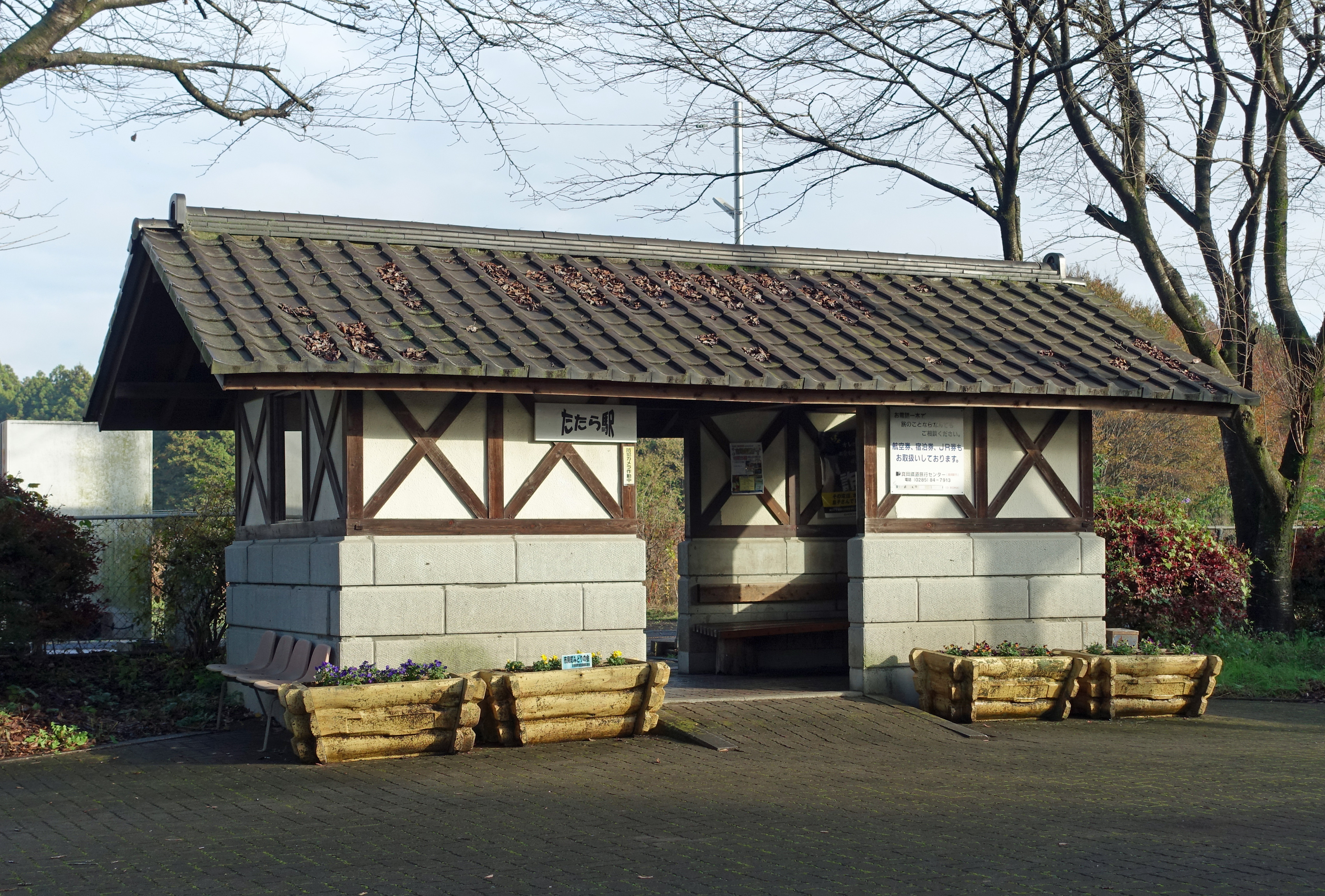
- Tatara Station (November 2015)

General information
- Location: Tatara 770-4, Ichikai, Haga, Tochigi （栃木県芳賀郡市貝町多田羅770-4） Japan
- Coordinates: 36.5161°N 140.0898°E
- Operator: Mooka Railway
- Line: Mooka Line
- Platforms: 1 (1 side platform)

History
- Opened: April 1, 1955

Passengers
- FY 2015: 82 daily

Services
| Preceding station | Mooka Railway | Following station |
|---|---|---|
| Nanai towards Shimodate | SL Mooka | Ichihana towards Motegi |
| Nanai towards Shimodate | Mooka Line | Ichihana towards Motegi |
Location

Tatara Station (多田羅駅, Tatara-eki) is a railway station in Ichikai, Tochigi Prefecture, Japan, operated by the Mooka Railway.

== Lines ==
Tatara Station is a station on the Mooka Line, and is located 31.2 rail kilometers from the terminus of the line at Shimodate Station.

== Station layout ==
Tatara Station has a single side platform serving traffic in both directions. The station is unattended.

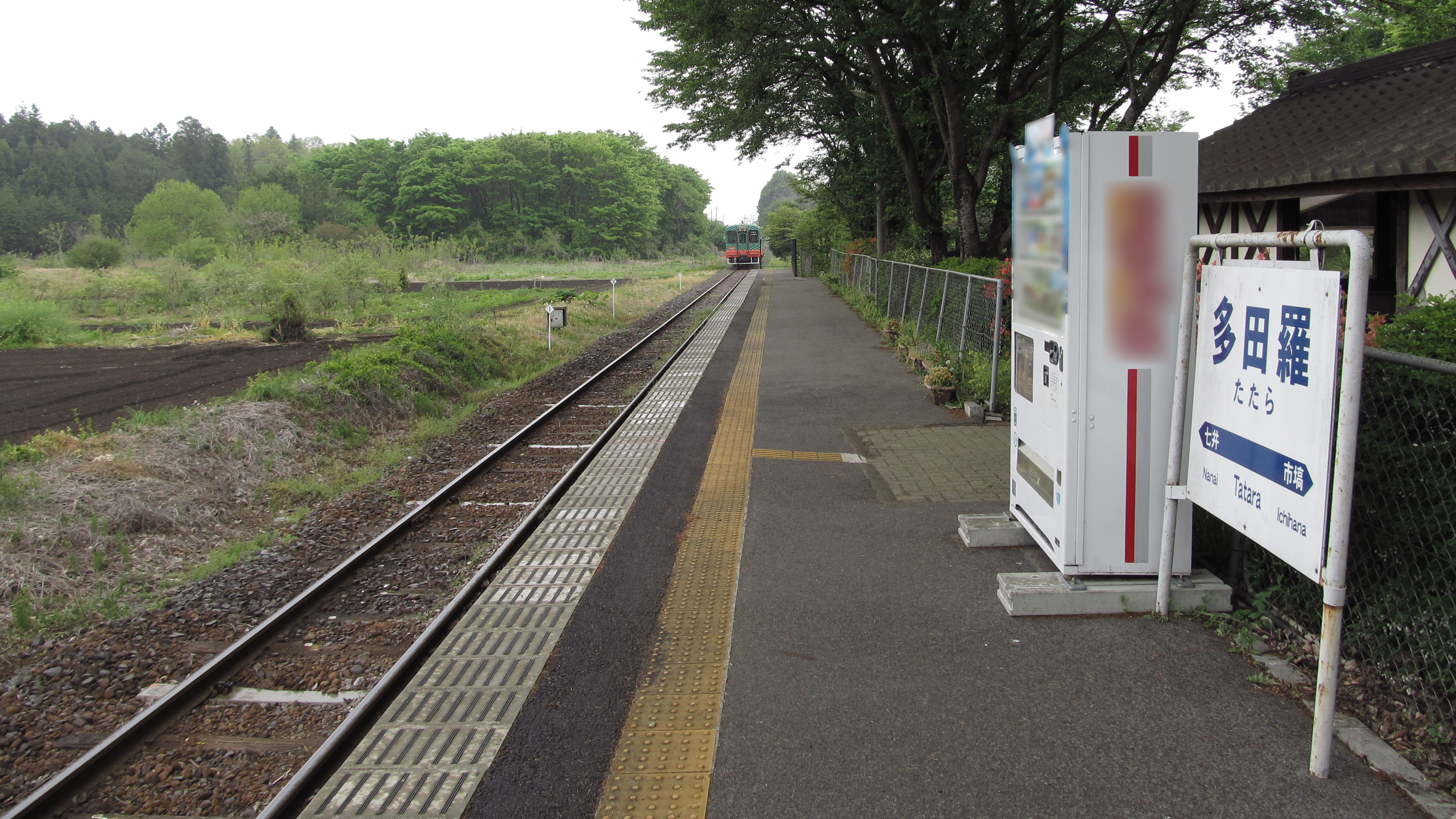
The station platforms as of May 2014

== History ==
Tatara Station opened on 1 April 1955. The station was absorbed into the JR East network upon the privatization of the JNR on 1 April 1987, and the Mooka Railway from 11 April 1988.

== Surrounding area ==
- Taiheiyo Country Club
