= Kugeta Station =

Railway station in Mooka, Tochigi Prefecture, Japan

Coordinates: 36.3762°N 139.9717°E

Kugeta Station 久下田駅
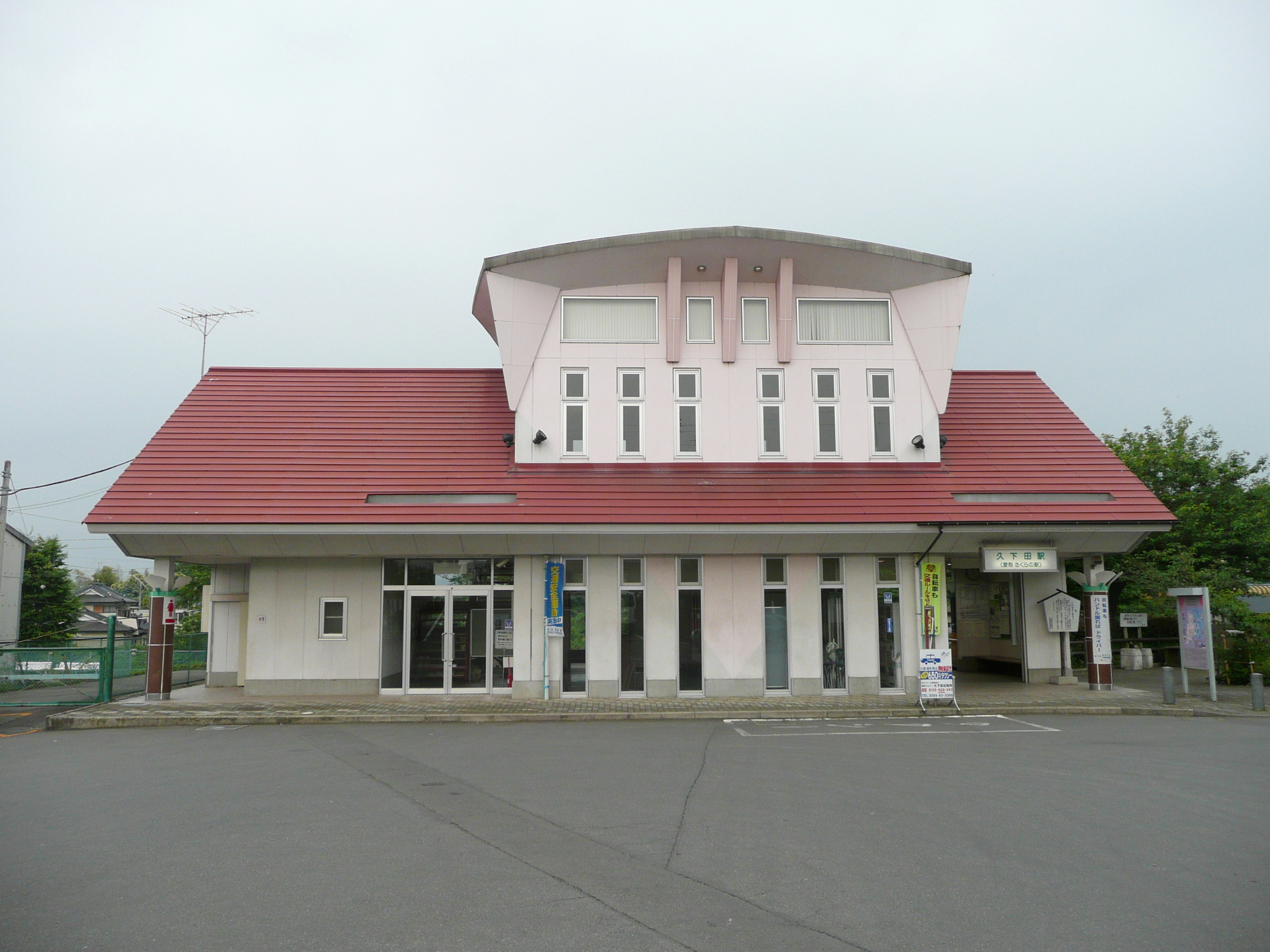
- Kugeta Station (June 2008)

General information
- Location: Kugeta 800-4, Mooka, Tochigi （栃木県真岡市久下田800-4） Japan
- Operator: Mooka Railway
- Line: Mooka Line
- Platforms: 2 (2 side platforms)

History
- Opened: 1912

Passengers
- FY 2012: 121 daily

Services
| Preceding station | Mooka Railway | Following station |
|---|---|---|
| Orimoto towards Shimodate | SL Mooka | Terauchi towards Motegi |
| Higuchi towards Shimodate | Mooka Line | Terauchi towards Motegi |
Location

Kugeta Station (久下田駅, Kugeta-eki) is a railway station in Mooka, Tochigi Prefecture, Japan, operated by the Mooka Railway.

== Lines ==
Kugeta Station is a station on the Mooka Line, and is located 8.5 rail kilometers from the terminus of the line at Shimodate Station.

== Station layout ==
Kugeta Station has two side platforms.

== History ==
Kugeta Station opened on 1 April 1912 as a station on the Japanese Government Railway, which subsequently became the Japanese National Railways (JNR). The station was absorbed into the JR East network upon the privatization of the JNR on 1 April 1987, and the Mooka Railway from 11 April 1988.

== Surrounding area ==
- Japan National Route 294
- Former Kugeta Town Hall
- Kugeta Post Office
