= Higuchi Station =

Higuchi Station can refer to two different train stations in Japan:

- Higuchi Station (Saitama) (樋口駅), on the Chichibu Main Line located in Nagatoro, Saitama, Japan
- Higuchi Station (Ibaraki) (ひぐち駅), on the Mooka Line located in Chikusei, Ibaraki, Japan
