= Ichihana Station =

Railway station in Ichikai, Tochigi Prefecture, Japan

Ichihana Station 市塙駅
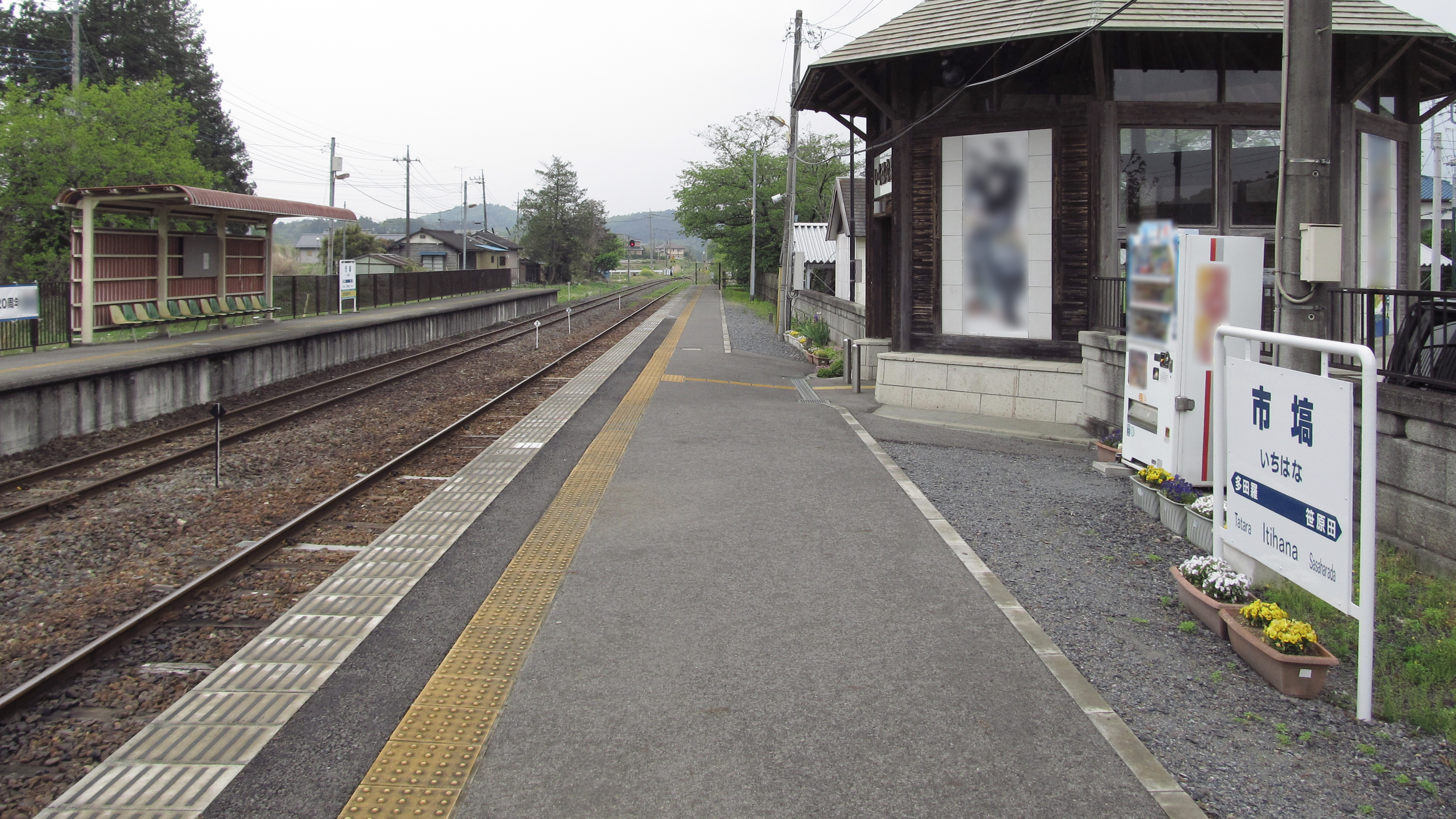
- Ichihana Station (May 2014)

General information
- Location: Ichihana 2068-2, Ichikai, Haga, Tochigi （栃木県芳賀郡市貝町大字市塙2068-2） Japan
- Coordinates: 36.5380°N 140.1101°E
- Operator: Mooka Railway
- Line: Mooka Line
- Platforms: 2 (2 side platforms)

History
- Opened: December 15, 1920

Passengers
- FY 2015: 88 daily

Services
Preceding station	Mooka Railway	Following station
Tatara towards Shimodate	SL Mooka	Motegi Terminus
Tatara towards Shimodate	Mooka Line	Sasaharada towards Motegi
Location

Ichihana Station (市塙駅, Ichihana-eki) is a railway station in Ichikai, Tochigi Prefecture, Japan, operated by the Mooka Railway.

== Lines ==
Ichihana Station is a station on the Mooka Line, and is located 34.3 rail kilometers from the terminus of the line at Shimodate Station.

== Station layout ==
Ichihana Station has two opposed side platforms connected to the station building by a level crossing. The station is unattended.

== History ==
Ichihana Station opened on 15 December 1920 as a station on the Japanese Government Railway, which subsequently became the Japanese National Railways (JNR). The station was absorbed into the JR East network upon the privatization of the JNR on 1 April 1987, and the Mooka Railway from 11 April 1988.

== Surrounding area ==
- Ichikai Town Hall
- Ichikai Post Office
- Ichikai Elementary School
- Ichikai Middle School
