= Higuchi Station (Ibaraki) =

Railway station in Chikusei, Ibaraki Prefecture, Japan

Higuchi Station ひぐち駅
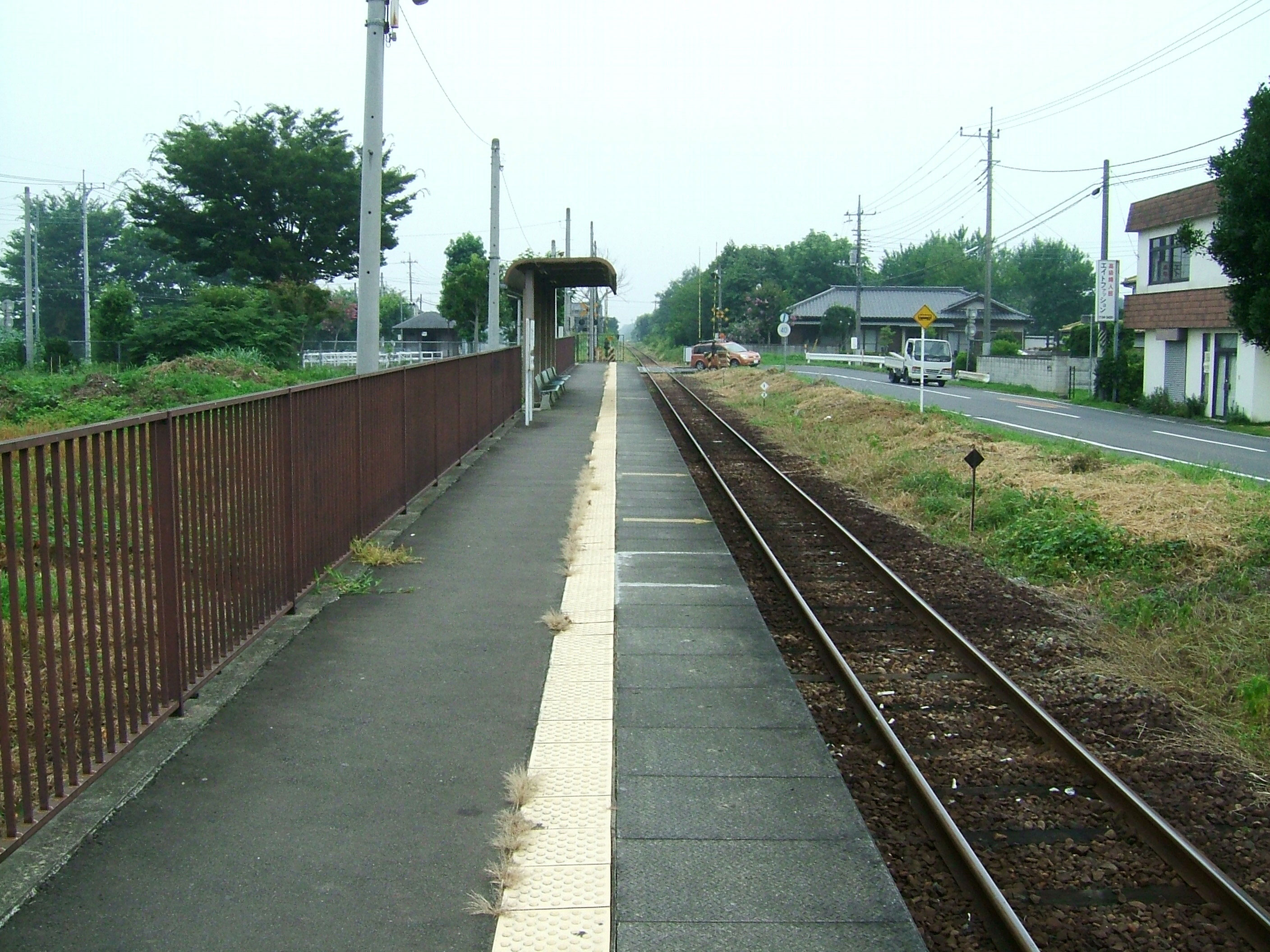
- Higuchi Station platform (August 2008)

General information
- Location: Orimoto 747-3, Chikusei-shi, Ibaraki-ken 308-0007; Japan
- Coordinates: 36.3577°N 139.9701°E
- Operator: Mooka Railway
- Line: ■ Mooka Line
- Distance: 6.6 km from Shimodate
- Platforms: 1 (1 side platform)
- Tracks: 1

Other information
- Status: Unstaffed
- Website: Official website

History
- Opened: 14 March 1992

Passengers
- FY2018: 28 daily

Services
Preceding station	Mooka Railway	Following station
Orimoto towards Shimodate	Mooka Line	Kugeta towards Motegi
Location
- Location within Ibaraki Prefecture Location within Japan

Higuchi Station (ひぐち駅, Higuchi-eki) is a passenger train station in the city of Chikusei, Ibaraki, Japan, operated by the third sector railway company Mooka Railway.

== Lines ==
Higuchi Station is a station on the Mooka Line, and is located 6.6 rail kilometers from the terminus of the line at Shimodate Station.

== Station layout ==
The station consists of a single side platform serving traffic in both directions. The station is unattended.

== History ==
Higuchi Station opened on 14 March 1992.

== Passenger statistics ==
In fiscal 2018, the station was used by an average of 28 passengers daily (boarding passengers only).

== Surrounding area ==
- National Route 294
- National Route 408

== See also ==
- List of railway stations in Japan
