= Ninomiya, Tochigi =

Dissolved municipality in Tochigi prefecture, Japan

Coordinates: 36°23′N 139°58′E

Location of Ninomiya in Tochigi Prefecture

Ninomiya (二宮町, Ninomiya-machi) was a town located in Haga District, lying in the extreme south-east of Tochigi Prefecture, Japan.

As of 2006, the town had an estimated population of 16,765 and a density of 300.52 persons per km^{2}. The total area is 55.45 km^{2}, spanning 14 km east–west and 9 km north–south at its widest points.

On March 23, 2009, Ninomiya was merged into the expanded city of Mo'oka.

Ninomiya commonly means "the second shrine" of the province, but this town is named after an 18th-century hero, Ninomiya Sontoku. There is a museum dedicated to the town's namesake in the area of Ninomiya known as Monobe.

The town of Ninomiya was formed in 1955 when the town of Kugeta (久下田) and the two villages of Monobe (物部) and Naganuma (長沼) merged to form a single administrative area. The train station (serving the Mooka Line) still bears the name of Kugeta. A popular tourist attraction is the local steam train which stops at Kugeta on its route to and from Shimodate (下館) and Motegi (茂木).

Ninomiya was the largest producer of strawberries in Japan, and many of the town's inhabitants are involved in the cultivation of this fruit.
