= Mooka Line =

Railway line in Ibaraki & Tochigi Prefectures, Japan

Mooka Line 真岡線
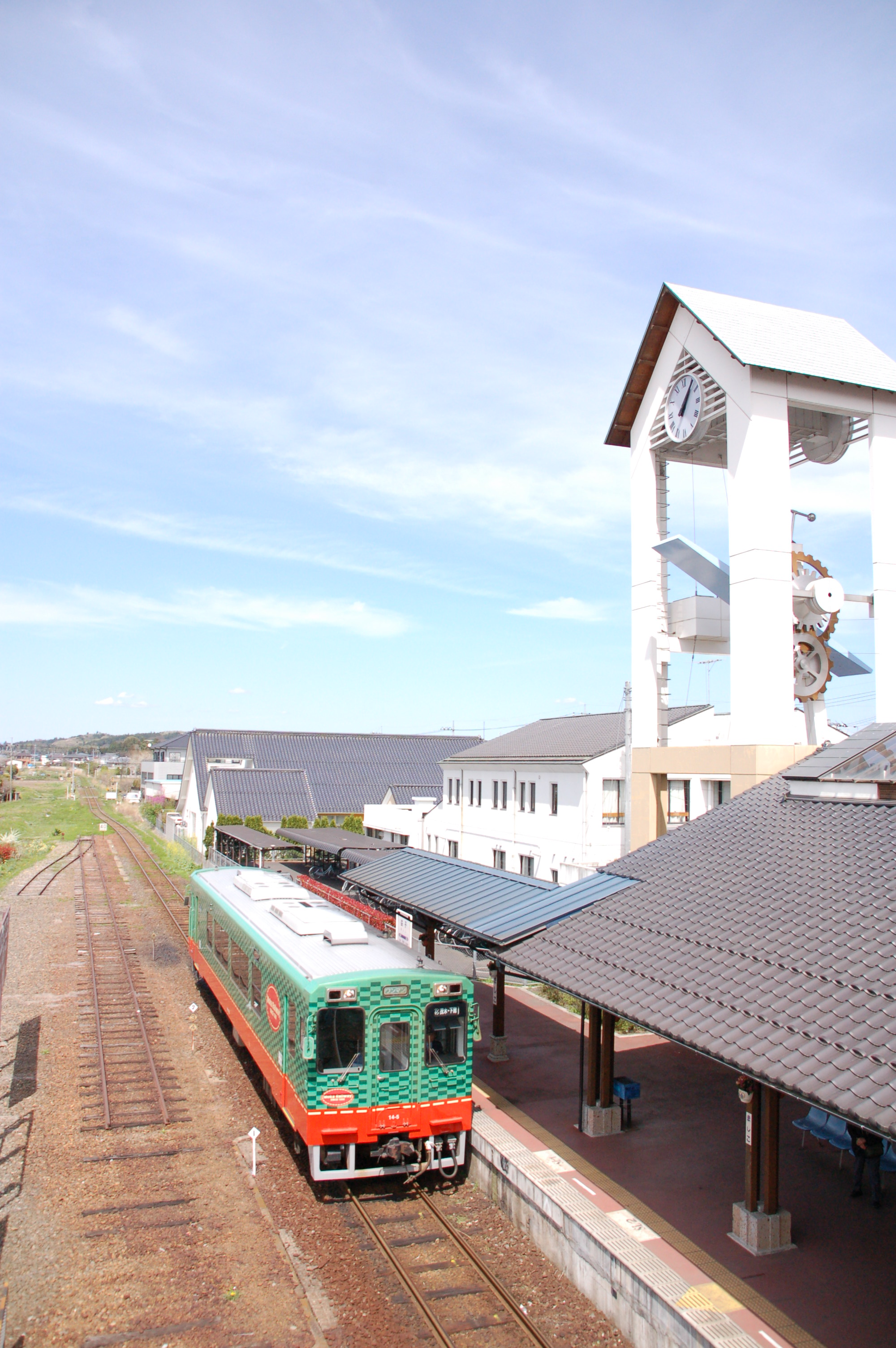
- Moka 14 DMU at Mashiko Station, April 2006

Overview
- Owner: Moka Railway
- Locale: Ibaraki, Tochigi prefectures
- Termini: Shimodate; Motegi
- Stations: 17
- Website: https://www.moka-railway.co.jp/

Service
- Type: Heavy rail

History
- Opened: 1912

Technical
- Line length: 41.9 km (26.04 mi)
- Track gauge: 3 ft 6 in (1,067 mm)
- Electrification: None

The Mooka Line (真岡線, Mo-oka-sen) is a Japanese railway line connecting Shimodate Station, in Chikusei, Ibaraki and Motegi Station in Motegi, Tochigi. It is the only railway line operated by the Moka Railway (真岡鐵道, Moka Tetsudō). The third-sector company took over the former JR East line in 1988. In addition to regular diesel local trains, the line also operates the SL Moka steam service for tourists using a C12 class steam locomotive.

The railway and its operating company are also spelled Mooka Line and Moka Railway, respectively.

== History ==
- 1 April 1912: 16.5 km Moka Light Railway (真岡軽便線) line opens between Shimodate and Moka.
- 15 December 1920: Entire line opened to Motegi (route length of 42.0 km). The proposed extension to Nagakura was not constructed.
- 2 September 1922: Line renamed Moka Line.
- 1 November 1982: Freight services discontinued.
- 11 September 1984: Line closure approved.
- 11 April 1988: JR line closes and becomes Moka Railway Moka Line. Route length is reduced to 41.9 km.
- 27 March 1994: SL Moka steam train operation starts.
- 30 July 2020: JNR Class C11 steam locomotive #325 moved to Tobu Railway.

== Rolling stock ==
(As of October 2022)

- Moka 14 diesel railcars x9
- DE10 Class diesel locomotive #1535
- JNR Class C12 steam locomotive #66
- OHa & OHaFu coaches x3

== Stations ==
- The SL Moka stops at stations marked with "●" and passes stations marked "｜".
- To take the SL Moka, passengers must purchase the SL ticket (500 yen) via Moka Railways SL Guide and reserve their seats at least a day in advance.
- There is "SL・DL Rapid" service only on days SL Moka is operated. And, boarding on this service costs only fares.

Station	Japanese	Distance (km)	SL Moka	SL・DL Rapid	Transfers	Location	
Shimodate	下館	0.0	●	●	East Japan Railway Company (JR East): ■ Mito Line; Kantō Railway: ■ Jōsō Line	Chikusei	Ibaraki
Shimodate-Nikōmae	下館二高前	2.2	｜	↓		Chikusei	Ibaraki
Orimoto	折本	4.6	●	●		Chikusei	Ibaraki
Higuchi	ひぐち	6.5	｜	↓		Chikusei	Ibaraki
Kugeta	久下田	8.5	●	●		Moka	Tochigi
Terauchi	寺内	12.6	●	↓		Moka	Tochigi
Moka	真岡	16.4	●	●		Moka	Tochigi
Kitamōka	北真岡	18.0	｜			Moka	Tochigi
Nishidai	西田井	21.2	●			Moka	Tochigi
Kitayama	北山	22.9	｜			Moka	Tochigi
Mashiko	益子	25.1	●			Mashiko, Haga District	Tochigi
Nanai	七井	28.4	●			Mashiko, Haga District	Tochigi
Tatara	多田羅	31.2	●			Ichikai, Haga District	Tochigi
Ichihana	市塙	34.3	●			Ichikai, Haga District	Tochigi
Sasaharada	笹原田	38.1	｜			Ichikai, Haga District	Tochigi
Ten'yaba	天矢場	39.2	｜			Motegi, Haga District	Tochigi
Motegi	茂木	41.9	●			Motegi, Haga District	Tochigi

== See also ==
- List of railway companies in Japan
- List of railway lines in Japan
