= Ichikai =

Ichikai 市貝町
- Town
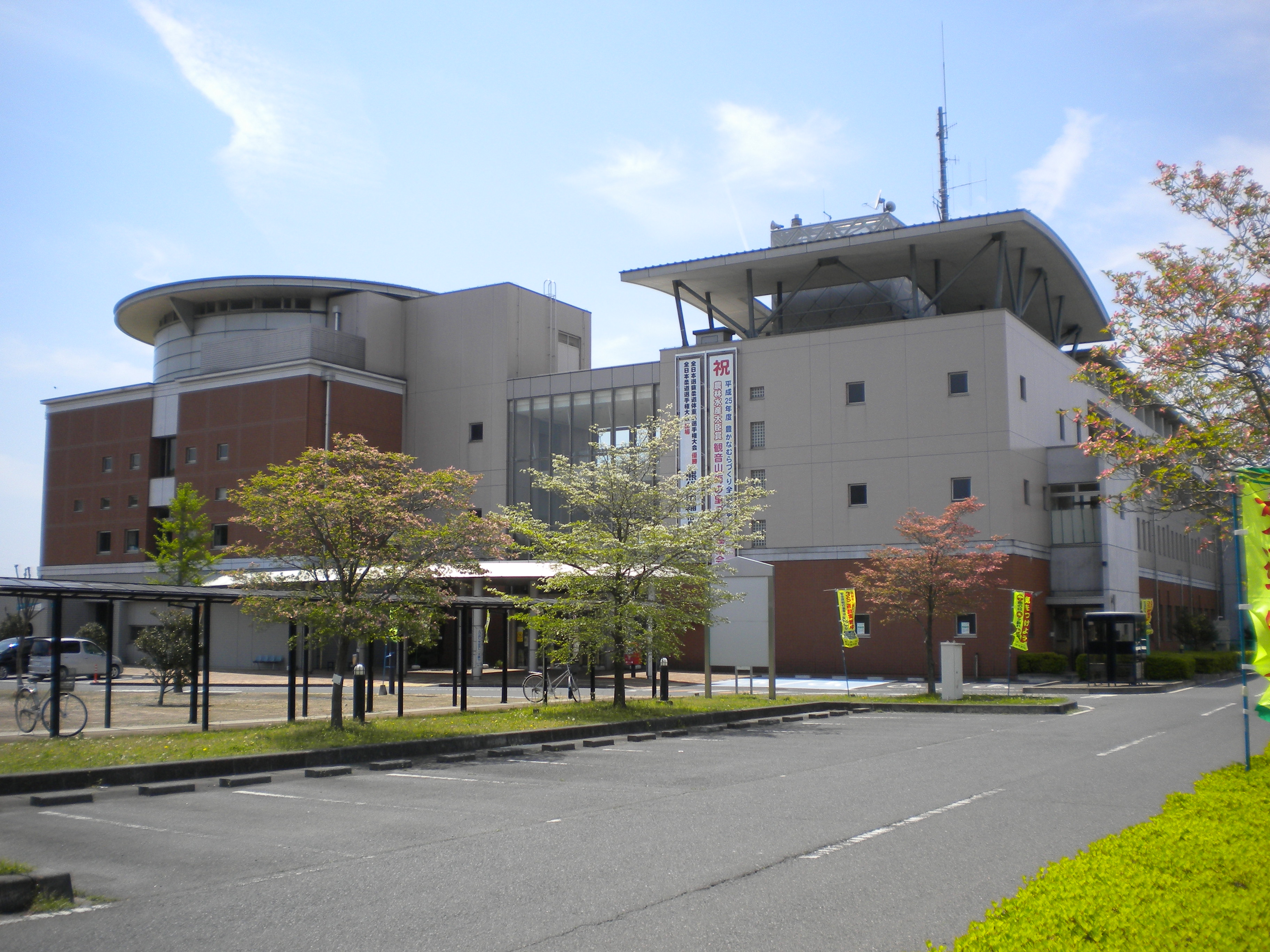
- Ichikai Town Office

- Flag Seal

- Location of Ichikai in Tochigi Prefecture

- Coordinates: 36°33′N 140°06′E
- Country: Japan
- Region: Kantō
- Prefecture: Tochigi
- District: Haga

Area
  - Total: 64.25 km^{2} (24.81 sq mi)

Population (August 2020)
  - Total: 11,684
  - Density: 181.9/km^{2} (471.0/sq mi)
- Time zone: UTC+9 (Japan Standard Time)
- Tree: Cryptomeria
- Flower: Chrysanthemum
- Bird: Oriental turtle dove
- Phone number: 0285-68-1111
- Address: Ichikai 1280, Ichikai-machi, Haga-gun, Tochigi-ken 321-3493
- Website: Official website

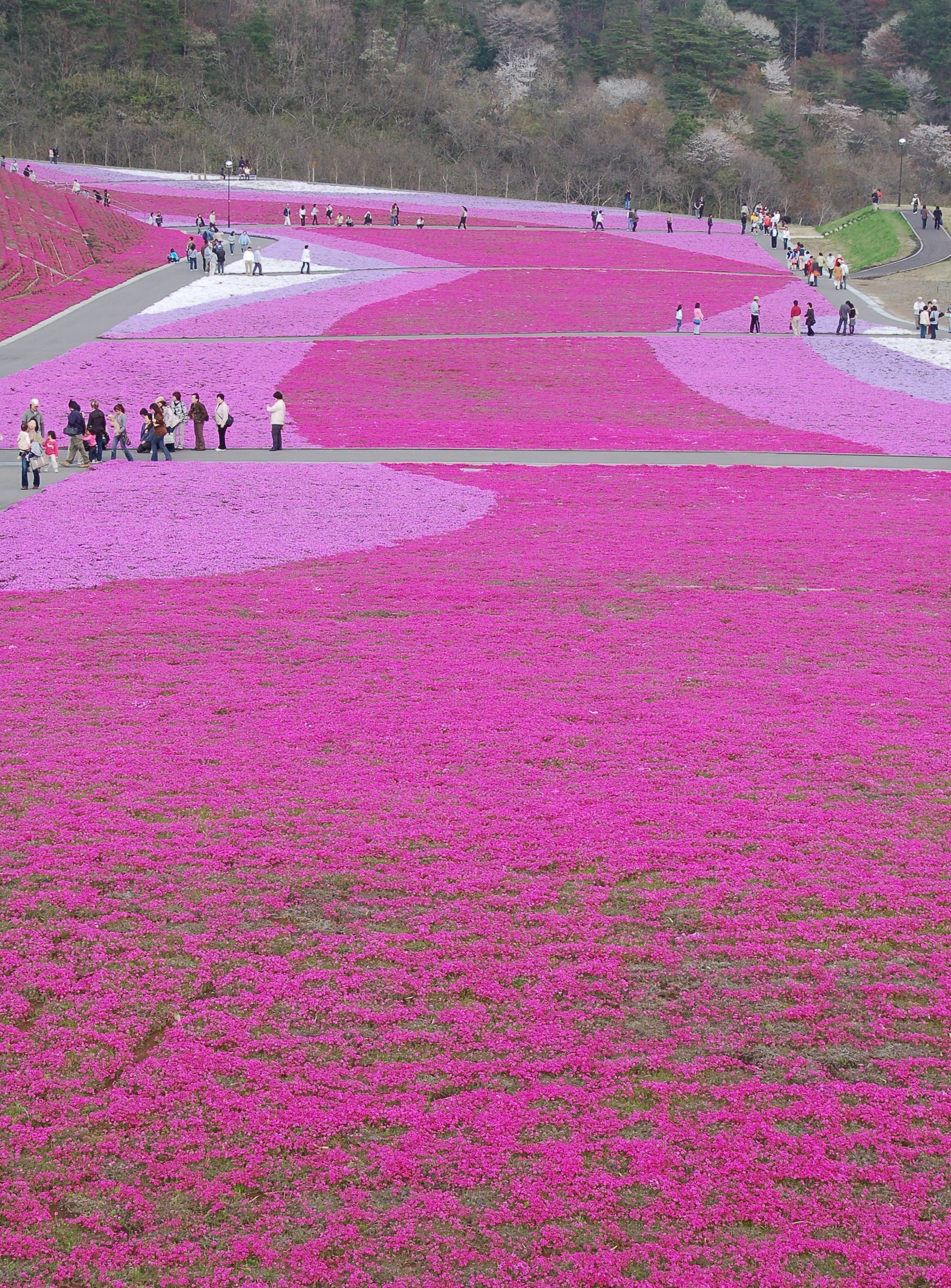
Shibazakura Park in Ichikai

Ichikai (市貝町, Ichikai-machi) is a town located in Tochigi Prefecture, Japan. As of 1 August 2020, the town had an estimated population of 11,684 in 4507 households, and a population density of 180 persons per km^{2}. The total area of the town is 64.25 square kilometres (24.81 sq mi).

== Geography ==
Ichikai is located in eastern Tochigi Prefecture.

== Surrounding municipalities ==
Tochigi Prefecture

- Haga
- Mashiko
- Mooka
- Motegi
- Nasukarasuyama
- Takanezawa

== Demographics ==
Per Japanese census data, the population of Ichikai has remained relatively steady over the past 30 years.

Historical population
Year	Pop.	±%
1920	10,108	—
1930	10,865	+7.5%
1940	11,242	+3.5%
1950	14,154	+25.9%
1960	12,173	−14.0%
1970	10,249	−15.8%
1980	10,459	+2.0%
1990	11,481	+9.8%
2000	12,441	+8.4%
2010	12,090	−2.8%
2020	11,262	−6.8%

== History ==
Ichihane and Kokai villages were created within Haga District on April 1, 1889, with the creation of the modern municipalities system. The two villages merged to form Ichikai village on May 3, 1954. Ichikai was elevated to town status on January 1, 1972.

== Government ==
Ichikai has a mayor-council form of government with a directly elected mayor and a unicameral town council of 12 members. Ichikai, together with the other municipalities in Haga District collectively contributes two members to the Tochigi Prefectural Assembly. In terms of national politics, the town is part of Tochigi 4th district of the lower house of the Diet of Japan.

== Economy ==
The economy of Ichikai is heavily dependent on agriculture. It is also a bedroom community for nearby Utsunomiya, Mooka and Haga.

== Education ==
Ichikai has three public primary schools and one public middle school operated by the town government. The town does not have a high school.

== Transportation ==
=== Railway ===
- Moka Railway – Mooka Line
  - Tatara - Ichihana - Sasaharada

=== Highway ===
- National Route 123
