= Mooka =

Mooka 真岡市
- City
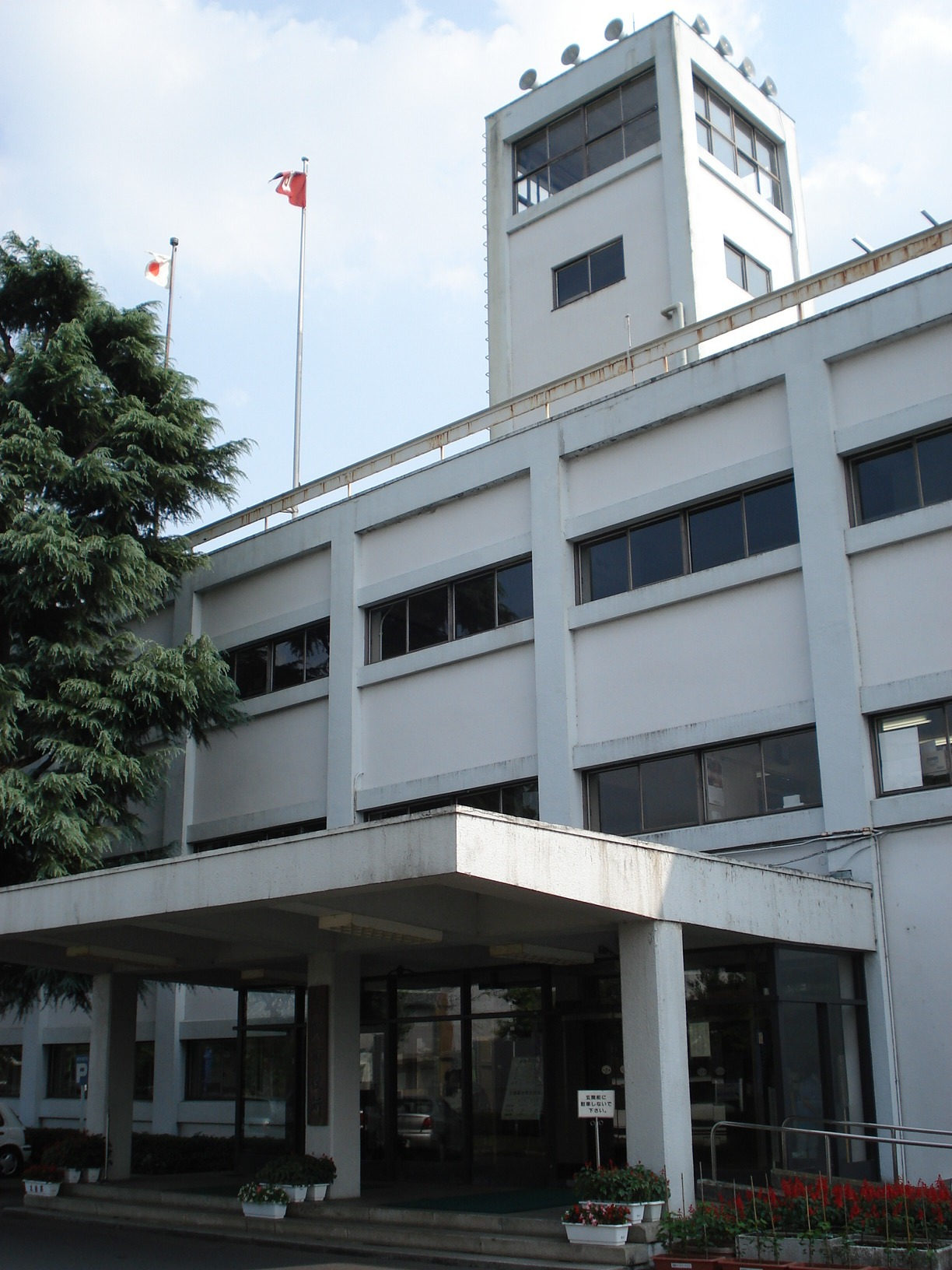
- Mooka City Hall

- Flag Seal

- Location of Mooka in Tochigi Prefecture

- Coordinates: 36°26′25.5″N 140°0′48.2″E
- Country: Japan
- Region: Kantō
- Prefecture: Tochigi

Government
  - Mayor: Kazuhiko Nakamura (since May 2025)

Area
  - Total: 167.34 km^{2} (64.61 sq mi)

Population (August 2020)
  - Total: 78,720
  - Density: 470.4/km^{2} (1,218/sq mi)
- Time zone: UTC+9 (Japan Standard Time)
- Phone number: 285-82-1111
- Address: 5191 Aramachi, Mooka-shi, Tochigi-ken 321-4395
- Climate: Cfa
- Website: Official website
- Symbols
- Bird: Eurasian skylark
- Flower: Gossypium
- Tree: Zelkova serrata

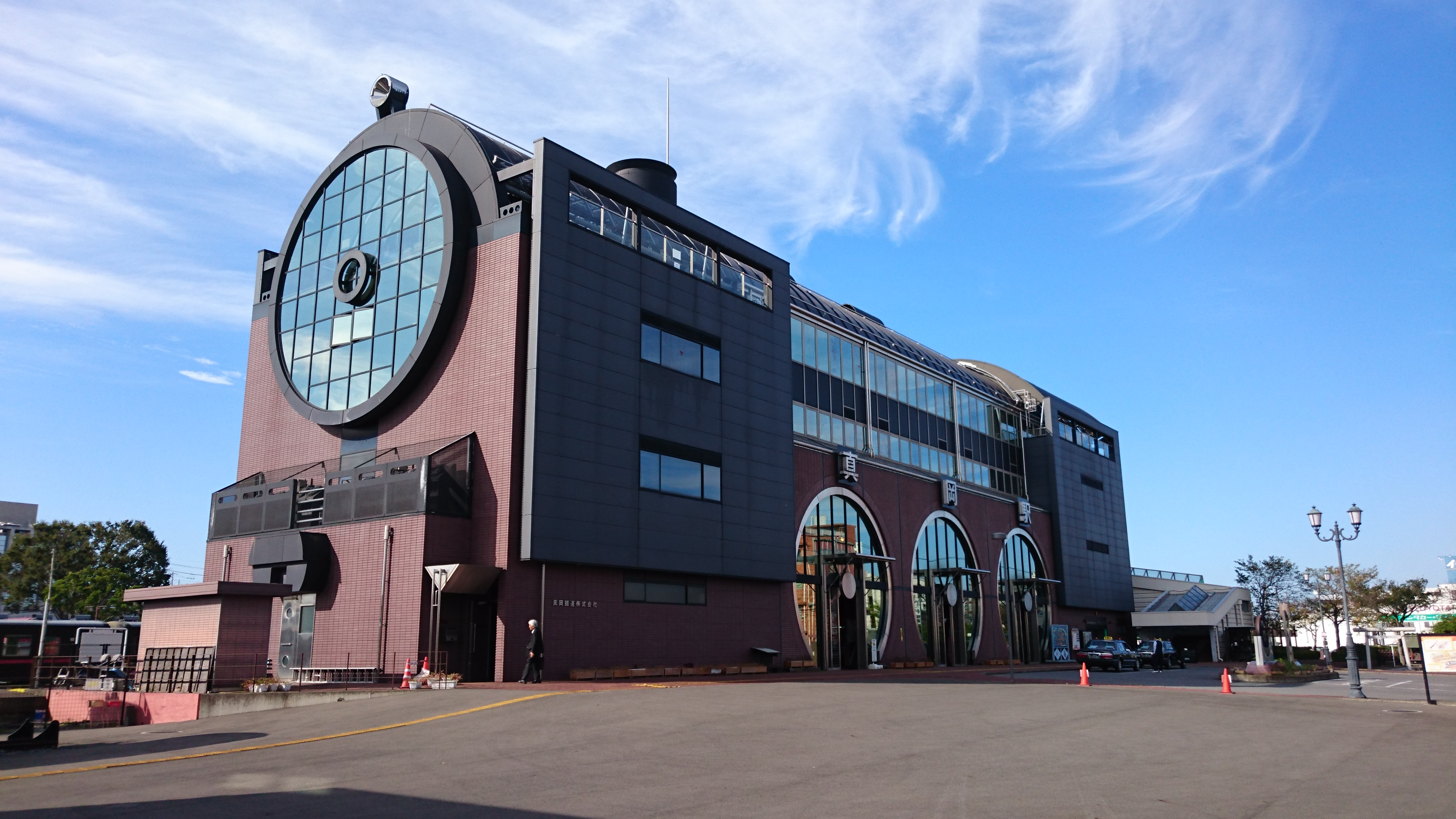
Mooka Station

Mooka (真岡市, Mooka-shi) is a city located in Tochigi Prefecture, Japan. As of 1 August 2020, the city had an estimated population of 78,720 in 30,203 households, and a population density of 476 persons per km^{2}. The total area of the city is 167.34 square kilometres (64.61 sq mi). Mooka is known for the Mooka Railway, which operates steam locomotives. The train line stretches from Shimodate, Ibaraki Prefecture to Motegi, Tochigi Prefecture. The town produces 7,000 tons of strawberries annually. The name of the city is given as "Moka City" per the city's official website; however, the local train station is "Mōka Station", and the direct transliteration of the city name into Hepburn romanization is "Mooka".

== Geography ==
Mooka is located in southeast Tochigi Prefecture. It is located approximately 100 kilometer from Tokyo metropolis and 15 kilometers from the prefectural capital of Utsunomiya

=== Surrounding municipalities ===
Ibaraki Prefecture

- Chikusei
- Sakuragawa

Tochigi Prefecture

- Haga
- Ichikai
- Kaminokawa
- Mashiko
- Oyama
- Shimotsuke
- Utsunomiya

=== Climate ===
Mooka has a humid subtropical climate (Köppen Cfa) characterized by warm summers and cold winters with heavy snowfall. The average annual temperature in Mooka is 13.5 °C (56.3 °F). The average annual rainfall is 1,306.2 mm (51.43 in) with September as the wettest month. The temperatures are highest on average in August, at around 25.5 °C (77.9 °F), and lowest in January, at around 1.6 °C (34.9 °F).

Climate data for Mooka (1991−2020 normals, extremes 1978−present)
Month	Jan	Feb	Mar	Apr	May	Jun	Jul	Aug	Sep	Oct	Nov	Dec	Year
Record high °C (°F)	17.7 (63.9)	22.9 (73.2)	25.6 (78.1)	30.2 (86.4)	34.5 (94.1)	37.3 (99.1)	38.2 (100.8)	38.6 (101.5)	36.1 (97.0)	33.6 (92.5)	24.4 (75.9)	24.2 (75.6)	38.6 (101.5)
Mean daily maximum °C (°F)	8.5 (47.3)	9.6 (49.3)	13.1 (55.6)	18.5 (65.3)	23.0 (73.4)	25.7 (78.3)	29.4 (84.9)	30.9 (87.6)	27.0 (80.6)	21.4 (70.5)	15.9 (60.6)	10.8 (51.4)	19.5 (67.1)
Daily mean °C (°F)	1.6 (34.9)	2.8 (37.0)	6.6 (43.9)	11.9 (53.4)	17.2 (63.0)	20.7 (69.3)	24.4 (75.9)	25.5 (77.9)	21.8 (71.2)	15.9 (60.6)	9.5 (49.1)	3.9 (39.0)	13.5 (56.3)
Mean daily minimum °C (°F)	−4.8 (23.4)	−3.6 (25.5)	0.1 (32.2)	5.5 (41.9)	11.8 (53.2)	16.6 (61.9)	20.7 (69.3)	21.6 (70.9)	17.8 (64.0)	11.1 (52.0)	3.6 (38.5)	−2.3 (27.9)	8.2 (46.7)
Record low °C (°F)	−13.7 (7.3)	−12.9 (8.8)	−9.0 (15.8)	−5.2 (22.6)	0.4 (32.7)	6.9 (44.4)	11.9 (53.4)	12.5 (54.5)	5.1 (41.2)	−1.0 (30.2)	−5.9 (21.4)	−10.6 (12.9)	−13.7 (7.3)
Average precipitation mm (inches)	34.7 (1.37)	37.3 (1.47)	80.4 (3.17)	109.8 (4.32)	134.2 (5.28)	147.1 (5.79)	182.9 (7.20)	141.2 (5.56)	184.0 (7.24)	152.1 (5.99)	67.1 (2.64)	39.4 (1.55)	1,306.2 (51.43)
Average precipitation days (≥ 1.0 mm)	4.0	4.8	8.8	10.2	11.2	13.4	13.1	10.7	11.8	9.9	6.6	4.7	109.2
Mean monthly sunshine hours	205.3	194.3	192.4	182.9	187.1	132.4	144.9	169.2	131.5	143.7	165.0	192.0	2,044
Source: Japan Meteorological Agency

=== Demographics ===
Per Japanese census data, the population of Mooka has recently plateaued after a long period of growth.

Historical population
Year	Pop.	±%
1920	40,755	—
1930	45,338	+11.2%
1940	47,533	+4.8%
1950	61,184	+28.7%
1960	58,213	−4.9%
1970	57,035	−2.0%
1980	69,967	+22.7%
1990	79,228	+13.2%
2000	81,530	+2.9%
2010	82,279	+0.9%
2020	78,190	−5.0%

== History ==
During the Edo Period, much of the area was tenryō territory under direct control of the Tokugawa Shogunate or various hatamoto. Towards the end of the Edo Period, the daimyō of Odawara, Ōkubo Tadazane attempted to develop waste land with the assistance of Ninomiya Sontoku. The town on Mooka was established within Tsuga District, Tochigi on April 1, 1889 with the creation of the modern municipalities system. Mooka annexed the neighboring villages of Yamazeki, Ouchi and Naka on March 31, 1954. It was elevated to city status on October 1, 1954.

On March 23, 2009, the town of Ninomiya (from Haga District) was merged into Mooka.

== Government ==
Mooka has a mayor-council form of government with a directly elected mayor and a unicameral city assembly of 21 members. Mooka collectively contributes two members to the Tochigi Prefectural Assembly. In terms of national politics, the city is part of Tochigi 4th district of the lower house of the Diet of Japan.

== Economy ==
Mooka is a regional commercial center with a mixed economy. Agriculture centers primarily on rice production and fruits. Traditional industries of sake brewing and cotton weaving have largely been replaced by light manufacturing of automotive and electronic components, primarily for the nearby Nissan factory in Kaminokawa and Honda factory in Tsuga.

== Education ==
Mooka has 14 public primary schools and nine public middle schools operated by the city government. and four high schools. The city has four public high schools operated by the Tochigi Prefectural Board of Education.

It previously hosted the Colégio Pitágoras Brasil, a Brazilian school.

== Transportation ==
=== Railway ===
- Mooka Railway Mooka Line
  - Kugeta - Terauchi - Mōka - Kitamōka - Nishidai - Kitayama

=== Highway ===
- Kita-Kantō Expressway – Mooka Interchange
- National Route 121
- National Route 292
- National Route 408

== Local attractions ==
- Osaki Jinja
- Site of Nakamura Castle

== International relations ==
- Douliu, Taiwan
- Glendora, California, United States

== Noted people ==
- Takanori Hoshino, voice actor
- Nándor Wagner, artist and sculptor
