= Chikusei =

Chikusei 筑西市
- City
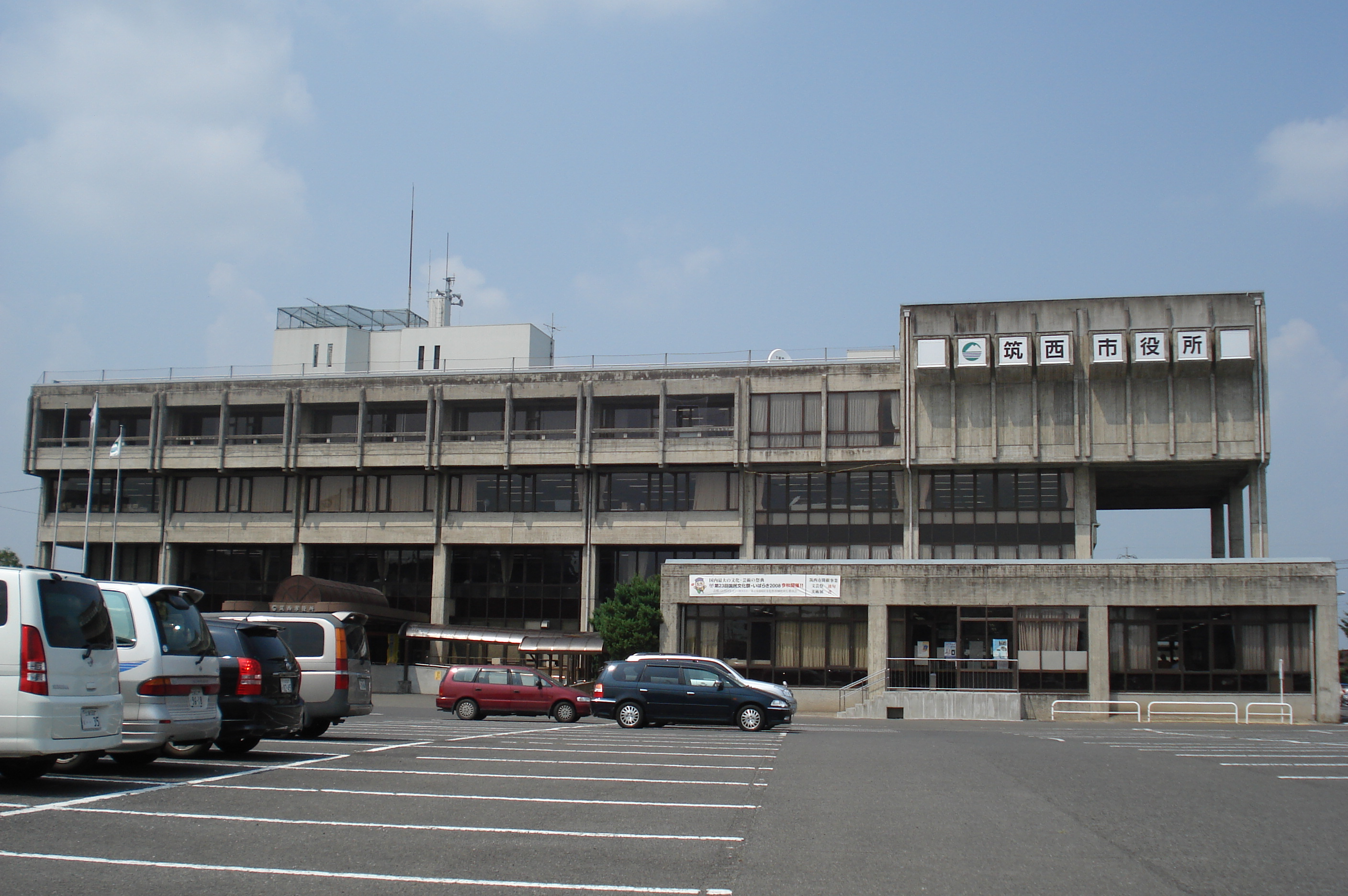
- Chikusei city hall

- Flag Seal

- Location of Chikusei in Ibaraki Prefecture

- Coordinates: 36°18′25.5″N 139°58′59.3″E
- Country: Japan
- Region: Kantō
- Prefecture: Ibaraki

Area
  - Total: 205.30 km^{2} (79.27 sq mi)

Population (January 2024)
  - Total: 98,031
  - Density: 477.50/km^{2} (1,236.7/sq mi)
- Time zone: UTC+9 (Japan Standard Time)
- Phone number: 0296-24-2111
- Address: 732-1 Shimonakayama, Chikusei-shi, Ibaraki-ken 308-8616
- Climate: Cfa
- Website: Official website
- Symbols
- Bird: Barn swallow
- Flower: Japanese pear and cosmos
- Tree: Sakura

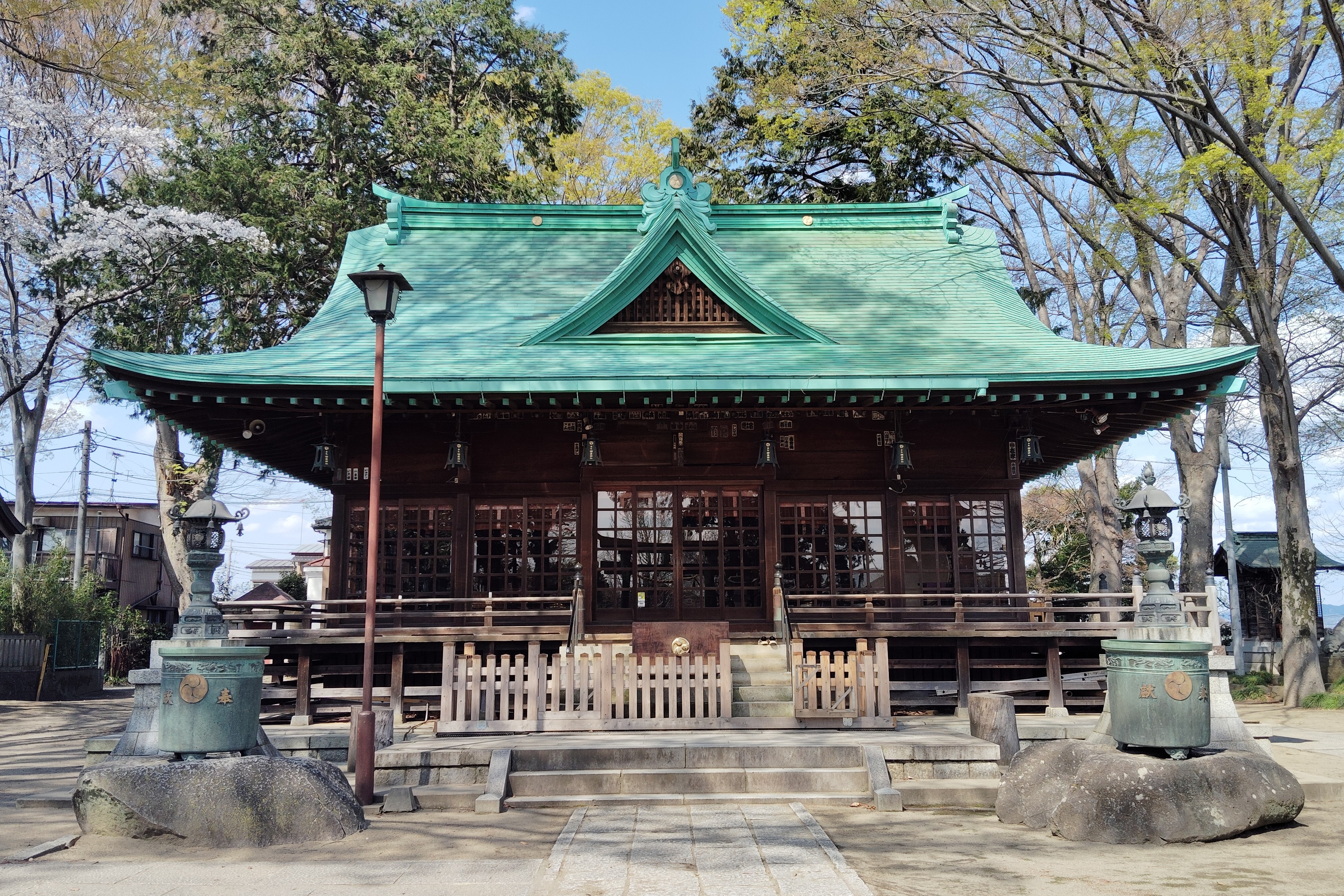
Shimodate Haguro Shrine

Chikusei (筑西市, Chikusei-shi) is a city located in Ibaraki Prefecture, Japan. As of 1 January 2024, the city had an estimated population of 98,031 in 39,075 households and a population density of 478 persons per km^{2}. The percentage of the population aged over 65 was 31.2%. The total area of the city is 205.30 square kilometres (79.27 sq mi).

== Geography ==
Located in southwestern Ibaraki Prefecture, Chikusei is located on the west side of Mount Tsukuba and is bordered by Tochigi Prefecture to the north. The Kinugawa River and the Kokaigawa River flow through the city. The city is located about 70 kilometers north of downtown Tokyo. Except for the hills with an altitude of about 200 meters connected to the Abukuma mountains at the northeastern end, almost the entire area is flat land with an elevation of about 20 to 60 meters or extremely gentle hills, and about 95% of the total area of the city is residential or cultivated. rice paddies occupy about 40% of the total area of the city.

=== Surrounding municipalities ===
Ibaraki Prefecture

- Sakuragawa
- Shimotsuma
- Tsukuba
- Yashiyo
- Yūki

Tochigi Prefecture

- Mooka
- Oyama

=== Climate ===
Chikusei has a humid subtropical climate (Köppen Cfa) characterized by warm summers and cool winters with light snowfall. The average annual temperature in Chikusei is 14.3 °C (57.7 °F). The average annual rainfall is 1,208.3 mm (47.57 in) with October as the wettest month. The temperatures are highest on average in August, at around 26.1 °C (79.0 °F), and lowest in January, at around 2.6 °C (36.7 °F).

Climate data for Shimodate, Chikusei (2002−2020 normals, extremes 2001−present)
Month	Jan	Feb	Mar	Apr	May	Jun	Jul	Aug	Sep	Oct	Nov	Dec	Year
Record high °C (°F)	18.8 (65.8)	23.7 (74.7)	26.3 (79.3)	30.2 (86.4)	33.6 (92.5)	34.6 (94.3)	37.2 (99.0)	39.0 (102.2)	37.8 (100.0)	32.4 (90.3)	24.7 (76.5)	24.4 (75.9)	39.0 (102.2)
Mean daily maximum °C (°F)	9.1 (48.4)	10.1 (50.2)	13.8 (56.8)	18.9 (66.0)	23.4 (74.1)	26.2 (79.2)	29.6 (85.3)	31.4 (88.5)	27.5 (81.5)	21.7 (71.1)	16.2 (61.2)	11.1 (52.0)	19.9 (67.9)
Daily mean °C (°F)	2.6 (36.7)	4.0 (39.2)	7.6 (45.7)	12.6 (54.7)	17.9 (64.2)	21.3 (70.3)	24.8 (76.6)	26.1 (79.0)	22.4 (72.3)	16.6 (61.9)	10.5 (50.9)	4.9 (40.8)	14.3 (57.7)
Mean daily minimum °C (°F)	−3.2 (26.2)	−1.8 (28.8)	1.6 (34.9)	6.8 (44.2)	13.1 (55.6)	17.4 (63.3)	21.3 (70.3)	22.3 (72.1)	18.6 (65.5)	12.3 (54.1)	5.2 (41.4)	−0.5 (31.1)	9.4 (49.0)
Record low °C (°F)	−11.0 (12.2)	−10.0 (14.0)	−6.7 (19.9)	−3.1 (26.4)	2.6 (36.7)	9.7 (49.5)	15.3 (59.5)	14.5 (58.1)	7.9 (46.2)	1.4 (34.5)	−3.1 (26.4)	−8.5 (16.7)	−11.0 (12.2)
Average precipitation mm (inches)	40.2 (1.58)	38.4 (1.51)	75.2 (2.96)	105.7 (4.16)	117.3 (4.62)	113.8 (4.48)	144.0 (5.67)	122.3 (4.81)	150.4 (5.92)	183.9 (7.24)	69.1 (2.72)	48.0 (1.89)	1,208.3 (47.57)
Average precipitation days (≥ 1.0 mm)	3.6	5.1	7.8	10.1	10.3	11.7	12.4	9.1	10.4	10.1	6.5	5.1	102.2
Mean monthly sunshine hours	211.5	180.4	193.0	185.5	187.3	140.7	141.0	184.7	138.9	140.1	157.1	182.3	2,042.6
Source: Japan Meteorological Agency

== Demographics ==
Per Japanese census data, the population of Chikusei peaked around 1990 and has steadily declined since.

Historical population
Year	Pop.	±%
1950	101,963	—
1960	97,894	−4.0%
1970	98,310	+0.4%
1980	110,846	+12.8%
1990	117,805	+6.3%
2000	116,120	−1.4%
2010	108,518	−6.5%
2020	100,753	−7.2%

== History ==
During the Edo period, parts of the modern city of Chikusei were administered by Shimodate Domain, one of the feudal domains of the Tokugawa shogunate. With the creation of the modern municipalities system after the Meiji Restoration on April 1, 1889, the town of Shimodate was established within Makabe District, Ibaraki). Shimodate was raised to city status on March 15, 1954.

The city of Chikusei was established on March 28, 2005, from the merger of the city of Shimodate, and towns of Akeno, Kyōwa and Sekijō (all from Makabe District).

== Government ==
Chikusei has a mayor-council form of government with a directly elected mayor and a unicameral city council of 24 members. Chikusei contributes two members to the Ibaraki Prefectural Assembly. In terms of national politics, the city is part of Ibaraki 1st district of the lower house of the Diet of Japan.

== Economy ==
Chikusei has traditionally had strong agricultural economy, with noted products including koshihikari rice, nashi pears, small watermelons, cucumbers, strawberries, and tomatoes. Taking advantage of the location near the Tokyo metropolitan area and with abundant wide flat land, multiple industrial parks were created from the 1980s, forming a part of the Kanto inland industrial area. It is also within commuting range for to the cities of southern Tochigi Prefecture.

== Education ==
Chikusei has 20 public elementary schools and seven public middle schools operated by the city government, and four public high schools operated by the Ibaraki Prefectural Board of Education. These is also one private middle school and one private high school.

== Transportation ==
=== Railway ===
JR East – Mito Line

- Kawashima - Tamado - Shimodate - Niihari

Kantō Railway – Jōsō Line

- Kurogo - Ōtagō - Shimodate

Mooka Railway

- Shimodate - Shimodate-Nikōmae - Orimoto - Higuchi

=== Highway ===
- Kita-Kantō Expressway (nearest interchange is Mooka IC in neighboring Mooka)]
- National Route 50
- National Route 294
- National Route 408

== Local attractions ==
- site of Seki Castle (national historic landmark)
- site of Isa Castle
- Funatama kofun
- site of Kogeta Castle
- site of Shimodate Castle
- Shimodate Gion Festival

== Noted people from Chikusei ==
- Norihiko Akagi, politician
- Hazan Itaya, ceramist
- Shingo Katayama, golfer
- Tomoki Nojiri, racing driver
- Yōko Teppōzuka, voice actress
