= Haga District =

District in Tochigi prefecture, Japan

Haga (芳賀郡, Haga-gun) is a district located in Tochigi Prefecture, Japan.

As of 2011, the district has an estimated population of 66,852 and a density of 169 persons per km^{2}. The total area is 396,72 km^{2}.

== Towns and villages ==
- Haga
- Ichikai
- Mashiko
- Motegi

== Merger ==
- On March 23, 2009, the town of Ninomiya was merged into the city of Mōka.
