= Motegi Station =

Railway station in Motegi, Tochigi Prefecture, Japan

Motegi Station 茂木駅
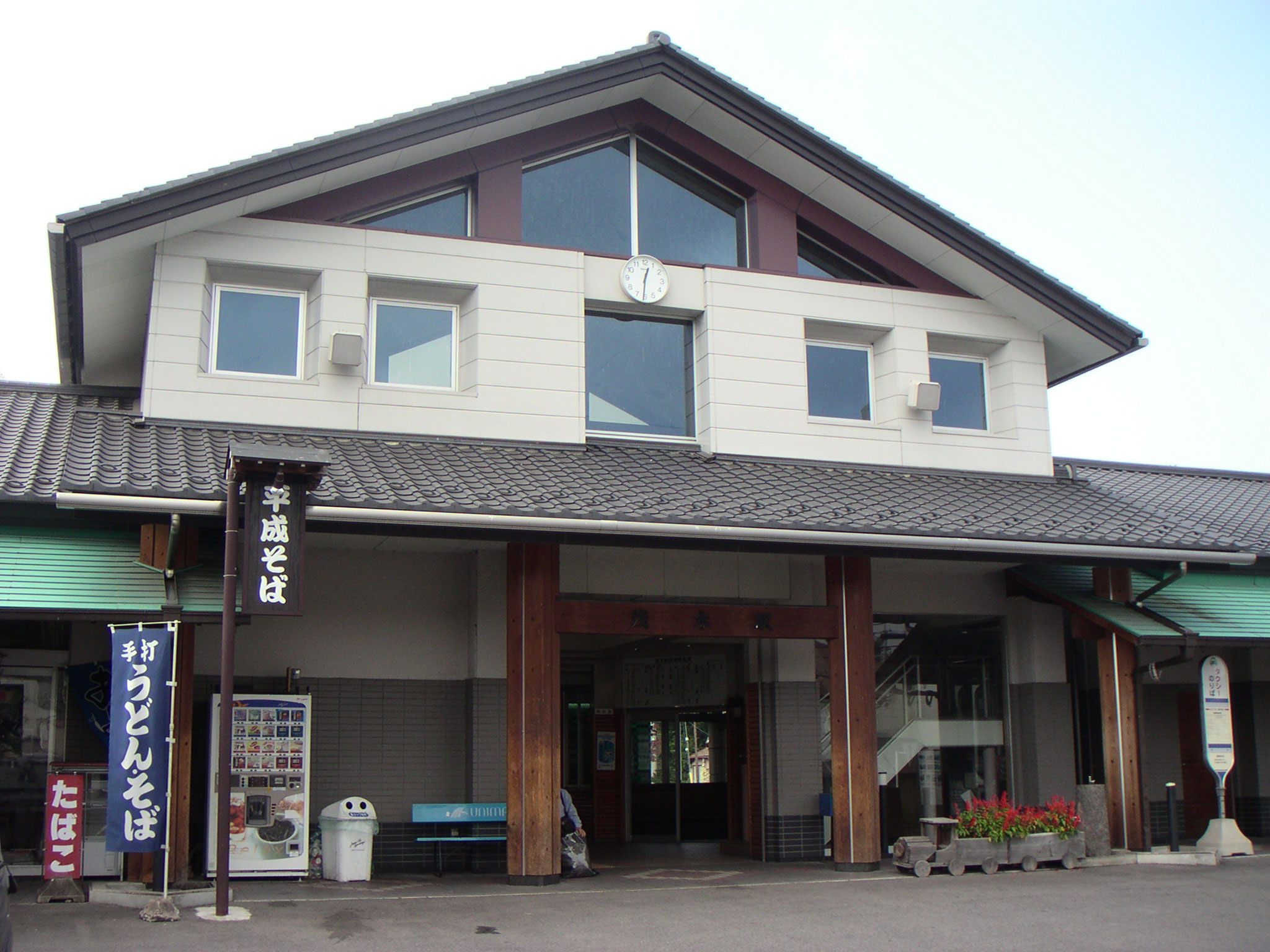
- Motegi Station (October 2006)

General information
- Location: Motegi, Motegi, Haga, Tochigi （栃木県芳賀郡茂木町大字茂木） Japan
- Coordinates: 36°31′51″N 140°10′54″E
- Operator: Mooka Railway
- Line: Mooka Line
- Platforms: 1 (1 side platform)

History
- Opened: December 15, 1920

Passengers
- FY 2015: 341 daily

Services
Preceding station	Mooka Railway	Following station
Ichihana towards Shimodate	SL Mooka	Terminus
Ten'yaba towards Shimodate	Mooka Line	Terminus
Location
- Location within Tochigi Prefecture Location within Japan

Motegi Station (茂木駅, Motegi-eki) is a railway station in Motegi, Tochigi Prefecture, Japan, operated by the Mooka Railway.

== Lines ==
Motegi Station is a terminal station for the Mooka Line, and is located 41.9 rail kilometers from the opposite terminus of the line at Shimodate Station.

== Station layout ==
Motegi Station has one side platform. The station also has a steam-powered railway turntable for use by steam locomotives

== History ==
Motegi Station opened on 15 December 1920 as a station on the Japanese Government Railway, which subsequently became the Japanese National Railways (JNR). The station was absorbed into the JR East network upon the privatization of the JNR on 1 April 1987, and the Mooka Railway from 11 April 1988.

== Surrounding area ==
- Motegi Town Hall
- Motegi Post Office

== Bus routes ==
- JR Bus Kanto
  - For Utsunomiya Station and Twin Ring Motegi
- NasuKarasuyama Municipal Bus
  - For Karasuyama Station and Ichihana Station
