= Japan National Route 294 =

Road in Japan

National Route 294
- 国道294号
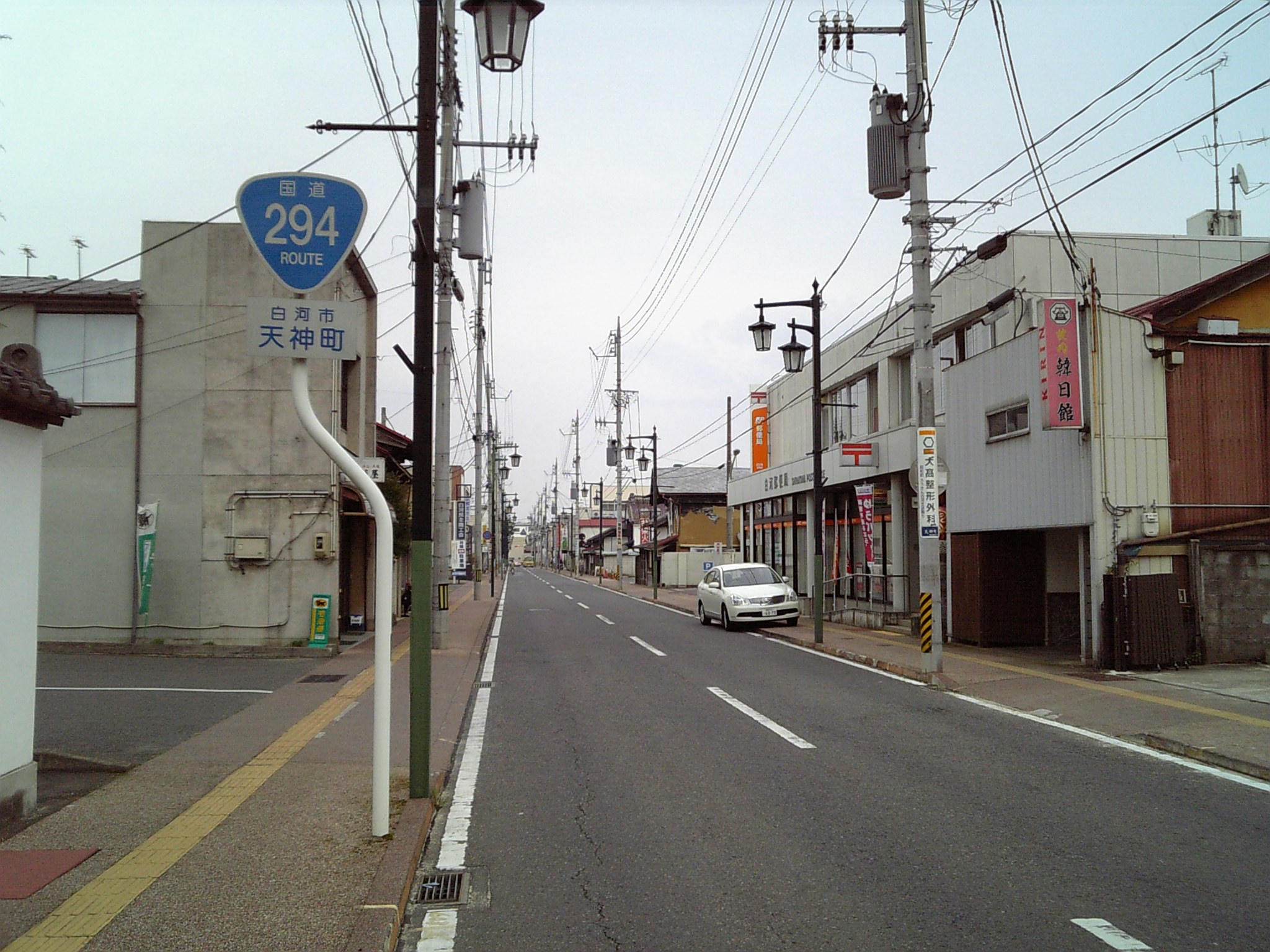

Route information
- Length: 249.9 km (155.3 mi)
- Existed: 1 April 1970–present

Major junctions
- North end: National Route 118 in Aizuwakamatsu, Fukushima
- South end: National Route 6 in Kashiwa, Chiba

Location
- Country: Japan

Highway system
- National highways of Japan; Expressways of Japan
← National Route 293	→ National Route 295

National Route 294 is a national highway of Japan connecting Kashiwa, Chiba and Aizuwakamatsu, Fukushima in Japan, with a total length of 249.9 km (155.28 mi).
