= Kitasōma District =

District of Japan

Coordinates: 35.8682°N 140.165°E

Location of Kitasōma District in Ibaraki Prefecture

Kitasōma (北相馬郡, Kitasōma-gun) is a district located in Ibaraki Prefecture, Japan.

As of November 1, 2021, the district has a population of 14,898. The total area is 24.90 km^{2} (9.61 sq mi).

Currently, the district has only one town left.

- Tone

== Timeline ==
- December 2, 1878 - The district was founded when Sōma District in Shimōsa Province split into Kitasōma District in Ibaraki Prefecture and Minamisōma District in Chiba Prefecture.
- March 13, 1947 - The village of Ino merged into the town of Toride.
- March 20, 1954 - The villages of Kawarashiro and Kitamonma were merged into the town of Ryūgasaki in Inashiki District. The town gained city status at the same time.
- March 21, 1954 - The parts of the village of Takasu merged into the city of Ryūgasaki.
- July 10, 1954 - The village of Sakate merged into the town of Mitsukaidō in Yūki District. The town gained city status at the same time.
- January 1, 1955 - The town of Fukawa and the villages of Monma, Fumi, and Higashimonma merged to form the town of Tone.
- February 21, 1955
  - The town of Sōma and the villages of Rokugō, Sannō, and parts of Takasu merged to form the town of Fujishiro.
  - The remaining parts of Takasu was merged into the city of Ryūgasaki.
- March 1, 1955
  - The town of Moriya and the villages of Kōya, Ōno, and Ōisawa merged to form the town of Moriya.
  - The village of Kokinu merged with the villages of Yahara, Jūwa, and Fukuoka from Tsukuba District to form the town of Yawara (On March 27, 2006, Yawara, along with the town of Ina (also from Tsukuba District), was merged to create the city of Tsukubamirai).
- April 1, 1956 - The villages of Uchimoriya and Sugao were merged into the city of Mitsukaidō.
- October 1, 1970 - The town of Toride gained city status.
- February 2, 2002 - The town of Moriya gained city status.
- March 28, 2005 - The town of Fujishiro merged into the expanded city of Toride.
