= Fukuoka Dam =

Dam in Ibaraki Prefecture, Japan

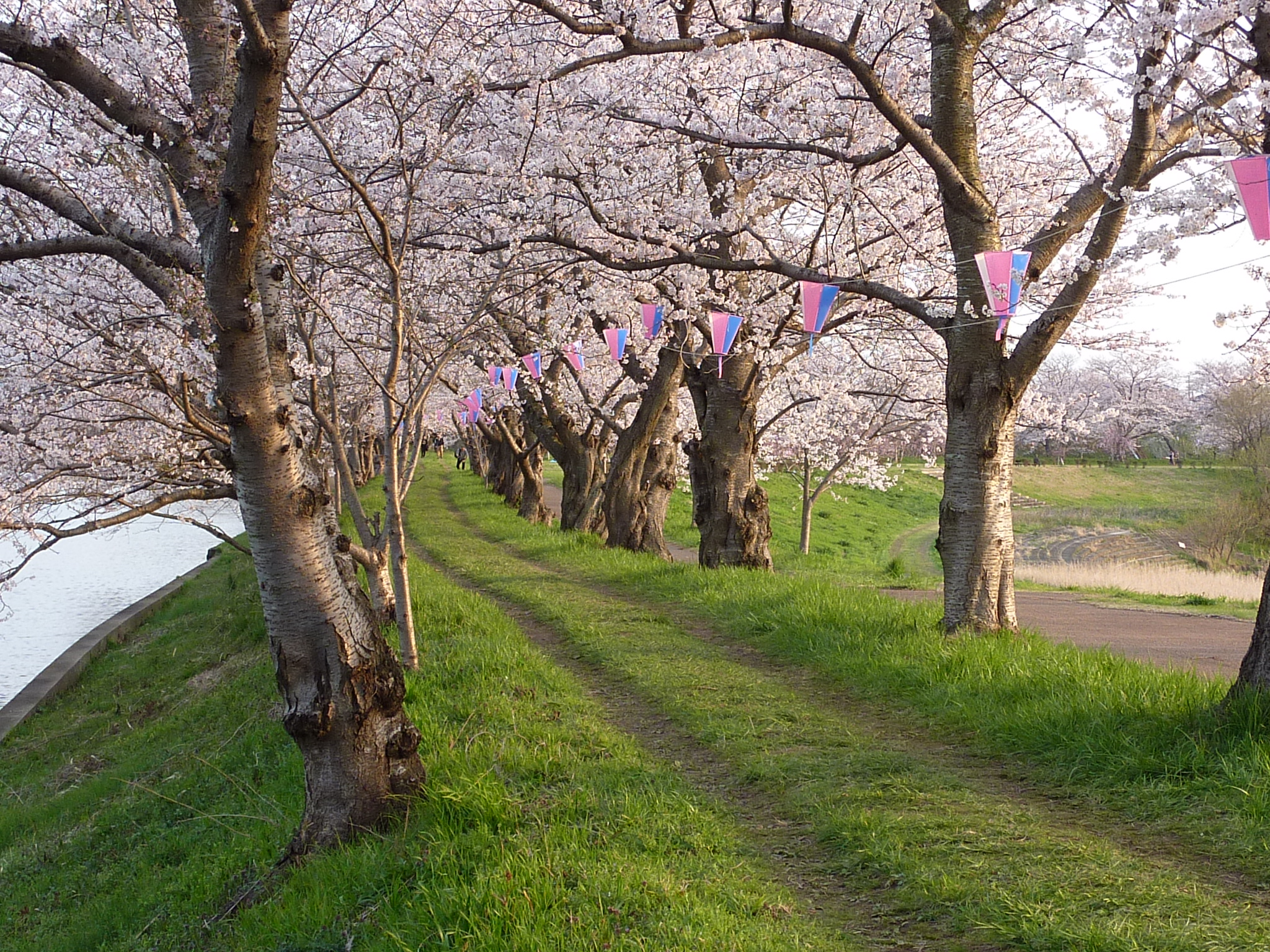
- Cherry blossoms at Fukuoka Dam. April 6, 2010

- Location within Ibaraki Prefecture Location within Japan
- Interactive map of Fukuoka Dam
- Official name: 福岡堰
- Location: Ibaraki Prefecture, Japan
- Coordinates: 36°02′34″N 140°01′36″E
- Construction began: 1625

Reservoir
- Total capacity: 2750000 tonnes

Fukuoka Dam (Japanese: 福岡堰, fukuoka seki) is a dam that spans the Kokai River in Tsukubamirai, Ibaraki, Japan. It is one of the three largest dams in the Kanto Region. It is also the location of the Fukuoka Dam Sakura Park.

== History ==
The dam, which was originally called Yamada-numa Dam, was constructed in 1625 for irrigation purposes. Until that time, the area was a marshland that was prone to flooding and was, therefore, unsuitable for farming. After the dam was constructed, it became possible to grow rice in the area.

When it was rebuilt in the Fukuoka area of the city (currently called Kitayama) in 1722, it was renamed Fukuoka Dam. It was rebuilt in wood in 1886 and again in reinforced concrete in 1923. Due to an increase in the flow of the Kokai River and the fact that the dam was deteriorating due to age, it was rebuilt again from 1965 to 1971. The total storage capacity of the dam is 2750000 tonnes and it is still in use today as a source of water for rice fields downstream.

Fukuoka Dam Sakura Park (福岡堰さくら公園, fukuoka seki sakura kōen) was opened in March 2006. Approximately 550 Yoshino cherry trees, stretching for 1.8 km, can be found in the area between the Kokai River and the dam. The park also includes a playground for children and multipurpose fields and it is the site of the Fukuoka Dam Sakura Park Festival every year when the cherry blossoms bloom.

In 2006, the dam was designated one of the top 100 agricultural waterways in Japan by the Ministry of Agriculture, Forestry and Fisheries.

== Access ==
- Take the Tsukuba Express to Miraidaira Station and then catch the Community Bus Mirai to "Fukuoka Seki Sakura Koen" (福岡堰さくら公園).
- Take the Tsukuba Express to Midorino Station and then catch a bus to "Fukuoka Tera Mae" (福岡寺前). From there it is a 20-minute walk.
