= Kasumigaura, Ibaraki =

Kasumigaura かすみがうら市
- City
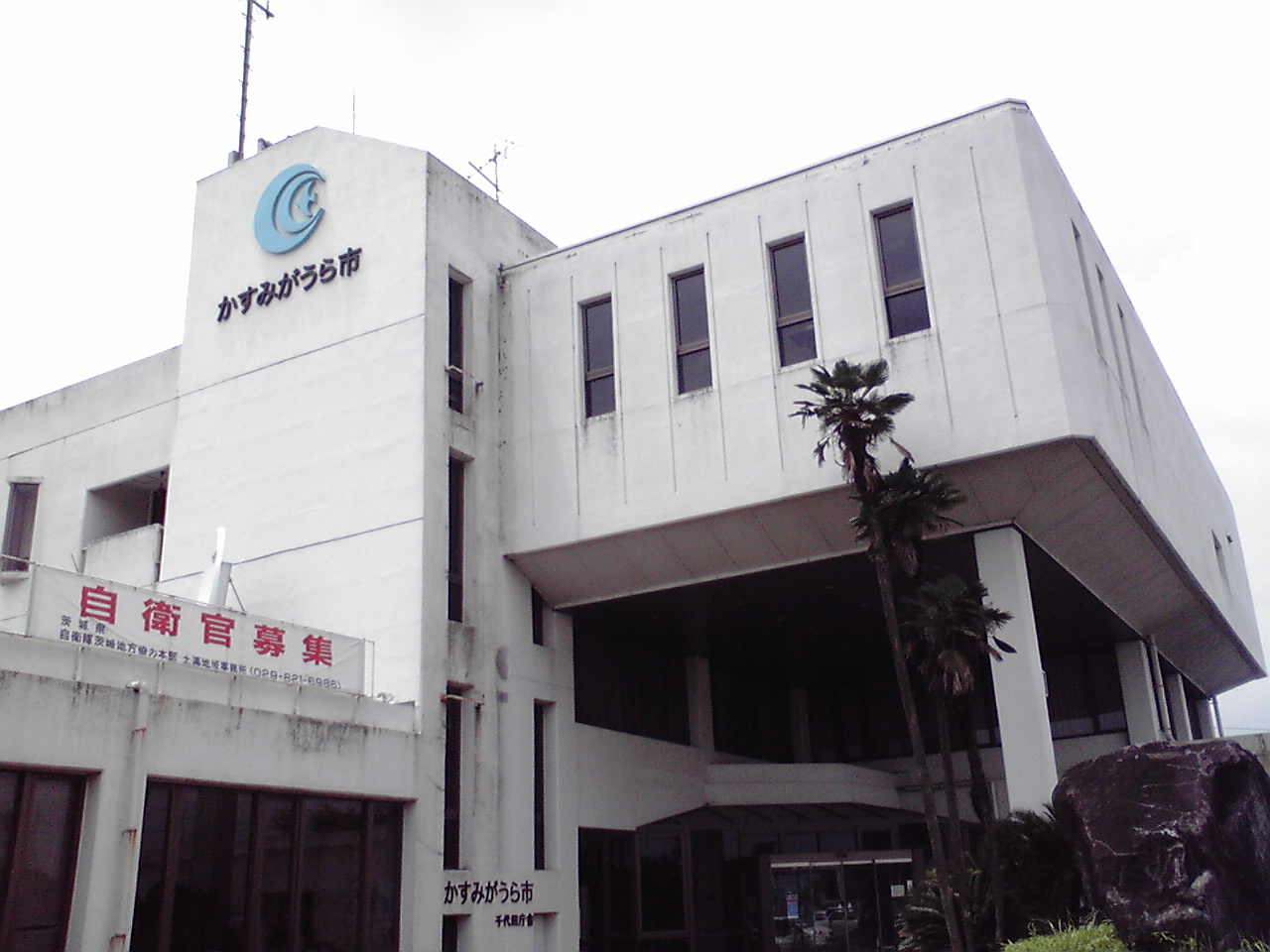
- Kasumigaura city hall

- Flag Emblem

- Location of Kasumigaura in Ibaraki Prefecture

- Coordinates: 36°9′6.3″N 140°14′13.6″E
- Country: Japan
- Region: Kantō
- Prefecture: Ibaraki

Government
  - Mayor: Toru Tsuboi (since July 2014)

Area
  - Total: 156.60 km^{2} (60.46 sq mi)

Population (October 2020)
  - Total: 40,254
  - Density: 257.05/km^{2} (665.76/sq mi)
- Time zone: UTC+9 (Japan Standard Time)
- Tree: Japanese Chestnut
- Flower: Hydrangea
- Bird: Japanese bush warbler
- Phone number: 0299-59-2111
- Address: 461 Kamitsuchida, Kasumigaura-shi, Ibaraki-ken 315-8512
- Website: Official website

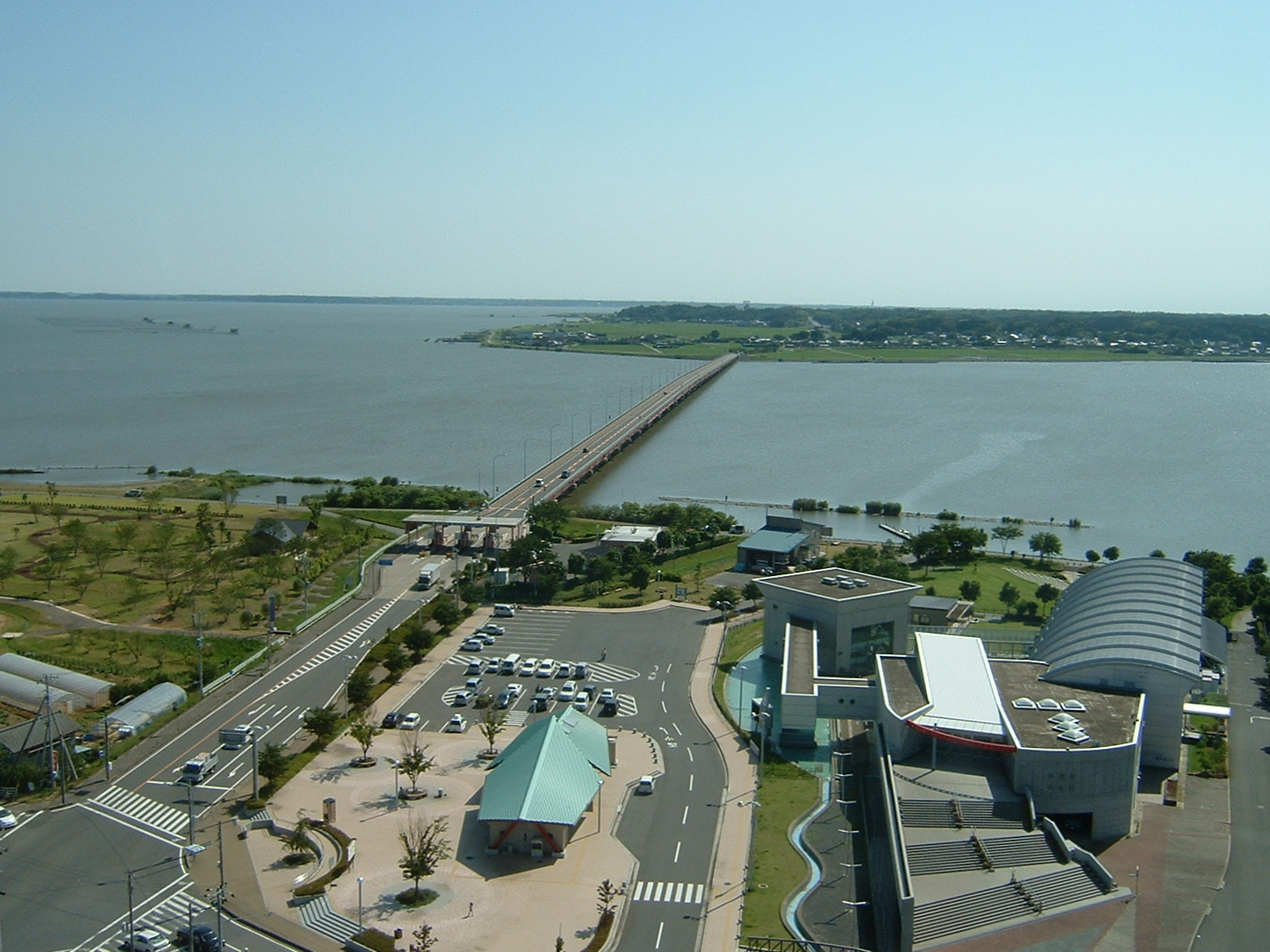
Kasumigaura Bridge

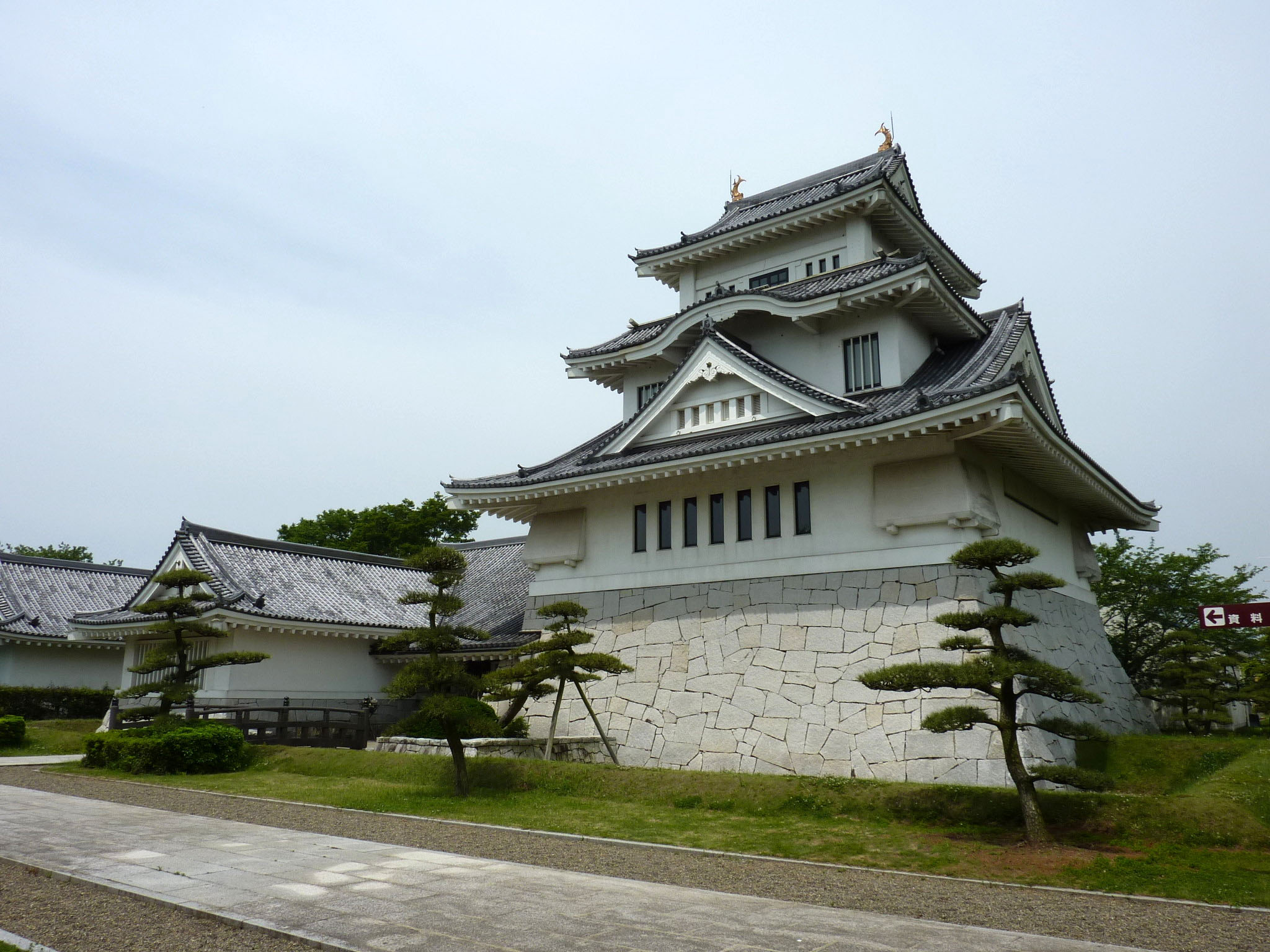
Kasumigaura History Museum

Kasumigaura (かすみがうら市, Kasumigaura-shi) is a city located in Ibaraki Prefecture, Japan. As of 1 July 2020, the city had an estimated population of 40,254 in 15,839 households and a population density of 257 persons per km^{2}. The percentage of the population aged over 65 was 32.0%. The total area of the city is 156.60 square kilometres (60.46 sq mi). . The city takes its name from the nearby lake, Lake Kasumigaura. The city has the distinction of having the longest name in Japan (in terms of the number of characters used), together with Ichikikushikino, Kagoshima Prefecture and Tsukubamirai. Much of the city is within the borders of the Suigō-Tsukuba Quasi-National Park.

== Geography ==
Kasumigaura is located in central Ibaraki Prefecture, on a peninsula bordered by Lake Kasumigaura on two sides to the southeast and southwest. It is approximately 60 kilometers to the northeast of Tokyo.

=== Surrounding municipalities ===
Ibaraki Prefecture

- Ishioka
- Tsuchiura

=== Climate ===
Kasumigaura has a humid subtropical climate (Köppen Cfa) characterized by warm summers and cold winters with heavy snowfall. The average annual temperature in Kasumigaura is 13.7 °C. The average annual rainfall is 1311 mm with September as the wettest month. The temperatures are highest on average in August, at around 25.8 °C, and lowest in January, at around 2.7 °C.

== Demographics ==
Per Japanese census data, the population of Kasumigaura peaked around the year 2000 and has declined since.

Historical population
| Year | Pop. | ±% |
|---|---|---|
| 1920 | 23,483 | — |
| 1930 | 24,689 | +5.1% |
| 1940 | 25,842 | +4.7% |
| 1950 | 32,153 | +24.4% |
| 1960 | 29,976 | −6.8% |
| 1970 | 30,262 | +1.0% |
| 1980 | 38,797 | +28.2% |
| 1990 | 43,013 | +10.9% |
| 2000 | 45,229 | +5.2% |
| 2010 | 43,553 | −3.7% |
| 2020 | 40,087 | −8.0% |

== History ==
The village of Dejima was established within Niihari District on February 11, 1955 through the merger of the villages of Shimootsu, Minami, Ushiwata, Saga, Anshoku and Shishiko. It was elevated to town status on April 1, 1997 and was renamed Kasumigaura. The town of Kasumigaura merged with the neighboring town of Chiyoda on March 28, 2005, becoming the city of Kasumigaura.

== Government ==
Kasumigaura has a mayor-council form of government with a directly elected mayor and a unicameral city council of 16 members. Kasumigaura contributes one member to the Ibaraki Prefectural Assembly. In terms of national politics, the city is part of Ibaraki 6th district of the lower house of the Diet of Japan.

== Economy ==
Kasumigaura has primarily an agricultural economy, with lotus roots, and various fruits as the major cash crops. Aquaculture on Lake Kasumigaura also plays a role.

== Education ==
Kasumigaura has eight public elementary schools and three public middle schools operated by the city government. The city does have a public high school, but it has one private combined elementary/middle school and one private high school.

== Transportation ==
=== Railway ===
- Kasumigaura does not have any passenger railway service. The nearest train station is Kandatsu on the JR East Jōban Line in neighboring Tsuchiura.

=== Highway ===
- Jōban Expressway – Chiyoda-Ishioka Interchange
- National Route 6
- National Route 354

== Local attractions ==
- Lake Kasumigaura

== Notable people from Kasumigaura ==
- Katsuhiko Saka, professional baseball player
