= Yawara (disambiguation) =

The yawara is a Japanese weapon used in various martial arts.

Yawara may also refer to:

- Yawara, an obsolete term for jujutsu (based on an alternate pronunciation of the 柔 kanji)
- Yawara!, a manga series, as well as the anime and live-action series based on the manga
- "Yawara-chan", the nickname of Ryoko Tani, after the main character in the Yawara! manga
- Yawara, Ibaraki, a village in Ibaraki Prefecture, Japan

== People with the given name ==
- Yawara Hata (畑 和, 1910–1996), Japanese politician
