= Ibaraki 6th district =

- Parliamentary constituency for the Japanese House of Representatives
- Numbered map of Ibaraki Prefecture single-member districts
- Prefecture: Ibaraki
- Proportional District: Northern Kanto
- Electorate: 454,288

Current constituency
- Created: 1994
- Seats: One
- Party: LDP
- Representative: Ayano Kunimitsu
- Municipalities: Cities of Ishioka, Kasumigaura, Tsuchiura, Tsukuba, and Tsukubamirai.

Ibaraki 6th district (茨城県第6区, Ibaraki-ken dai-rokku or simply 茨城6区, Ibaraki-rokku) is a single-member constituency of the House of Representatives in the national Diet of Japan located in Ibaraki Prefecture.

== Areas covered ==
=== Since 2022 ===
- Ishioka
- Kasumigaura
- Tsuchiura
- Tsukuba
- Tsukubamirai

=== 2013 - 2022 ===
- Ishioka
- Kasumigaura
- Part of Omitama
- Tsuchiura
- Tsukuba
- Tsukubamirai

=== 1994 - 2013 ===
- Ishioka
- Tsuchiura
- Tsukuba
- Part of Inashiki District
- Niihari District
- Tsukuba District

== List of representatives ==
Election	Representative	Party	Notes
1996	Yuya Niwa	LDP	
2000	Yuya Niwa	LDP	
2003	Yuya Niwa	LDP	
2005	Yuya Niwa	LDP	
2009	Hiroko Oizumi	Democratic	
2012	Yuya Niwa	LDP	
2014	Yuya Niwa	LDP	
2017	Ayano Kunimitsu	LDP	
2021	Ayano Kunimitsu	LDP	
2024	Yamato Aoyama	CDP	
2026	Ayano Kunimitsu	LDP	

== Election results ==
=== 2026 ===
2026
Party	Candidate	Votes	%	±%
LDP	Ayano Kunimitsu	107,388	43.2	▼0.72
Independent	Yamato Aoyama (Incumbent)	104,844	42.2	▼7.09
Sanseitō	Maki Horikoshi	23,443	9.4	N/A
JCP	Hideki Inaba	9,902	4	▼2.79
Independent	Kichio Nakamura	2,982	1.2	N/A
Majority		2,544	1	▼4.37
Registered electors		454,571		
Turnout		248,559	55.92	▼0.19
LDP gain from CDP				

=== 2024 ===
2024
Party	Candidate	Votes	%	±%
CDP	Yamato Aoyama	120,434	49.29	▲1.83
LDP	Ayano Kunimitsu (Incumbent) (Won PR seat)	107,305	43.92	▼8.62
JCP	Michiko Mamiya	16,586	6.79	N/A
Majority		13,129	5.37	
Registered electors		453,939		
Turnout			56.11	▲2.49
CDP gain from LDP				

=== 2021 ===
2021
Party	Candidate	Votes	%	±%
LDP	Ayano Kunimitsu (Incumbent)	125,703	52.54	▲6.65
CDP	Yamato Aoyama (Won PR seat)	113,570	47.46	New
Majority		12,133	5.08	
Registered electors		454,712		
Turnout			53.62	▲2.12
LDP hold				

=== 2017 ===
2017
Party	Candidate	Votes	%	±%
LDP	Ayano Kunimitsu	102,820	45.89	▼5.91
Kibō no Tō	Yamato Aoyama (Won PR seat)	96,987	43.29	New
JCP	Yoshiyuki Furusawa	24,227	10.81	▼0.37
Majority		5,833	2.60	
Registered electors		446,083		
Turnout			51.50	▼3.95
LDP hold				

=== 2014 ===
2014
Party	Candidate	Votes	%	±%
LDP	Yuya Niwa (Incumbent)	119,116	51.80	▲13.61
Democratic	Yamato Aoyama	85,120	37.02	▲20.61
JCP	Keiichi Inoue	25,709	11.18	▲5.45
Majority		33,996	14.78	
Registered electors		431,909		
Turnout			55.45	▼1.86
LDP hold				

=== 2012 ===
2012
Party	Candidate	Votes	%	±%
LDP	Yuya Niwa	91,121	38.19	▼3.77
Independent	Takaya Kanō	45,377	19.02	New
Democratic	Hiroko Oizumi (Incumbent)	39,161	16.41	▼37.92
Restoration	Hiroshi Fukazawa	36,617	15.35	New
JCP	Michiko Aoki	13,680	5.73	N/A
Tomorrow	Tenshin Kuriyama	12,644	5.30	New
Majority		45,744	19.17	
Registered electors		428,923		
Turnout			57.31	
LDP gain from Democratic				

=== 2009 ===
2009
Party	Candidate	Votes	%	±%
Democratic	Hiroko Oizumi	147,865	54.33	▲23.54
LDP	Yuya Niwa (Incumbent)	114,204	41.96	▼14.65
Happiness Realization	Toshihiro Suzuki	10,082	3.71	New
Majority		33,661	12.37	
Registered electors				
Turnout				
Democratic gain from LDP				

=== 2005 ===
2005
Party	Candidate	Votes	%	±%
LDP	Yuya Niwa (Incumbent)	141,212	56.61	
Democratic	Ryoji Kawaguchi	76,798	30.79	
Independent	Yōko Sakurai	16,769	6.72	New
JCP	Takeshi Tsukamoto	14,680	5.88	
Majority		64,414	25.82	
Registered electors				
Turnout				
LDP hold				

=== 2003 ===
2003
Party	Candidate	Votes	%	±%
LDP	Yuya Niwa (Incumbent)	130,525	58.55	
Democratic	Nobuaki Futami	74,915	33.61	
JCP	Seigo Sato	17,471	7.84	
Majority		55,610	24.94	
Registered electors				
Turnout				
LDP hold				

=== 2000 ===
2000
Party	Candidate	Votes	%	±%
LDP	Yuya Niwa (Incumbent)	125,581	56.55	
Democratic	Hiroko Igarashi	51,292	23.10	New
Liberal	Nobuaki Futami	26,091	11.75	New
JCP	Toyomasa Komatsu	19,110	8.60	
Majority		74,289	33.45	
Registered electors				
Turnout				
LDP hold				

=== 1996 ===
1996
Party	Candidate	Votes	%	±%
LDP	Yuya Niwa	110,495	56.98	New
New Frontier	Kunio Kobayashi	39,372	20.30	New
JCP	Toyomasa Komatsu	20,035	10.33	New
NP-Sakigake	Shigeto Nakahara	15,140	7.81	New
New Socialist	Masami Yanagisawa	7,369	3.80	New
Liberal League	Hiroki Kanōya	1,516	0.78	New
Majority		71,123	36.68	
Registered electors				
Turnout				
LDP win (new seat)				
