= Tokuo Yamashita =

Japanese politician

Tokou Yamashita
- 山下 徳夫

Minister of Health and Welfare
- In office 5 November 1991 – 12 December 1992
- Prime Minister: Kiichi Miyazawa
- Preceded by: Shin'ichirō Shimojō
- Succeeded by: Yuya Niwa

Chief Cabinet Secretary
- In office 10 August 1989 – 26 August 1989
- Prime Minister: Toshiki Kaifu
- Preceded by: Masajuro Shiokawa
- Succeeded by: Mayumi Moriyama

Director-General of the Management and Coordination Agency
- In office 26 January 1987 – 6 November 1987
- Prime Minister: Yasuhiro Nakasone
- Preceded by: Kazuo Tamaki
- Succeeded by: Osamu Takatori

Minister of Transport
- In office 1 November 1984 – 28 December 1985
- Prime Minister: Yasuhiro Nakasone
- Preceded by: Kichizō Hosoda
- Succeeded by: Hiroshi Mitsuzuka

Member of the House of Representatives
- In office 27 December 1969 – 2 June 2000
- Preceded by: Isei Ide
- Succeeded by: Multi-member district
- Constituency: Saga at-large (1969–1996); Kyushu PR (1996–2000)

Personal details
- Born: 7 October 1919 Imari, Saga, Japan
- Died: 1 January 2014 (aged 94) Imari, Saga, Japan
- Party: Liberal Democratic
- Education: Meiji University; Senshu University

Tokuo Yamashita (山下 徳夫, Yamashita Tokuo; 7 October 1919 – 1 January 2014) was a Japanese politician.

== Early life and education ==
Born in Imari, and a graduate of Fukuoka Middle School (present-day Fukuoka Prefectural Fukuoka High School), he studied law first at Meiji University and then at Senshu University, graduating in 1944.

== Political career ==
After honing his skills as a politician in the Saga Prefectural Assembly (where he eventually became speaker), he was elected to the House of Representatives in 1969 on a ticket from the Liberal Democratic Party. After that, he won reelection ten times in a row. In Yasuhiro Nakasone's second cabinet, he was named Transport minister. In Nakasone's third cabinet he was to lead the Management and Coordination Agency.

In Toshiki Kaifu's first cabinet he was named Chief Cabinet Secretary, but had to resign after only 16 days due to a sex scandal.

In Kiichi Miyazawa's cabinet he was Minister of Health, Labour, and Welfare.

Between 1988 and 2003 he was chairperson of the board of trustees of his alma mater, Senshu University.

He retired from national politics in 2000, but remained an adviser for the Saga branch of the LDP.

He died in Imari on 1 January 2014.

Political offices
Preceded by Kichizo Hosoda	Minister of Transportation; 1984–1985	Succeeded by Hiroshi Mitsuzuka
Preceded by Kazuo Tamaki	Director General of the Management and Coordination Agency; 1987	Succeeded by Osamu Takatori
Preceded by Masajuro Shiokawa	Chief Cabinet Secretary; 1989	Succeeded by Mayumi Moriyama
Preceded by Shinichiro Shimojo	Minister of Health and Welfare; 1991–1992	Succeeded by Yuya Niwa
House of Representatives (Japan)
Preceded by Nobuyuki Hanashi	Chair, Social and Labour Affairs Committee of the House of Representatives of Japan; 1980–1981	Succeeded by Shunjiro Karasawa
Preceded by Yataro Mitsubayashi	Chair, Transportation Committee of the House of Representatives of Japan; 1986	Succeeded by Michihiko Kano
Preceded by Hikosaburo Okonogi	Chair, Rules and Administration Committee of the House of Representatives of Japan; 1990–1991	Succeeded by Yoshirō Mori
