= Inatoi Station =

Railway station in Toride, Ibaraki Prefecture, Japan

Inatoi Station 稲戸井駅
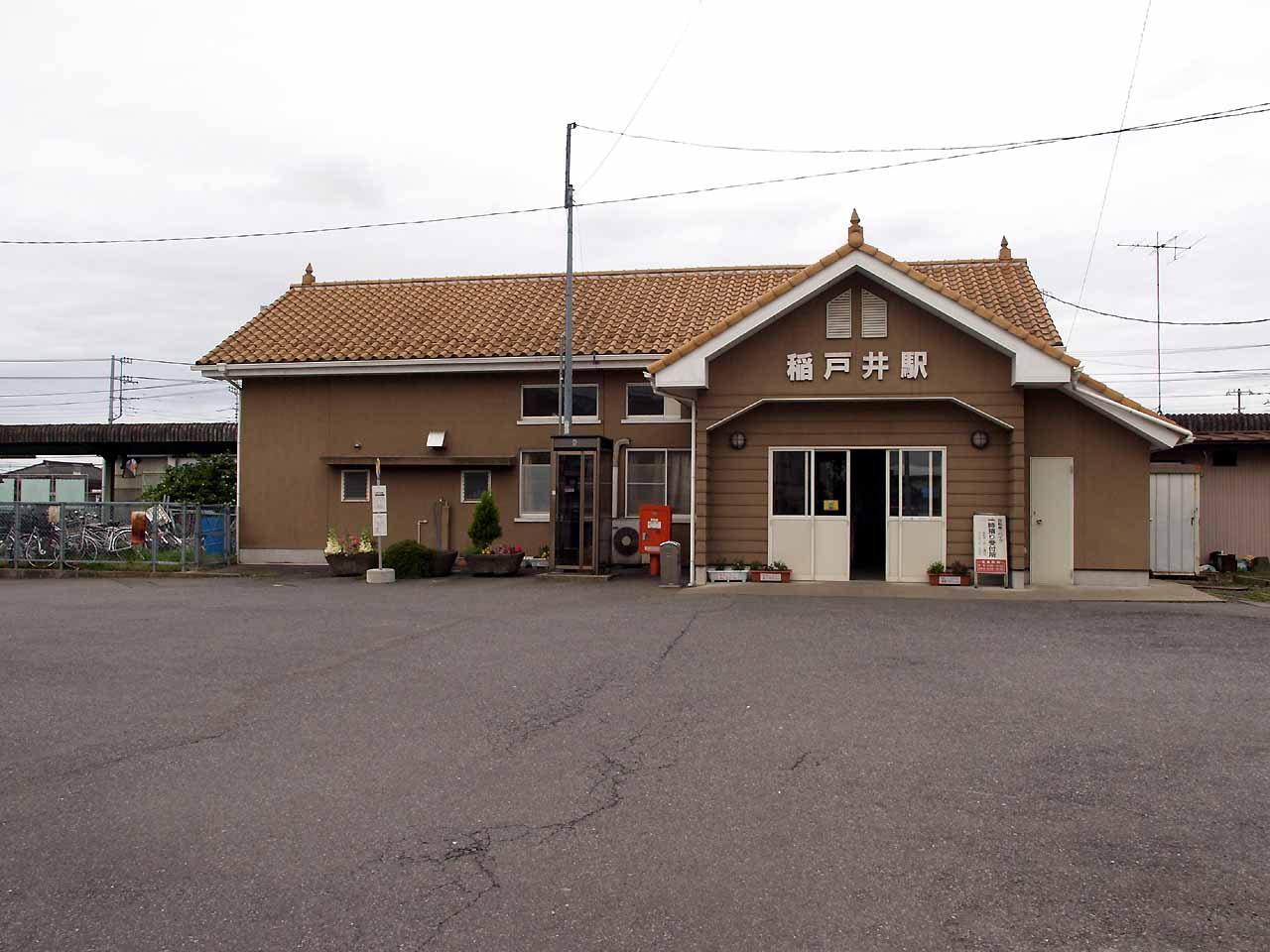
- Inatoi Station, April 2008

General information
- Location: Komenoi 2-2, Toride-shi, Ibaraki-ken 302-0033; Japan
- Coordinates: 35.9259°N 140.0228°E
- Operator: Kantō Railway
- Line: ■ Jōsō Line
- Distance: 5.4 km from Toride
- Platforms: 2 side platforms

Other information
- Status: Unstaffed
- Website: Official website

History
- Opened: 1 November 1913; 112 years ago

Passengers
- FY2018: 1442

Services
Preceding station	Kantō Railway	Following station
Yumemino towards Toride	Jōsō Line Rapid; Local	Togashira towards Shimodate
Location
- Location within Ibaraki Prefecture Location within Japan

Inatoi Station (稲戸井駅, Inatoi-eki) is a passenger railway station in the city of Toride, Ibaraki Prefecture, Japan operated by the private railway company Kantō Railway.

== Lines ==
Inatoi Station is a station on the Kantō Railway’s Jōsō Line, and is located 5.4 km (3.4 mi) from the official starting point of the line at Toride Station.

== Station layout ==
The station consists of two elevated opposed side platforms, connected by a level crossing, with a ground-level station building. The station is unattended.

=== Platforms ===
1	■ Jōsō Line	for Toride
2	■ Jōsō Line	for Shimodate

== History ==
Inatoi Station was opened on 1 November 1913 as a station on the Jōsō Railway, which became the Kantō Railway in 1965.

== Passenger statistics ==
In fiscal 2018, the station was used by an average of 1442 passengers daily (boarding passengers only).

== Surrounding area ==
- National Route 294
- Inatoi Post Office

== See also ==
- List of railway stations in Japan
