= Fujishiro, Ibaraki =

Dissolved municipality in Ibaraki prefecture, Japan

Coordinates: 35°55′N 140°07′E

Fujishiro was a town in Kitasōma District, Ibaraki Prefecture, Japan. It was established in 1955 and was merged into the expanded city of Toride on 28 March 2005. Before the merger, the town had an area of 32.87 square kilometres and a population of 33,152 in February 2002.

== Geography ==
Fujishiro was located in southern Ibaraki Prefecture. The Jōban Line and National Route 6 ran through the middle of the town, and the area was also shaped by the Kokai River and Ushiku Swamp. Okaseki Suijin Park in Fujishiro was selected as one of the Ibaraki Nature 100 Selections.

== History ==
The area prospered as part of the Mito Kaidō, one of the major roads of the Edo period. The post stations of Fujishiro and Miyawada functioned together as a single station area, and each maintained a honjin for visiting daimyō and shogunal officials. The modern town of Fujishiro was created on 21 February 1955 through a municipal merger in Kitasōma District.

In the later 20th century, the town developed both as a residential area and as a local commercial and industrial center because of its rail and highway connections. A Toride City historical chronology notes, among other local milestones, the opening of Fujishiro Station's elevated station building in 1987 and the completion of the Fujishiro town office building in 1990.

== Economy ==
Fujishiro had long been part of a productive grain-growing area, and rice and tomatoes were listed as local specialty products by Ibaraki Prefecture. At the same time, the town also supported manufacturing, retailing and suburban housing development.

== International relations ==
Fujishiro signed a sister-city agreement with Yuba City, California, in 1989. After Fujishiro was merged into Toride, the new city continued the relationship.
