= Tsukuba District =

Former district in Ibaraki prefecture, Japan

Tsukuba (筑波郡, Tsukuba-gun) was a district located in Ibaraki Prefecture, Japan. At its greatest extent it included the areas of today's cities of Jōsō, Shimotsuma, Toride, Tsuchiura, Tsukuba, and Tsukuba Mirai. The district had two towns before the dissolution: Ina and Yawara. On March 27, 2006, the town of Ina and the village of Yawara were merged to create the city of Tsukubamirai. Therefore, Tsukuba District was dissolved as a result of this merger.

== Post-WWII timeline ==
- April 1, 1953 – The village of Oho was elevated to town status. (4 towns, 22 villages)
- November 3, 1953 – The village of Kamisato was elevated to town status to become the town of Kamisato. (5 towns, 21 villages)
- June 1, 1954 – The village of Takamichiso was merged into the town of Shimotsuma (from Makabe District). The town of Shimotsuma was elevated to city status at the same day. (5 towns, 20 villages)
- July 1, 1954 – The villages of Mishima, Taniita, Toyo and Kohari were merged to create the village of Ina. (5 towns, 17 villages)
- February 1, 1955 – The towns of Tsukuba and Hojo, and the villages of Tamizuyama, Tai, and Oda were merged to create the town of Tsukuba. (4 towns, 14 villages)
- February 21, 1955 – The village of Kuga had split and was merged into the village of Ina and the town of Fujishiro (in Kitasōma District), respectively. (4 towns, 13 villages)
- March 1, 1955 – The villages of Yahara, Towa and Fukuoka were merged with the village of Kokinu (from Kitasouma District) to create the village of Yawara. (4 towns, 11 villages)
- March 31, 1955 (4 towns, 7 villages)
  - The town of Yatabe, and the villages of Onogawa, Katsuragi, Shimana and parts of Mase were merged to create the town of Yatabe.
  - The remaining parts of the village of Mase was merged into the city of Mitsukaido.
- April 1, 1955 (4 towns, 6 villages)
  - The town of Kamisato, and parts of the village of Asahi were merged to create the town of Toyosato.
  - The town of Oho absorbed the remaining parts of the village of Asahi were merged to create the town of Oho.
- June 10, 1955 – The village of Itabashi was merged into the village of Ina. (4 towns, 5 villages)
- September 30, 1956 (4 towns, 3 villages)
  - The village of Yoshinuma had split and was merged into the towns of Toyosato and Oho (respectively).
  - The village of Sakuoka was merged into the town of Tsukuba.
- July 1, 1957 – The village of Sugama was merged into the town of Tsukuba. (4 towns, 2 villages)
- April 1, 1985 – The village of Ina was elevated to town status. (5 towns, 1 village)
- November 30, 1987 – The towns of Yatabe, Toyosato and Oho merged with the village of Sakura (from Niihari District) to form the city of Tsukuba. (2 towns, 1 village)
- January 31, 1988 – The town of Tsukuba was merged into the city of Tsukuba. (1 town, 1 village)
- March 27, 2006 – The town of Ina and the village of Yawara were merged to create the city of Tsukubamirai. Therefore, Tsukuba District was dissolved as a result of this merger.
