= Togashira Station =

Railway station in Toride, Ibaraki Prefecture, Japan

Togashira Station 戸頭駅
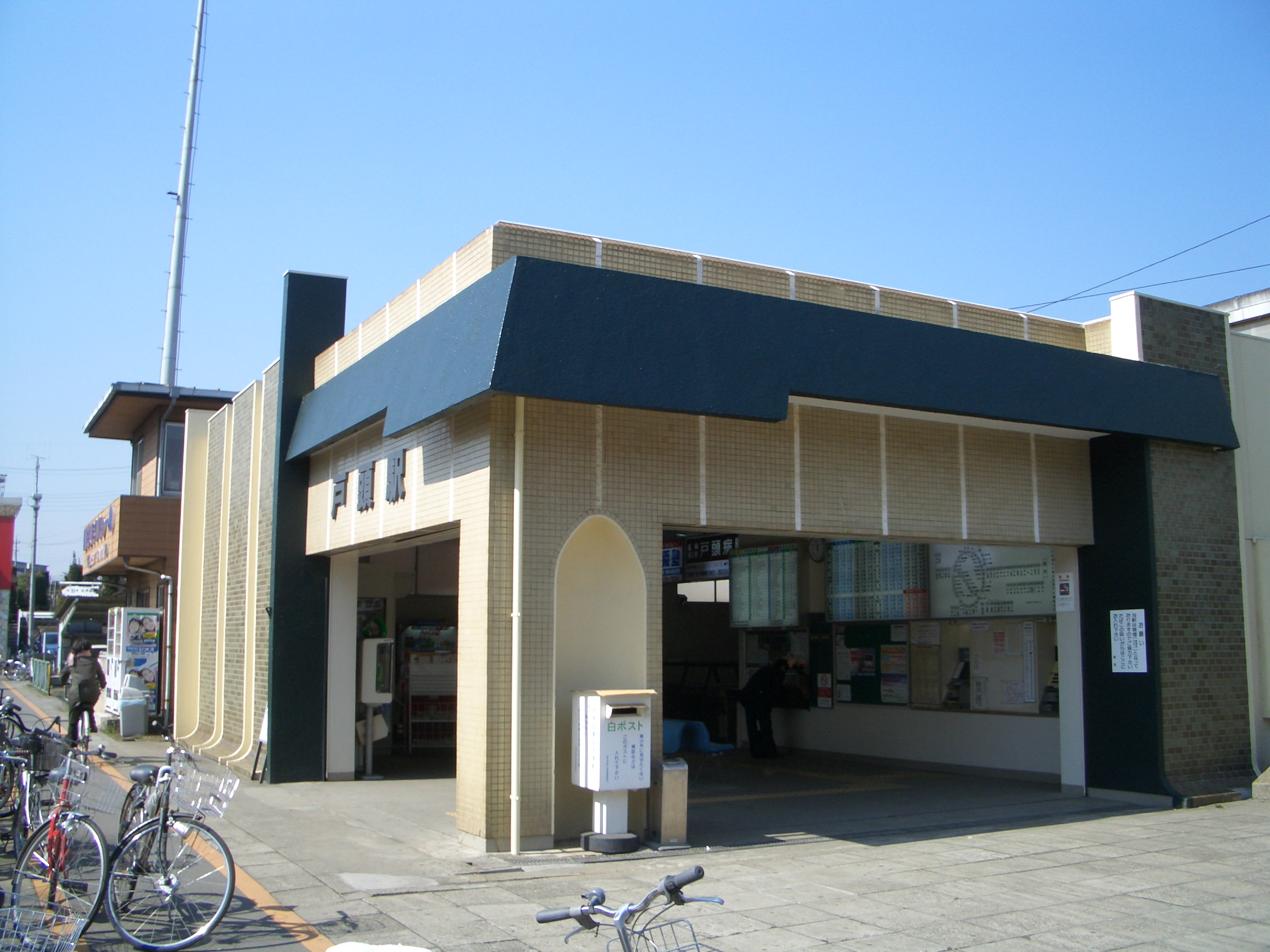
- Togashira Station, March 2005

General information
- Location: Togashira 5-3-1, Toride-shi, Ibaraki-ken 302-0034; Japan
- Coordinates: 35.9293°N 140.0140°E
- Operator: Kantō Railway
- Line: ■ Jōsō Line
- Distance: 6.3 km from Toride
- Platforms: 2 side platforms

Other information
- Status: Staffed
- Website: Official website

History
- Opened: 26 March 1975; 51 years ago

Passengers
- FY2018: 4372

Services
Preceding station	Kantō Railway	Following station
Inatoi towards Toride	Jōsō Line Rapid; Local	Minami-Moriya towards Shimodate
Location
- Location within Ibaraki Prefecture Location within Japan

Togashira Station (戸頭駅, Togashira-eki) is a passenger railway station in the city of Toride, Ibaraki Prefecture, Japan operated by the private railway company Kantō Railway.

== Lines ==
Togashira Station is a station on the Jōsō Line, and is located 6.3 km (3.9 mi) from the official starting point of the line at Toride Station.

== Station layout ==
The station consists of two elevated opposed side platforms, connected by an underpass, with a ground-level station building.

=== Platforms ===
1	■ Jōsō Line	for Toride
2	■ Jōsō Line	for Shimodate

== History ==
Togashira Station was opened on 26 March 1975.

== Passenger statistics ==
In fiscal 2018, the station was used by an average of 4372 passengers daily (boarding passengers only).

== Surrounding area ==
- Togashira Danchi
- Moriya-Izumino New Town

== See also ==
- List of railway stations in Japan
