= Ayano Kunimitsu =

Japanese politician (born 1979)

- 国光 文乃
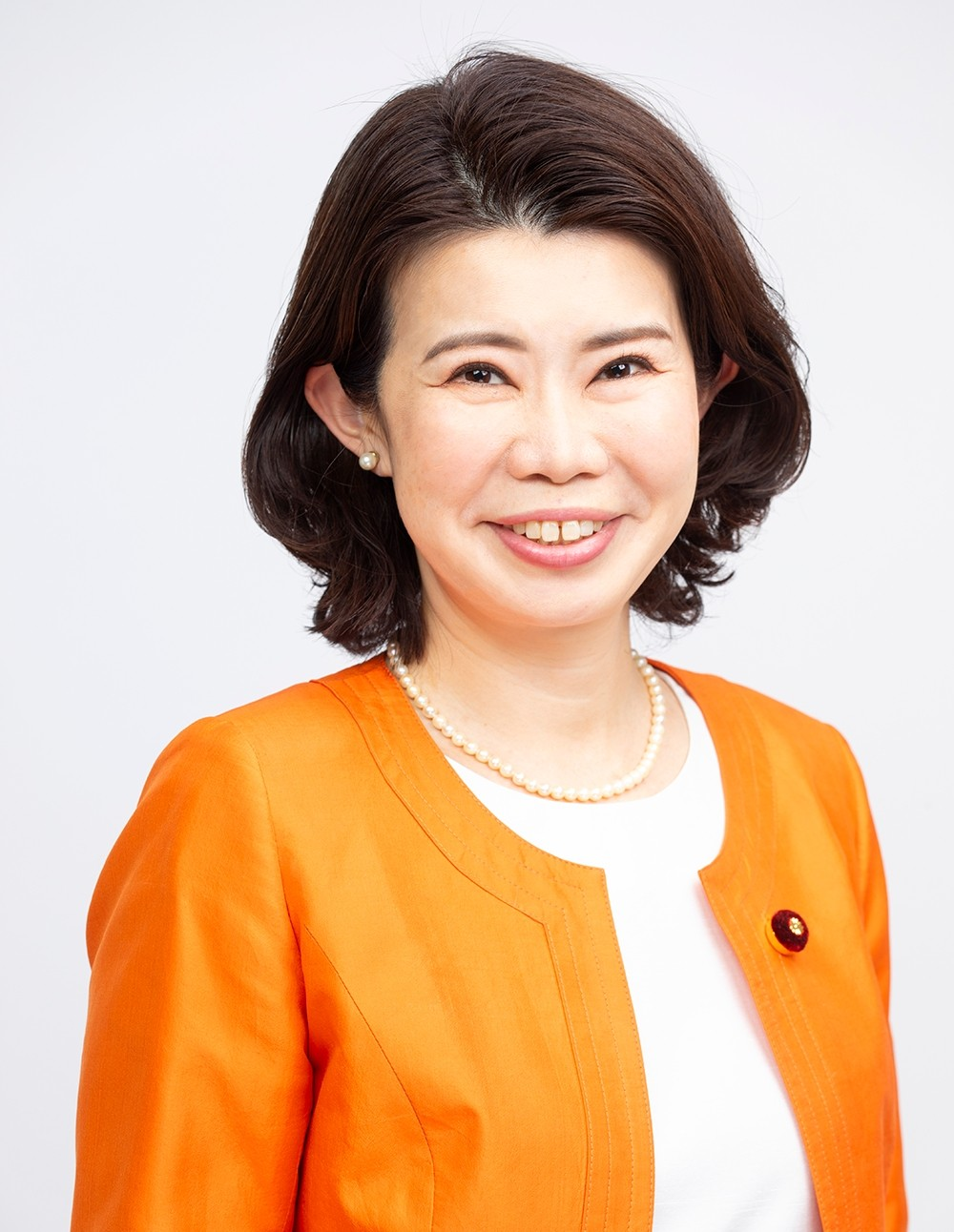
- Official portrait, 2025

Member of the House of Representatives; from Northern Kanto
- Incumbent
- Assumed office 22 October 2017
- Preceded by: Yuya Niwa
- Constituency: Ibaraki 6th (2017–2024); PR block (2024–2026); Ibaraki 6th (2026–present)

Personal details
- Born: 20 March 1979 (age 47) Suō-Ōshima, Yamaguchi, Japan
- Party: Liberal Democratic
- Education: Nagasaki University; University of California, Los Angeles; Tokyo Medical and Dental University

Ayano Kunimitsu (国光文乃, Kunimitsu Ayano; born 20 March 1979) is a Japanese politician serving as deputy minister of foreign affairs since 2025. She has been a member of the House of Representatives since 2017.
