= Yuya Niwa =

Japanese politician

- 丹羽 雄哉
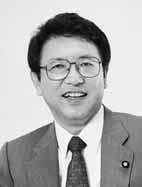
- Official portrait, 2000

Minister of Health and Welfare
- In office 5 October 1999 – 4 July 2000
- Prime Minister: Keizō Obuchi; Yoshirō Mori
- Preceded by: Sohei Miyashita
- Succeeded by: Yūji Tsushima
- In office 12 December 1992 – 9 August 1993
- Prime Minister: Kiichi Miyazawa
- Preceded by: Tokuo Yamashita
- Succeeded by: Keigo Ōuchi

Member of the House of Representatives
- In office 19 December 2012 – 28 September 2017
- Preceded by: Hiroko Oizumi
- Succeeded by: Ayano Kunimitsu
- Constituency: Ibaraki 6th
- In office 8 October 1979 – 21 July 2009
- Preceded by: Kyōshirō Niwa
- Succeeded by: Hiroko Oizumi
- Constituency: Ibaraki 3rd (1979–1996); Ibaraki 6th (1996–2009)

Personal details
- Born: 20 April 1944 (age 82) Tamari, Ibaraki, Japan
- Party: Liberal Democratic
- Parent: Kyōshirō Niwa (father)
- Education: Keio University

Yuya Niwa (丹羽 雄哉, Niwa Yūya; born 20 April 1944) is a former Japanese politician of the Liberal Democratic Party (LDP), who served as a member of the House of Representatives in the Diet (national legislature). A native of Niihari District, Ibaraki and graduate of Keio University he was elected for the first time in 1979 after working as a writer for Yomiuri Shimbun. Later, he served as the Minister of Health in 1992 and in 1999.

He was defeated by Democratic Party of Japan (DPJ)-backed candidate Hiroko Ōizumi (former Lieutenant Governor of Yamaguchi Prefecture) in the Japanese general election, 2009.

House of Representatives (Japan)
Preceded by Yūji Tsushima	Chair, House of Representatives Committee on Social and Labour Affairs; 1989	Succeeded by Eijiro Hata
Preceded by Kosuke Ito	Chair, House of Representatives Committee on Fundamental National Policies; 2004–2006	Succeeded by Takashi Fukaya
Political offices
Preceded by Tokuo Yamashita	Minister of Health and Welfare; 1992–1993	Succeeded by Keigo Ōuchi
Preceded by Sohei Miyashita	Minister of Health and Welfare; 1999–2000	Succeeded by Yūji Tsushima
Party political offices
Preceded by Mitsuo Horiuchi	Head of Kōchikai; 2006	Succeeded by Makoto Koga
Preceded by Fumio Kyūma	Chair, General Council of the Liberal Democratic Party of Japan; 2006–2007	Succeeded by Toshihiro Nikai
