= Katsuhiko Saka =

Japanese baseball player (born 1985)

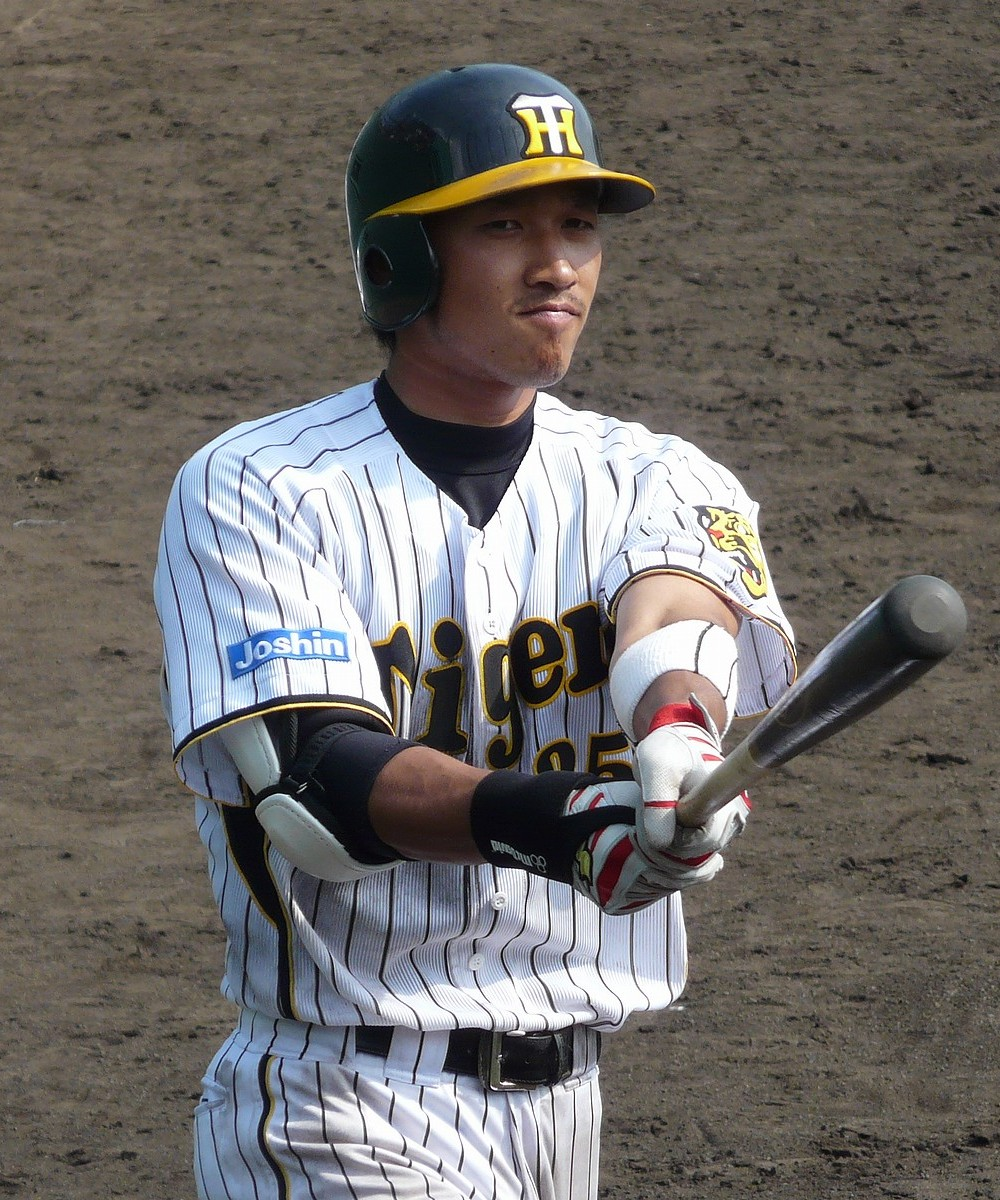
- Saka with the Hanshin Tigers
- Infielder
- Born: September 6, 1985 (age 40); Kasumigaura, Ibaraki
- Bats: Left Throws: Right

NPB debut
- October 14, 2006, for the Hanshin Tigers

Teams
- Osaka Kintetsu Buffaloes (2004); Tohoku Rakuten Golden Eagles (2005–2006); Hanshin Tigers (2006–2016)

Katsuhiko Saka (坂 克彦, Saka Katsuhiko; born September 6, 1985) is a Japanese professional baseball infielder for the Hanshin Tigers in Japan's Nippon Professional Baseball.
