= Tone, Ibaraki =

Tone 利根町
- Town
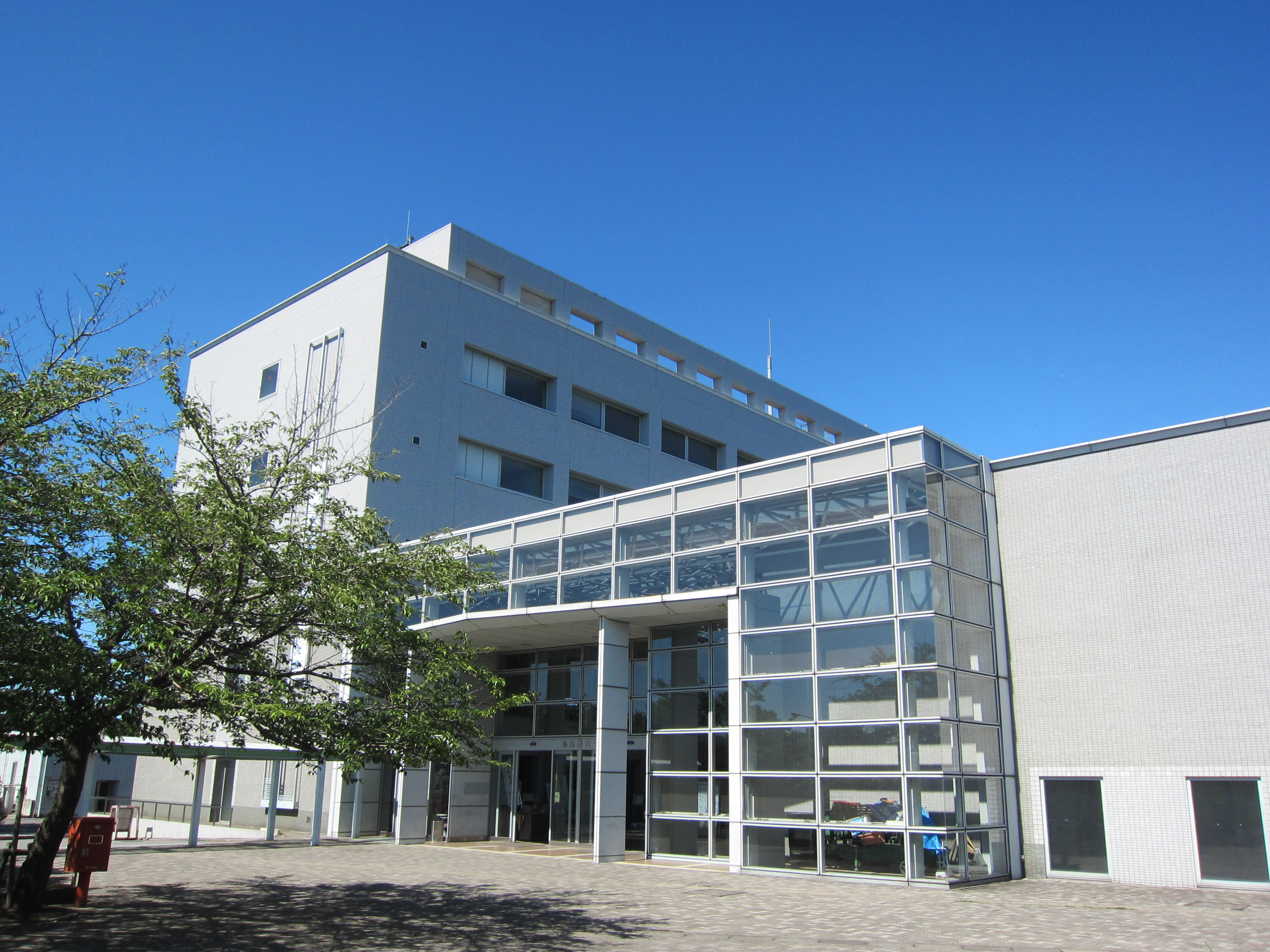
- Tone Town Hall

- Flag Seal

- Location of Tone in Ibaraki Prefecture

- Coordinates: 35°51′28″N 140°08′21.1″E
- Country: Japan
- Region: Kantō
- Prefecture: Ibaraki
- District: Kitasōma

Area
  - Total: 24.90 km^{2} (9.61 sq mi)

Population (September 2020)
  - Total: 15,073
  - Density: 605.3/km^{2} (1,568/sq mi)
- Time zone: UTC+9 (Japan Standard Time)
- Tree: Sakura
- Flower: Canna
- Bird: Yoshikiri (Acrocephalidae)
- Phone number: 0297-68-2211
- Address: 841-1 Fukawa, Tone-machi, Kitasōma-gun, Ibaraki-ken 300-1696
- Website: Official website

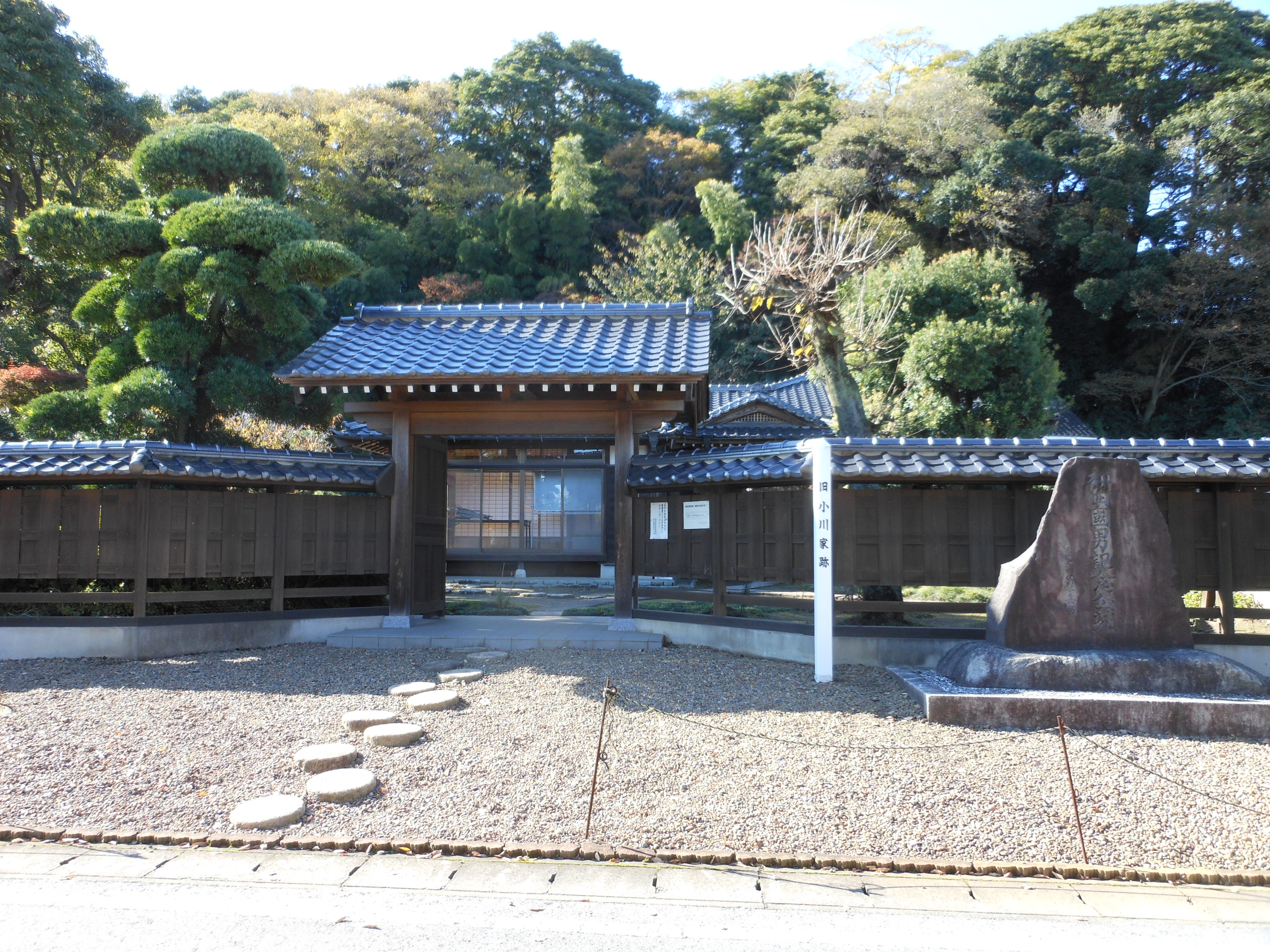
Yanagida Kunio Memorial Museum

Tone (利根町, Tone-machi) is a town in Ibaraki Prefecture, Japan. As of 1 October 2020, the town had an estimated population of 15,073 in 6163 households and a population density of 605 persons per km^{2}. The percentage of the population aged over 65 was 46.6%. The total area of the town is 24.86 square kilometres (9.60 sq mi).

== Geography ==
Tone is located in the flatlands in the very southern portion of Ibaraki Prefecture, bordered by Chiba Prefecture to the south. The Tone River, along with the Shin-Tone River and Kogawa River pass through the town.

=== Neighboring municipalities ===
Chiba Prefecture

- Abiko
- Inzai
- Sakae

Ibaraki Prefecture

- Kawachi
- Ryūgasaki
- Toride

=== Climate ===
Tone has a Humid continental climate (Köppen Cfa) characterized by warm summers and cool winters with light snowfall. The average annual temperature in Kitaibaraki is 14.5 °C. The average annual rainfall is 1345 mm with September as the wettest month. The temperatures are highest on average in August, at around 26.2 °C, and lowest in January, at around 3.8 °C.

== Demographics ==
Per Japanese census data, the population of Tone peaked around 1990 and has steadily declined since.

Historical population
Year	Pop.	±%
1920	7,467	—
1930	7,659	+2.6%
1940	7,627	−0.4%
1950	9,796	+28.4%
1960	9,379	−4.3%
1970	8,262	−11.9%
1980	14,378	+74.0%
1990	20,511	+42.7%
2000	19,033	−7.2%
2010	17,473	−8.2%
2020	15,340	−12.2%

== History ==
The area of present-day Tone was part of Kitasōma District in Shimōsa Province, as the boundary between Shimōsa and Hitachi Province had been established I the Nara period as the Tone River. However, by the Meiji period, the course of the river had shifted, leaving the area of present-day Tone on the northern bank of the river. This area was transferred to Ibaraki Prefecture in 1875. It was organized into the town of Fukawa and the villages of Fumi, and Momma within Kitasōma District, Ibaraki Prefecture with the establishment of the modern municipalities system on April 1, 1889.

The modern town of Tone was founded by the merger of Fukawa with Fumi and Momma on January 1, 1955.

== Government ==
Tone has a mayor-council form of government with a directly elected mayor and a unicameral town council of 12 members. Tone, together with neighboring Ryūgasaki, contributes two members to the Ibaraki Prefectural Assembly. In terms of national politics, the city is part of Ibaraki 3rd district of the lower house of the Diet of Japan.

== Economy ==
Tone was a small agricultural community until the creation of new towns which transformed the area into a commuter town for Tokyo metropolis. However, due to poor transportation connections and an aging population, the population of the town is now in decline and property prices have suffered severe declines. Discussions for a merger with neighboring Ryūgasaki were suspended in 2005, partly due to the town's high debt burden and increasingly poor revenue base.

== Education ==
- Japan Wellness Sports University
- Tone has three public elementary schools and one public middle school operated by town city government. The town does not have a high school.

== Transportation ==
=== Railway ===
Tone does not have any passenger railway line. The nearest station is Fusa on the Abiko branch line of the JR East’s Narita Line.

=== Highway ===
The town is not served by any national highway. Primary access is by Chiba Prefectural Route 4 and 170, and by Ibaraki Prefectural Route 11, 68 and 209.

=== Bus services ===
Several routes operated by Otone Kotsu provide links to Toride station on the JR East's Jōban Line and Fusa station on the JR East's Narita line.

== Local attractions ==
- Yanagida Kunio Memorial Museum

== Noted people from Tone ==
- Jun Sadogawa, manga artist
