= Yumemino Station =

Railway station in Toride, Ibaraki Prefecture, Japan

Yumemino Station ゆめみ野駅
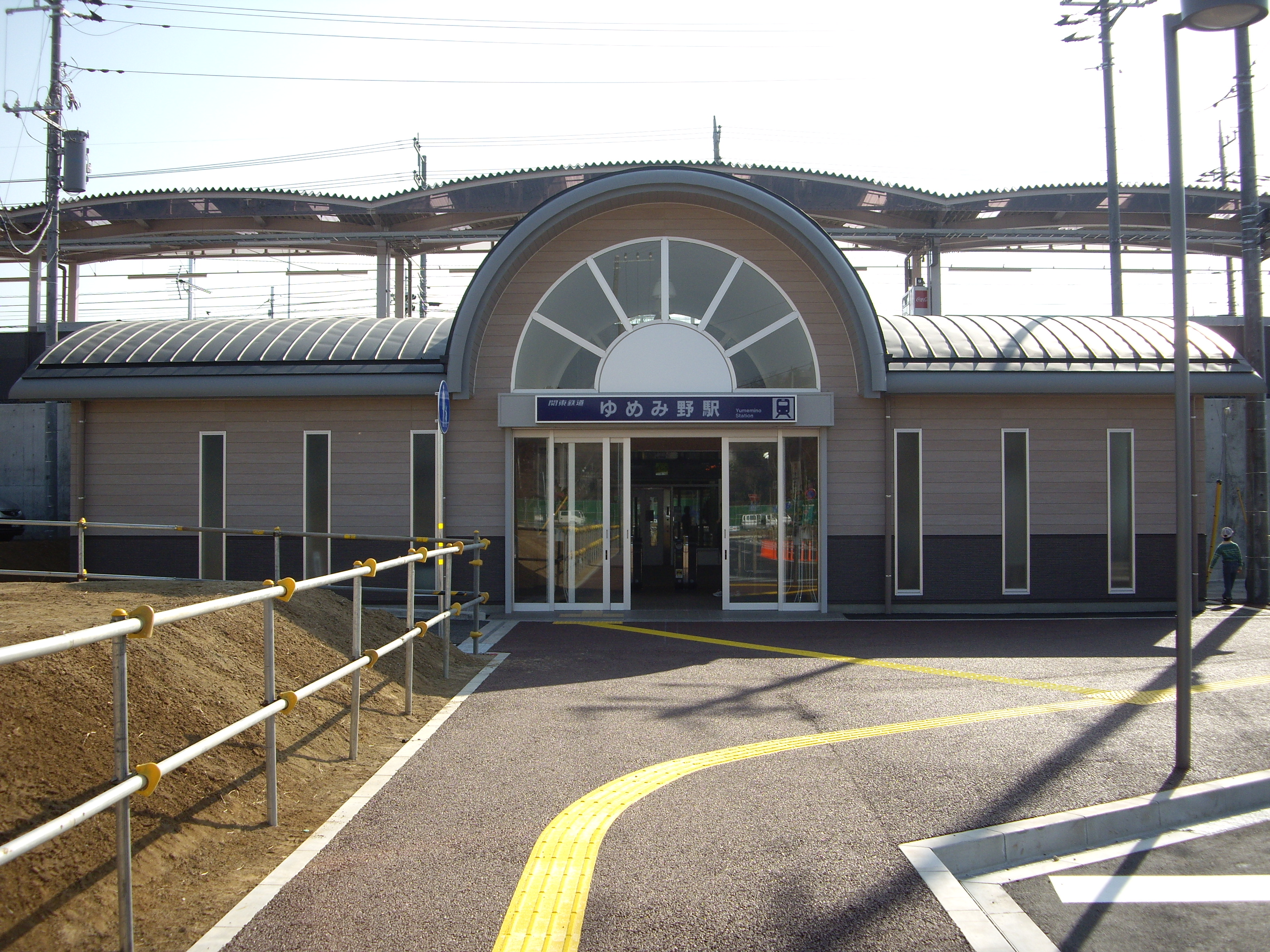
- The station in March 2011

General information
- Location: Nonoi, Toride-shi, Ibaraki-ken 302-0032; Japan
- Coordinates: 35.9211°N 140.0348°E
- Operator: Kantō Railway
- Line: ■ Jōsō Line
- Distance: 4.2 km from Toride
- Platforms: 1 island platform

Other information
- Status: Staffed
- Website: Official website

History
- Opened: 12 March 2011; 15 years ago

Passengers
- FY2018: 1883

Services
Preceding station	Kantō Railway	Following station
Shin-Toride towards Toride	Jōsō Line Rapid; Local	Inatoi towards Shimodate
Location
- Location within Ibaraki Prefecture Location within Japan

Yumemino Station (ゆめみ野駅, Yumemino-eki) is a passenger railway station in the city of Toride, Ibaraki Prefecture, Japan operated by the private railway company Kantō Railway.

== Lines ==
Yumemino Station is served by the Jōsō Line operating between Toride and Shimodate. The station is located 4.2 km (2.6 mi) from the Toride terminus.

== Station layout ==
The station consists of one island platform, connected by an underpass to the station building. The station is unattended.

=== Platforms ===
1	■ Jōsō Line	for Toride
2	■ Jōsō Line	for Shimodate

== History ==
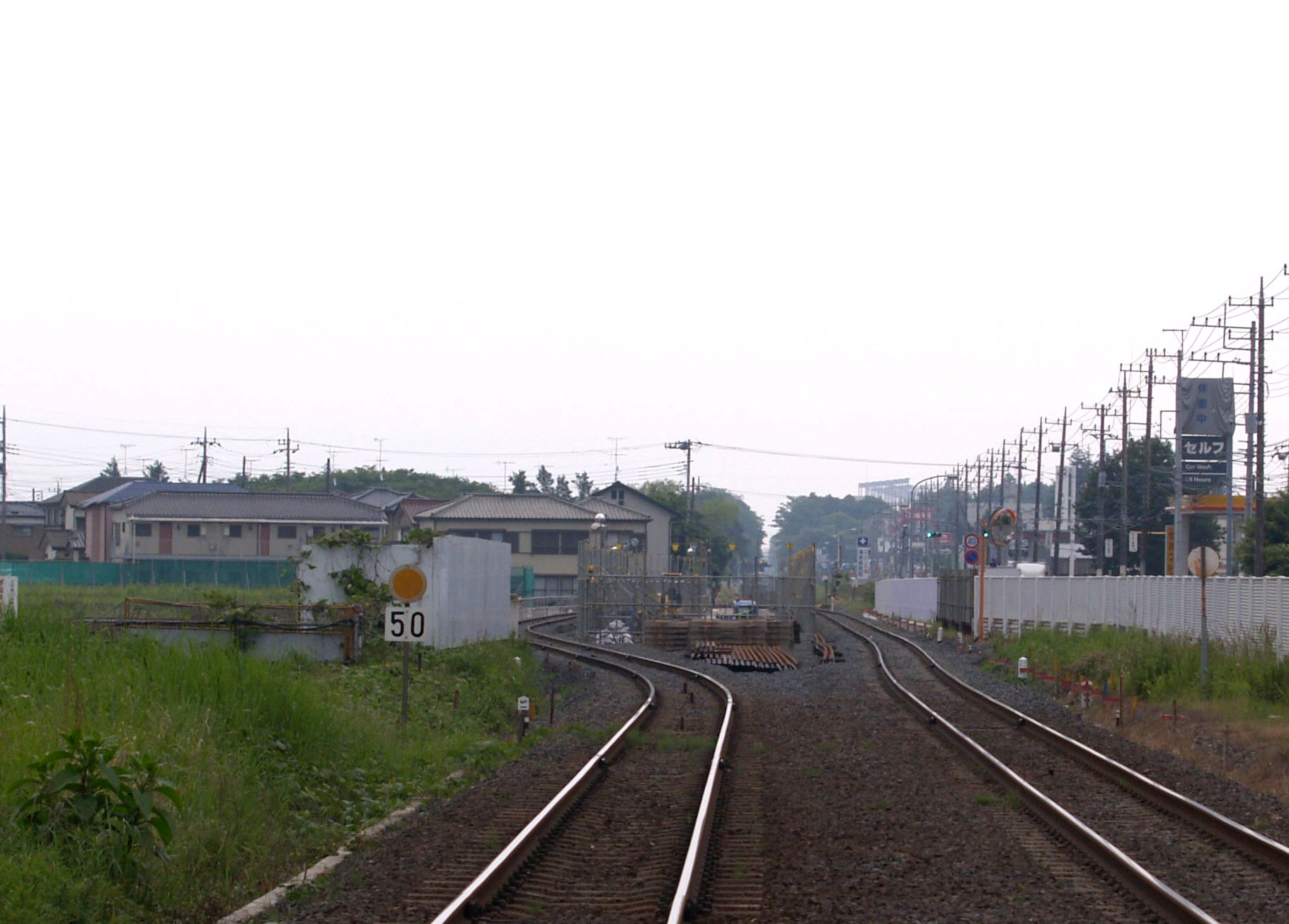
The station under construction in June 2010

The station opened on 12 March 2011.

== Passenger statistics ==
In fiscal 2018, the station was used by an average of 1883 passengers daily (boarding passengers only).

== Surrounding area ==
- National Route 294

== See also ==
- List of railway stations in Japan
