= Shin-Toride Station =

Railway station in Toride, Ibaraki Prefecture, Japan

Shin-Toride Station 新取手駅
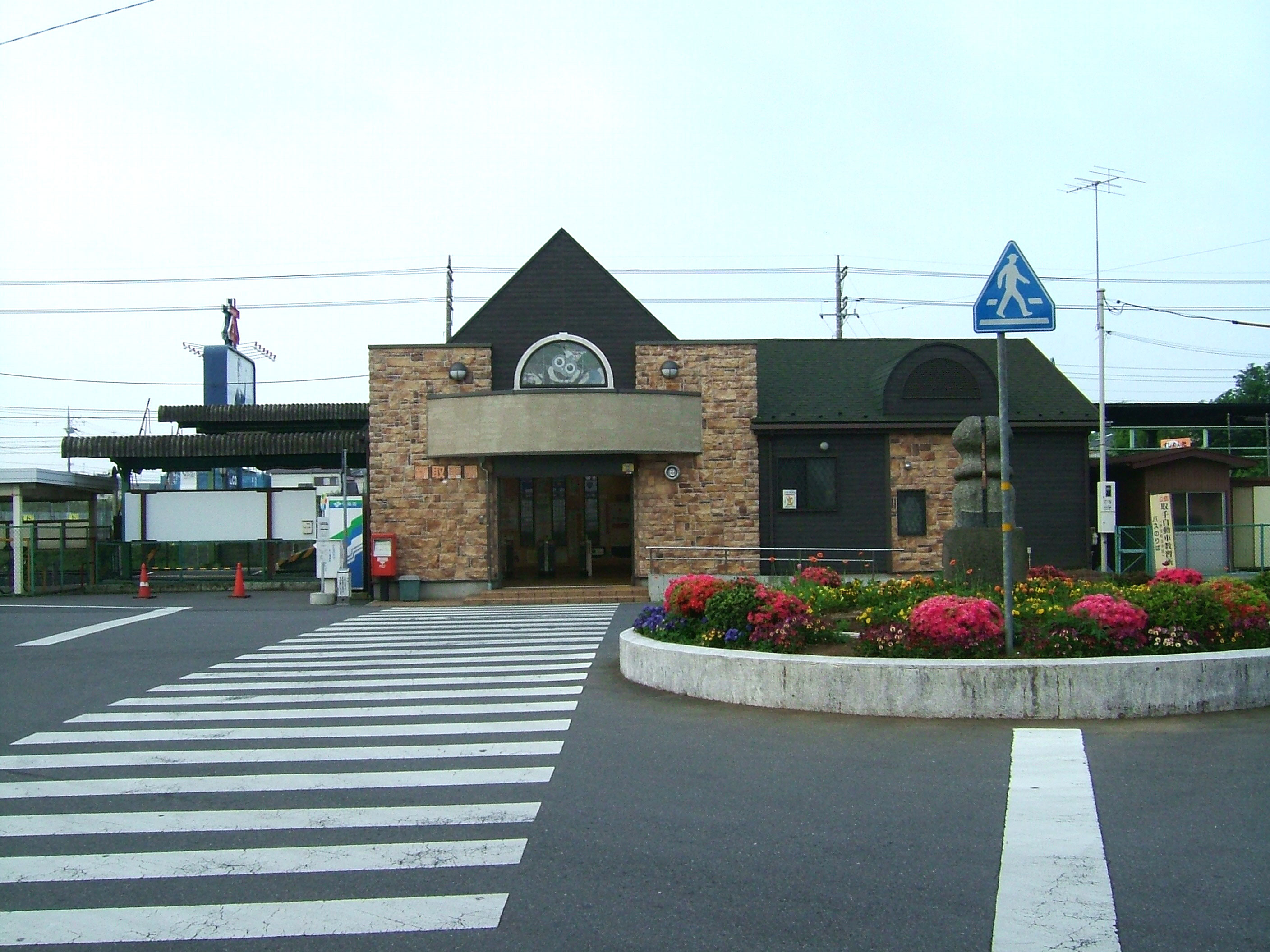
- Shin-Toride Station, May 2008

General information
- Location: Shin-Toride 1-1-1, Toride-shi, Ibaraki-ken 302-0031; Japan
- Coordinates: 35.9176°N 140.0419°E
- Operator: Kantō Railway
- Line: ■ Jōsō Line
- Distance: 3.4 km from Toride
- Platforms: 1 island platform

Other information
- Status: Unstaffed
- Website: Official website

History
- Opened: 1 April 1968; 58 years ago

Passengers
- FY2018: 2008

Services
Preceding station	Kantō Railway	Following station
Terahara towards Toride	Jōsō Line Rapid; Local	Yumemino towards Shimodate
Location
- Location within Ibaraki Prefecture Location within Japan

Shin-Toride Station (新取手駅, Shin-Toride-eki) is a passenger railway station in the city of Toride, Ibaraki Prefecture, Japan operated by the private railway company Kantō Railway.

== Lines ==
Shin-Toride Station is a station on the Jōsō Line, and is 3.4 km (2.1 mi) from the official starting point of the line at Toride Station.

== Station layout ==
The station consists of a single island platform, connected to the station building by a level crossing. The station is unattended.

=== Platforms ===
1	■ Jōsō Line	for Toride
2	■ Jōsō Line	for Shimodate

== History ==
Shin-Toride Station was opened on 1 April 1968.

== Passenger statistics ==
In fiscal 2018, the station was used by an average of 2008 passengers daily (boarding passengers only).

== Surrounding area ==
- Toride-Terada Post Office

== See also ==
- List of railway stations in Japan
