= Jun Sadogawa =

Japanese manga artist (1979-2013)

- Born: Mutsumi Kawato; 1979; Tone, Ibaraki, Japan
- Died: August 13, 2013 (aged 34); Tone, Ibaraki, Japan
- Occupation: Manga artist
- Known for: Muteki Kanban Musume

Mutsumi Kawato (川人 睦, Kawato Mutsumi; 1979 – August 13, 2013), better known by his pen name Jun Sadogawa (佐渡川 準, Sadogawa Jun), was a Japanese manga artist from Tone, Ibaraki, Japan. His debut work Muteki Kanban Musume was published from 2002 to 2006. Sadogawa committed suicide by hanging on August 13, 2013, at age 34. He was serializing his manga Amane Atatameru at the time of his death.

== Life Time ==
In 2000, he won the 55th Newcomer Manga Award and made her serial debut with " Muteki Kanban Musume " serialized in " Weekly Shonen Champion " (Akita Shoten ). He also illustrated the column "Dream of the Wrinkles of the World!" serialized in "Young Champion" (Akita Shoten). On the Internet, He was active under the handle name "Furiru Fujin."

Of the 17 volumes of "Muteki Kanban Musume," volumes 1 to 16 introduce his profile, including his " registered domicile - the southern tip of Ibaraki Prefecture (Tone Town)," "favorite insects ," and " body fat percentage ." He is also a karateka, and in the comments at the end of the "Champion" magazine he made a statement alluding to the fact that he came second in a tournament despite being a manga artist, and on the cover of the first volume of the initial publication there was a comment from karateka Nobuaki Kakuta . A fan who met him said that his physique "is like a school gym teacher, and he doesn't look like a manga artist at all.

== Works ==
- Muteki Kanban Musume (無敵看板娘) (2002–2006, 17 volumes)
- Muteki Kanban Musume N (無敵看板娘N) (2006–2007, 5 volumes)
- Punisher (2008–2009, 7 volumes)
- Hanzasky (ハンザスカイ) (2010–2012, 13 volumes)
- Amane Atatameru (あまねあたためる) (2012–2013, 2 volumes, unfinished)
