= Muteki Kanban Musume =

Japanese manga and anime series

- Cover of the first volume

無敵看板娘
- Genre: Comedy
- Manga

Noodle Fighter Miki
- Written by: Jun Sadogawa
- Published by: Akita Shoten
- English publisher: NA: ADV Manga
- Magazine: Weekly Shōnen Champion
- Original run: May 16, 2002 – February 23, 2006
- Volumes: 17
- Manga

Muteki Kanban Musume N
- Written by: Jun Sadogawa
- Published by: Akita Shoten
- Magazine: Weekly Shōnen Champion
- Original run: March 16, 2006 – April 26, 2007
- Volumes: 5
- Anime television series

Ramen Fighter Miki
- Directed by: Nobuo Tomisawa
- Produced by: Takaya Ibira; Kōhei Kawase; Shinichi Ikeda; Tomoyuki Saitō; Tetsurō Satomi
- Written by: Touko Machida
- Music by: Ryūji Takagi
- Studio: Telecom Animation Film
- Licensed by: NA: Anime Works
- Original network: Chiba TV, TV Kanagawa, TV Saitama, Yomiuri TV
- English network: US: Toku
- Original run: July 4, 2006 – September 19, 2006
- Episodes: 12 (24 segments)
- icon

Muteki Kanban Musume (Japanese: 無敵看板娘; "The Unbeatable Signboard Girl") is a Japanese manga series written and illustrated by Jun Sadogawa. It was serialized between May 2002 and February 2006 in Akita Shoten's Weekly Shōnen Champion and was collected in 17 volumes. A continuation titled Muteki Kanban Musume N was serialized in Weekly Shōnen Champion between March 2006 and April 2007 and was collected in five volumes. A 12-episode anime television series adaptation animated by Telecom Animation Film aired in Japan between July and September 2006. The original manga was licensed in North America as Noodle Fighter Miki, and the anime was licensed in North America as Ramen Fighter Miki. The series premiered on Toku in the United States in January 2016.

== Plot ==
Muteki Kanban Musume is a comedy detailing the adventures of Miki Onimaru, a girl who recently turned 20, whose mother runs a Chinese ramen restaurant. Miki works as the delivery girl for the shop but frequently gets into trouble due to her boisterous, active personality. Much of the humor of the series derives from the characters' over-the-top behavior.

== Characters ==
Miki Onimaru (鬼丸 美輝, Onimaru Miki)
Voiced by: Hitomi Nabatame
Miki is the new delivery girl for the Onimaru family ramen shop. She is 20 years old, but has the maturity of a 12-year-old child, with a corresponding energy and fiercely competitive personality that makes her stand out. She often starts physical fights and competitions; her physical strength is admired in the series, and her fighting style is frantic and unpredictable. Violent as she may be, Miki is a caring and kind-hearted girl who is keen to help anyone in need. This sweet-gentleness comes to the forefront when she is drunk, turning her from a crude tomboy to the very portrait of an ideal Japanese lady.
Megumi Kannazuki (神無月めぐみ, Kannazuki Megumi)
Voiced by: Ami Koshimizu
Megumi is Miki's long-time rival and the delivery girl for the bakery directly across the street from Onimaru. They went through school at the same time. Like Miki, she is committed to being the best, but often falls short to the other girl's antics. Megumi specializes in throwing sharpened bamboo skewers like darts. While Megumi often claims to be ruthlessly bullied by Miki, her own behavior is by no means innocent, and she often sets traps for Onimaru. She can also be fundamentally kind-hearted like Miki, particularly when it comes to matters of helping children in need. In contrast to Miki, Megumi becomes a crude and violent tomboy when drunk.
Makiko Onimaru (鬼丸真紀子, Onimaru Makiko)
Voiced by: Sayuri Sadaoka
Makiko is practical and down-to-earth. As Miki's mother, she genuinely cares about the girl, but can be quite harsh with her, taking out her anger on Miki through slapstick violence. As she has Miki deliver ramen, Makiko's mantra is "Deliveries are about speed!" When she is drunk, she turns into a kung-fu master.
Akihiko Ohta (太田 明彦, Ohta Akihiko)
Voiced by: Yuichi Nakamura
Akihiko is the owner of the grocery store next door to Onimaru. He spends a good amount of his free time at the ramen shop with Miki's mother. He views his Miki's goings-on with bemusement, but accepts that that's the way she is. Ohta is a huge fan of Super Space Battle Team Star Rangers (an in-universe superhero show similar to Super Sentai). He is also a skilled graffiti artist.
Kankuro Nishiyama (西山勘九郎, Nishiyama Kankuro)
Voiced by: Nobuyuki Hiyama
Kankuro is a college graduate who's returned to the town at the beginning of the series. He holds a grudge against Miki because she used to bully him, despite being younger than him. Kankuro is somewhat thickheaded, and often fails to take Miki's resourcefulness into account when he schemes against her. He almost always adds "nya" at the end of his sentences. He is poor and does odd jobs in order to support himself. What adds to Kankuro's hate towards Miki is the fact that Miki can never remember his name.
Tomoka Kayahara (茅原 智香, Kayahara Tomoka)
Voiced by: Kaori Mine
Tomoka is a teacher at the local high school. She is greatly feared by students, because of her creepy appearance and depressing air. She dislikes her job because of the pressure she has to put on students. The show makes visual references to Sadako Yamamura when Miki, Akihiko, and Megumi first meet her. When she eats ramen, Tomoka becomes cute, and her creepy aura disappears. Megumi doesn't know Tomoka's true identity, and believes she is a vengeful ghost. It is also shown that she can climb up walls like a gekko.
Toshiyuki (敏行)
Voiced by: Rokurō Naya
Toshiyuki is a vicious dog that lives in town, and Miki's strongest non-human opponent. Miki seems to understand its growls and barks, and says it claims to bite people for the sake of world peace. Later on he becomes friends with Kankuro. In the anime adaptation, Toshiyuki appears in every episode's end credits.
Wakana Endou (遠藤若菜, Endou Wakana)
Voiced by: Saki Nakajima
Toshiyuki's young owner. She is not threatened by her dog, who is harmless around her.
Hell's Bunny
The Star Rangers' strongest foe. Depicted as an attractive woman in a long dress and partial rabbit costume, she wields a large wooden mallet and displays excellent attack skills.
Pink Star
A member of Chokukan Sentai Star Rangers, and a friend of the actress that plays Hell's Bunny. Before meeting Miki, she was not used to using too much force. Later she gained confidence due to Miki's behavior and began using more strength when using her character's special knee attack.

== Media ==
=== Manga ===
Muteki Kanban Musume is a manga series written and illustrated by Jun Sadogawa. It was serialized in Akita Shoten's Weekly Shōnen Champion from the 25th issue of 2002 to the 13th issue of 2006, sold between May 16, 2002, and February 23, 2006. It was collected in 17 tankōbon volumes published between November 14, 2002, and June 8, 2006. The manga was licensed for release in North America by ADV Manga under the title Noodle Fighter Miki. A sequel titled Muteki Kanban Musume N was serialized in Weekly Shōnen Champion from the 16th issue of 2006 to the combined 22nd/23rd issue of 2007, sold between March 16, 2006, and April 26, 2007. It was collected in five tankōbon volumes published between July 7, 2006, and July 6, 2007.

=== Anime ===
A 12-episode anime television series adaptation, animated by Telecom Animation Film, directed by Nobuo Tomizawa, and written by Touko Machida aired in Japan between July 4 and September 19, 2006, on Chiba TV. The anime was licensed for release in North America by Anime Works under the title Ramen Fighter Miki. The series premiered on Toku in the United States in January 2016. The opening theme is "Wild Spice" by Masami Okui and the ending theme is "Muteki na Smile" (無敵なsmile; "Invincible Smile") by Naozumi Takahashi.

==== Episode list ====
No.	Title	Original release date
1	"Invincible Delivery Girl / Another Delivery Girl" "Muteki Kanban Musume / Mō Hitori no Kanban Musume" (無敵看板娘 / もうひとりの看板娘)	July 4, 2006
Miki, Megumi, Makiko, and Akihiko are introduced. Miki demonstrates her willingness to slack off from work in order to help others. Miki and Megumi face off.
2	"Challenger - Nishiyama Kankuro / Our Fight Isn't Over Yet" "Chōsen-sha·Nishiyama Kankurō / Waga Tatakai ni Shūten Nashi" (挑戦者·西山勘九郎 / 我が戦いに終点なし)	July 11, 2006
Kankuro is introduced. He tries to get revenge for the bullying Miki did to him, without success.
3	"An Impervious Enemy / Wanting to Wipe the Tears from that Child" "Katsumei Nai Kyōteki / Ano Ko no Namida o Nuguitai" (かつてない強敵 / あの子の涙をぬぐいたい)	July 18, 2006
Toshiyuki is introduced. Miki and Megumi spar with him. When Toshiyuki gets lost, everybody looks for him, but they are unaware of his name and think they are looking for Wakana's brother instead.
4	"Before the Trip Starts / Let Me Guide You" "Tabidachi no Mae ni / Watashi ga Anata o Michibikimashou" (旅立ちの前に / 私があなたを導きましょう)	July 25, 2006
Tomoka is introduced. Miki helps the teacher with her self-consciousness problem, and they persuade a delinquent to return to school. Megumi mistakes Tomoka for an angry ghost.
5	"Let's See Who Must Win / You're My Stepping Stone!!" "Shirokuro Tsukeyou ze / Fumidai wa Omae da!!" (白黒つけようぜ / 踏み台はお前だ!!)	August 2, 2006
Miki and Megumi fight over a pig plush toy. A "facial sumo" contest takes place. Miki and Megumi get stuck in a closed-off alley; with Kankuro, Akihiko, and Toshiyuki, they fight to see who will use the others' bodies as a ramp to reach a ladder.
6	"Fight! Bark Bark vs. Nya Nya / The Rift That Looked Like Red String" "Taiketsu! Wan Wan VS Nyā Nyā / Akai Ito ni Mieta Mizu" (対決!ワンワンVSニャーニャー / 赤い糸に見えた溝)	August 9, 2006
Kankuro tries to fight Toshiyuki in order to train against Miki. Wakana thinks Kankuro's constant challenges to Miki are a sign of hidden love.
7	"Peel Off the Fake Smile / Sneaking In! The Demon's Nest" "Hiki Hagase Itsuwari no Egao / Sen'nyū! Oni no Su" (ひきはがせ偽りの笑顔 / 潜入!鬼の巣)	August 16, 2006
Miki's attempt to expose Megumi's evil inner personality backfires. Megumi finds out that the Onimaru shop is so popular at lunch because everyone comes to see Miki fight.
8	"That Guy Sure Looks Like He's the Strongest / A Bad Guy is Coming" "Tashika ni Yatsu wa Saikyō ni Mieta / Warumono ga Yattekita" (確かに奴は最強に見えた / 悪者がやってきた)	August 22, 2006
Miki helps Akihiko get over his personal conflict over Hell's Bunny, the famous villain on Star Rangers. Megumi helps, too, by cosplaying as Hell's Bunny. She then uses the costume to attract attention to the bakery. A little girl gets "Hell's Bunny" to perform for her sickly brother in the hospital. When Miki shakes Megumi (as Hell's Bunny) unconscious, the group gets help from the real Hell's Bunny and Pink Star.
9	"A Falling Superstar / A Mother's Worry" "Ochi Kaketa Kyosei / Kangaeru Haha" (堕ちかけた巨星 / 考える母)	August 29, 2006
Miki, Megumi, and Kankuro try to find out if Makiko has any weaknesses at all. Makiko questions her method of disciplining Miki, and tries a different way of treating her daughter, much to Miki's displeasure.
10	"Work for the Win / Sudden Fight! Nishiyama Kankuro VS Kannazuki Megumi" "Hataraite Kachitore / Gekitotsu! Nishiyama Kankurō VS Kannazuki Megumi" (働いて勝ち取れ / 激突!西山勘九郎VS神無月めぐみ)	September 5, 2006
Kankuro works hard at the ramen shop while Miki makes deliveries, so that he can challenge her when she comes back. The two have a short competition to see who is the better poster girl. Kankuro and Megumi team up to fight Miki.
11	"The Guy Lets His Back Do the Talking / A Deadly Fight With a Happy Face" "Senaka de Kataru Aitsu / Kishoku Manmen Shitō" (背中で語るあいつ / 喜色満面死闘)	September 12, 2006
Toshiyuki allows people to ride on his back, though refuses to allow Miki unless it's for emergency situations. A Delivery Girl contest pits Miki and Megumi to compete against each other, as well as other female competitors.
12	"When You Were Smashed / The Buried Party" "Kimi ga Kowareta Toki / Hōmura reta Utage" (君が壊れた時 / 葬られた宴)	September 19, 2006
Miki drinks beer and gets drunk. In her drunk personality, she is very cute, shy and husband-looking girl. In the other episode, Megumi is also drunk, and becomes an abusive and violent tomboy. But after while, they (literally) knock the alcohol out of each other, and are back to their normal (but still violent) selves again.

== See also ==
- Cooking Master Boy
- Fighting Foodons
- Iron Wok Jan
- Yakitate!! Japan
