= Ina, Ibaraki =

Dissolved municipality in Ibaraki prefecture, Japan

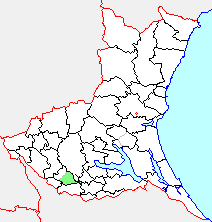
Map of Ina, Ibaraki

flag of Ina, Ibaraki

Ina (伊奈町, Ina-machi) was a town located in Tsukuba District, Ibaraki Prefecture, Japan.

As of 2003, the town had an estimated population of 25,037 and a density of 549.78 persons per km^{2}. The total area was 45.54 km^{2}.

On March 27, 2006, Ina, along with the village of Yawara (also from Tsukuba District), was merged to create the city of Tsukubamirai.
