= Lake Kasumigaura =

Second-largest lake in Japan

Lake Kasumigaura 霞ヶ浦
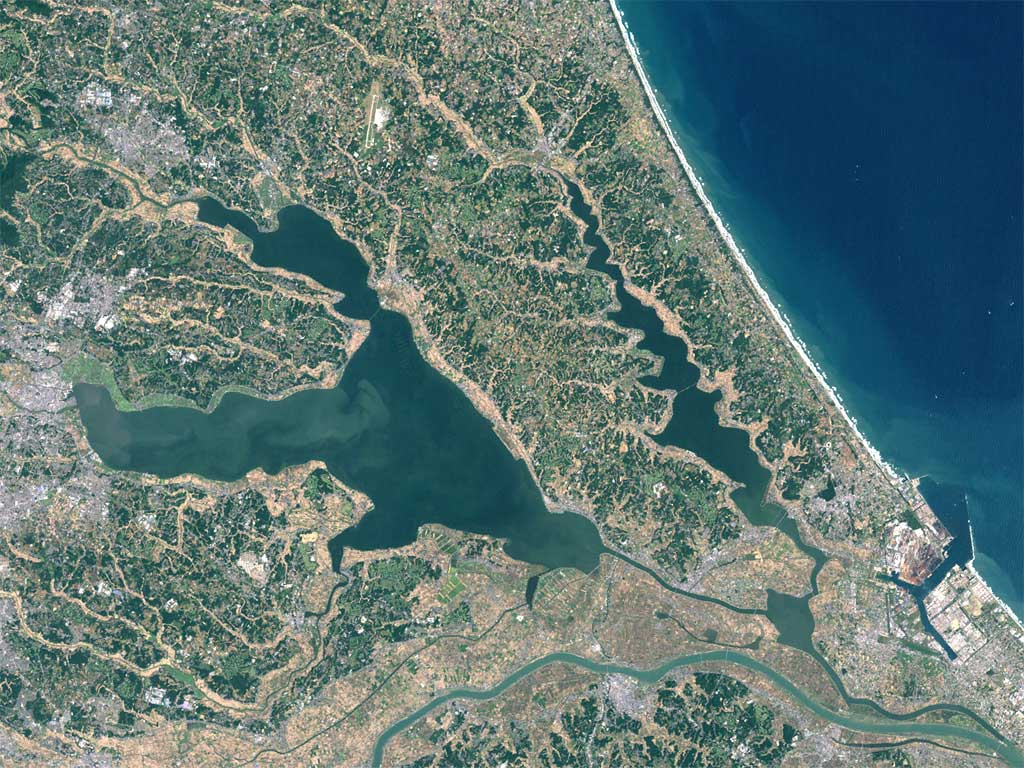
- The Landsat satellite picture of Lake Kasumigaura.

- Location within Japan
- Coordinates: 36°2′25″N 140°23′39″E
- Type: warm Monomictic
- Primary inflows: Sakura and Naka rivers and more than 30 small rivers
- Primary outflows: Tone River
- Catchment area: 1,915 km^{2} (739 sq mi)
- Basin countries: Japan
- Surface area: 220 km^{2} (85 sq mi)
- Average depth: 4 m (13 ft)
- Max. depth: 7 m (23 ft)
- Water volume: 0.848 km^{3} (687,000 acre⋅ft)
- Shore length^{1}: 252 km (157 mi)
- Surface elevation: 0.16 m (6.3 in)
- Islands: 0
- Settlements: Tsuchiura, Ibaraki; Kasumigaura, Ibaraki
- ^{1} Shore length is not a well-defined measure.

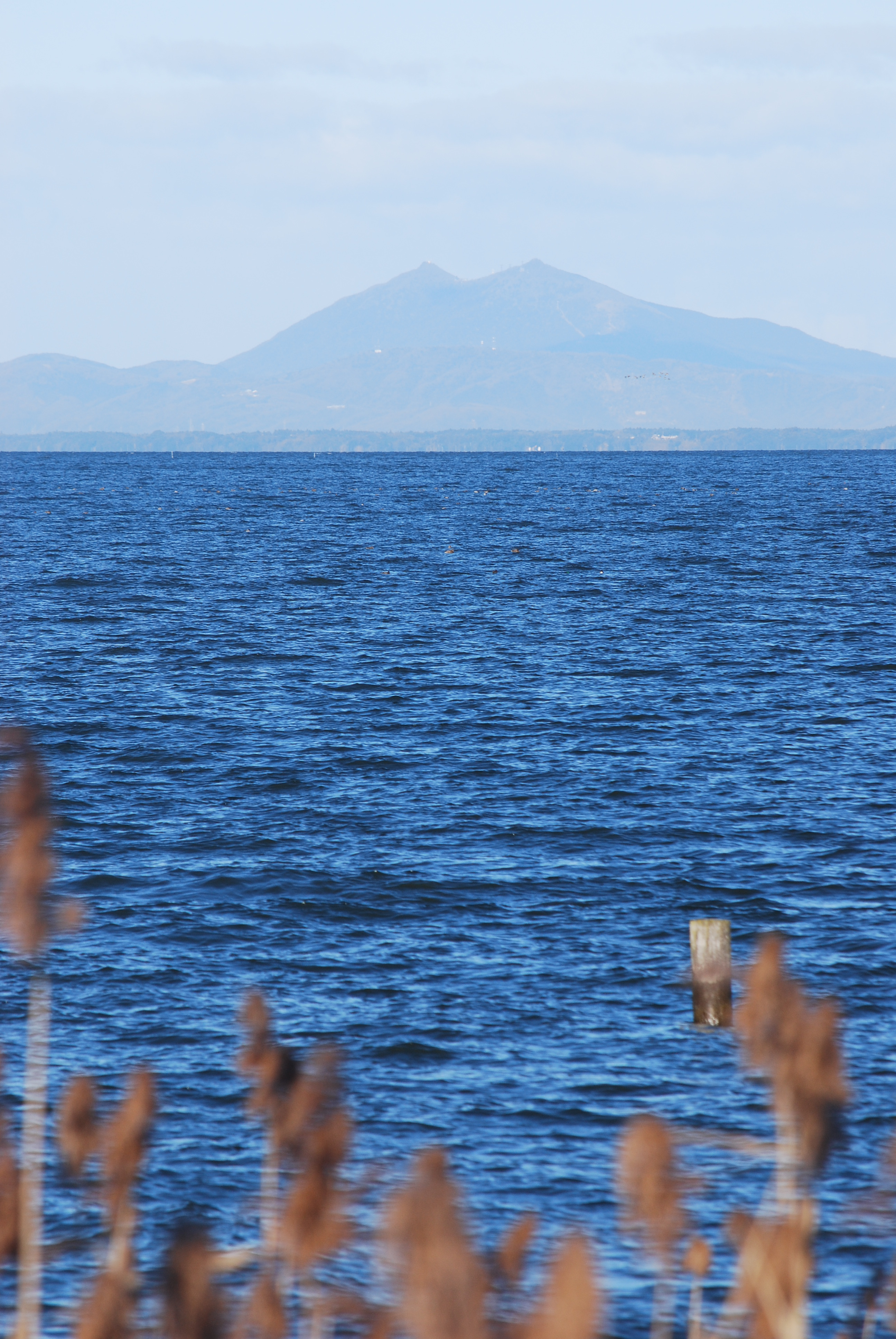
The lake and Mt. Tsukuba viewed from the east

Lake Kasumigaura (霞ヶ浦, Kasumigaura) is the second-largest lake in Japan, located 60 km to the north-east of Tokyo.

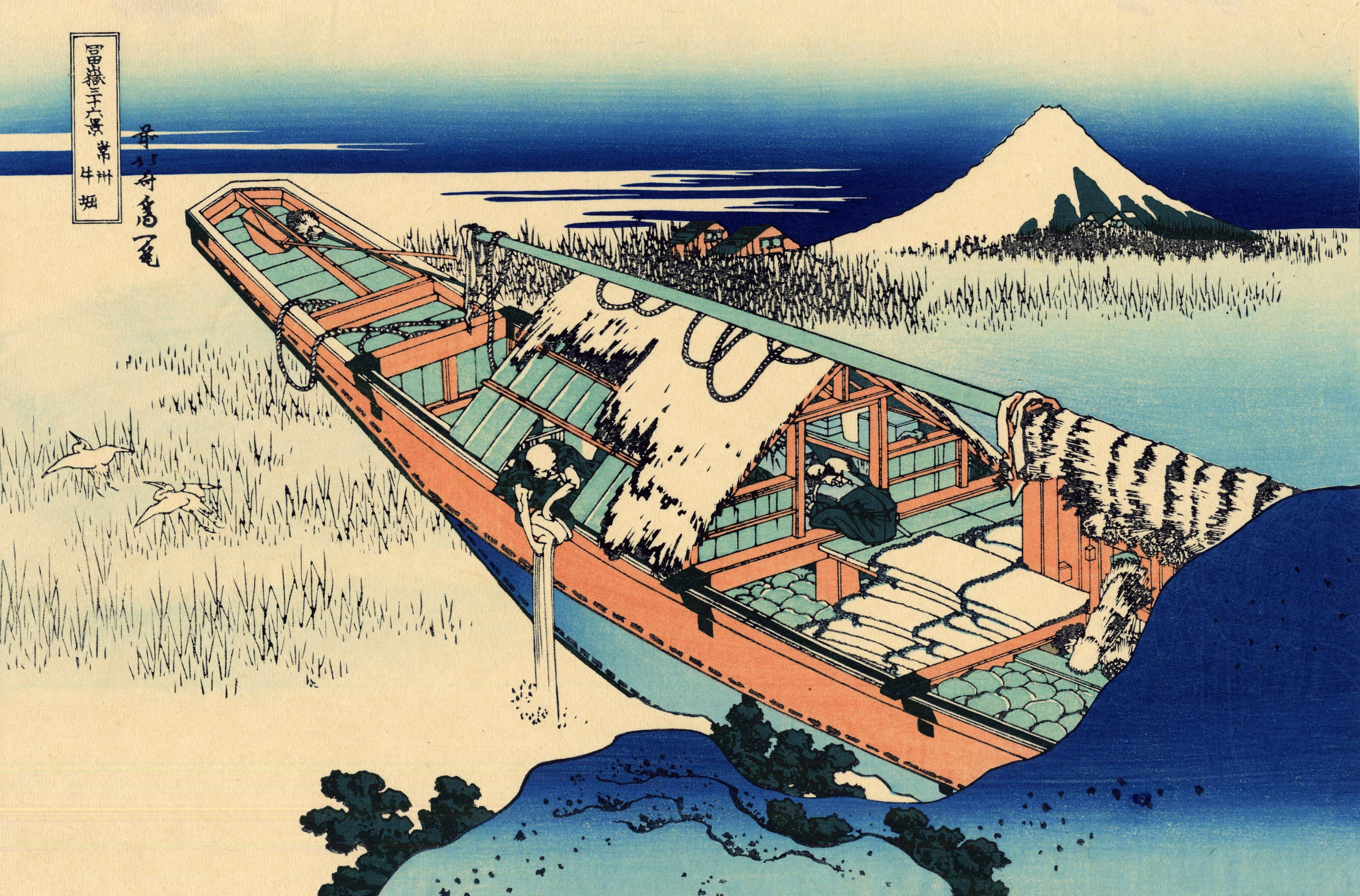
Hokusai

In a narrower sense and officially, Lake Kasumigaura refers to a waterbody with an area of 167.63 km^{2}. In a wider sense, Lake Kasumigaura can also refer to a group of contiguous lakes, which includes Lake Kasumigaura proper, hereby referred to as Nishiura (西浦), and two smaller lakes, Kitaura (北浦; 35.16 km^{2}) and Sotonasakaura (外浪逆浦; 5.85 km^{2}), and also encompasses the rivers connecting them. In this case the total area is 220 km^{2}.

About 45% of the land surrounding the lake is natural landscape and 43.5% is agricultural land.

== History ==
Lake Kasumigaura originally was a brackish-water lagoon, with indirect connections to the Pacific Ocean via the Hitachigawa and Tone Rivers. In 1963, the construction of a gate near the confluence of these rivers disconnected the lake from its sources of ocean water. As a result, the salinity of Lake Kasumigaura declined, and today the lake contains fresh water. This lake was famous for its traditional fishery during the Edo period. But today, fishing production has drastically decreased due to water quality deterioration that was partially caused by the closure of the tide gate in 1963 for purposes of desalination.

== Use ==
Today, Lake Kasumigaura is used for fishing, irrigation, tourism, recreation, and for consumption by the surrounding public and local industry.

A variety of fish can be caught from the waters of Lake Kasumigaura, including smelt, Japanese icefish, crucian carp, goby, Japanese eel and river prawn. The most popular catch is cultivated carp, followed by smelt and goby. Another cultivated treasure from Lake Kasumigaura is the beautiful Kasumi freshwater pearls. They were known for their high luster and rosy hues, which is the result of a four-year cultivation period. However, in 2006, cultivation was discontinued as cheap freshwater pearls from China proved too difficult to compete against.

The water from Lake Kasumigaura has long been used for the irrigation of paddy fields in the surrounding alluvial plain and upland fields on diluvial terraces covered by thick deposits of volcanic ash. The primary crops are rice and lotus root (a local speciality). Other crops include tomato, cucumber, eggplant, watermelon, corn, edamame, sweet potato, kabocha, daikon and peanut.

Many tourists come to the lake in the summer to view the Hobikibune (帆引き船) sailed fishing boats which are unique to Lake Kasumigaura. The Suigo aquapark, located in Tsuchiura, is popular during the hottest months. The windmill of Kasumigaura comprehensive park is a popular site along the shores throughout the year and especially in the spring when the tulips are flowering.

The lake is a recreation hotspot. Sport fishing enthusiasts and anglers can be found close to shore and around the river mouths surrounding the lake. Recreational boats, such as yachts, power boats, sail boats and personal watercraft, are regularly enjoyed on warm weekends. The wide surrounding wetlands are wonderful for birdwatching, as large numbers of water fowl can be observed, primarily during the wintering period. Japanese cormorant, Bewick’s swan, little egret, grey heron, mallard, Eurasian wigeon, striated heron, sharp-tailed sandpiper, bush warbler, wood sandpiper, marsh grassbird, Japanese reed bunting, and the Eurasian coot are a few of the birds seen around the lake.

Lake Kasumigaura provides over 60 tons of water per second; most goes to agriculture (83%). The rest is provided to local industry (13%) and public (4%) in the prefectures of Ibaraki, Chiba and Tokyo.

== Challenges ==
Eutrophication is a serious problem for Lake Kasumigaura. Legislation was enacted in 1982 to help prevent it, including a ban on the use and sale of phosphate-containing synthetic detergents, and the control of nitrogen and phosphorus contents in the effluent from factories.

In order to help maintain the lake, dredging work is being carried out around the lake and at the estuaries of main inflowing rivers, such as Sakura River (桜川).
