= Tsukubamirai =

Tsukubamirai つくばみらい市
- City
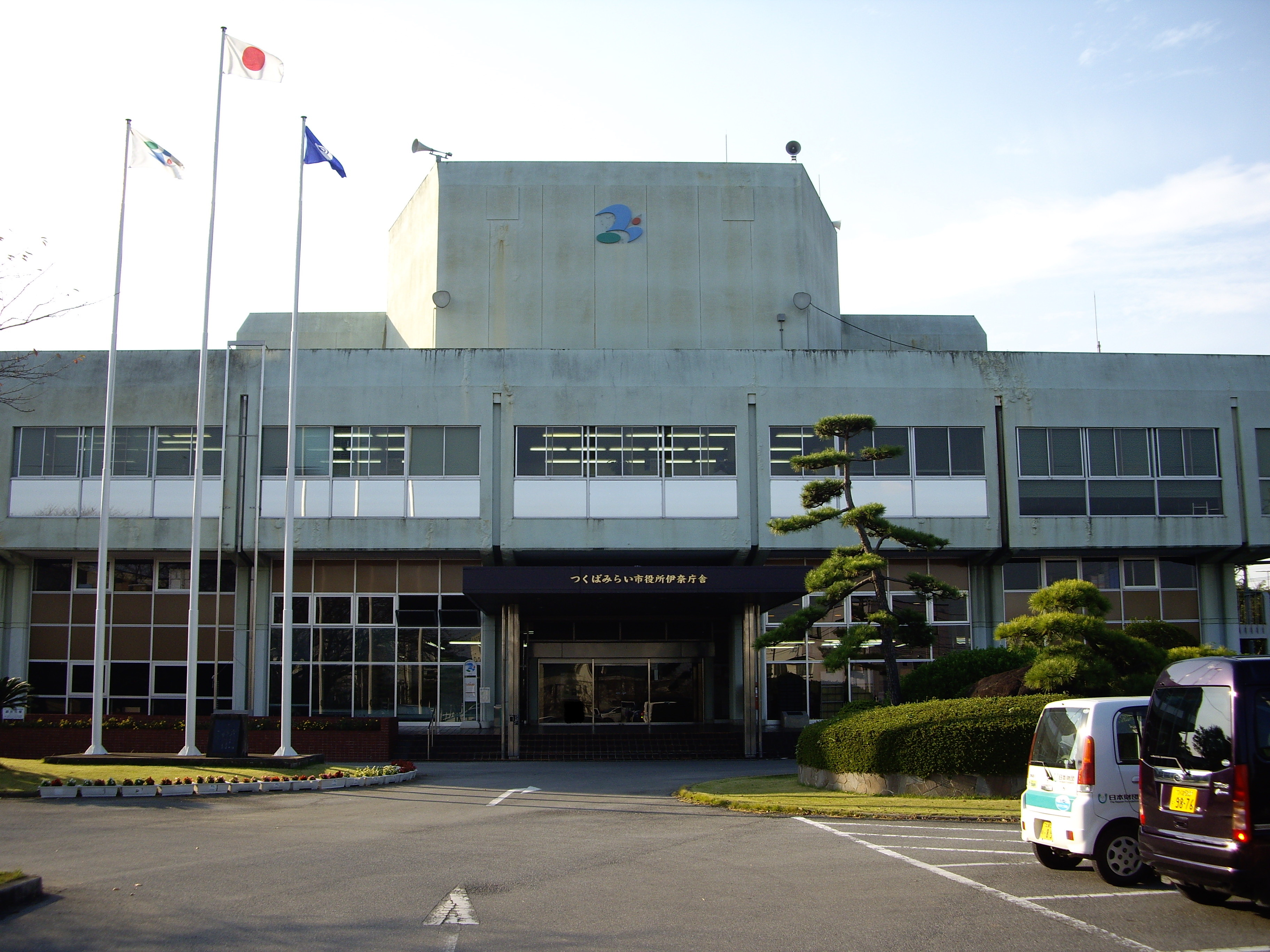
- Tsukubamirai city hall

- Flag Seal

- Location of Tsukubamirai in Ibaraki Prefecture

- Coordinates: 35°57′47″N 140°2′13.3″E
- Country: Japan
- Region: Kantō
- Prefecture: Ibaraki

Government
  - Mayor: Odagawa Hiroshi (since May 2018)

Area
  - Total: 79.16 km^{2} (30.56 sq mi)

Population (October 2020)
  - Total: 51,035
  - Density: 644.7/km^{2} (1,670/sq mi)
- Time zone: UTC+9 (Japan Standard Time)
- Tree: Sakura
- Flower: Brassica napus
- Bird: Eurasian skylark
- Phone number: 0297-58-2111
- Address: 195 Fukuda, Tsukubamirai-shi, Ibaraki-ken 300-2395
- Website: Official website

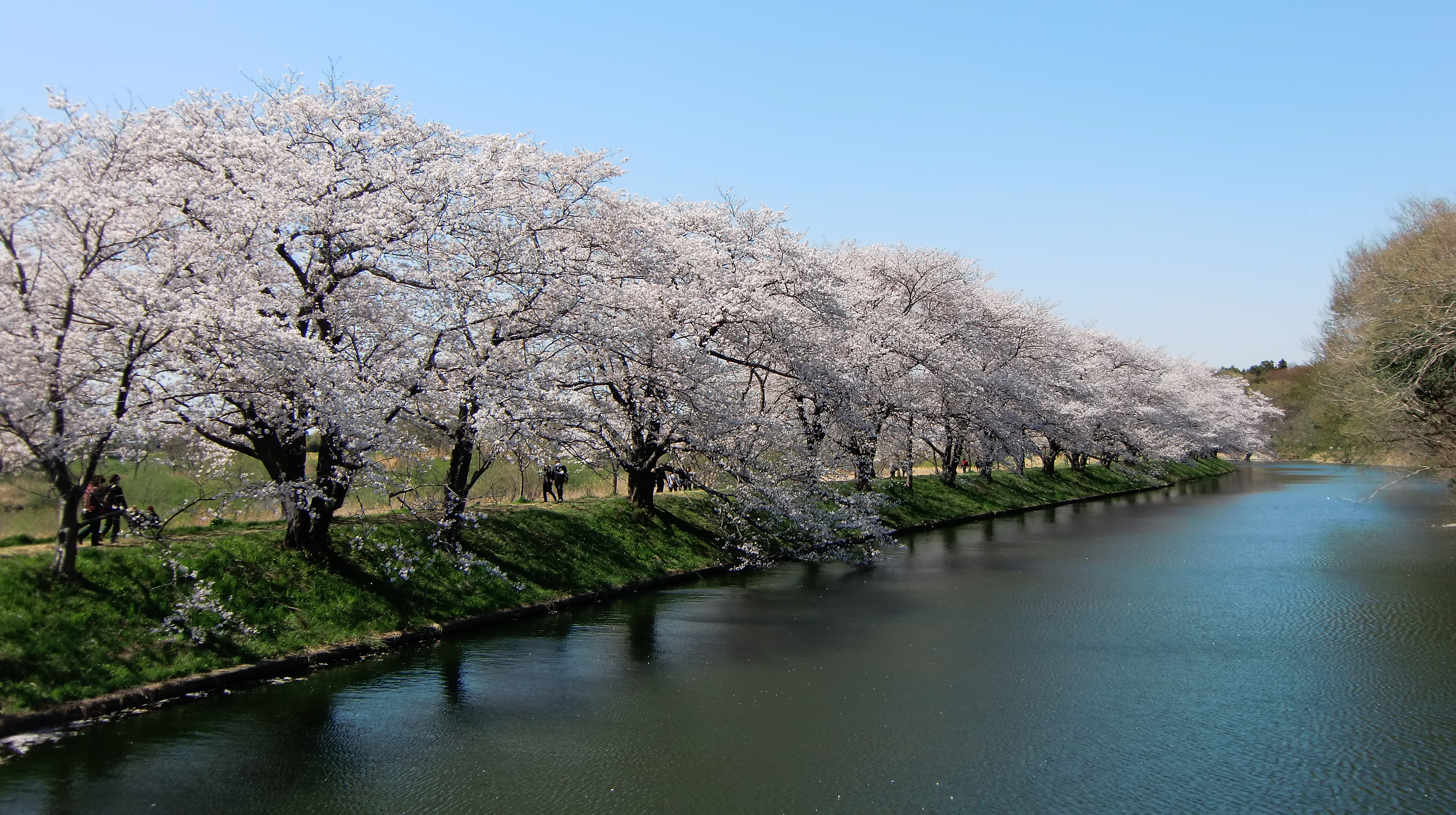
Sakura at Fukuoka Dam Park

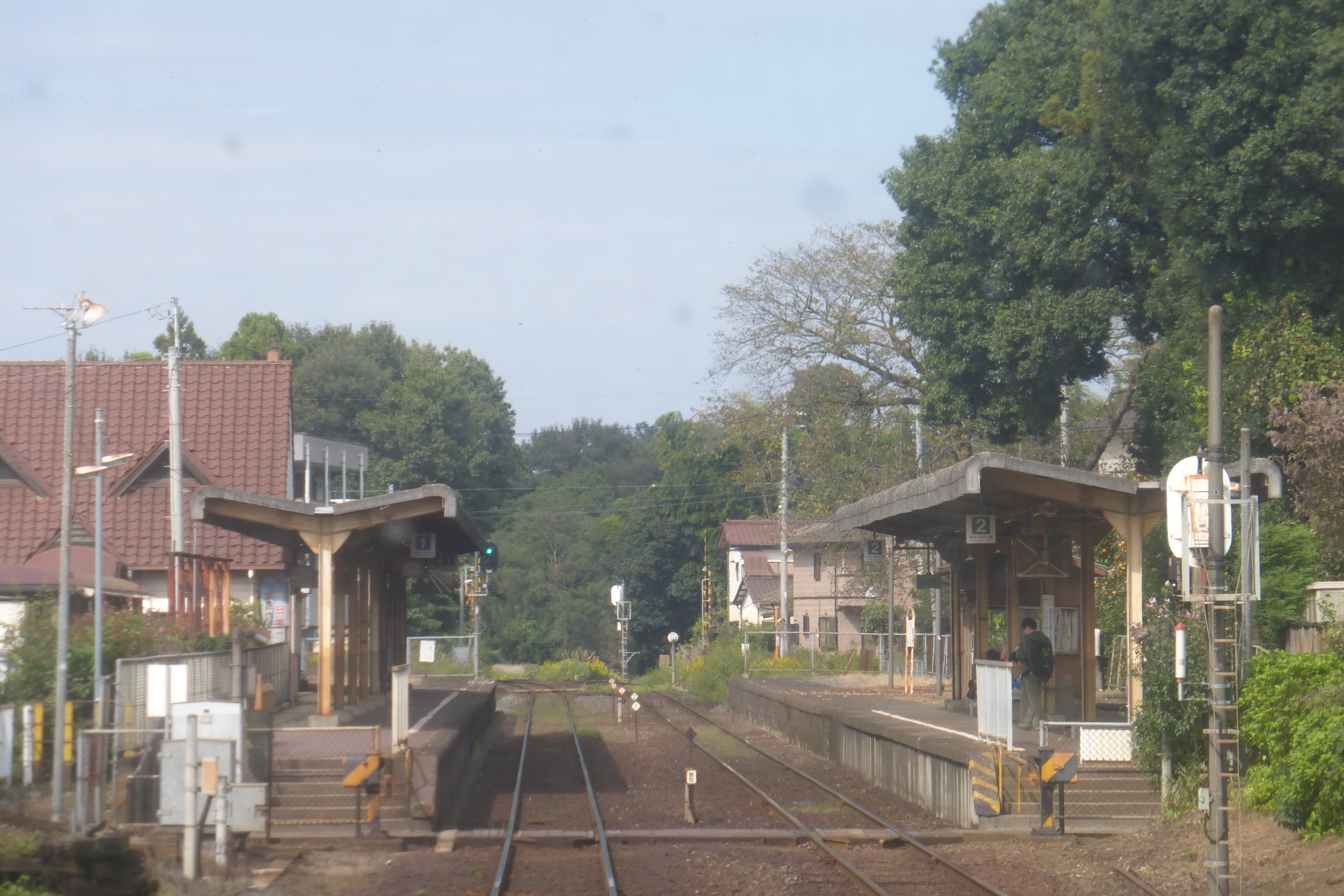
Kokinu Station

Tsukubamirai (つくばみらい市, Tsukubamirai-shi) is a city located in Ibaraki Prefecture, Japan. As of 1 October 2020, the city had an estimated population of 51,035 in 20,030 households and a population density of 645 persons per km^{2}. The percentage of the population aged over 65 was 26.3%. The total area of the city is 79.16 square kilometres (30.56 sq mi).

== Geography ==
Tsukubamirai is located in southern Ibaraki Prefecture, in the low-lying marshy flatlands south of Lake Kasumigaura. It is about 40 kilometers from central Tokyo. The elevation of the city is about 5 to 25 meters above sea level. The Kinugawa River and Kokaigawa rivers flow through the city. The eastern and western parts are hilly.

=== Surrounding municipalities ===
Ibaraki Prefecture

- Jōsō
- Moriya
- Ryūgasaki
- Toride
- Tsukuba

=== Climate ===
Tsukubamirai has a Humid continental climate (Köppen Cfa) characterized by warm summers and cool winters with light snowfall. The average annual temperature in Tsukubamirai is 14.1 °C. The average annual rainfall is 1299 mm with September as the wettest month. The temperatures are highest on average in August, at around 24.2 °C, and lowest in January, at around 2.9 °C.

== Demographics ==
Per Japanese census data, the population of Tsukubamirai has increased over the past 50 years.

Historical population
Year	Pop.	±%
1950	25,226	—
1960	22,756	−9.8%
1970	21,072	−7.4%
1980	32,917	+56.2%
1990	38,537	+17.1%
2000	40,532	+5.2%
2010	44,461	+9.7%
2020	49,872	+12.2%

== History ==
The area of Tsubakimarai was a rural region of Tsukuba District of Hitachi Province noted as a major rice-growing region, with the exception of a small portion in the south, which belonged to Kitasōma District of Shimōsa Province. The villages of Nagasaki and Kokinu, which were located north of the Tone River in Kitasōma District were transferred to the newly created Ibaraki Prefecture in 1875 and the region was organized into 11 villages with the establishment of the modern municipalities system on April 1, 1889.

The city of Tsukubamirai was established on March 27, 2006, from the merger of the town of Ina, and the village of Yawara (both from Tsukuba District).

== Government ==
Tsukubamirai has a mayor-council form of government with a directly elected mayor and a unicameral city council of 18 members. Tsukubamirai contributes one member to the Ibaraki Prefectural Assembly. In terms of national politics, the city is part of Ibaraki 6th district of the lower house of the Diet of Japan.

== Economy ==
Tsukubamirai was a purely agricultural area until large scale housing development began after the 1960s, and by the 1980s, with the opening of the Joban Expressway and several industrial parks, the area increasingly became a commuter town for the Tokyo Metropolis. This trend intensified after 2005 with the opening of the Tsukuba Express

== Education ==
Tsukubamirai has ten public elementary schools and four public middle schools operated by the city government, and one public high school operated by the Ibaraki Prefectural Board of Education.

== Transportation ==
=== Railway ===
Kantō Railway - Jōsō Line

- Kokinu

Metropolitan Intercity Railway Company - Tsukuba Express

- Miraidaira

=== Highway ===
- Jōban Expressway – Yawara Interchange
- National Route 294
- National Route 354

== Local attractions ==
- Fukuoka Dam
- Itabashi Fudouson temple
- Mamiya Rinzo Museum
- Tatsunami Sumo Stable
- Warp Station Edo
