= Miraidaira Station =

Railway station in Tsukubamirai, Ibaraki Prefecture, Japan

Miraidaira Station みらい平駅
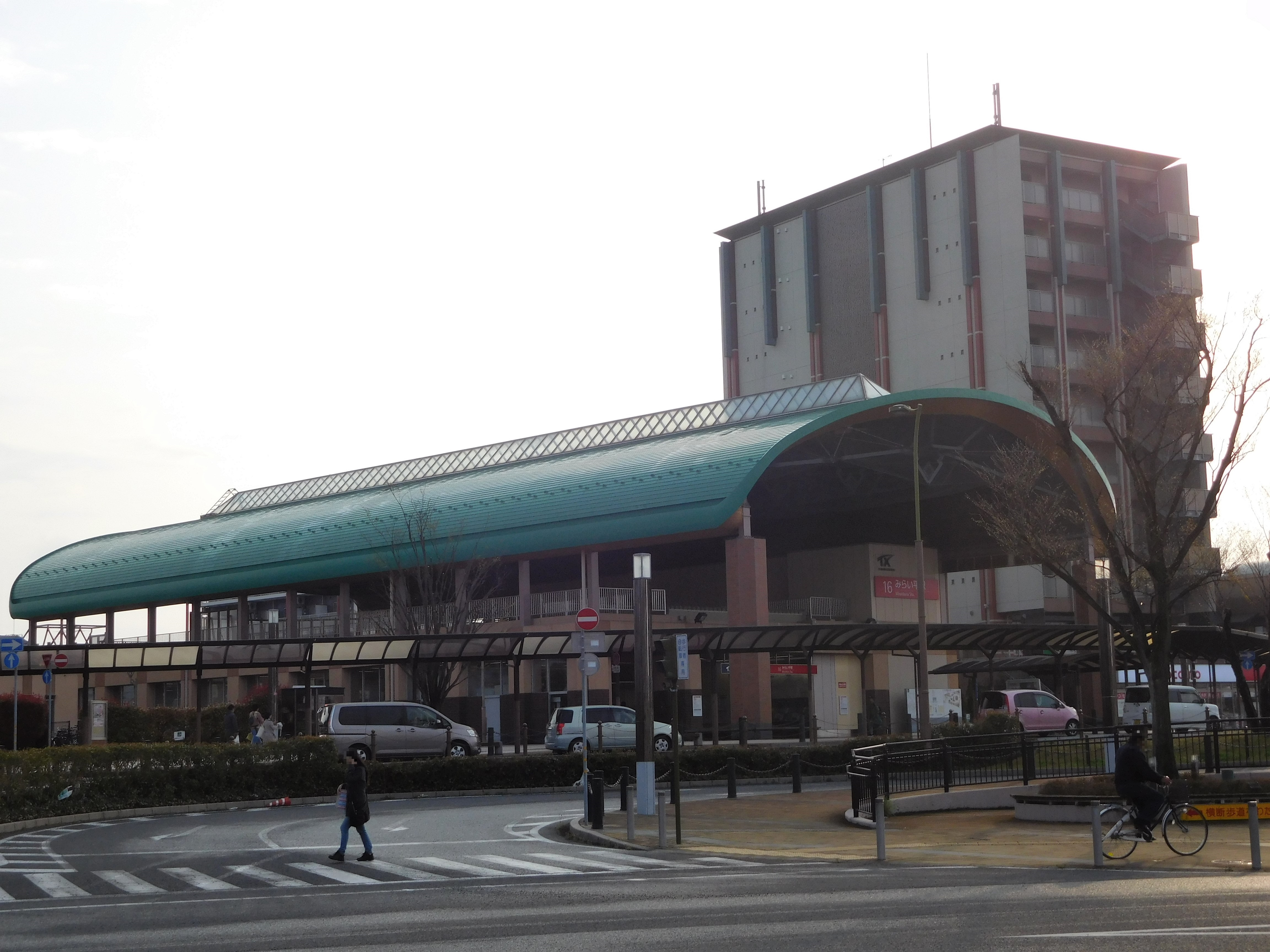
- Miraidaira Station in April 2017

General information
- Location: 1–5 Yōkōdai, Tsukubamirai-shi, Ibaraki-ken 300-2358; Japan
- Coordinates: 35°59′40.64″N 140°2′18.05″E
- Operator: Metropolitan Intercity Railway Company
- Line: Tsukuba Express
- Distance: 44.3 km from Akihabara
- Platforms: 2 (2 side platforms)
- Tracks: 2

Construction
- Structure type: Below-grade
- Accessible: Yes

Other information
- Status: Staffed
- Station code: TX16
- Website: Official website

History
- Opened: 24 August 2005

Passengers
- FY2019: 5479 daily

Services
Preceding station	Tsukuba Express	Following station
Moriya (TX15) towards Akihabara	Tsukuba Express Semi-Rapid Local	Midorino (TX17) towards Tsukuba
Location
- Location within Ibaraki Prefecture Location within Japan

Miraidaira Station (みらい平駅, Miraidaira-eki) is a passenger railway station in the city of Tsukubamirai, Ibaraki Prefecture, Japan, operated by the third-sector railway operating company Metropolitan Intercity Railway Company. Its station number is TX16.

== Lines ==
Miraidaira Station is served by the 58.3 km (36.2 mi) Tsukuba Express line from Akihabara in Tokyo to Tsukuba in Ibaraki Prefecture, and lies 44.3 km (27.5 mi) from the Tokyo terminus of the line at Akihabara. Only "Semi Rapid" and all-stations "Local" services stop at this station.

== Station layout ==
The station consists of two side platforms serving two tracks situated on the first basement ("B1F") level.

=== Platforms ===
1	■ Tsukuba Express	for Tsukuba
2	■ Tsukuba Express	for Akihabara

== History ==
The station opened on 24 August 2005, coinciding with the opening of the Tsukuba Express line.

== Passenger statistics ==
In fiscal 2019, the station was used by an average of 5479 passengers daily (boarding passengers only).

== Bus services ==
The station is served by buses operated by Kantō Railway and also Mirai community buses operated by Tsukubamirai.

== See also ==
- List of railway stations in Japan
