= Toride =

Toride 取手市
- City
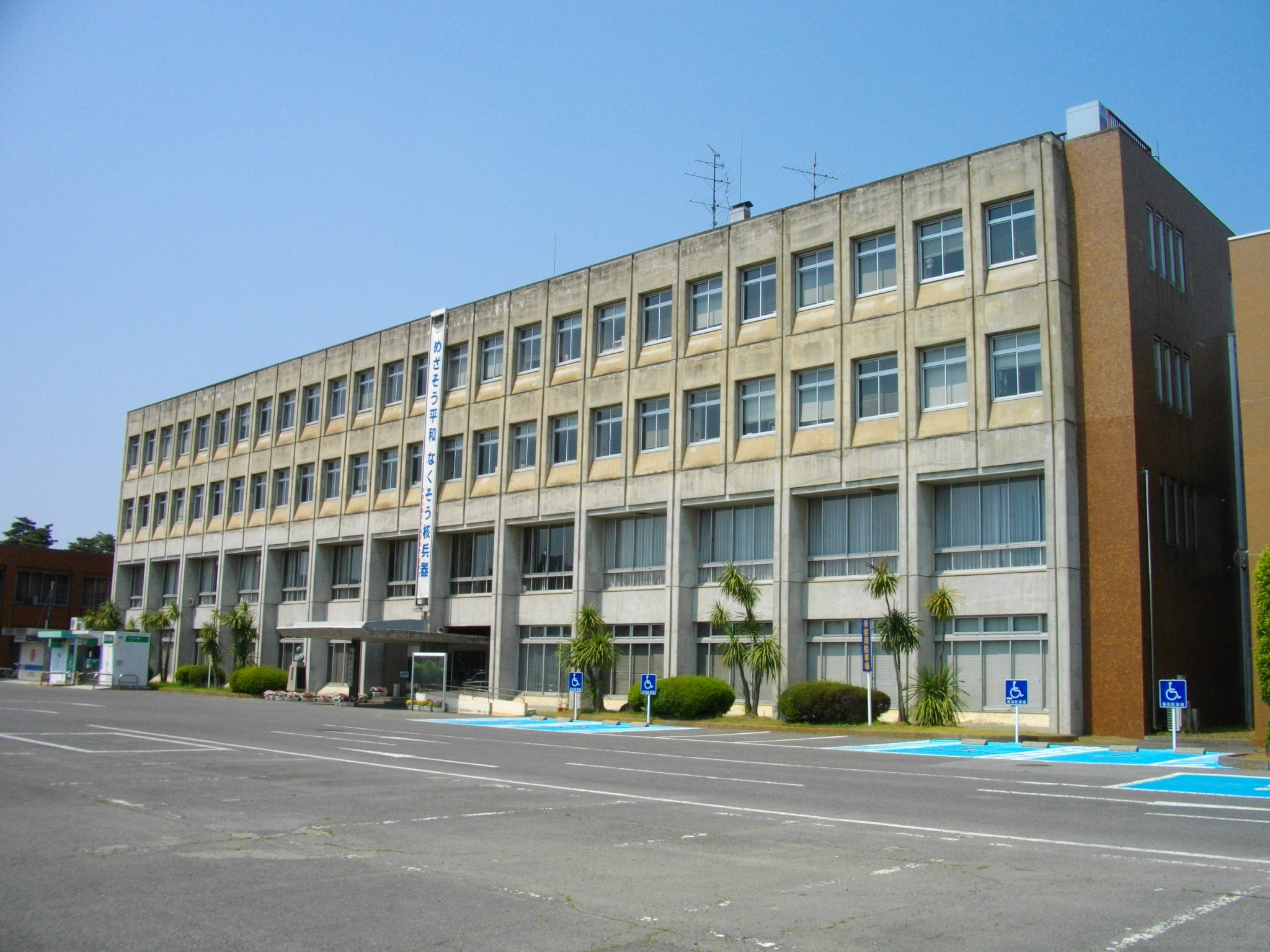
- Toride city hall

- Flag Seal

- Location of Toride in Ibaraki Prefecture

- Coordinates: 35°54′41.4″N 140°3′1.3″E
- Country: Japan
- Region: Kantō
- Prefecture: Ibaraki Prefecture

Government
  - Mayor: Osamu Nakamura (since 2023)

Area
  - Total: 69.94 km^{2} (27.00 sq mi)

Population (January 2024)
  - Total: 103,717
  - Density: 1,483/km^{2} (3,841/sq mi)
- Time zone: UTC+9 (Japan Standard Time)
- Tree: Osmanthus and Bay laurel
- Flower: Azalea and Wisteria
- Bird: Ural owl and Common kingfisher
- Phone number: 0297-74-2141
- Address: 5139 Terada, Toride-shi, Ibaraki-ken 302-8585
- Website: Official website

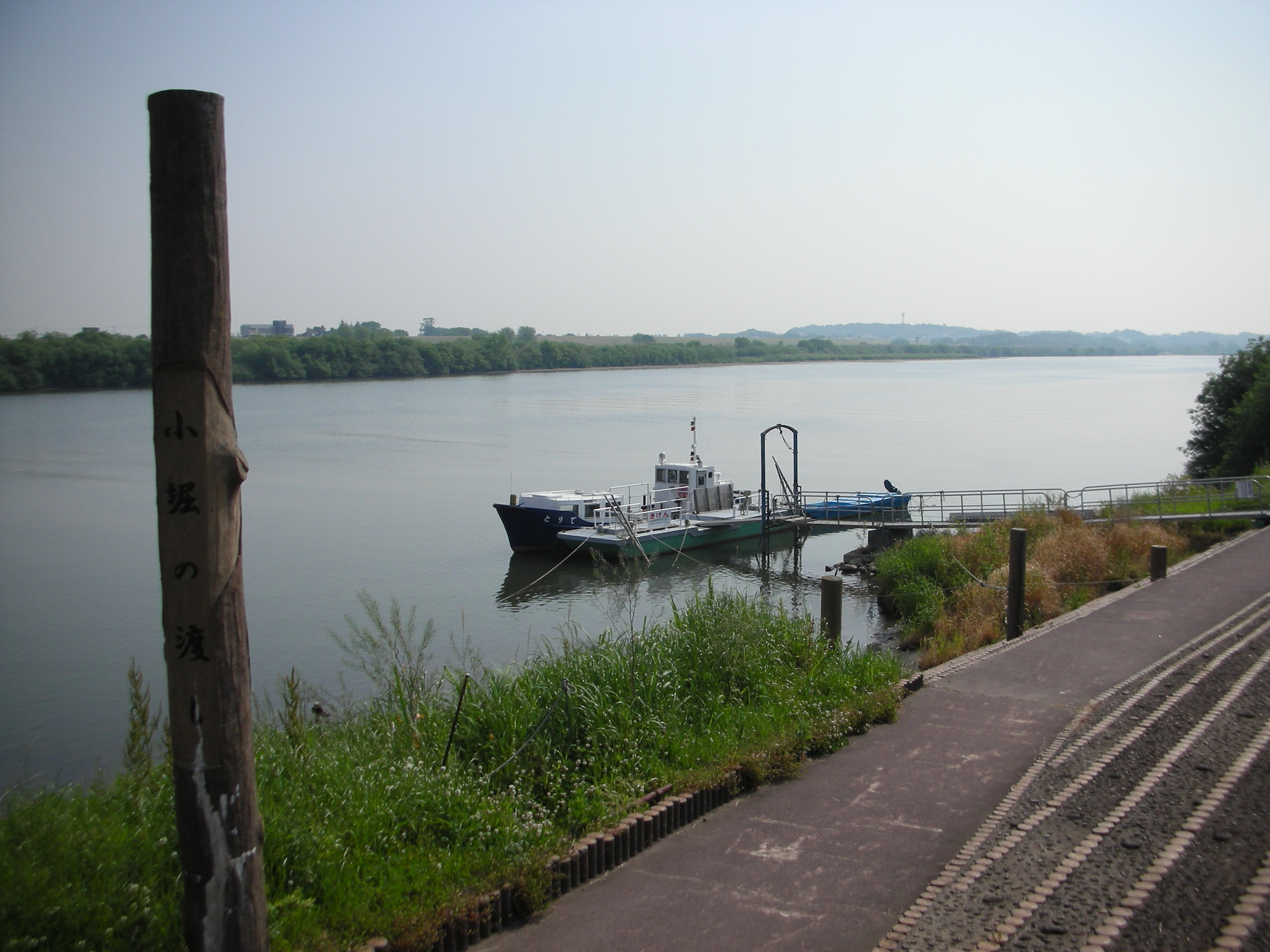
Ohori-no-watashi

Toride (取手市, Toride-shi) is a city located in Ibaraki Prefecture, Japan. As of 1 January 2024, the city had an estimated population of 103,717 in 47,545 households and a population density of 1482 persons per km^{2}. The percentage of the population aged over 65 was 34.8%. The total area of the city is 69.94 square kilometres (27.00 sq mi).

== Geography ==
Located in southern Ibaraki Prefecture, Toride is bordered by Chiba Prefecture to the south. The Tone River passes along the southern border of Toride, which also marks the Ibaraki/Chiba border. The city is located in the Kanto Plain and was often subject to flooding. It is approximately 40 kilometers from central Tokyo.

=== Surrounding municipalities ===
Chiba Prefecture

- Abiko
- Kashiwa

Ibaraki Prefecture

- Moriya
- Ryūgasaki
- Tone
- Tsukubamirai

=== Climate ===
Toride has a Humid continental climate (Köppen Cfa) characterized by warm summers and cool winters with light snowfall. The average annual temperature in Toride is 14.4 °C. The average annual rainfall is 1320 mm with September as the wettest month. The temperatures are highest on average in August, at around 24.6 °C, and lowest in January, at around 3.6 °C.

== Demographics ==
Per Japanese census data, the population of Toride peaked around the year 2000 and has declined slightly since.

Historical population
Year	Pop.	±%
1950	32,699	—
1960	35,188	+7.6%
1970	56,596	+60.8%
1980	97,715	+72.7%
1990	114,409	+17.1%
2000	115,993	+1.4%
2010	109,651	−5.5%
2020	104,524	−4.7%

== History ==
Toride developed in the Edo period as a post-town on the Mito Kaidō highway connecting Edo with Mito and as a nexus for water-borne traffic on the Tone River; however, the name is thought to derive from an ancient fort constructed by Taira no Masakado in the Heian period. The area was part of ancient Shimōsa Province, but was transferred to the newly created Ibaraki prefecture after the Meiji Restoration. Toride town was created with the establishment of the modern municipalities' system on April 1, 1889. It was elevated to city status on October 1, 1970. On March 28, 2005, the neighboring town of Fujishiro (from Kitasōma District) was merged into Toride, nearly doubling its size.

== Government ==
Toride has a mayor-council form of government with a directly elected mayor and a unicameral city council of 24 members. Toride contributes two members to the Ibaraki Prefectural Assembly. In terms of national politics, the city is part of Ibaraki 3rd district of the lower house of the Diet of Japan.

== Economy ==
Due to its proximity to Tokyo, Toride is increasingly a commuter town for the Tokyo Metropolis. Rice, sake, pickles and leeks dominate local agriculture.

== Education ==
Toride has 14 public elementary schools and six public middle schools operated by the city government, and five public high schools operated by the Ibaraki Prefectural Board of Education. In addition, there are one private elementary school, two private middle schools and two private high schools.

The Tokyo University of the Arts maintains a campus in Toride.

== Transportation ==
=== Railway ===
JR East – Jōban Line

- Toride - Fujishiro

Kantō Railway - Jōsō Line

- Toride - Nishi-Toride - Terahara - Shin-Toride - Yumemino - Inatoi - Togashira

=== Highway ===
- National Route 6
- National Route 294

== Sister cities ==
- Guilin, Guangxi, China
- Yuba City, California, United States

== Notable people from Toride ==
- Kakeru Ayabe, professional baseball player (pitcher for the Yokohama DeNA BayStars)
- Takako Inoue, professional wrestler (All Japan Women's Pro-Wrestling, Ladies Legend Pro-Wrestling, Oz Academy and Arsion)
- Kiyoshi Mutō, architect and structural engineer (considered the "father of the Japanese skyscraper")
- Yoshinari Ogawa, professional wrestler (Pro Wrestling Noah)

== Local attractions ==
- Kokai River Cycling Road
- Kokaigawa Flower Canal
- Tomb of Honda Narishige
- Ryuzen-ji Buddhist temple
- Former Toride-juku Honjin
- Toride Tone River Fireworks
- Toride Yasaka Shrine
