= Yawara, Ibaraki =

Dissolved municipality in Ibaraki prefecture, Japan

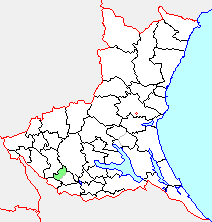
Map of Yawara, Ibaraki

Yawara (谷和原村, Yawara-mura) was a village located in Tsukuba District, Ibaraki Prefecture, Japan.

As of 2003, the village had an estimated population of 15,427 and a density of 459.14 persons per km^{2}. The total area was 33.60 km^{2}.

On March 27, 2006, Yawara, along with the town of Ina (also from Tsukuba District), was merged to create the city of Tsukubamirai.
