= Shin-Moriya Station =

Railway station in Moriya, Ibaraki Prefecture, Japan

Shin-Moriya Station 新守谷駅
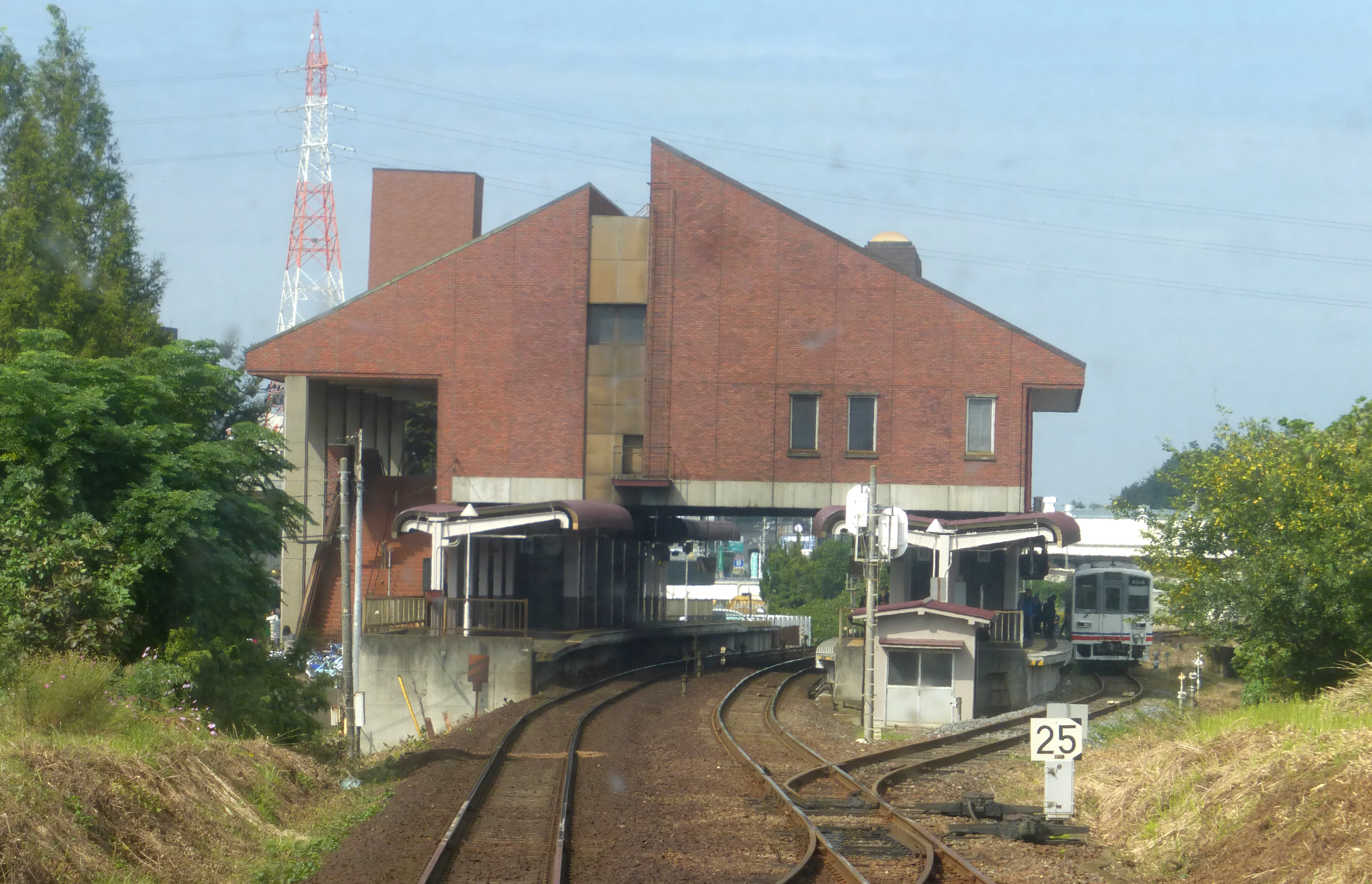
- The station building, platforms and train in October 2016

General information
- Location: 1-1-1 Goshogaoka, Moriya-shi, Ibaraki-ken 302-0119; Japan
- Coordinates: 35.9665°N 139.9858°E
- Operator: Kantō Railway
- Line: ■ Jōsō Line
- Distance: 11.4 km from Toride
- Platforms: 1 side +1 island platform

Other information
- Status: Unstaffed
- Website: Official website

History
- Opened: 27 March 1982; 44 years ago

Passengers
- FY2017: 2564

Services
Preceding station	Kantō Railway	Following station
Moriya towards Toride	Jōsō Line Local	Kokinu towards Shimodate
Location
- Location within Ibaraki Prefecture Location within Japan

Shin-Moriya Station (新守谷駅, Shin-Moriya-eki) is a passenger railway station in the city of Moriya, Ibaraki Prefecture, Japan operated by the private railway company Kantō Railway.

== Lines ==
Shin-Moriya station is served by the Jōsō Line operating between Toride and Shimodate. The station is located 11.4 km (7.1 mi) from the Toride terminus.

== Station layout ==
The station consists of one side platform serving one track in the Shimodate direction and one island platform serving two tracks (one disused) in the Toride direction. The station building is above the platforms.

=== Platforms ===
1	■ Jōsō Line	for Mitsukaidō and Shimodate
2, 3	■ Jōsō Line	for Toride

== History ==
The station opened on 27 March 1982. From 1 September 2010, the station became unstaffed during the daytime.

== Passenger statistics ==
In fiscal 2017, the station was used by an average of 2564 passengers daily.

== Surrounding area ==
- Shin-Moriya Cultural Center
- National Route 294

== See also ==
- List of railway stations in Japan
