= Kokinu Station =

Railway station in Tsukubamirai, Ibaraki Prefecture, Japan

Kokinu Station 小絹駅
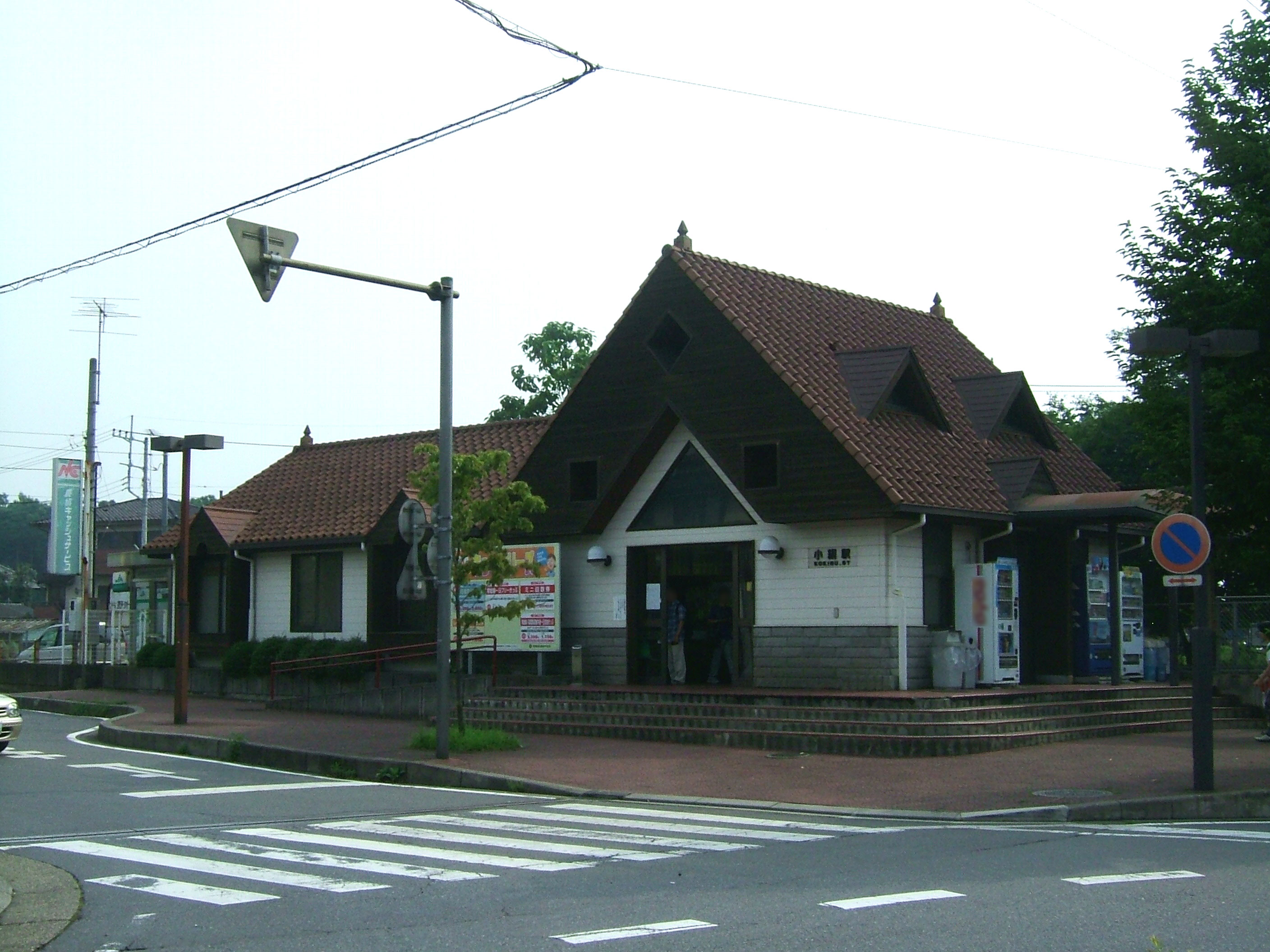
- Kokinu Station, July 2008

General information
- Location: Kokinu 739-3, Tsukubamirai-shi, Ibaraki-ken 300-2445; Japan
- Coordinates: 35.9809°N 139.9832°E
- Operator: Kantō Railway
- Line: ■ Jōsō Line
- Distance: 13.0 km from Toride
- Platforms: 2 side platforms

Other information
- Status: Unstaffed
- Website: Official website

History
- Opened: 1 November 1913; 112 years ago

Passengers
- FY2016: 942

Services
Preceding station	Kantō Railway	Following station
Shin-Moriya towards Toride	Jōsō Line Local	Mitsukaidō towards Shimodate
Location
- Location within Ibaraki Prefecture Location within Japan

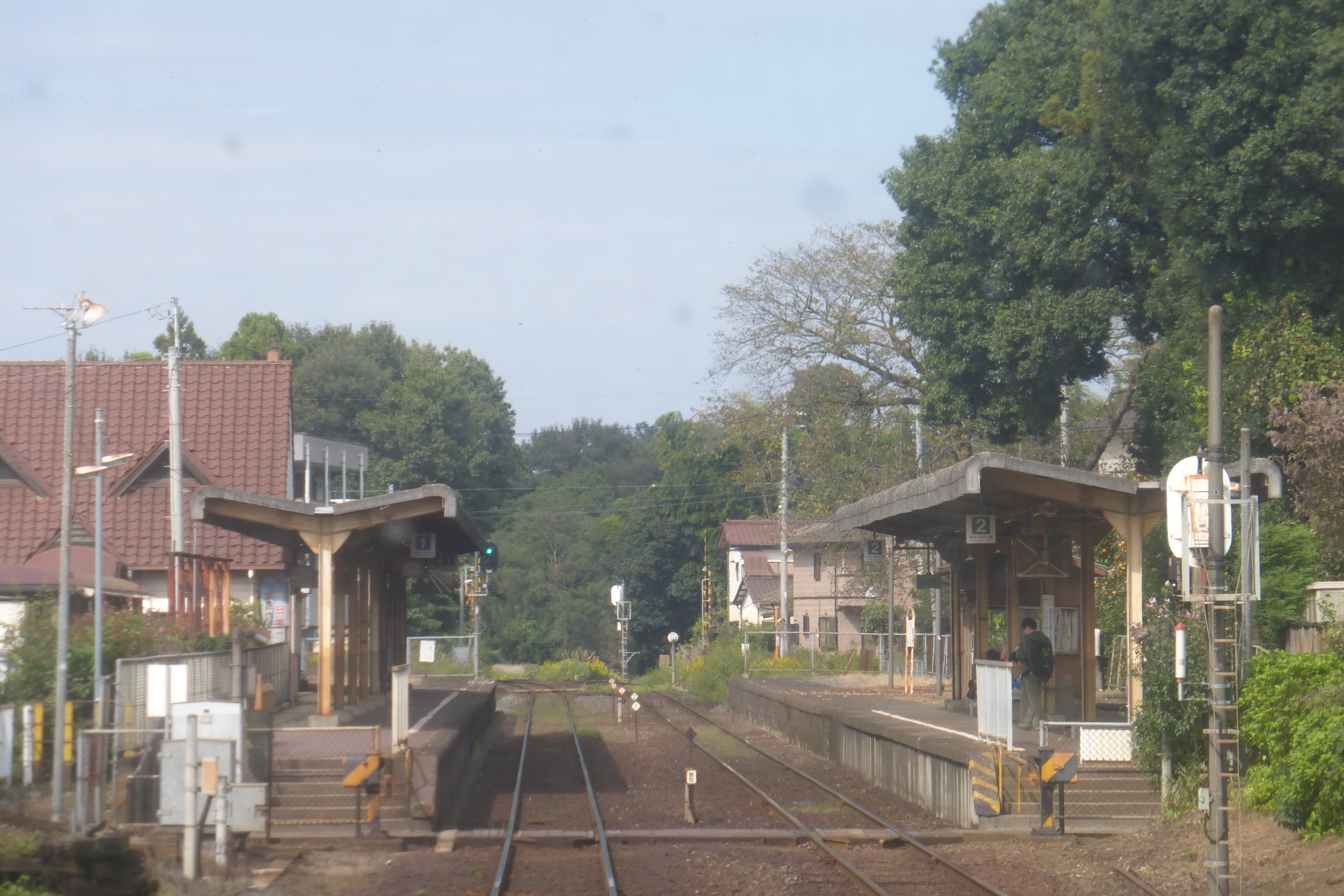
Station platforms, 2016

Kokinu Station (小絹駅, Kokinu-eki) is a passenger railway station in the city of Tsukubamirai, Ibaraki Prefecture, Japan operated by the private railway company Kantō Railway.

== Lines ==
Kokinu Station is a station on the Jōsō Line, and is located 13.0 km (8.1 mi) from the official starting point of the line at Toride Station.

== Station layout ==
The station consists of two opposed side platforms connected by a level crossing. The station is unattended.

=== Platforms ===
1	■ Jōsō Line	for Mitsukaidō and Shimodate
2	■ Jōsō Line	for Moriya and Toride

== History ==
Kokinu Station was opened on 1 November 1913 as a station on the Jōsō Railroad, which became the Kantō Railway in 1965. The station building was rebuilt in 1963 and again in 1990.

== Passenger statistics ==
In fiscal 2016, the station was used by an average of 942 passengers daily (boarding passengers only).

== Surrounding area ==
- Kokinu Post Office
- Kokinu Hachiman-gu
- National Route 294
- Ibaraki New Town Kinu-no-dai

== See also ==
- List of railway stations in Japan
