= Kita-Mitsukaidō Station =

Railway station in Jōsō, Ibaraki Prefecture, Japan

Kita-Mitsukaidō Station 北水海道駅
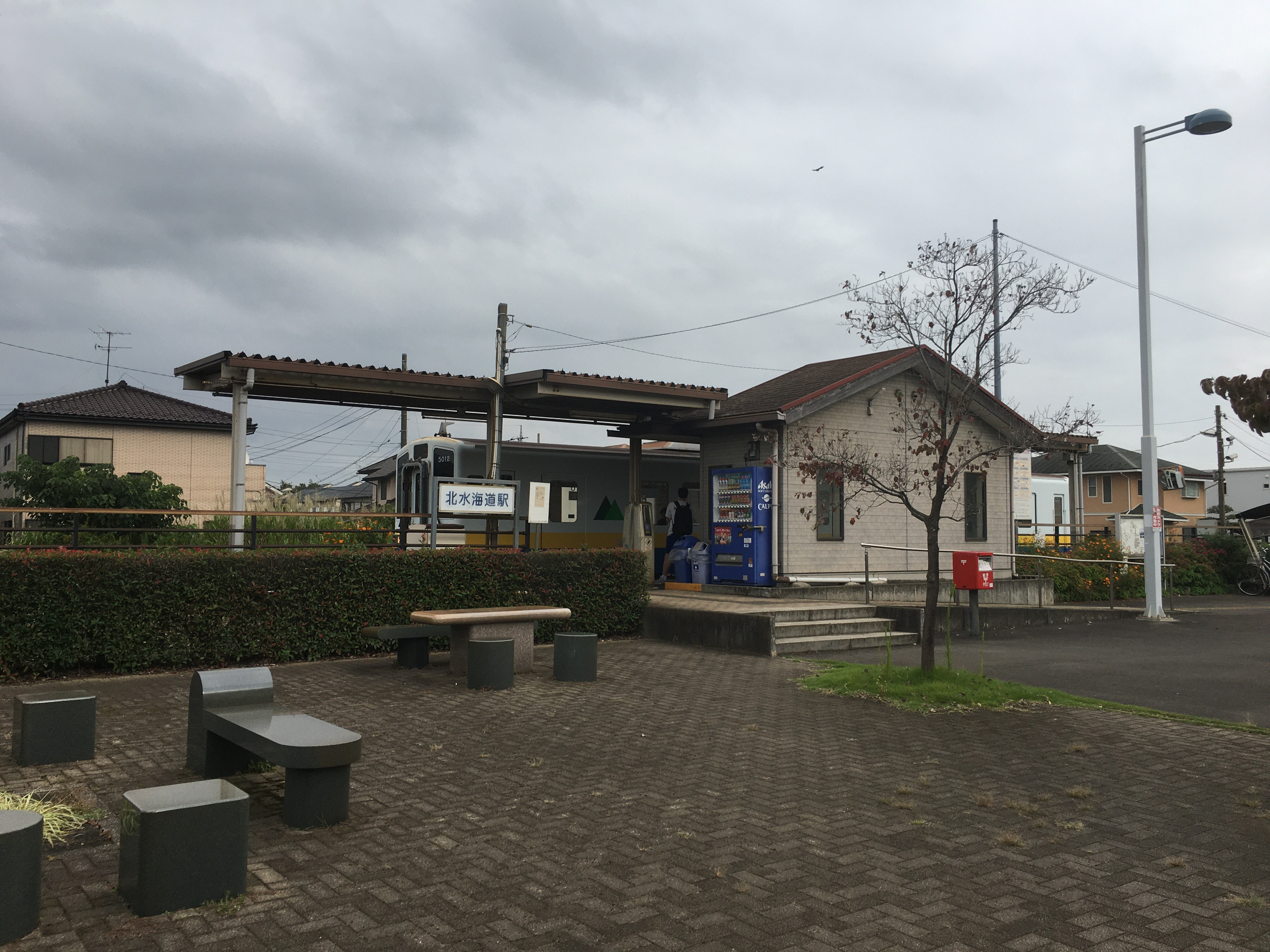
- Kita-Mitsukaidō Station, September 2021

General information
- Location: Ainoya-machi 43-3, Jōsō-shi, Ibaraki-ken 303-0005; Japan
- Coordinates: 36.0321°N 139.9927°E
- Line: ■ Jōsō Line
- Distance: 19.3 km from Toride
- Platforms: 1 side platform

Other information
- Status: Unstaffed
- Website: Official website

History
- Opened: 15 March 1972; 54 years ago

Passengers
- FY2017: 447

Services
Preceding station	Kantō Railway	Following station
Mitsukaidō towards Toride	Jōsō Line Local	Nakatsuma towards Shimodate
Location
- Location within Ibaraki Prefecture Location within Japan

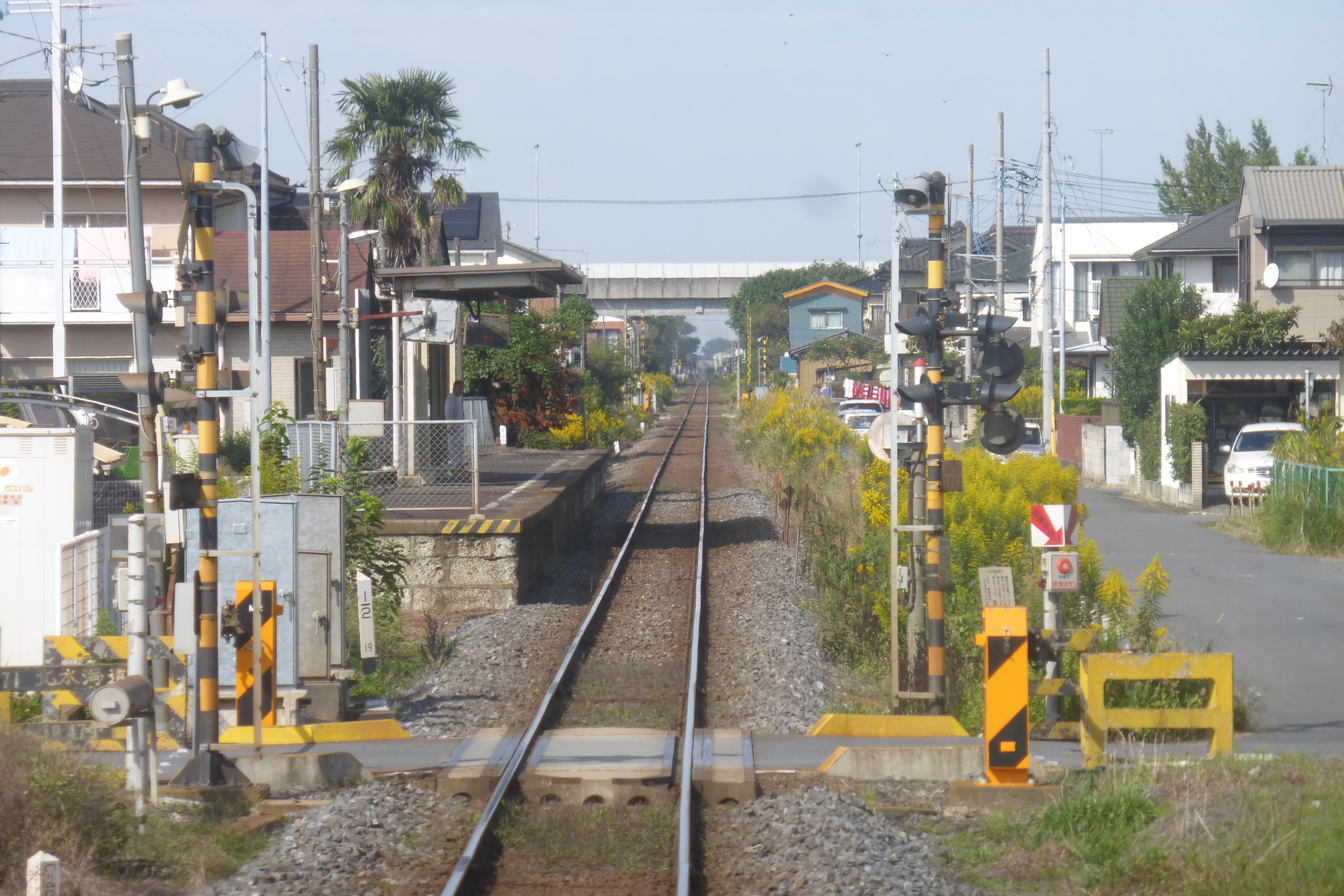
Station platform, 2016

Kita-Mitsukaidō Station (北水海道駅, Kita-Mitsukaidō-eki) is a passenger railway station in the city of Jōsō, Ibaraki Prefecture, Japan operated by the private railway company Kantō Railway.

== Lines ==
Kita-Mitsukaidō Station is a station on the Jōsō Line, and is located 19.3 km (12.0 mi) from the official starting point of the line at Toride Station.

== Station layout ==
The station consists of a single side platform serving traffic in both directions. The station is unattended.

== History ==
Kita-Mitsukaidō Station was opened on 15 March 1972.

== Passenger statistics ==
In fiscal 2017, the station was used by an average of 447 passengers daily).

== Surrounding area ==
The station is located in a suburban area of Jōsō city.

== See also ==
- List of railway stations in Japan
