= Terahara Station =

Railway station in Toride, Ibaraki Prefecture, Japan

Terahara Station 寺原駅
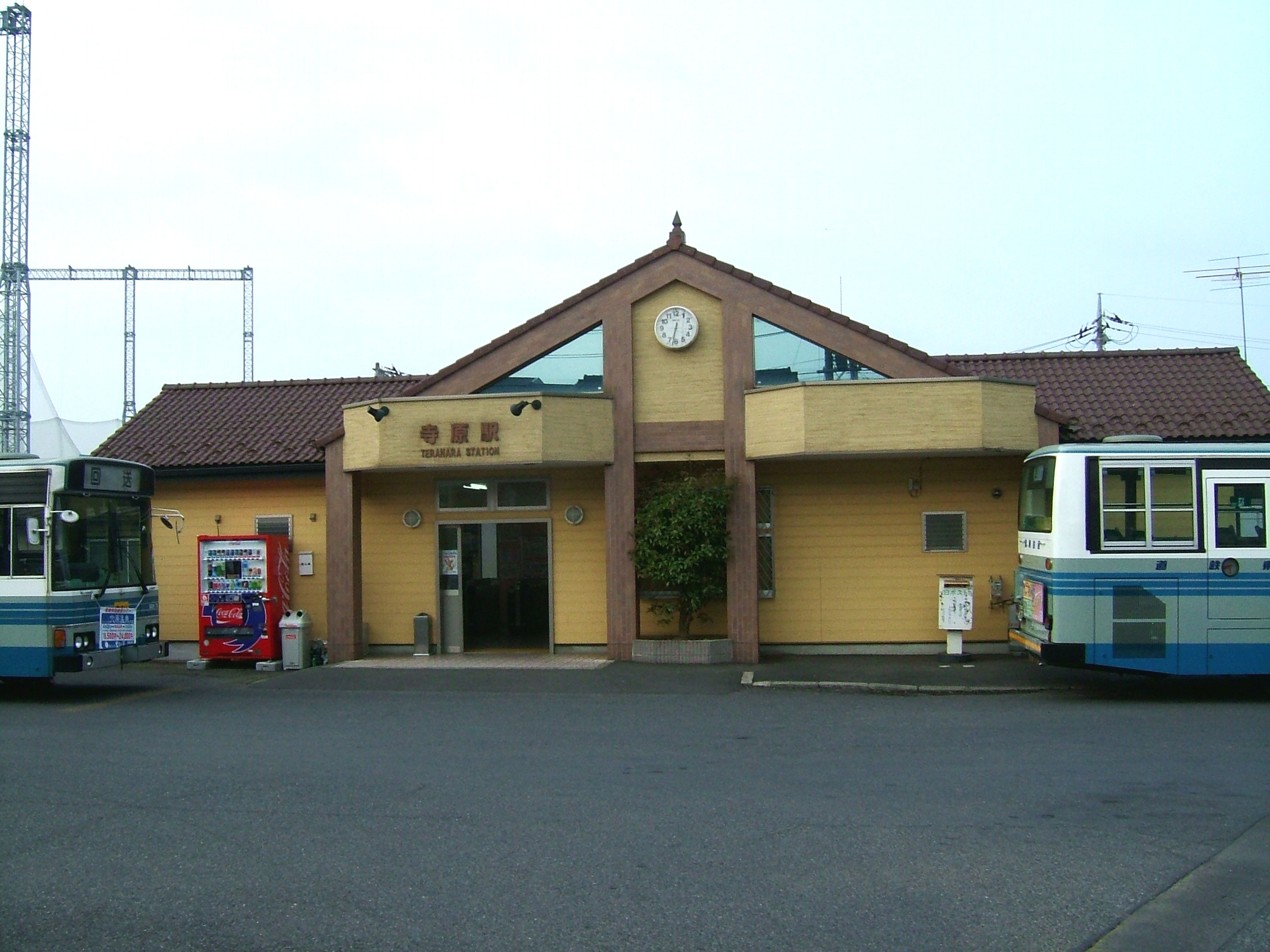
- Terahara Station, May 2008

General information
- Location: Kobama 1-1-1, Toride-shi, Ibaraki-ken 302-0027; Japan
- Coordinates: 35.9118°N 140.0547°E
- Operator: Kantō Railway
- Line: ■ Jōsō Line
- Distance: 2.1 km from Toride
- Platforms: 2 side platforms

Other information
- Status: Unstaffed
- Website: Official website

History
- Opened: 1 November 1913; 112 years ago

Passengers
- FY2018: 1942

Services
Preceding station	Kantō Railway	Following station
Nishi-Toride towards Toride	Jōsō Line Rapid; Local	Shin-Toride towards Shimodate
Location
- Location within Ibaraki Prefecture Location within Japan

Terahara Station (寺原駅, Terahara-eki) is a passenger railway station in the city of Toride, Ibaraki Prefecture, Japan operated by the private railway company Kantō Railway.

== Lines ==
Terahara Station is a station on the Jōsō Line, and is located 2.1 km (1.3 mi) from the official starting point of the line at Toride Station.

== Station layout ==
The station consists of two opposed side platforms, connected to the ground-level station building by a level crossing. The station is unattended.

=== Platforms ===
1	■ Jōsō Line	for Toride
2	■ Jōsō Line	for Shimodate

== History ==
Terahara Station was opened on 1 November 1913 as a station on the Jōsō Railway, which became the Kantō Railway in 1965.

== Passenger statistics ==
In fiscal 2018, the station was used by an average of 1942 passengers daily (boarding passengers only).

== Surrounding area ==
- Toride City Hall
- Toride Post Office

== See also ==
- List of railway stations in Japan
