= Minami-Moriya Station =

Railway station in Moriya, Ibaraki Prefecture, Japan

Minami-Moriya Station 南守谷駅
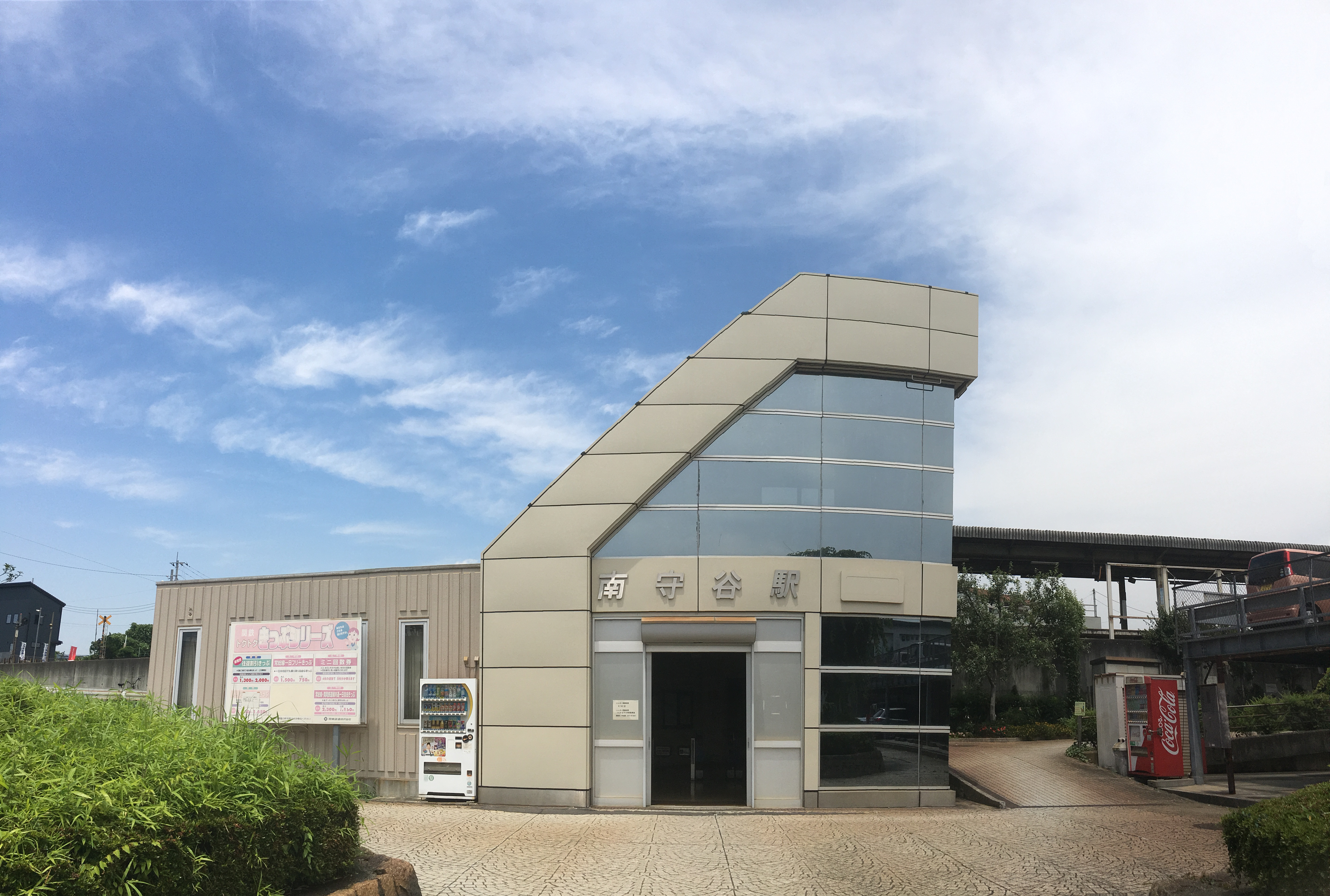
- Minami-Moriya Station in June 2020

General information
- Location: 1-1-1 Keyaki-dai, Moriya-shi, Ibaraki-ken 302-0128; Japan
- Coordinates: 35.9343°N 140.0022°E
- Operator: Kantō Railway
- Line: ■ Jōsō Line
- Distance: 7.4 km from Toride
- Platforms: 1 island platform
- Tracks: 2

Other information
- Status: Unstaffed
- Website: Official website

History
- Opened: 15 November 1960; 65 years ago

Passengers
- FY2017: 2426

Services
Preceding station	Kantō Railway	Following station
Togashira towards Toride	Jōsō Line Rapid; Local	Moriya towards Shimodate
Location
- Location within Ibaraki Prefecture Location within Japan

Minami-Moriya Station (南守谷駅, Minami-Moriya-eki) is a passenger railway station in the city of Moriya, Ibaraki Prefecture, Japan operated by the private railway company Kantō Railway.

== Lines ==
Minami-Moriya Station is served by the Jōsō Line, and is located 7.4 km (4.6 mi) from the starting point of the line at Toride Station.

== Station layout ==
The station consists of a single elevated island platform with the station building underneath. The station has been unstaffed since February 2010.

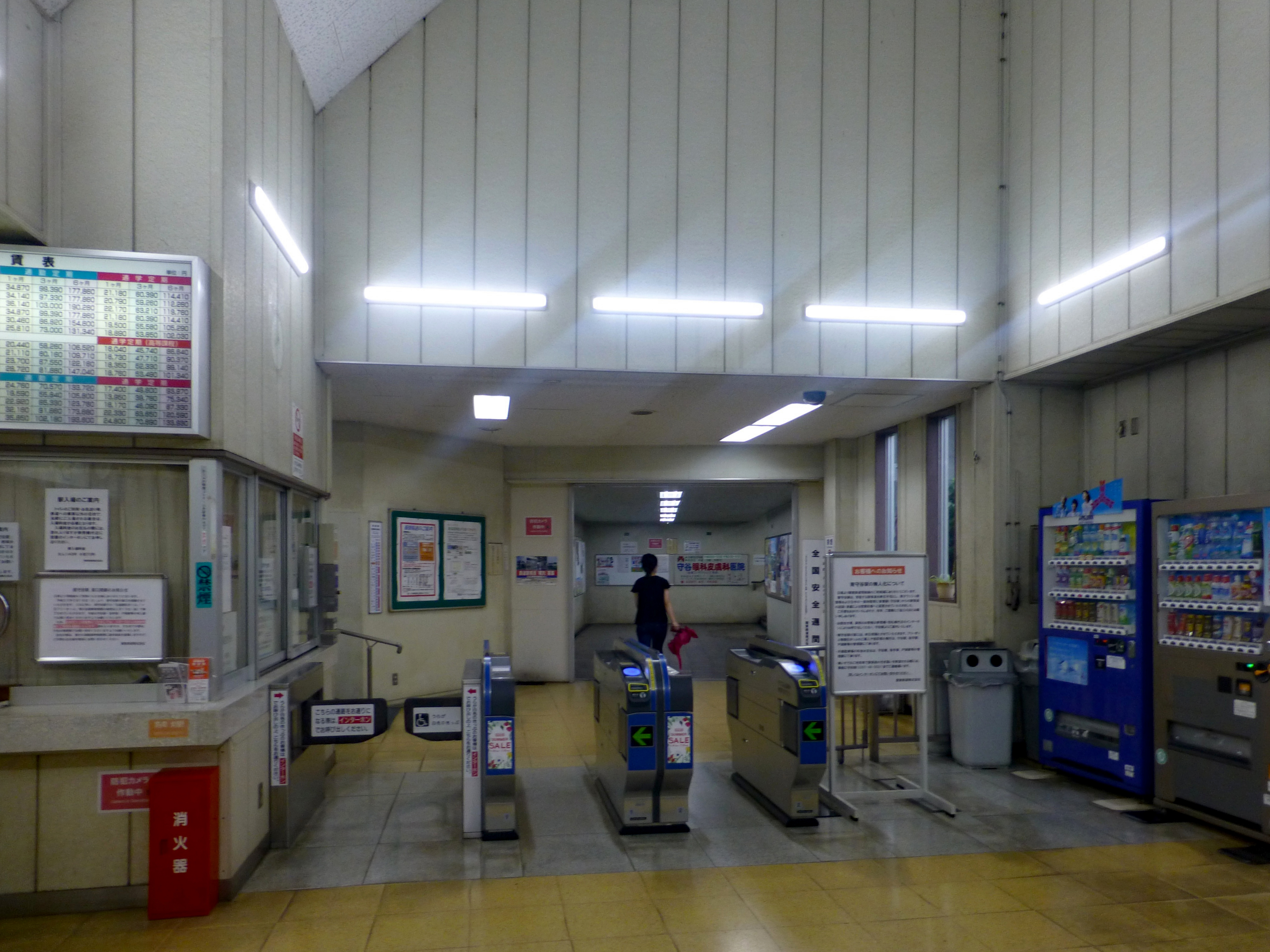
The ticket barriers in June 2016

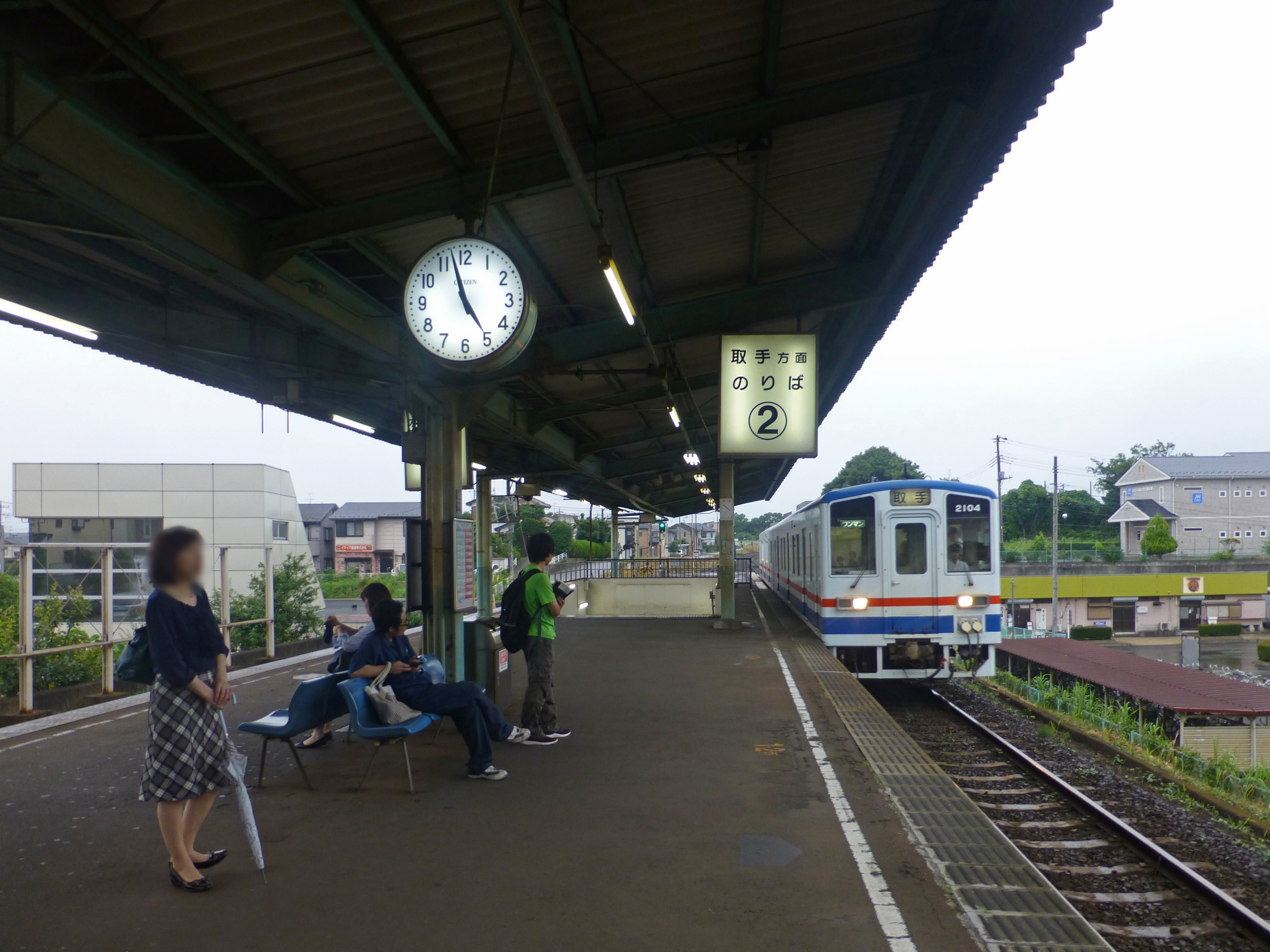
The platforms in June 2016

=== Platforms ===
1	■ Jōsō Line	for Shimodate
2	■ Jōsō Line	for Toride

== History ==
Minami-Moriya Station opened on 15 November 1960.

== Passenger statistics ==
In fiscal 2017, the station was used by an average of 2426 passengers daily.

== Surrounding area ==
- Moriya-Izumino Post Office
- Ibaraki New Town Minami-Moriya

== See also ==
- List of railway stations in Japan
