= Nishi-Toride Station =

Railway station in Toride, Ibaraki Prefecture, Japan

Nishi-Toride Station 西取手駅
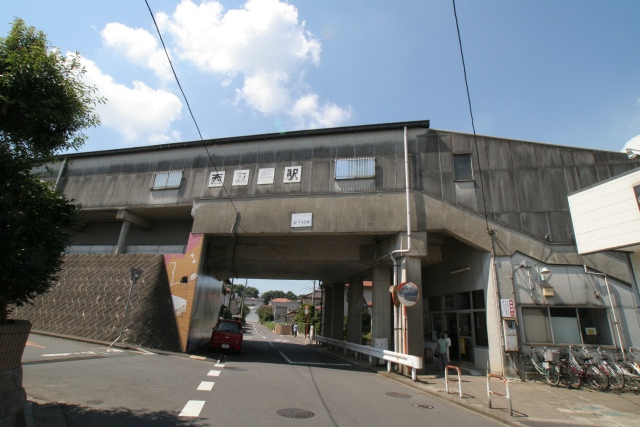
- Nishi-Toride Station, August 2007

General information
- Location: Hongo 1-13-1, Toride-shi, Ibaraki-ken 302-0022; Japan
- Coordinates: 35.9086°N 140.0594°E
- Operator: Kantō Railway
- Line: ■ Jōsō Line
- Distance: 2.1 km from Toride
- Platforms: 2 side platforms

Other information
- Status: Unstaffed
- Website: Official website

History
- Opened: 1 December 1979; 46 years ago

Passengers
- FY2018: 2498

Services
Preceding station	Kantō Railway	Following station
Toride Terminus	Jōsō Line Rapid; Local	Terahara towards Shimodate
Location
- Location within Ibaraki Prefecture Location within Japan

Nishi-Toride Station (西取手駅, Nishi-Toride-eki) is a passenger railway station in the city of Toride, Ibaraki Prefecture, Japan operated by the private railway company Kantō Railway.

== Lines ==
Terahara Station is a station on the Jōsō Line, and is located 2.1 km (1.3 mi) from the official starting point of the line at Toride Station.

== Station layout ==
The station consists of two opposed elevated side platforms, with the station building underneath. The station is unattended.

=== Platforms ===
1	■ Jōsō Line	for Toride
2	■ Jōsō Line	for Shimodate

== History ==
Nishi-Toride Station was opened on 1 December 1979.

== Passenger statistics ==
In fiscal 2018, the station was used by an average of 2498 passengers daily (boarding passengers only).

== Surrounding area ==
- Toride-Shirayama Post Office

== See also ==
- List of railway stations in Japan
