= Mitsukaidō Station =

Railway station in Jōsō, Ibaraki Prefecture, Japan

Mitsukaidō Station 水海道駅
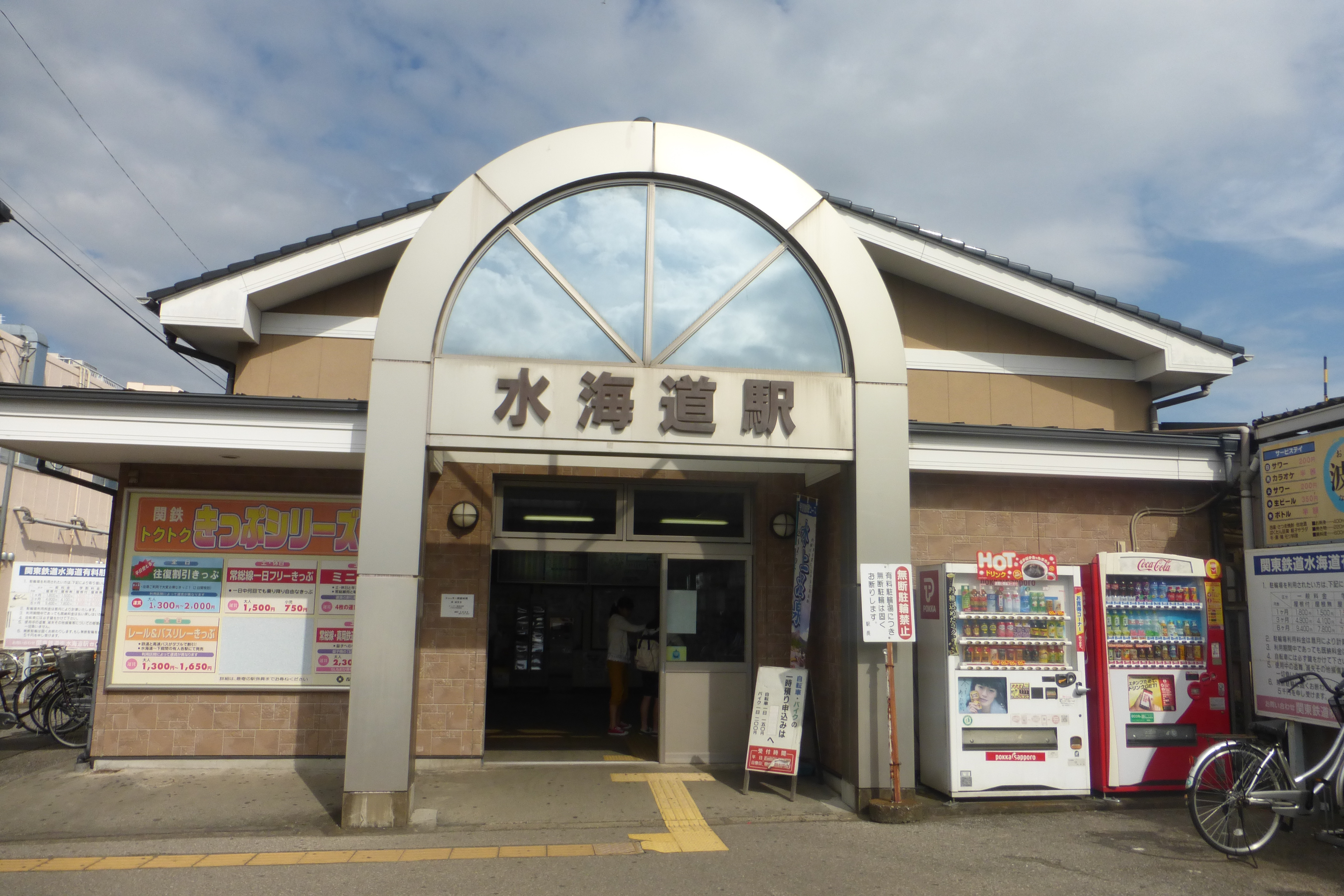
- Mitsukaidō Station, October 2016

General information
- Location: Mitsukaidō Takara-machi 2861-2, Jōsō-shi, Ibaraki-ken 303-0023; Japan
- Coordinates: 36.0187°N 139.9922°E
- Operator: Kantō Railway
- Line: ■ Jōsō Line
- Distance: 17.5 km from Toride
- Platforms: 1 side+ 1 island platform

Other information
- Status: Staffed
- Website: Official website

History
- Opened: 1 November 1913; 112 years ago

Passengers
- FY2017: 2974

Services
Preceding station	Kantō Railway	Following station
Moriya towards Toride	Jōsō Line Rapid	Ishige towards Shimodate
Kokinu towards Toride	Jōsō Line Local	Kita-Mitsukaidō towards Shimodate
Location
- Location within Ibaraki Prefecture Location within Japan

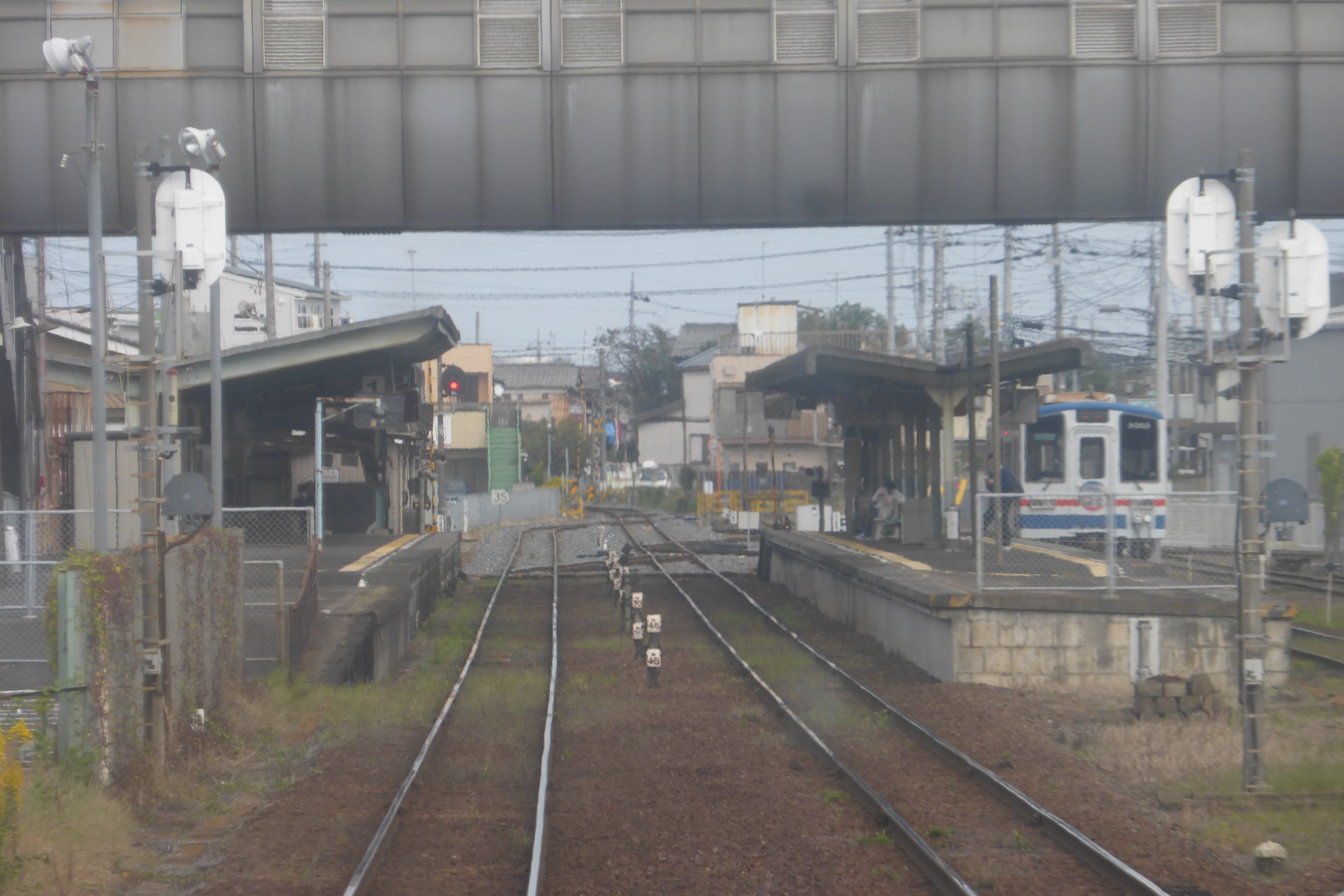
Platforms and train, 2016

Mitsukaidō Station (水海道駅, Mitsukaidō-eki) is a passenger railway station in the city of Jōsō, Ibaraki Prefecture, Japan operated by the private railway company Kantō Railway.

== Lines ==
Mitsukaidō Station is a station on the Jōsō Line, and is located 17.5 km (10.9 mi) from the official starting point of the line at Toride Station.

== Station layout ==
The station consists one side platform and one island platform connected by a level crossing. The station was originally the head office of the Jōsō Railway.

=== Platforms ===
1	■ Jōsō Line	for Moriya and Toride for Shimotsuma and Shimodate
2	■ Jōsō Line	for starting trains
3	■ Jōsō Line	for Moriya and Toride for Shimotsuma and Shimodate

== History ==
Mitsukaidō Station was opened on 1 November 1913 as a station on the Jōsō Railroad, which became the Kantō Railway in 1965. The station building was rebuilt in 1973.

== Passenger statistics ==
In fiscal 2017, the station was used by an average of 2974 passengers daily).

== Surrounding area ==
- Mitsukaidō Post Office
- former Mitsukaidō City Hall

== See also ==
- List of railway stations in Japan
