= Tsukuba Heliport =

Tsukuba Heliport つくばヘリポート
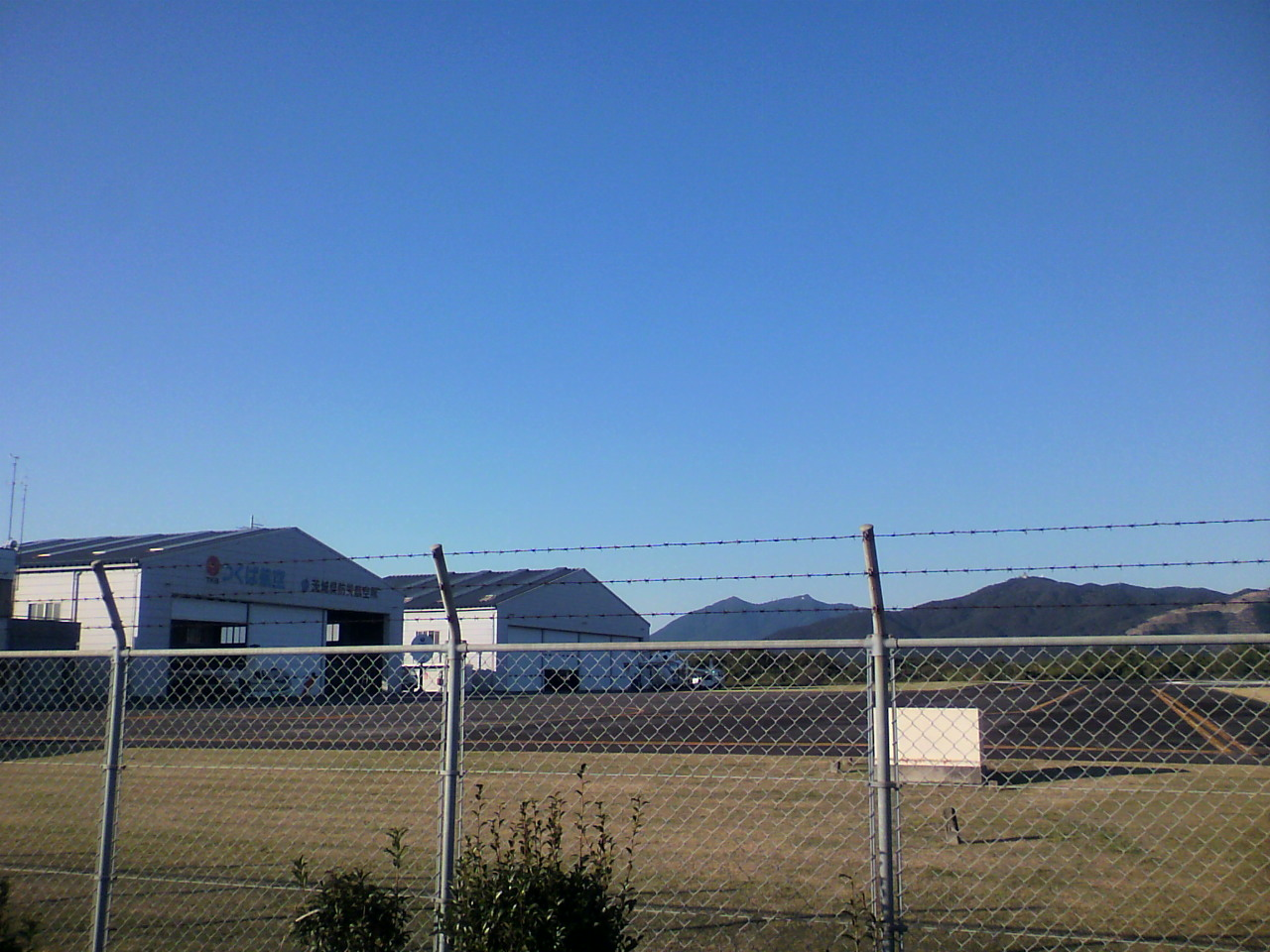
- IATA: none; ICAO: none

Summary
- Airport type: Public
- Operator: Government of Ibaraki Prefecture
- Serves: Tsukuba
- Location: Tsukuba, Ibaraki Prefecture
- Elevation AMSL: 8 m (26 ft)
- Coordinates: 36°07′03″N 140°07′52″E

Map
- Location in Japan

Helipads
Number	Length		Surface
Number	m	ft	Surface
H1	35× 30	115 × 98	Asphalt concrete

Tsukuba Heliport (つくばヘリポート, Tsukuba Heripōto) is a heliport in Tsukuba, Ibaraki, Japan. It is operated by Japan Airport Consultants Co., Ltd. under the management of the prefectural government.

== History ==
The survey was started in 1988 as the first step to improve the empty public transportation infrastructure in Ibaraki Prefecture, and the construction of the Tsukuba Heliport was started in 1990. It was opened on July 23, 1991. The construction cost at the time of opening the port is about 780 million yen. At the time of formulating the opening plan, heliport construction was formulated together with the Mito area, but due to problems such as securing land, Tsukuba City was prioritized, and as a result, the Mito area was included in the Hyakuri Airfield Private Sharing Plan.

== Facilities ==
Tsukuba Heliport is the first heliport in Ibaraki Prefecture for public use on the northeastern border of Tsukuba, and is located to connect the flight time to Tokyo in about 20 minutes. In addition to administrative applications such as disaster prevention and police, personnel transportation of private operators, aerial photography, pesticide spraying bases, training machines from nearby heliports such as Moriya and Shimotsuma and news helicopters. It is used as a landing site for helicopters for repairing antenna bases. Operating hours are from 7:00 am to 7:00 pm. However, takeoff and landing are not possible after sunset.

The facility has a runway with a length of 35 m (115 ft) and a width of 30 m (98 ft) and berths for large and small aircraft in a site area of approximately 3.1 hectares, and the runway has a maximum takeoff strength of 9 tons. A helicopter with a total length of 26 m (85 ft) or less can take off and land. In addition, a terminal building with a pilot rest facility and a passenger waiting area, and a hangar for four helicopters is also installed on the same site.
