= Moriya, Ibaraki =

Moriya 守谷市
- City
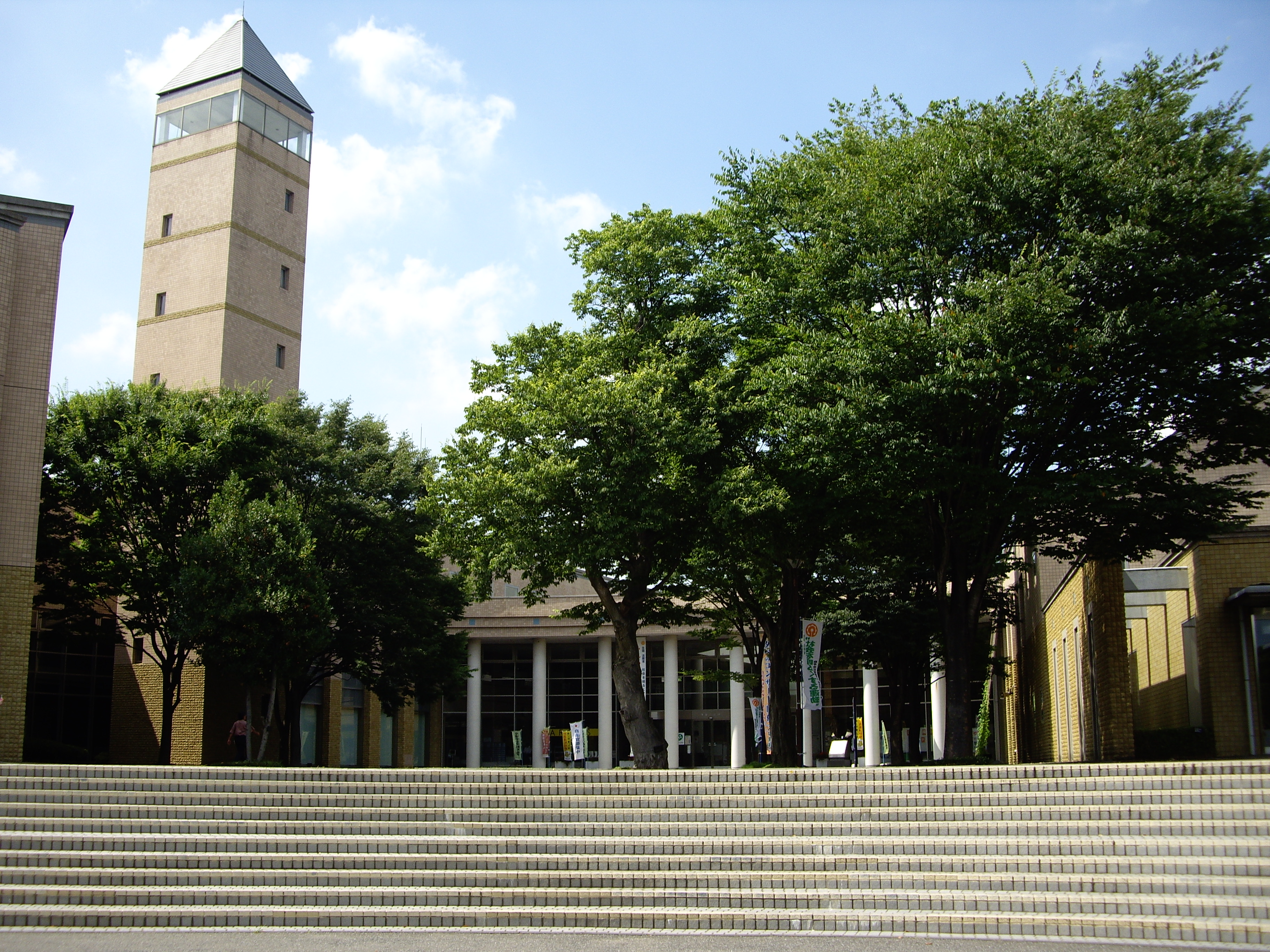
- Moriya city hall

- Flag Seal

- Location of Moriya in Ibaraki Prefecture

- Coordinates: 35°57′5.1″N 139°58′31.5″E
- Country: Japan
- Region: Kantō
- Prefecture: Ibaraki

Area
  - Total: 35.71 km^{2} (13.79 sq mi)

Population (April 2024)
  - Total: 69,827
  - Density: 1,955/km^{2} (5,064/sq mi)
- Time zone: UTC+9 (Japan Standard Time)
- Tree: Pine
- Flower: Lilium auratum
- Bird: Chinese bamboo partridge
- Phone number: 0297-45-1111
- Address: Okashiwa 950-1, Moriya-shi, Ibaraki-ken 302-0116
- Website: Official website

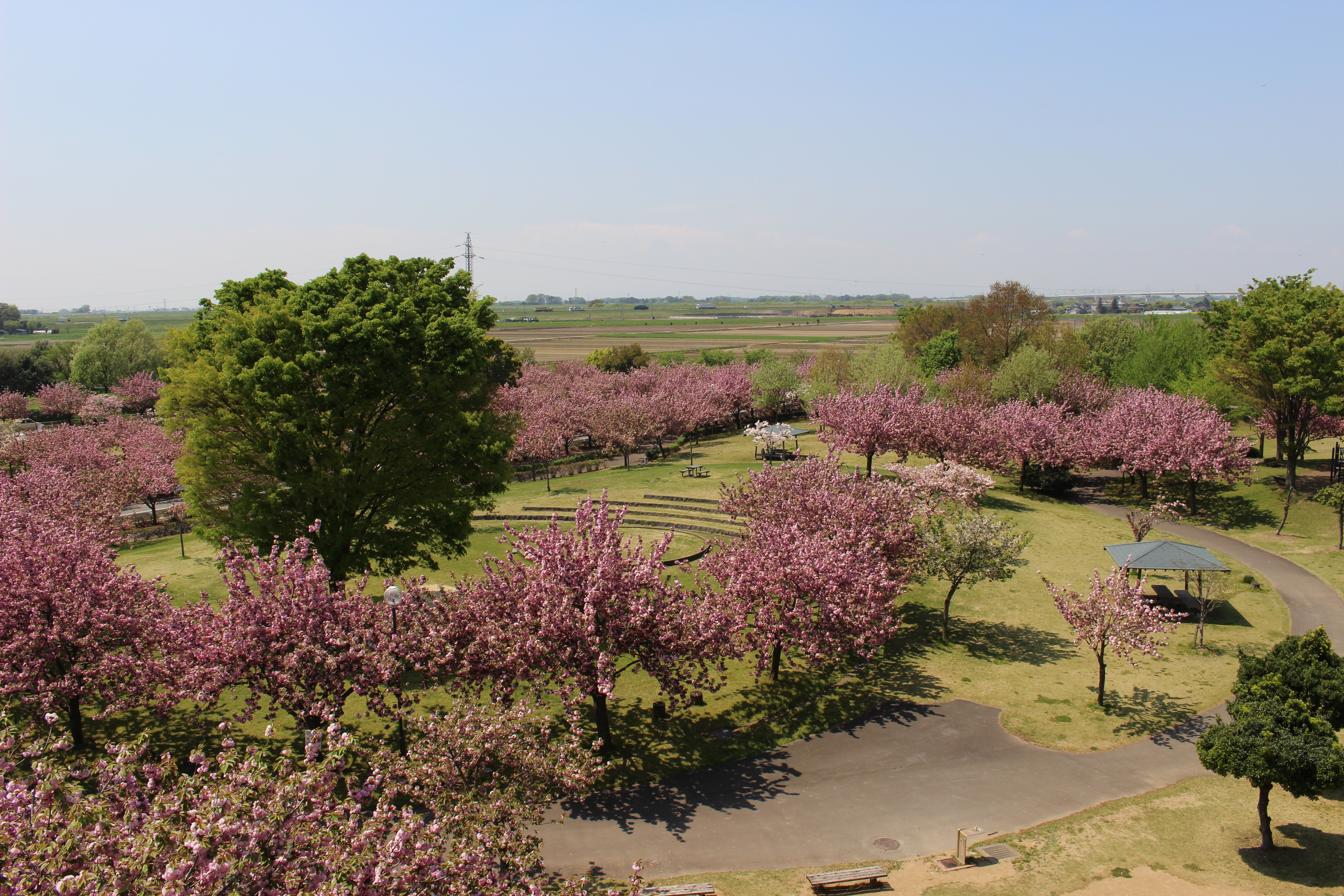
Sakura-no-mori Park in Moriya

Moriya (守谷市, Moriya-shi) is a city located in Ibaraki Prefecture, Japan. As of 1 April 2024, the city had an estimated population of 69,827 in 29,056 households and a population density of 1955 persons per km². The percentage of the population aged over 65 was 23.1%. The total area of the city is 35.71 square kilometres (13.79 sq mi).

== Geography ==
Moriya is located in southwestern Ibaraki Prefecture, bordering on Chiba Prefecture to the southwest. The city is surrounded by three rivers, the Kinugawa, Kokaigawa and the Tone River, one of the longest rivers in Japan. In terms of area, it is the smallest city in Ibaraki Prefecture. It is located approximately 35 kilometers from central Tokyo.

=== Surrounding municipalities ===
Chiba Prefecture

- Kashiwa
- Noda

Ibaraki Prefecture

- Jōsō
- Toride
- Tsukubamirai

=== Climate ===
Moriya has a humid subtropical climate (Köppen Cfa) characterized by warm summers and cool winters with light snowfall. The average annual temperature in Moriya is 14.4 °C. The average annual rainfall is 1325 mm with September as the wettest month. The temperatures are highest on average in August, at around 26.3 °C, and lowest in January, at around 3.5 °C.

=== Topography ===
With an area of 35.63 km2, the city has the smallest land area in the prefecture. The city is shaped like a circle, 7.5 km east to west and 7.2 km north to south, and most of the city area belongs to the Jōsō, a plateau with an average elevation of 20 m above sea level. Although residential land development is underway throughout the city, there are still many natural features such as fields of ore soil mainly on the plateau and alluvial rice paddies mainly along the Tone River.

==== City location (World Geodetic System) ====
- East end: 140 degrees 01 minutes 21 seconds east longitude (Honmachi)
- West end: East longitude 139 degrees 55 minutes 54 seconds (Oki)
- South end: 35 degrees 54 minutes 35 seconds north latitude (Takano)
- North end: 35 degrees 58 minutes 44 seconds north latitude (Itatoi)

=== Rivers ===
The Kokai River flows northeast of the city, the Kinugawa River west of the city, and the Tone River south of the city, which used to be a cove. Although the city and most of the city area were located on a plateau, flood damage was often observed in the low-lying areas because the city was surrounded by rivers on three sides. However, the danger has gradually decreased since the Meiji Era (1868-1912) with the construction of levees and regulating reservoirs, as well as the relocation of houses within the regulating areas. Large-scale flooding did not occur until around 1982, and the inundation itself was over by 1985. Today, only a few areas are considered potentially inundated due to flooding and improvement of inundated areas. In addition, since the area was surrounded by rivers, it benefited from the river boat transportation developed since the Edo period, and became a relay point from the lower reaches of the Tone River, such as Choushi, to Sekiyado and the Edogawa River area, and a concentration point for products from the northern Kanto region via the Kinugawa River.

== Demographics ==
Per Japanese census data, the population of Moriya has grown rapidly since the 1970s.

Historical population
Year	Pop.	±%
1920	38,559	—
1930	37,829	−1.9%
1940	37,718	−0.3%
1950	12,160	−67.8%
1960	11,449	−5.8%
1970	12,300	+7.4%
1980	17,585	+43.0%
1990	35,427	+101.5%
2000	50,362	+42.2%
2010	62,482	+24.1%
2020	68,421	+9.5%

== History ==
Moriya developed in the Kamakura period as a castle town ruled by the Sōma clan, who ruled northern Shimōsa Province. During the Edo period Tokugawa shogunate, much of the area was ruled as part of Sakura Domain, followed by Sekiyado Domain. The town of Moriya was established within Kitasōma District on April 1, 1889 with the creation of the modern municipalities system. It was elevated to city status February 2, 2002.

== Government ==
Moriya has a mayor-council form of government with a directly elected mayor and a unicameral city council of 20 members. Moriya contributes one member to the Ibaraki Prefectural Assembly. In terms of national politics, the city is part of Ibaraki 3rd district of the lower house of the Diet of Japan.

== Economy ==
Moriya was an agricultural area until the late 1970s, when the development of new towns and industrial parks made it a commuter town and suburb of greater Tokyo.

== Education ==
Moriya has nine public elementary schools and four public middle schools operated by the city government, and one public high school operated by the Ibaraki Prefectural Board of Education. There are also one private elementary school and three private high schools.

== Transportation ==
=== Railway ===
Metropolitan Intercity Railway Company - Tsukuba Express

  - Moriya

Kantō Railway - Jōsō Line

- Minami-Moriya - Moriya - Shin-Moriya

=== Highway ===
- Jōban Expressway – Moriya Service Area, Yawara Interchange
- National Route 294

== Sister cities ==
- (United States) Greeley, Colorado, USA, sister city since August 1993
- Mainburg, Germany, friendship city since September 1990

== Local attractions ==
- site of Moriya Castle

== Notable people from Moriya ==
- Masakatsu Sawa, professional football player
- Takuya Terada, actor, singer, model
- Rui Sasaki, glass artist
