= Jōsō Line =

Railway line in Japan

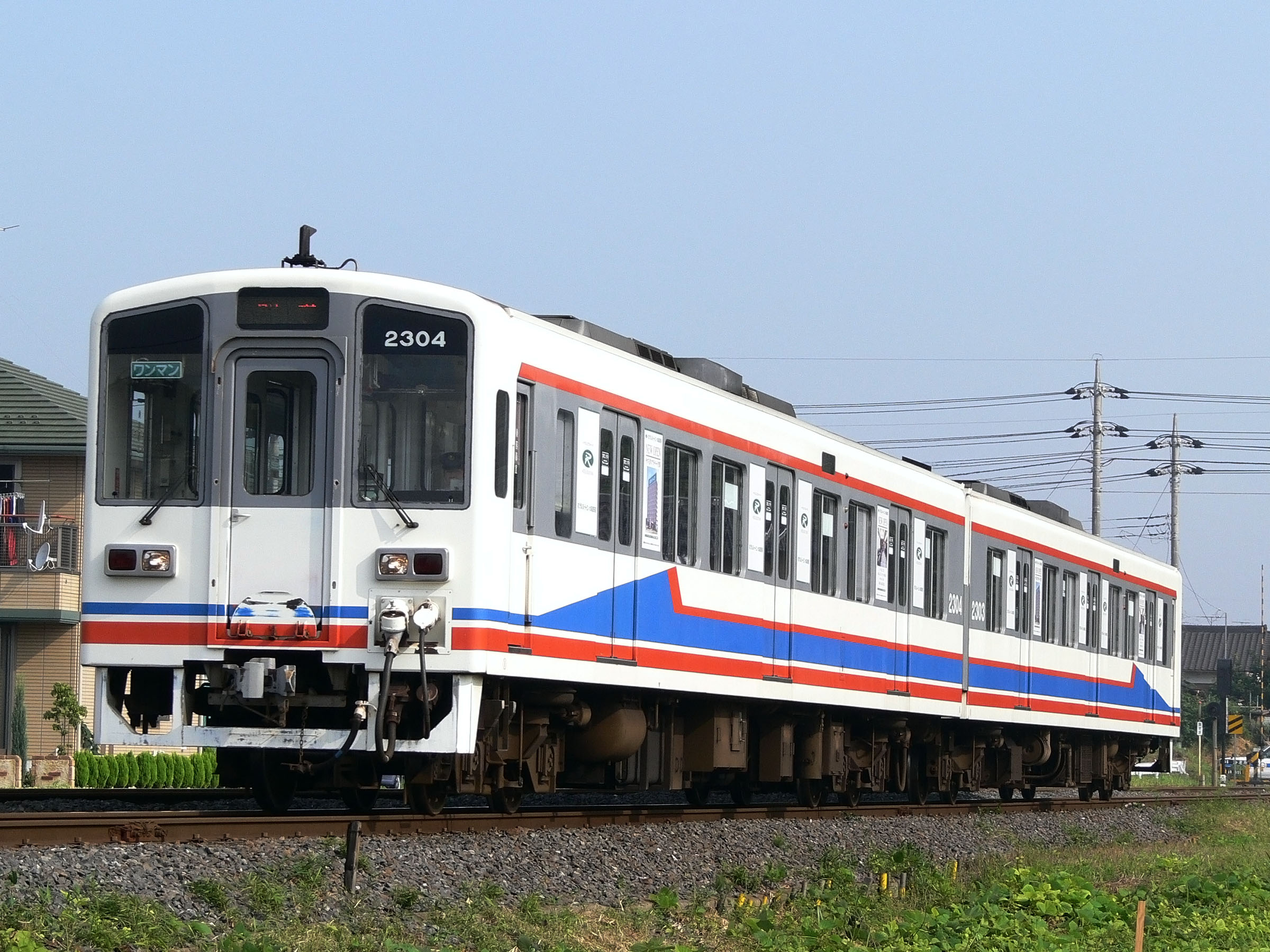
- A Kantō Railway KiHa 2300 series two-car DMU in July 2008

Overview
- Native name: 常総線
- Owner: Kantō Railway
- Locale: Ibaraki Prefecture
- Termini: Toride; Shimodate
- Stations: 25

Service
- Type: Heavy rail
- Rolling stock: See § Rolling stock

History
- Opened: 1 November 1913; 112 years ago

Technical
- Line length: 51.1 km (31.8 mi)
- Number of tracks: Toride–Mitsukaido: 2; Mitsukaido–Shimodate: 1
- Track gauge: 1,067 mm (3 ft 6 in)
- Minimum radius: 290 m (950 ft)
- Operating speed: 90 km/h (56 mph)

The Jōsō Line (Japanese: 常総線, Hepburn: Jōsō-sen) is a railway line in Ibaraki Prefecture, Japan, operated by the private railway operator Kantō Railway. It is a non-electrified line which connects Toride to Shimodate.

The Jōsō Line connects with the Tsukuba Express line, which opened in 2005, at Moriya Station, the only interchange other than at its two termini.

In fiscal 1999, the Jōsō Line carried an annual total of 14.16 million passengers (38,000 per day), making it the busiest non-electrified private line in Japan.

== Services ==
A Jōsō Line train, 2016

Almost all services on the Line are Local trains, stopping at every station. Approximately 5 services in each direction each day operate as Rapid trains, only stopping at major stations.

Travel from Toride to stations north of Mitsukaido generally requires a change of train at Mitsukaido, though connection times are short.

=== Toride to Mitsukaido ===
Services operate approximately every 10-15 minutes during morning & evening peak hours (every 15 minutes on weekends & holidays) and every 20 minutes at other times. Travel time is approximately 30 minutes.

=== Mitsukaido to Shimodate ===
Services operate approximately every 30-60 minutes, with some extra services between Mitsukaido and Shimotsuma. Travel time is approximately 50-60 minutes.

== Stations ==
All stations are in Ibaraki Prefecture.

Station	Distance in km (mi)		Rapid	Transfers	Location
Station	Between stations	Total	Rapid	Transfers	Location
Toride 取手	—N/a	0 (0)	●	Jōban Line	Toride
Nishi-Toride 西取手	1.6 (0.99)	1.6 (0.99)	●		Toride
Terahara 寺原	0.5 (0.31)	2.1 (1.3)	●		Toride
Shin-Toride 新取手	1.3 (0.81)	3.4 (2.1)	●		Toride
Yumemino ゆめみ野	0.8 (0.50)	4.2 (2.6)	●		Toride
Inatoi 稲戸井	1.2 (0.75)	5.4 (3.4)	●		Toride
Togashira 戸頭	0.9 (0.56)	6.3 (3.9)	●		Toride
Minami-Moriya 南守谷	1.1 (0.68)	7.4 (4.6)	●		Moriya
Moriya 守谷	2.2 (1.4)	9.6 (6.0)	●	Tsukuba Express	Moriya
Shin-Moriya 新守谷	1.8 (1.1)	11.4 (7.1)	｜		Moriya
Kokinu 小絹	1.6 (0.99)	13.0 (8.1)	｜		Tsukubamirai
Mitsukaidō 水海道	4.5 (2.8)	17.5 (10.9)	●		Jōsō
Kita-Mitsukaidō 北水海道	1.8 (1.1)	19.3 (12.0)	｜		Jōsō
Nakatsuma 中妻	1.6 (0.99)	20.9 (13.0)	｜		Jōsō
Mitsuma 三妻	3.0 (1.9)	23.9 (14.9)	｜		Jōsō
Minami-Ishige 南石下	3.3 (2.1)	27.2 (16.9)	｜		Jōsō
Ishige 石下	1.6 (0.99)	28.8 (17.9)	●		Jōsō
Tamamura 玉村	2.2 (1.4)	31.0 (19.3)	｜		Jōsō
Sōdō 宗道	2.0 (1.2)	33.0 (20.5)	｜		Shimotsuma
Shimotsuma 下妻	3.1 (1.9)	36.1 (22.4)	●		Shimotsuma
Daihō 大宝	2.6 (1.6)	38.7 (24.0)	｜		Shimotsuma
Tobanoe 騰波ノ江	2.3 (1.4)	41.0 (25.5)	｜		Shimotsuma
Kurogo 黒子	2.6 (1.6)	43.6 (27.1)	｜		Chikusei
Ōtagō 大田郷	3.7 (2.3)	47.3 (29.4)	｜		Chikusei
Shimodate 下館	3.8 (2.4)	51.1 (31.8)	●	■ Mito Line; ■ Mooka Line	Chikusei

== Rolling stock ==
- KiHa 0 series (ex-JNR KiHa 20)
- KiHa 100 series (driver-only-operation version of KiHa 300)
- KiHa 300 series (ex-JNR KiHa 30)
- KiHa 310 series (ex-JNR KiHa 16/17)
- KiHa 350 series (ex-JNR KiHa 30/35/36) (1987–2012)
- KiHa 2100 series (introduced 1993)
- KiHa 2200 series (introduced 1997)
- KiHa 2300 series (introduced 2000)
- KiHa 2400 series (introduced 2004)
- KiHa 5000 series (introduced 2009)
- KiHa 5010 series (from February 2017)
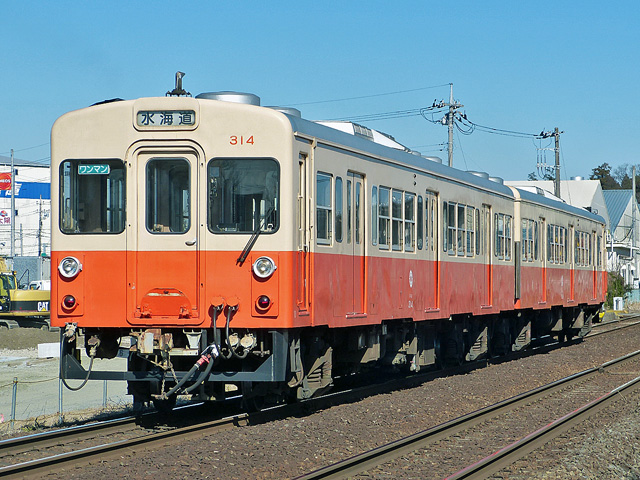
A KiHa 310 series DMU in February 2017

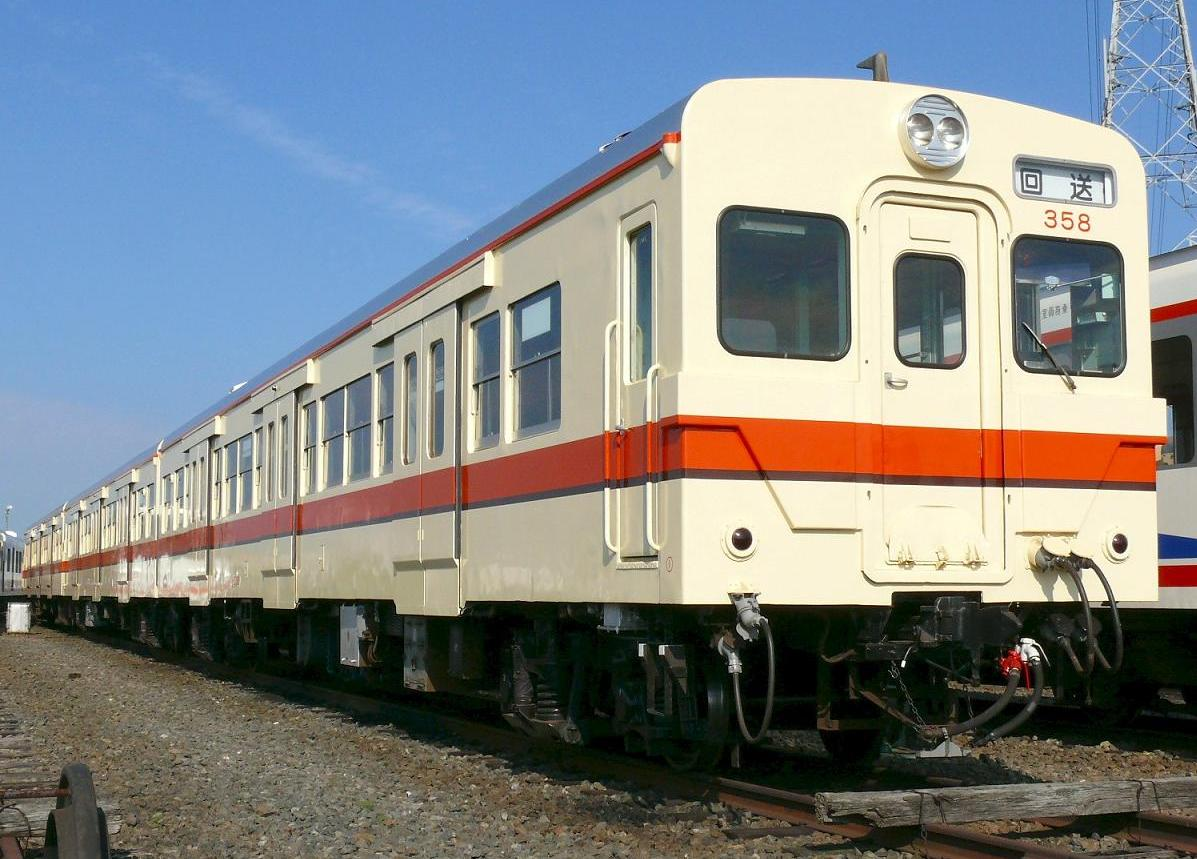
A KiHa 350 series DMU in November 2007

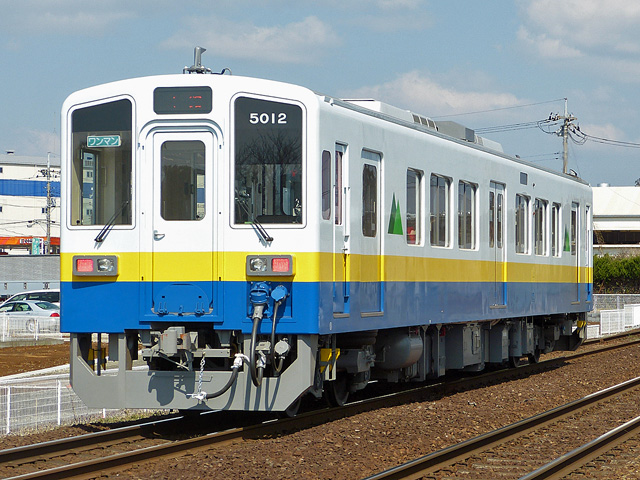
KiHa 5010 series DMU car 5012 in March 2017

== History ==
The Jōsō Railway opened the line on 1 November 1913. In 1945, the company merged with the Tsukuba Railway to form the Jōsō Tsukuba Railway, which merged with the Kanto Railway in 1965.

Originally all single-track, 17.5 kilometres (11 mi) of the line was doubled between Toride and Mitsukaidō by 15 November 1984. However, due to the limitations brought by the Kakioka Magnetic Observatory located in Ishioka, this line is still not electrified.

The KiHa 310 vehicles are scheduled for withdrawal in July 2023.
