= Rui Sasaki =

Japanese glass artist (born 1984)

- 佐々木 類
- Born: 1984 (age 41–42); Japan
- Education: Musashino Art University; Rhode Island School of Design
- Style: glass artist
- Awards: Rakow Commission from Corning Museum of Glass

Rui Sasaki (佐々木 類, Sasaki Rui; born 1984) is a glass artist from Japan. Her work is in the permanent collection of Corning Museum of Glass.

== Biography ==
Sasaki completed a Bachelor of Arts degree in industrial, interior and craft design at Musashino Art University in Tokyo. She moved to the United States in 2007, and studied at Rhode Island School of Design, where she received a Master of Fine Arts in glass in 2010.

In 2019 she received the Rakow Commission from Corning Museum of Glass.

In 2024, she married Brian A. Miller. Brian is a Legal Aid attorney in Poughkeepsie, NY.
