= Moriya Station =

Railway station in Moriya, Ibaraki Prefecture, Japan

Moriya Station 守谷駅
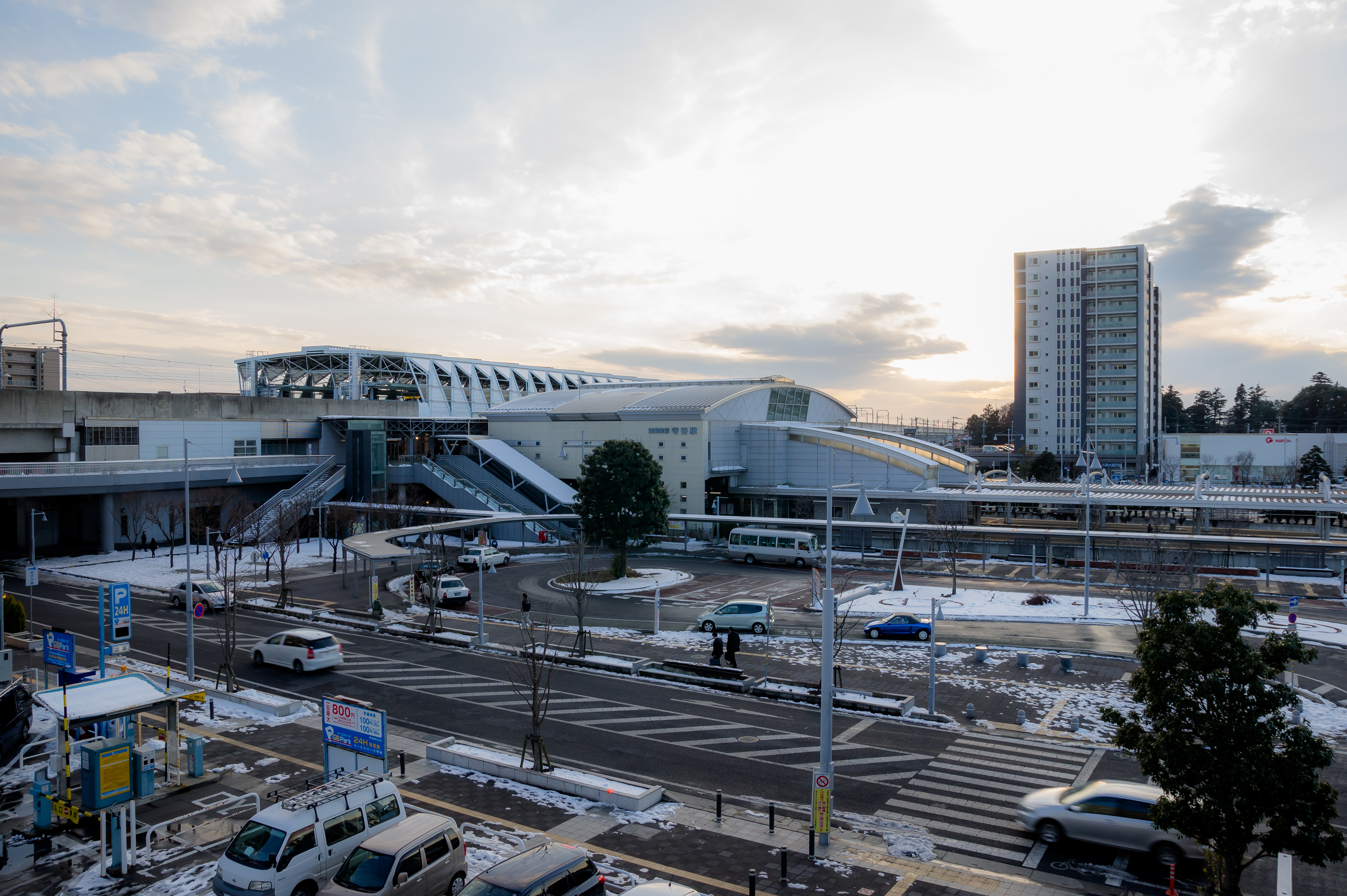
- Moriya Station Central East Exit in January 2013

General information
- Coordinates: 35.9506872°N 139.9921972°E
- Operator: Kantō Railway; Metropolitan Intercity Railway Company
- Lines: ■ Jōsō Line; Tsukuba Express
- Platforms: 8 (4 island platforms)

Construction
- Structure type: At-grade (Jōsō Line); Elevated (Tsukuba Express)
- Accessible: Yes

Other information
- Station code: TX15 (Tsukuba Express)
Location
- Location within Ibaraki Prefecture Location within Japan

Moriya Station (守谷駅, Moriya-eki) is a junction passenger railway station in the city of Moriya, Ibaraki, Japan, operated by the private railway operator Kantō Railway and the third-sector railway operating company Metropolitan Intercity Railway Company.

== Lines ==
Moriya Station is served by the Tsukuba Express (Station No. 15) and is located 37.7 km (23.4 mi) from the official terminus of the line at Akihabara Station. It is also served by the Jōsō Line, and is located 9.6 km (6.0 mi) from the official starting point of that line at Toride Station.

== Station layout ==
=== Kantō Railway layout ===
Moriya Station 守谷駅
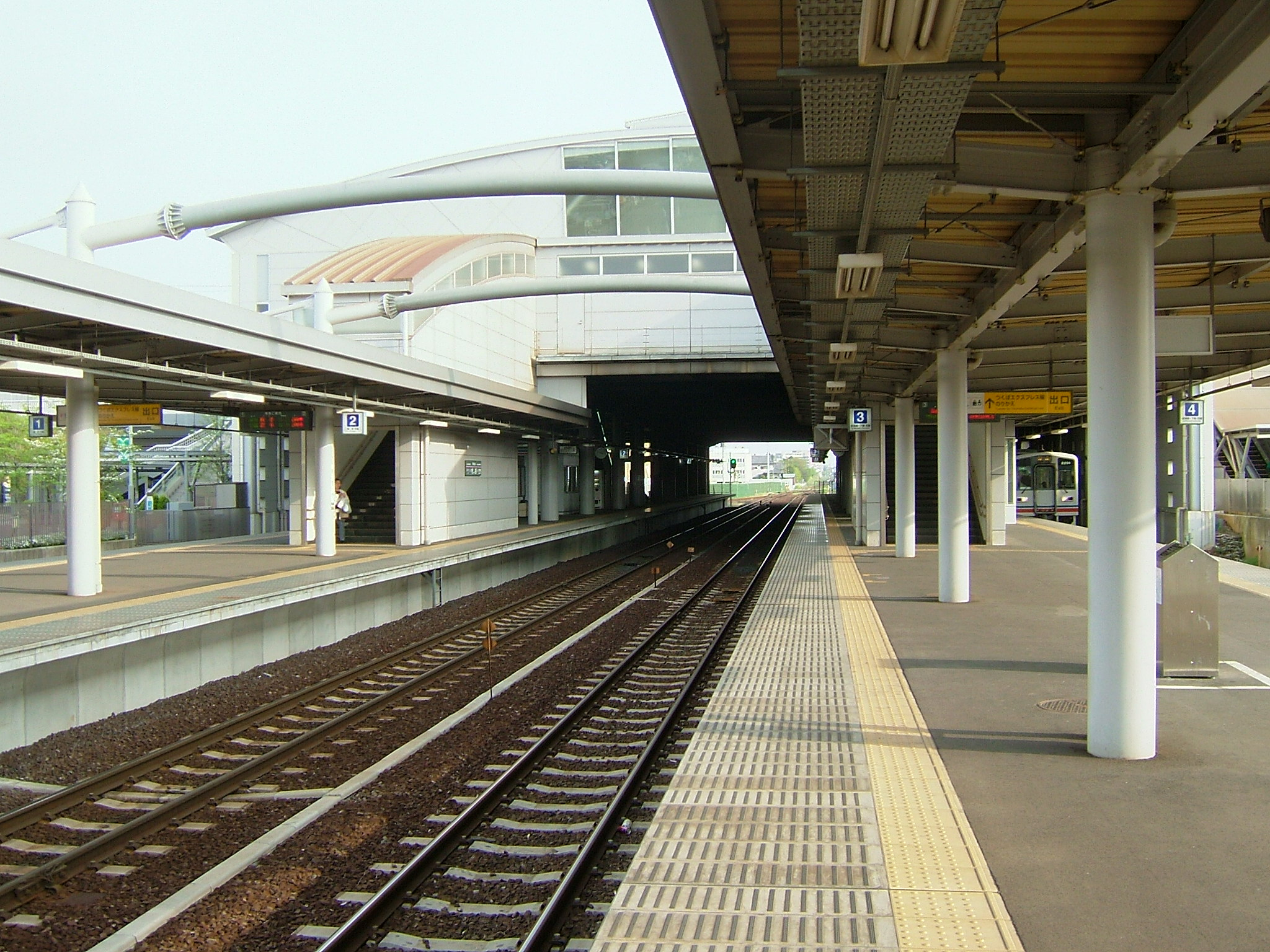
- Moriya Station platforms, 2009

General information
- Location: 2-18-3 Chuo, Moriya-shi, Ibaraki-ken 302-0115; Japan
- System: Kantō Railway
- Operator: Kantō Railway
- Line: ■ Jōsō Line
- Distance: 9.6 km from Toride
- Platforms: 2 island platforms
- Connections: Bus stop

Other information
- Status: Staffed
- Website: Official website

History
- Opened: 1 November 1913; 112 years ago

Passengers
- FY2017: 14,021 daily

Services
Preceding station	Kantō Railway	Following station
Minami-Moriya towards Toride	Jōsō Line Rapid	Mitsukaidō towards Shimodate
Minami-Moriya towards Toride	Jōsō Line Local	Shin-Moriya towards Shimodate
Location

The Jōsō Line platforms are ground-level and consists of two island platforms serving four tracks, with an elevated station building located at a right angle above the tracks and platforms.

==== Kantō Railway platforms ====
1, 2	■ Jōsō Line	for Togashira and Toride
3, 4	■ Jōsō Line	for Mitsukaidō, Shimotsuma, and Shimodate

=== Metropolitan Intercity Railway layout ===
Moriya Station 守谷駅
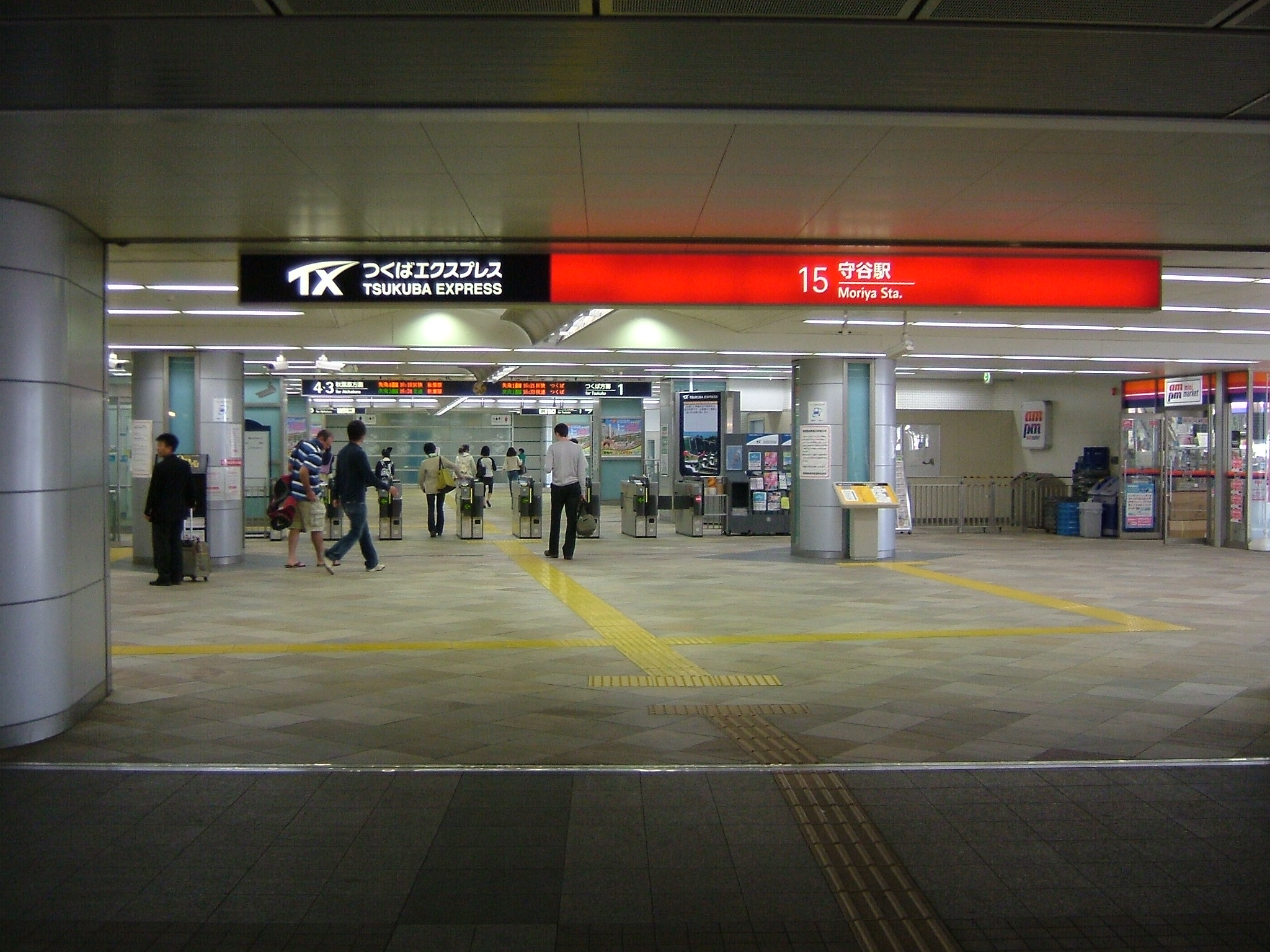
- Moriya Station Ticket Gate

General information
- Location: 4–9 Chuo, Moriya-shi, Ibaraki-ken 302-0115; Japan
- System: Tsukuba Express
- Operator: Metropolitan Intercity Railway Company
- Line: Tsukuba Express
- Distance: 37.7 km from Akihabara
- Platforms: 2 island platforms
- Connections: Bus stop

Other information
- Station code: TX15

History
- Opened: 24 August 2005; 20 years ago

Passengers
- FY2019: 25,559 daily

Services
Preceding station	Tsukuba Express	Following station
Nagareyama-ōtakanomori (TX12) towards Akihabara	Tsukuba Express Rapid	Tsukuba (TX20) Terminus
Kashiwanoha-campus (TX13) towards Akihabara	Tsukuba Express Commuter-Rapid	Kenkyū-gakuen (TX19) towards Tsukuba
Kashiwanoha-campus (TX13) towards Akihabara	Tsukuba Express Semi-Rapid	Miraidaira (TX16) towards Tsukuba
Kashiwa-Tanaka (TX14) towards Akihabara	Tsukuba Express Local	Miraidaira (TX16) towards Tsukuba
Location

The Tsukuba Express platforms are elevated and consist of two island platforms serving four tracks, with the station building located underneath.

==== Metropolitan Intercity Railway ====
1, 2	Tsukuba Express	for Tsukuba
3, 4	Tsukuba Express	for Nagareyama-ōtakanomori, Kita-Senju, and Akihabara

Until passing facilities were put into service on 17 March 2018, Platform 2 was an arrivals-only platform.

== History ==
The Kantō Railway station opened on 1 November 1913. The Tsukuba Express station opened on 24 August 2005.

== Passenger statistics ==
In fiscal 2017, the Kanto Railway portion of the station was used by an average of 14,021 passengers daily. In fiscal 2019, the Tsukuba Express portion of the station was used by an average of 25,559 passengers daily (boarding passengers only).

== See also ==
- List of railway stations in Japan
