= Toride Station =

Railway station in Toride, Ibaraki Prefecture, Japan

JJ10 JL32 Toride Station 取手駅
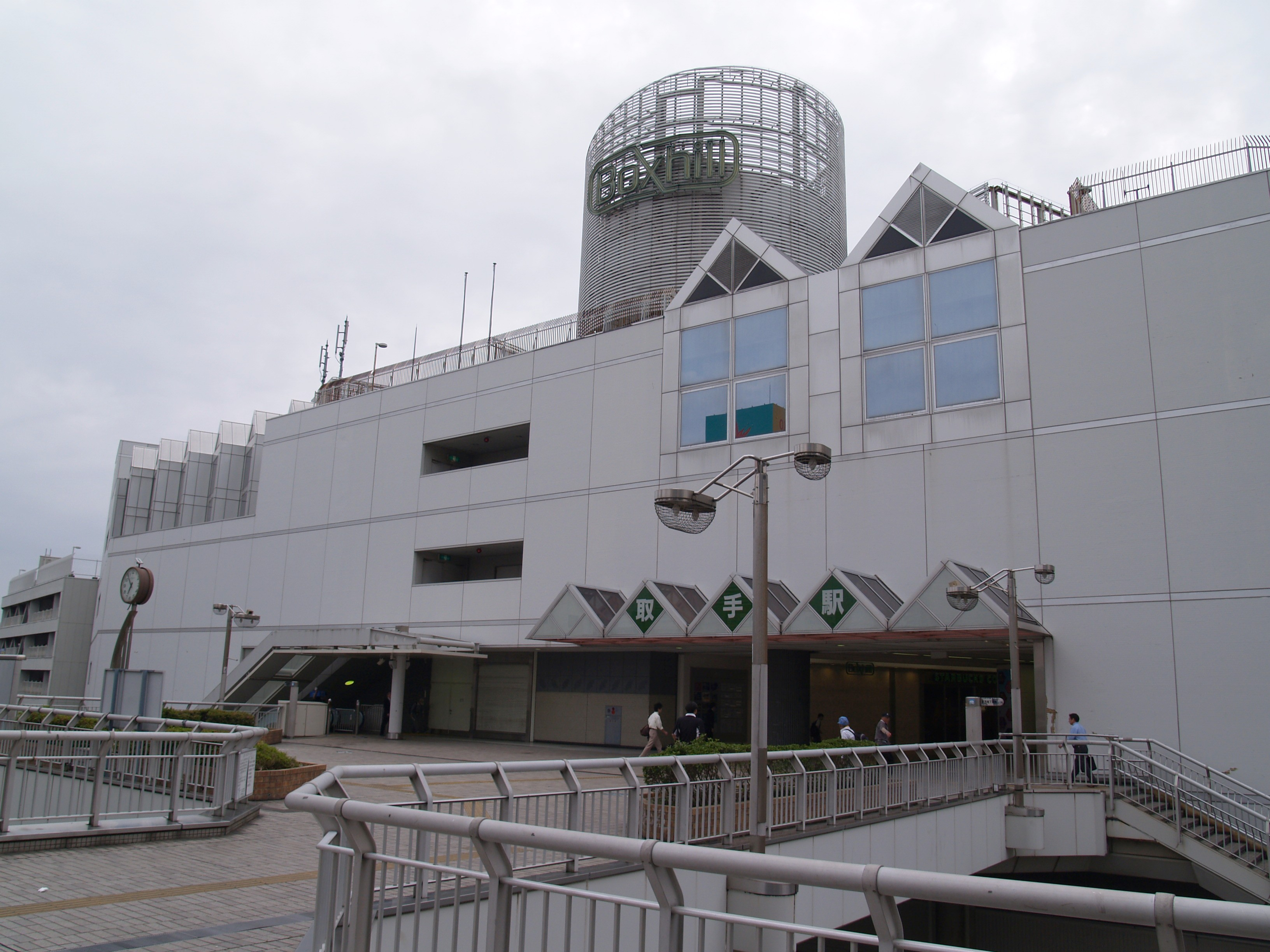
- Toride Station west entrance, June 2010

General information
- Location: 2 Chūō-chō, Toride-shi, Ibaraki-ken 302-0014; Japan
- Coordinates: 35°53′47″N 140°03′47″E
- Operator: JR East; Kantō Railway
- Lines: ■ Jōban Line; ■ Jōsō Line
- Distance: 51.1 km from Nippori
- Platforms: 4 island platforms

Other information
- Status: Staffed (Midori no Madoguchi )
- Website: Official website

History
- Opened: 25 December 1896; 129 years ago6

Passengers
- 27,277 daily (JR FY2019); 11,506 (Kanto, FY2018)

Services
Preceding station	JR East	Following station
Kashiwa JJ07 towards Shinagawa	Jōban Line Special Rapid	Fujishiro towards Tsuchiura
Tennōdai JJ09 towards Shinagawa	Jōban Line (Rapid) Rapid	Terminus
Tennōdai JJ09 towards Shinagawa	Jōban Line Local-Futsuu	Fujishiro towards Sendai
Tennōdai JL31 (limited service) towards Ayase	Jōban Line (Local) Local-Kankō (limited service)	Terminus
Preceding station	Kantō Railway	Following station
Terminus	Jōsō Line Rapid; Local	Nishi-Toride towards Shimodate
Location
- Location within Ibaraki Prefecture Location within Japan

Toride Station (取手駅, Toride-eki) is a passenger railway station located in the city of Toride, Ibaraki Prefecture, Japan operated by the East Japan Railway Company (JR East). It is also shared by the private railway operator Kantō Railway.

== Lines ==
Toride Station is served by the Jōban Line, and is located 37.4 km (23.2 mi) from the official starting point of the line at Nippori Station. It is a terminus of the 51.1 km (31.8 mi) Jōsō Line of the Kantō Railway.

== Station layout ==
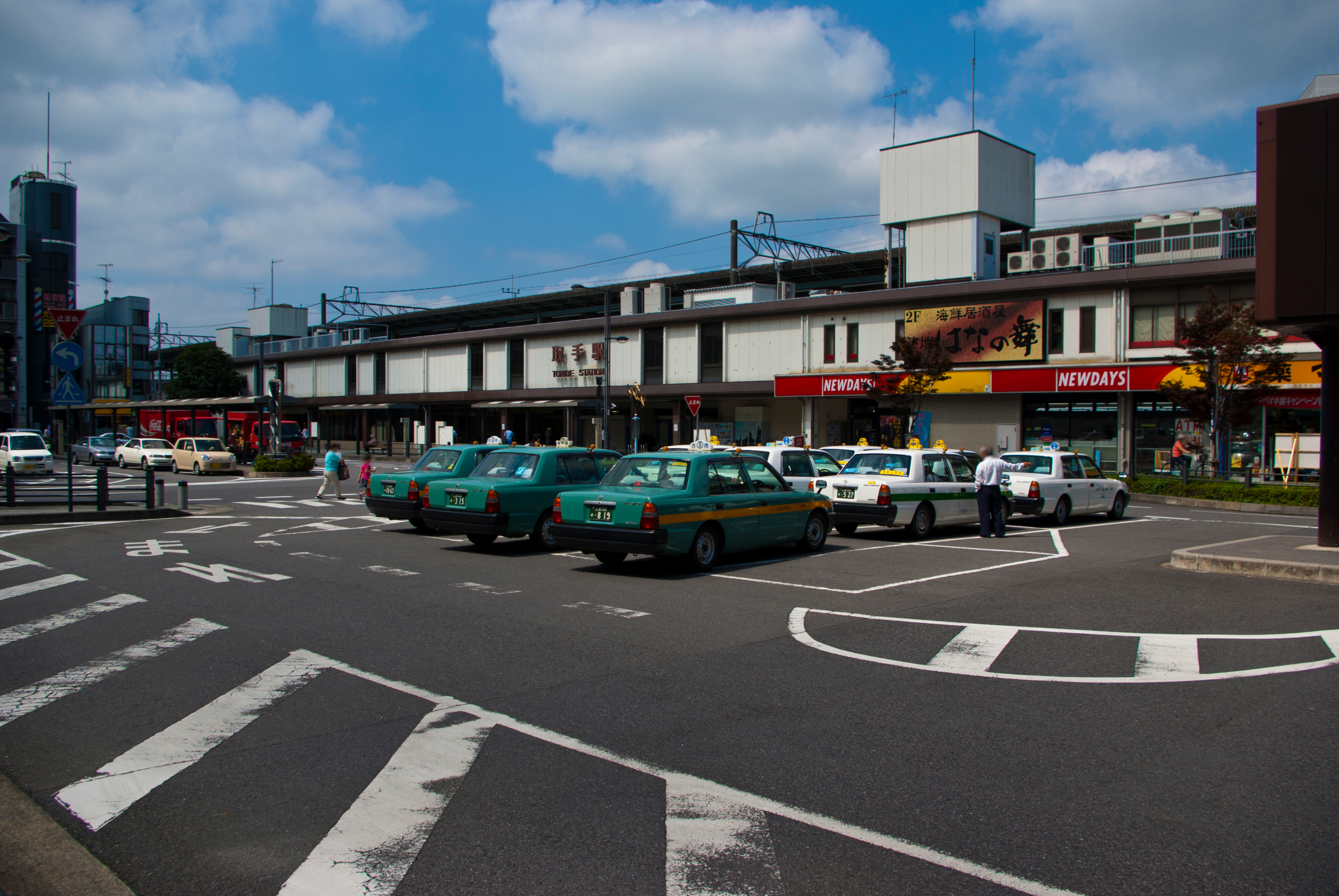
Toride Station east entrance, June 2009

The JR East portion of the station has three elevated island platforms serving six tracks. The station has a Midori no Madoguchi staffed ticket office. The Kantō Railway portion of the station has a single ground level island platform.

=== Platforms ===
1/2	Jōban Line (Local)	for Abiko, Kashiwa, Matsudo and Ayase; Tokyo Metro Chiyoda Line for Kita-senju, Nishi-Nippori and Yoyogi-uehara
3/4	Jōban Line (Rapid)	for Kashiwa, Matsudo, and Ueno; Ueno-Tokyo Line for Tokyo and Shinagawa
5	Jōban Line (Rapid)	for Kashiwa, Matsudo, and Ueno; Ueno-Tokyo Line for Tokyo and Shinagawa
5	■ Jōban Line	for Tsuchiura, Ishioka, Mito, Takahagi, and Iwaki
6	■ Jōban Line	for Tsuchiura, Ishioka, Mito, Takahagi, and Iwaki
7/8	■ Jōsō Line	for Moriya, Mitsukaido, and Shimodate

== History ==
The station opened on 25 December 1896. The station was absorbed into the JR East network upon the privatization of the Japanese National Railways (JNR) on 1 April 1987.

A 27-year-old Japanese man was arrested after stabbing 14 people outside of the west entrance of Toride Station on the morning of 17 December 2010. The suspect was alleged to have boarded a bus where he stabbed mostly high school and middle school students, before being subdued. None of the victims were seriously injured.

== Passenger statistics ==
In fiscal 2019, the JR portion of the station was used by an average of 27,277 passengers daily (boarding passengers only). In fiscal 2018, the Kanto Railway portion of the station was used by an average of 11,506 passengers daily (boarding passengers only).

== Surrounding area ==
- former Toride-shuku
- Toride Velodrome

== See also ==
- List of railway stations in Japan
