= Shimodate Station =

Railway station in Chikusei, Ibaraki Prefecture, Japan

Shimodate Station 下館駅
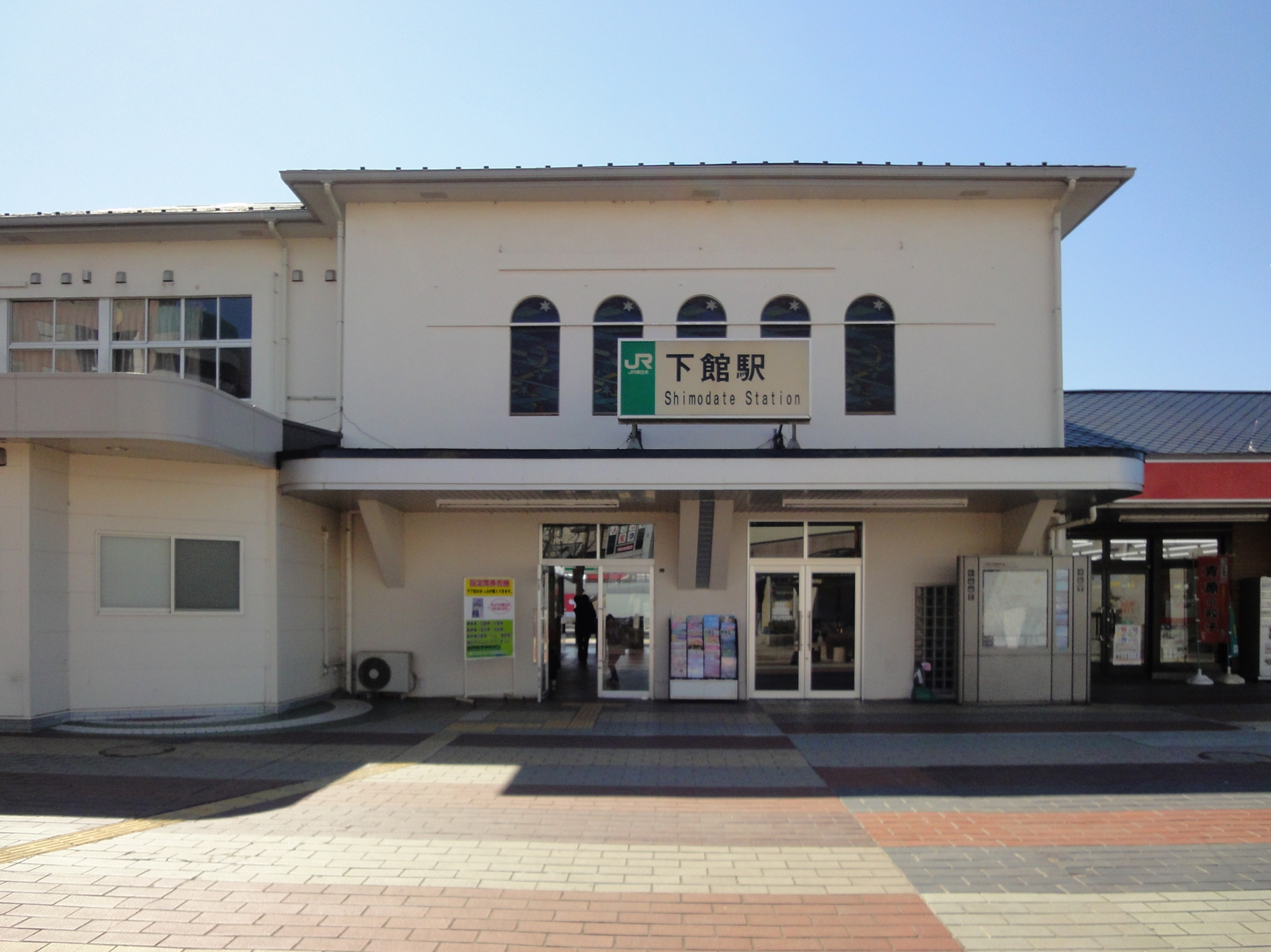
- Shimodate Station, March 2012

General information
- Location: Otsu 86, Chikusei-shi, Ibaraki-ken 308-0041; Japan
- Coordinates: 36.3037129°N 139.9783516°E
- Operator: JR East; Mooka Railway; Kantō Railway; JR Freight
- Lines: ■Mito Line; ■ Mooka Line; ■ Jōsō Line

Other information
- Status: Staffed (Midori no Madoguchi )
- Website: Official website

History
- Opened: 16 January 1889; 137 years ago

Services
Preceding station	JR East	Following station
Tamado towards Oyama	Mito Line	Niihari towards Mito
Preceding station	Kantō Railway	Following station
Shimotsuma towards Toride	Jōsō Line Rapid	Terminus
Ōtagō towards Toride	Jōsō Line Local	Terminus
Preceding station	Mooka Railway	Following station
Terminus	SL Mooka	Orimoto towards Motegi
Terminus	Mooka Line	Shimodate-Nikōmae towards Motegi
Location
- Location within Ibaraki Prefecture Location within Japan

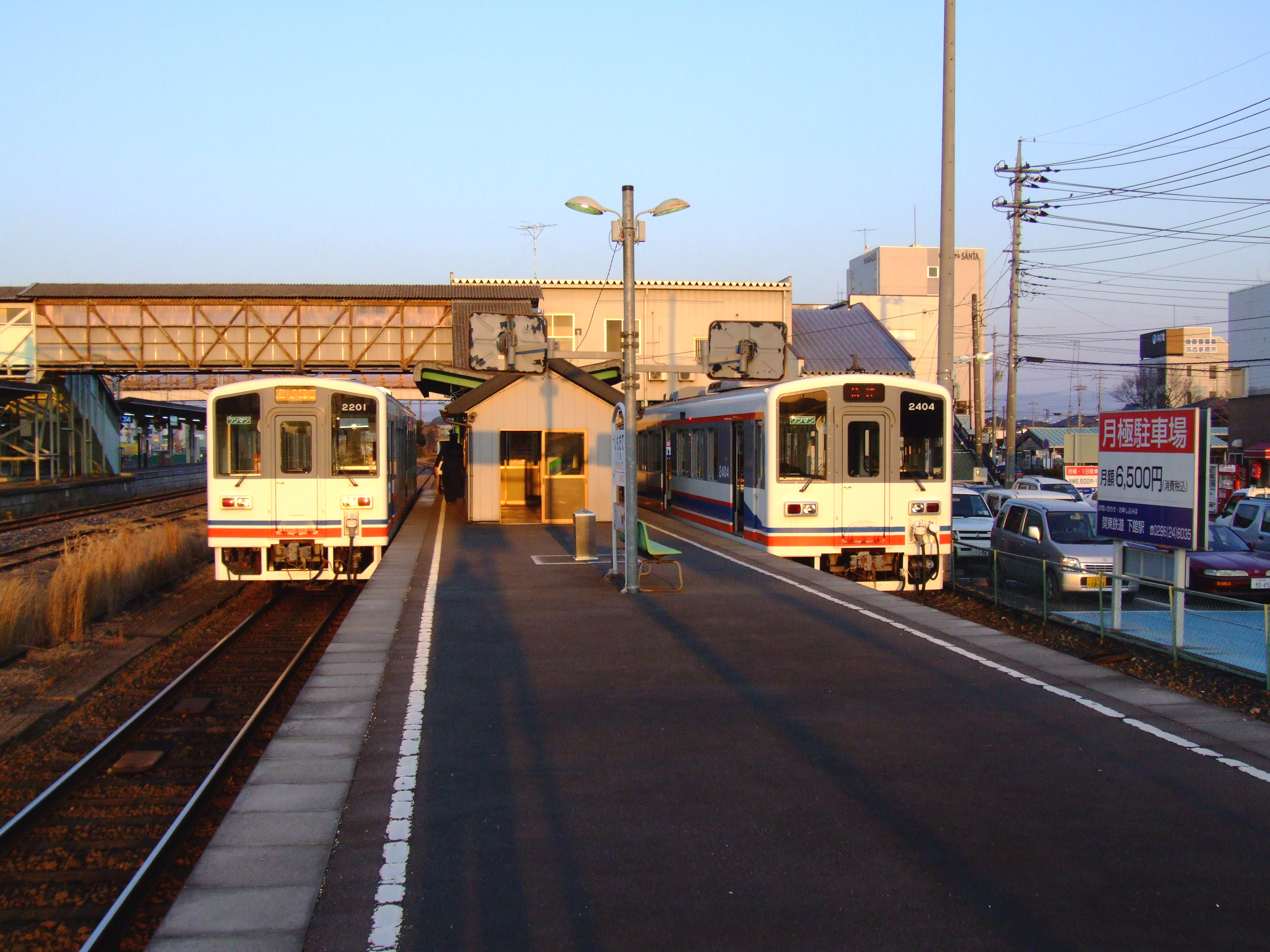
Kantō Railway platform

Shimodate Station (下館駅, Shimodate-eki) is a junction passenger railway station located in the city of Chikusei, Ibaraki Prefecture in Japan, operated by East Japan Railway Company (JR East), together with the private railway operator Kantō Railway and the third sector Mooka Railway. It is also a freight depot for the Japan Freight Railway Company (JR Freight).

== Lines ==
Shimodate Station is served by the JR East Mito Line, and is located 16.2 km (10.1 mi) from the official starting point of the line at Oyama Station. It is a terminus of the privately owned Mooka Railway’s Mooka Line and is also served by the Kantō Railway’s Jōsō Line.

== Station layout ==
Shimodate Station has two island platforms and one side platform all connected by footbridges. The side platform has a cutout on its west side, so that the three platforms serve a total of six tracks. The station has a Midori no Madoguchi ticket office.

=== Platforms ===
1	■ Mooka Railway Mooka Line	for Mōka, Mashiko and Motegi
2, 3	■ JR East Mito Line	for Kasama, Tomobe and Mito for Yūki and Oyama

4, 5	■ Kantō Railway Jōsō Line	for Shimotsuma, Moriya and Toride

== History ==
Shimodate Station was opened on 16 January 1889. The predecessor of the Mooka Railway began operations from 1 April 1912 and the Bōsō Railway (predecessor of the Kantō Railway) from 1 November 1913. The station was absorbed into the JR East network upon the privatization of the Japanese National Railways (JNR) on 1 April 1987.

== Passenger statistics ==
In fiscal 2019, the JR portion of station was used by an average of 3241 passengers daily (boarding passengers only). In Fiscal 2018, the Kanto Railway portion of the station was used by an average of 1253 passengers daily, and the Mooka Railway portion of the station by 662 passengers daily.

== Buses ==
- There is a bus route which runs from the station to Mount Tsukuba, the bus route name is 筑西市広域連携バス（Chikuseishi Koiki Renkei Bus）- Chikusei Municipal Conect Between Vicinities and Other Vicinities Bus

== Surrounding area ==
- National Route 50
- Chikusei City Office
- Simodate Post Office

== See also ==
- List of railway stations in Japan
