= Kantō Railway =

Railway operating company in Japan

Kanto Railway Co., Ltd.

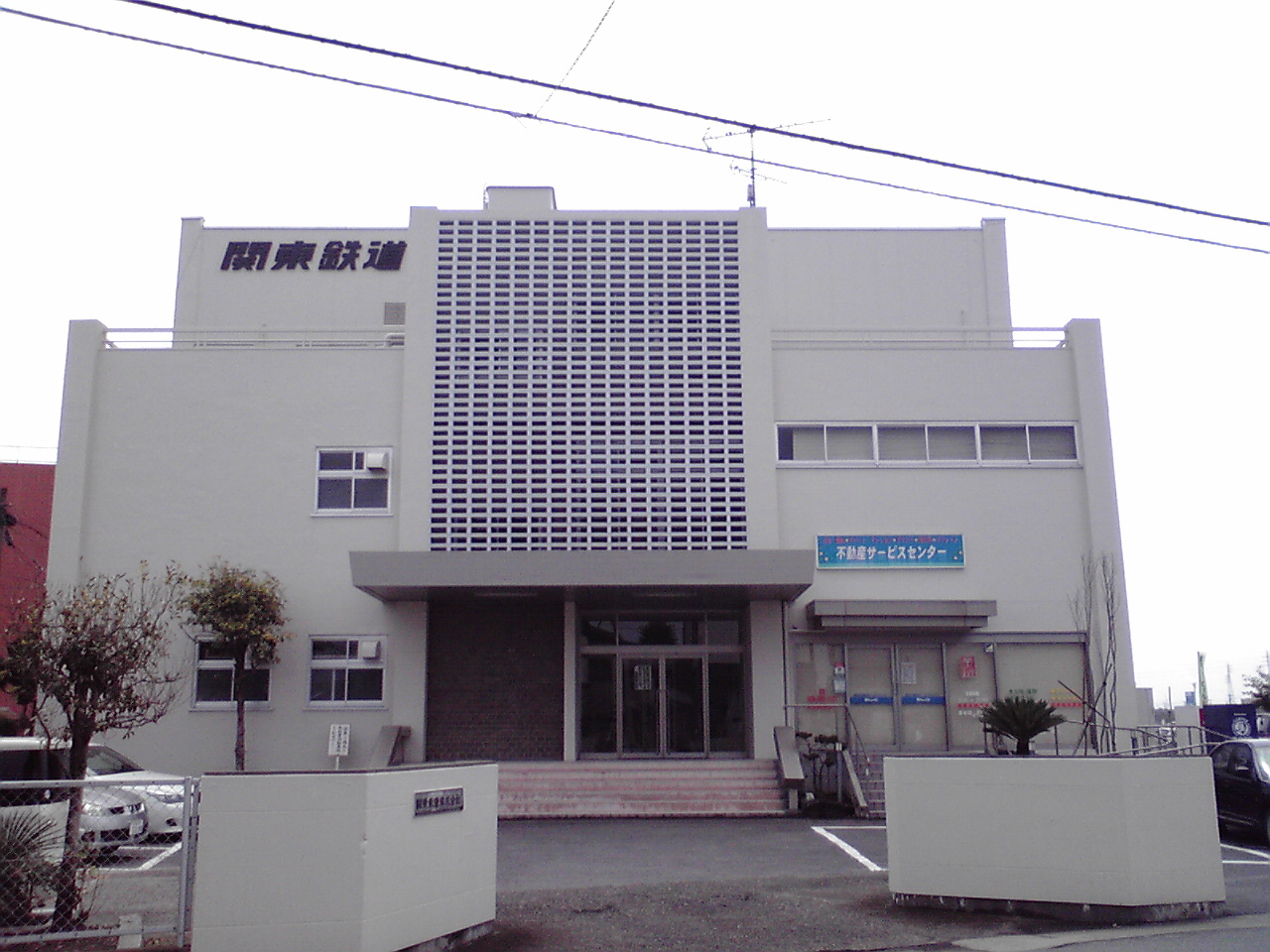
- Head office
- Parent: Keisei Electric Railway
- Founded: 3 September 1922
- Headquarters: 1-10-8 Manabe, Tsuchiura, Ibaraki, Japan
- Service area: Chiba, Ibaraki
- Service type: Bus and Train
- Fleet: 62 trains and 414 buses
- Chief executive: 松上 英一郎
- Website: Kanto Railway(in Japanese)

Kantō Railway (関東鉄道, Kantō Tetsudō) is a private railway company, which operates two raiiway lines in Ibaraki Prefecture in Japan. The company is a subsidiary of Keisei Electric Railway. Additionally, the company runs some routes buses and expressway bus chiefly at Ibaraki Prefecture and Chiba Prefecture in Japan.

== Overview ==
This company was established as Joso Railway in 1913. In 1945, Joso Railway was merged into Joso-Tsukuba Railway with Tsukuba Railway. Joso-Tsukuba Railway was split into Kanto Railway in 1965, which merged with Ryugasaki Railway. Around 1980, Tsukuba Railway (which would be suspended) and Kashima Railway (which would be replaced by the Keisei affiliated company Kashitetsu Bus) were split from Kanto Railway. Mount Tsukuba Cable Car and Mount Tsukuba Ropeway were transferred to Keisei Electric Railway. Kanto Railway has had a 0.01% investment in Metropolitan Intercity Railway Company since 2001.

== Trains ==
The company operates the following two lines:

- Jōsō Line
- Ryūgasaki Line

== Buses ==
This company manages route buses. But, chater bus is run by the following bus company

- Kantetsu Kankō Bus

=== Outline ===
Kanto Railway is also a bus company with coverage in the south and central Ibaraki and east Chiba. The bus department occupies 70% of benefit of the Kanto Railway. The company has ten offices and the service distance is 2,788.8 km.

The bus department used to have vast bus routes, but some were discontinued after proving unprofitable. Currently, certain discontinued bus routes have been revived as community buses operated by subsidiary bus companies (Kantetsu Green Bus, Kantetsu Purple Bus and Kantetsu Kankō Bus) in areas of Sakuragawa, Chikusei and more places.

The company has coverage of many attractions (Mount Tsukuba, Lake Kasumigaura, Kairakuen and so on), commercial facilities (Ami Premium Outlet, AeonMall Tsukuba and more), and a bed suburb of Tokyo (Tsukuba).

When many events are happening in Ibaraki, the company operates extra bus routes to Ibaraki Airport, Kashima Soccer Stadium and more.

Tickets can be purchased in stores at Mito Station (Ibaraki), Tsuchiura Station, Toride Station, Moriya Station, Tsukuba Station, Suigō-Itako Bus Terminal and more. Furthermore, there are ticket machines at the University of Tsukuba and Tsukuba Center.

=== Bus routes ===
==== Highway buses ====
- TSUKUBA
  - Tokyo Station or Haneda Airport - Tsukuba Center
- TM Liner
  - Tsukuba Center - Mito Station (Ibaraki)
- MITO
  - Tokyo Station - Mito Station (Ibaraki)
- KASHIMA
  - Tokyo Station or Haneda Airport - Tokyo Disney Resort - Suigō-Itako Bus Terminal - Kashima-Jingu Station
- Night bus
  - Mito Station (Ibaraki), Tsuchiura Station and Tsukuba Center - Kyoto Station and Namba Station

== Rolling stock ==
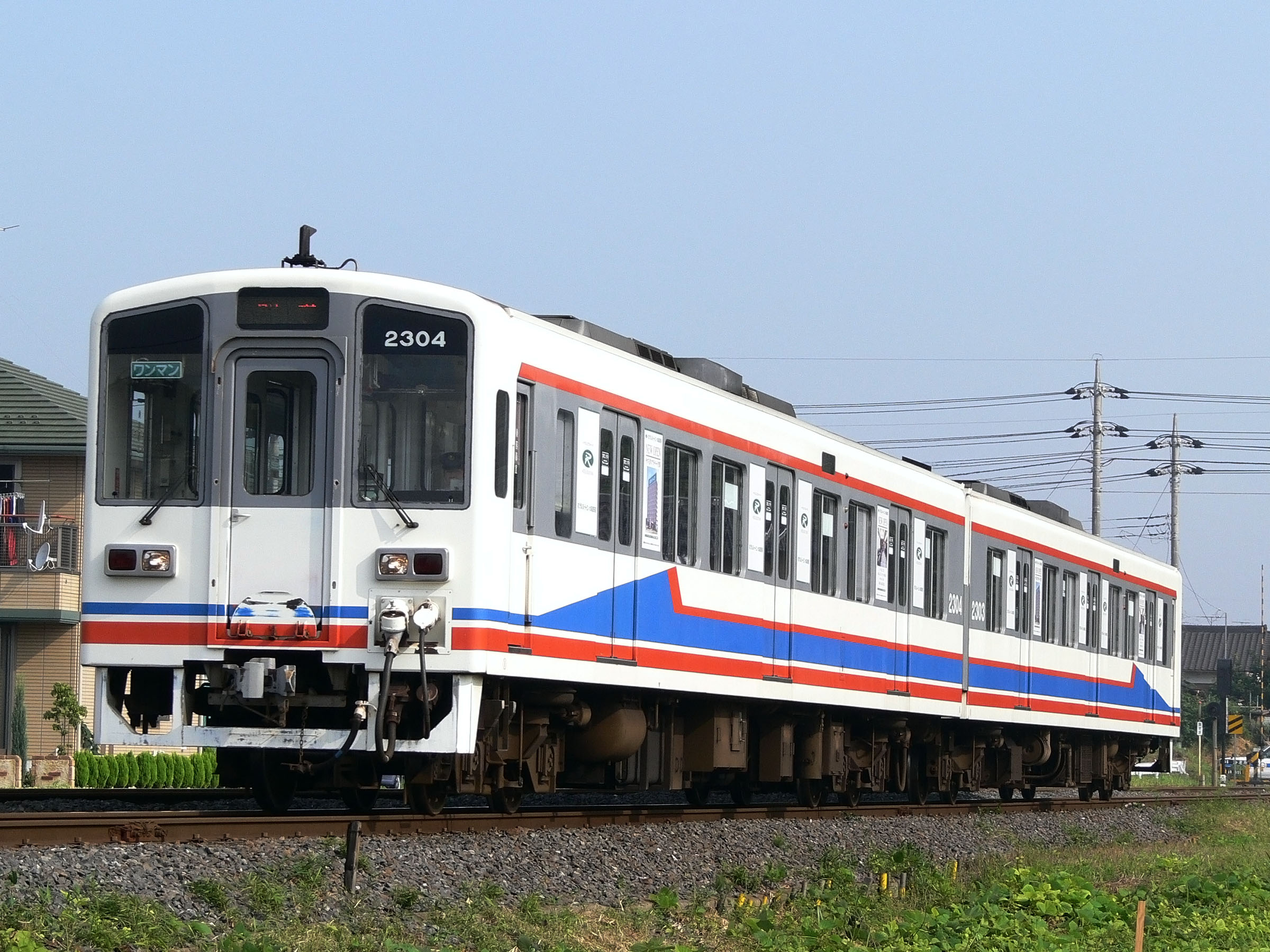
2300 series DMU

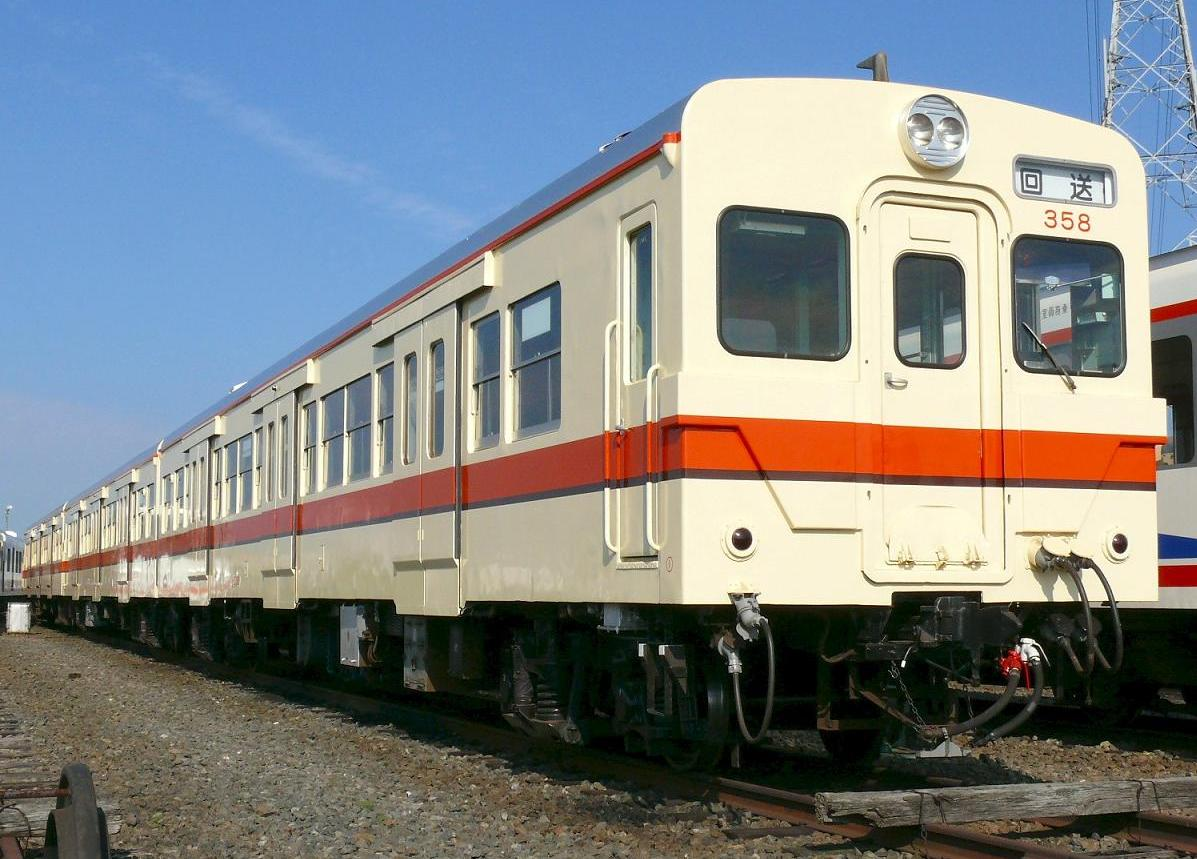
KiHa 350 DMU

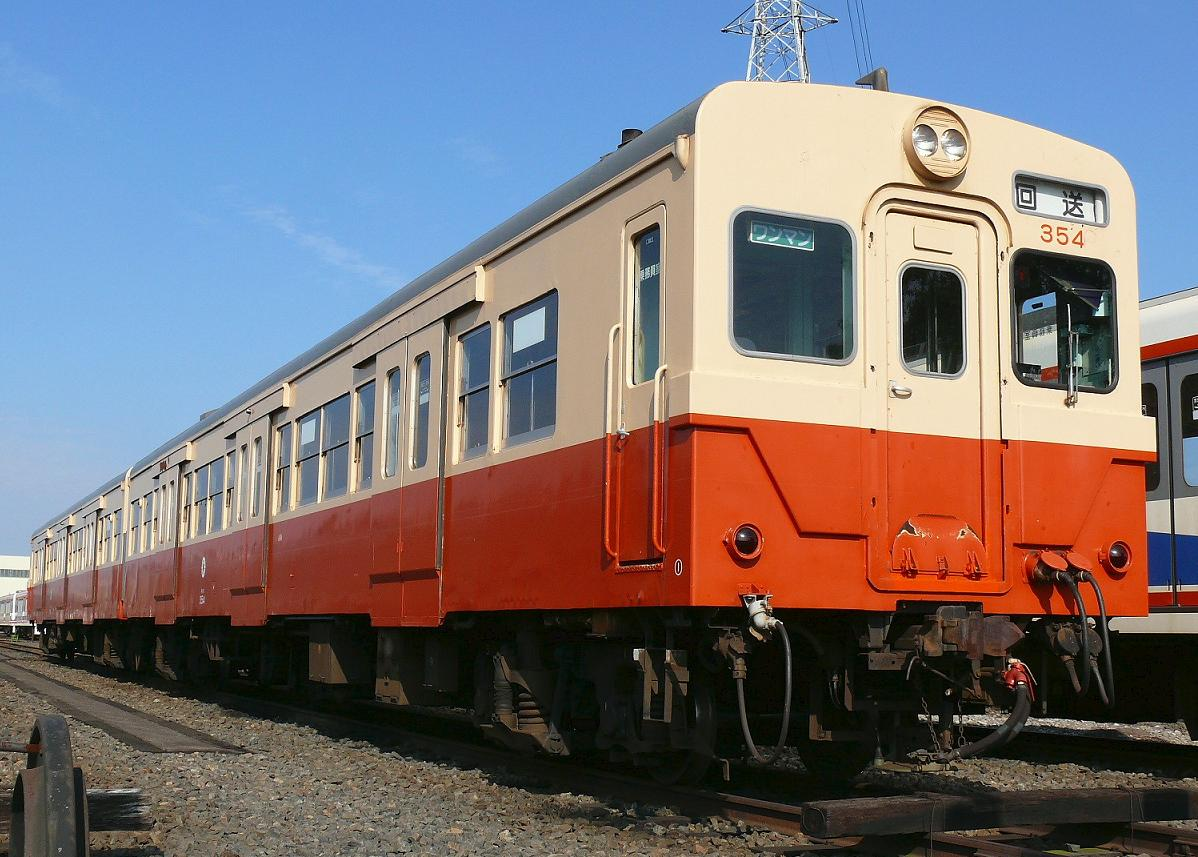
KiHa 350 DMU

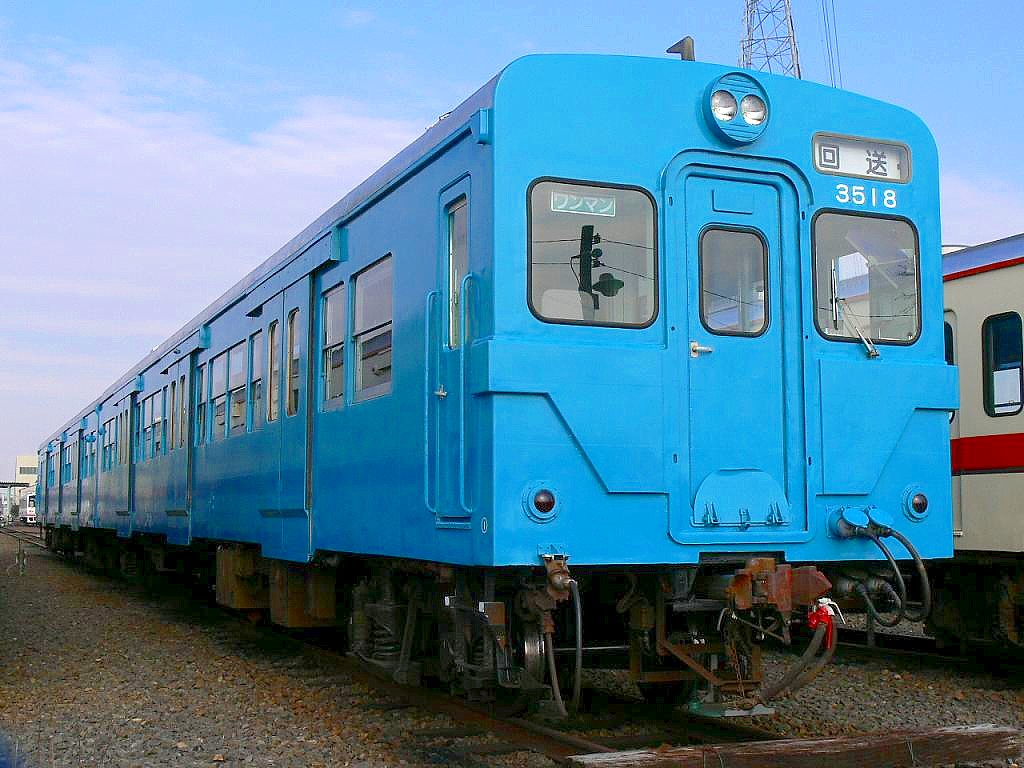
KiHa 300 DMU

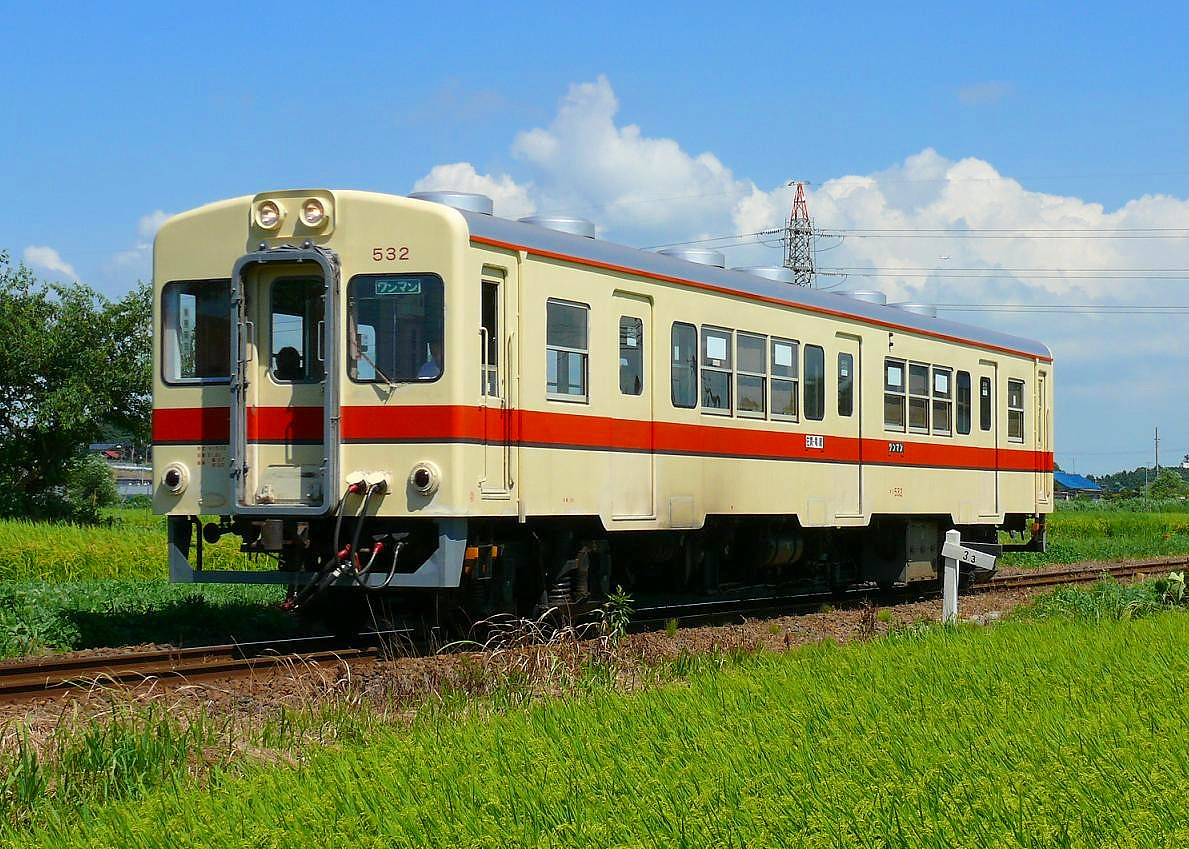
Ryūgasaki Line KiHa 530 DMU

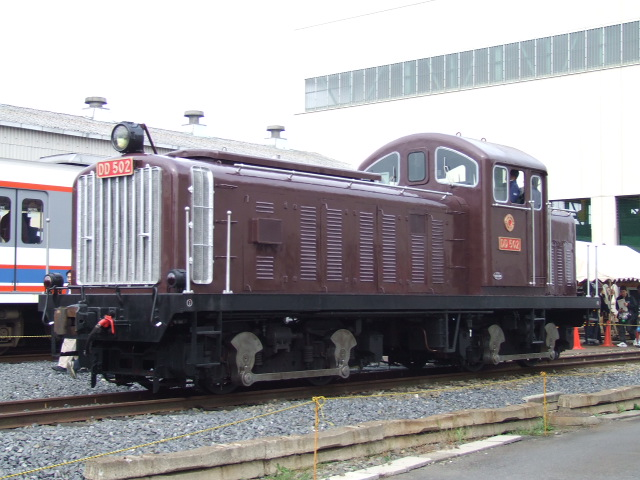
Diesel locomotive DD502

== See also ==
- Keisei Bus
- Kantetsu Green Bus&Kantetsu Purple Bus
- Tokyo BRT
