= List of cities in Ibaraki Prefecture by population =

The following list sorts all cities (including towns and villages) in the Japanese prefecture of Ibaraki with a population of more than 10,000 according to the 2020 Census. As of October 1, 2020, 42 places fulfill this criterion and are listed here. This list refers only to the population of individual cities, towns and villages within their defined limits, which does not include other municipalities or suburban areas within urban agglomerations.

== List ==
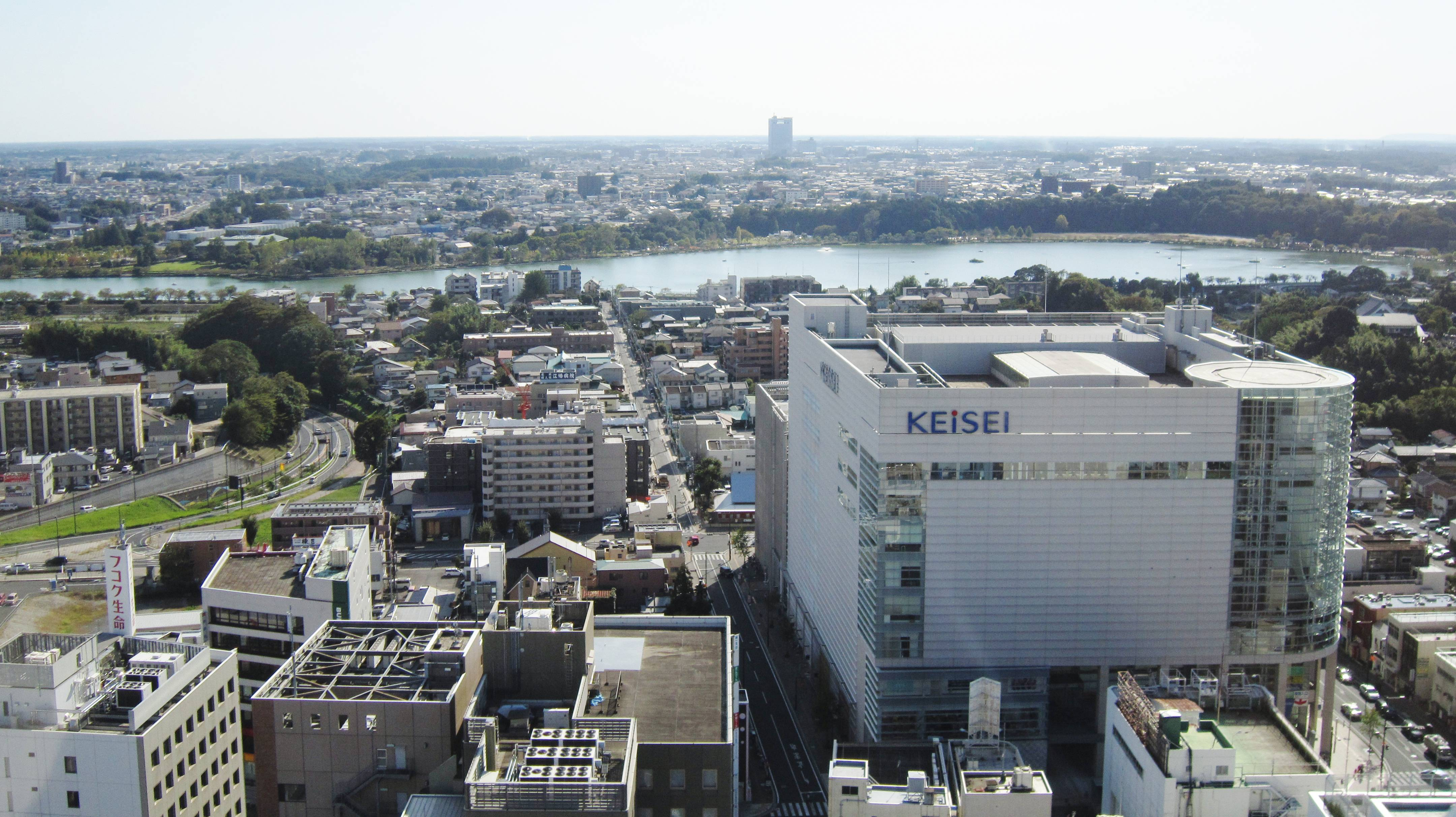
Mito

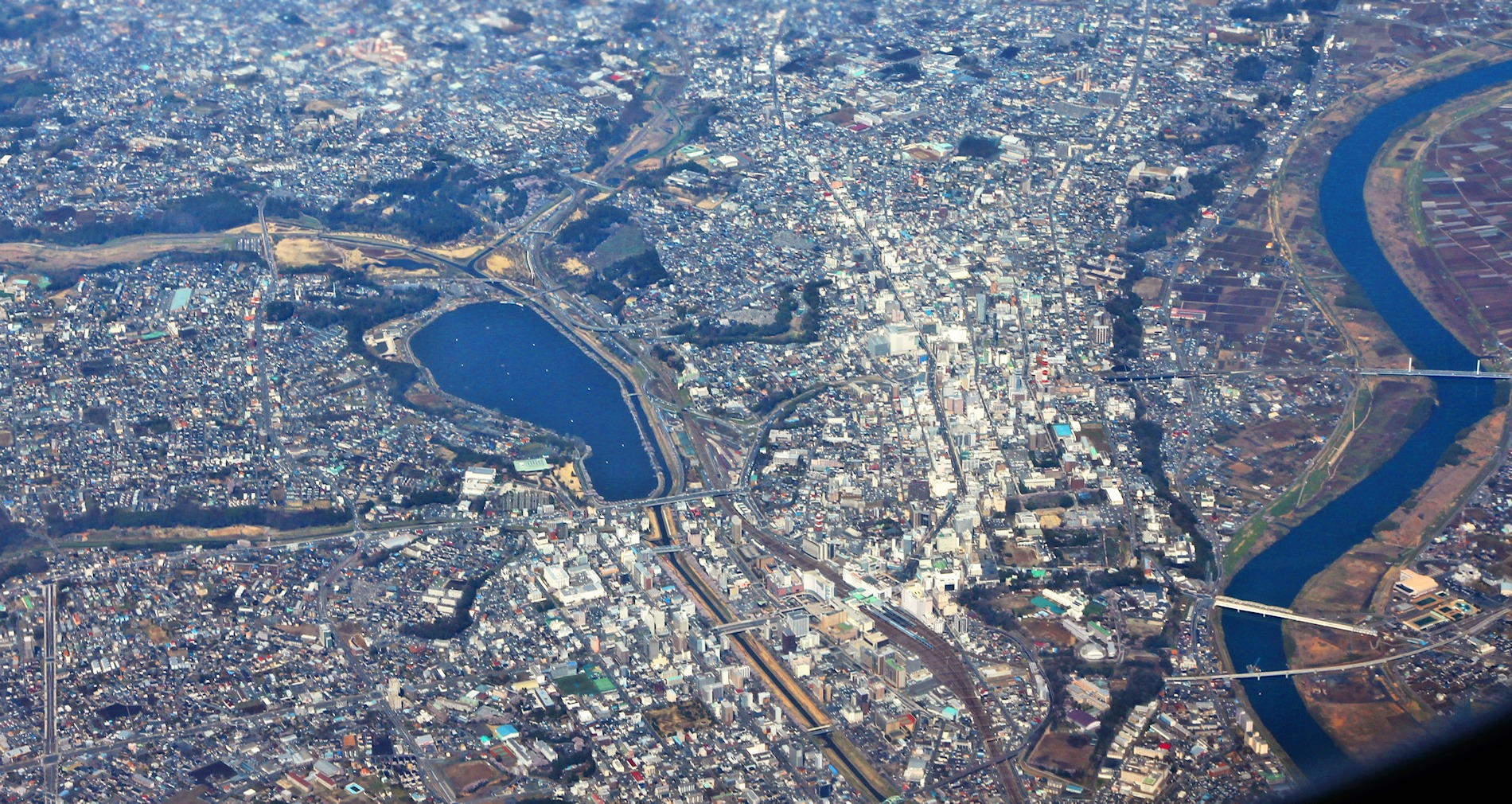
Mito aerial view

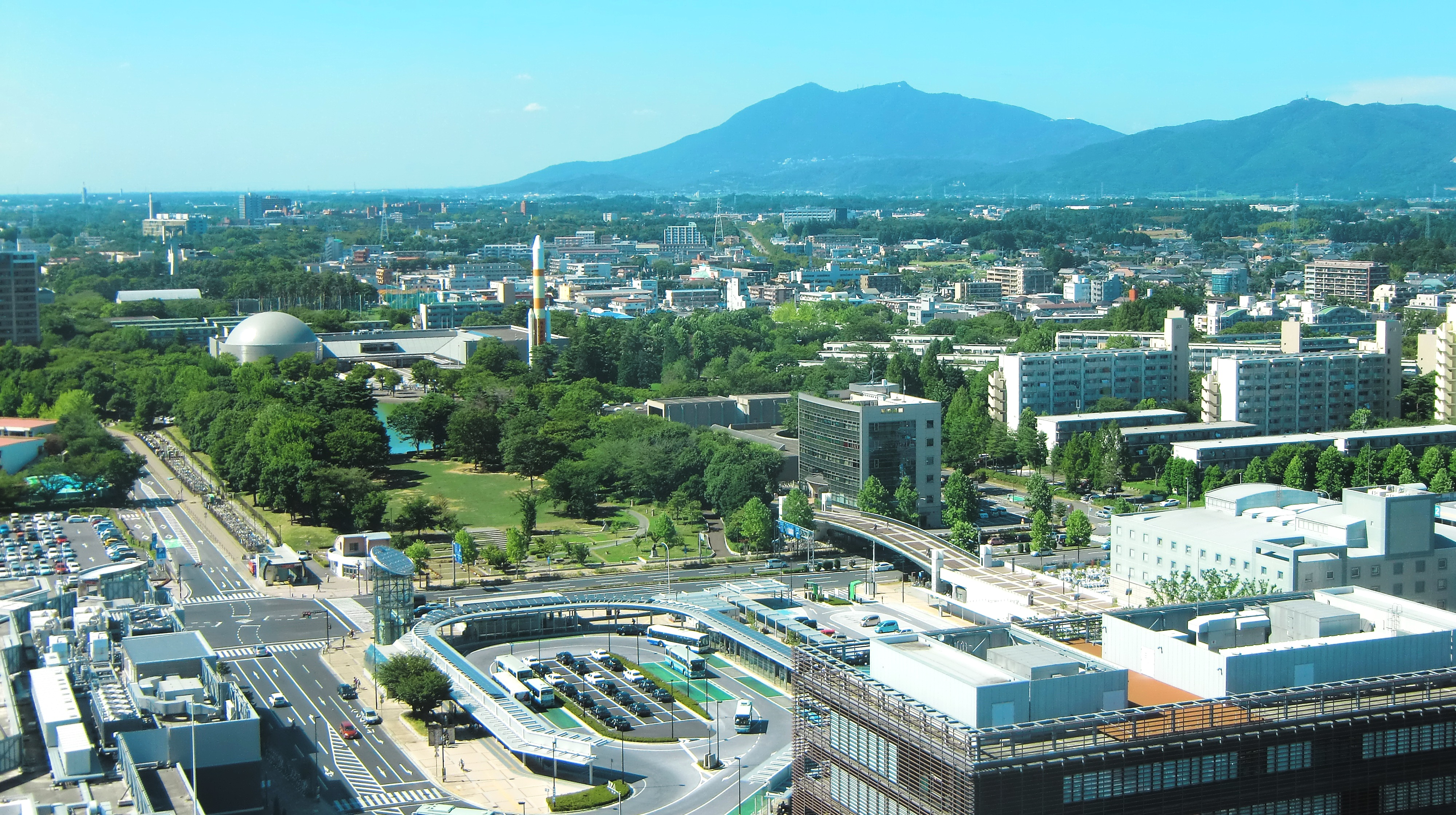
Tsukuba

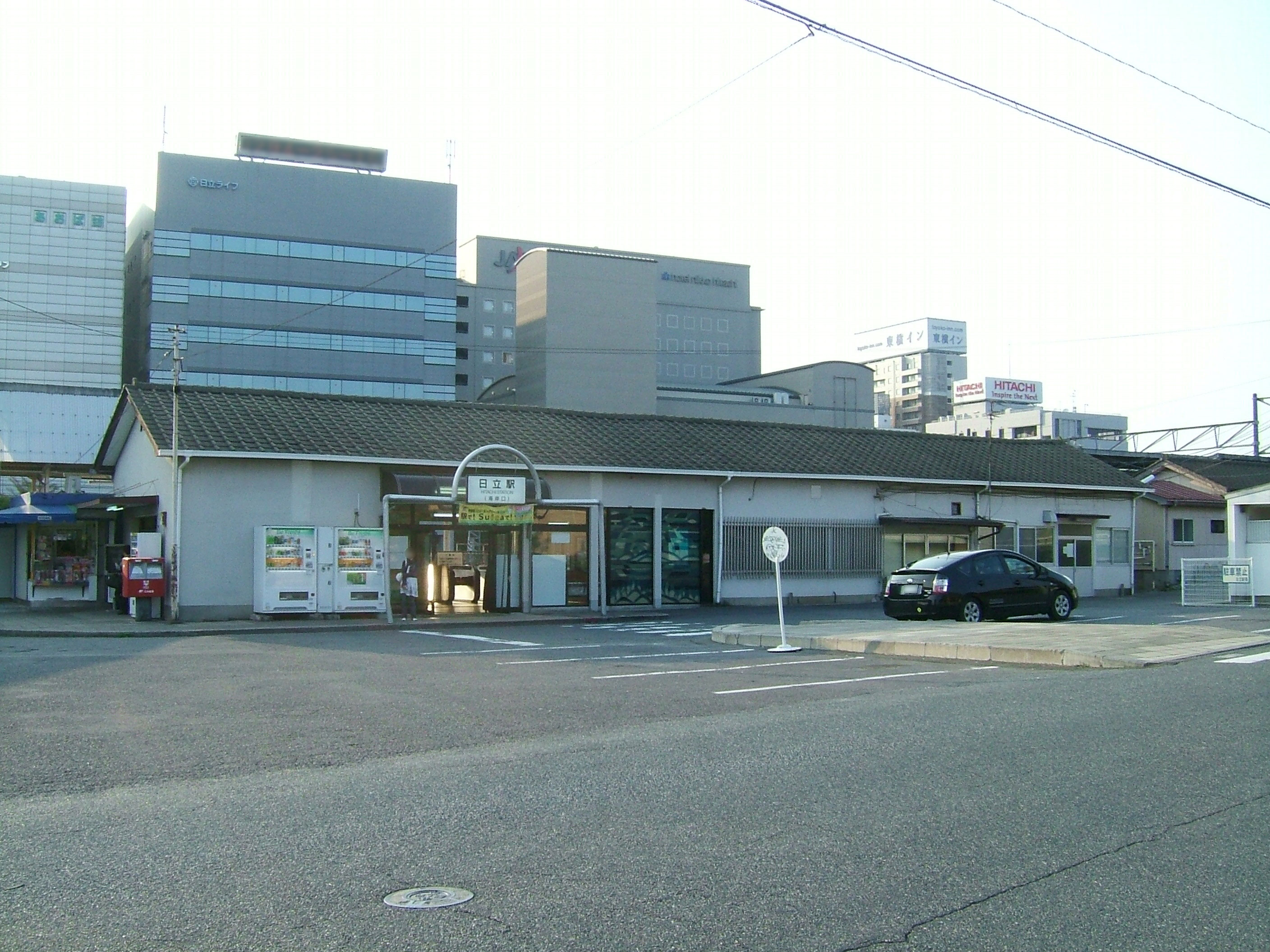
Hitachi

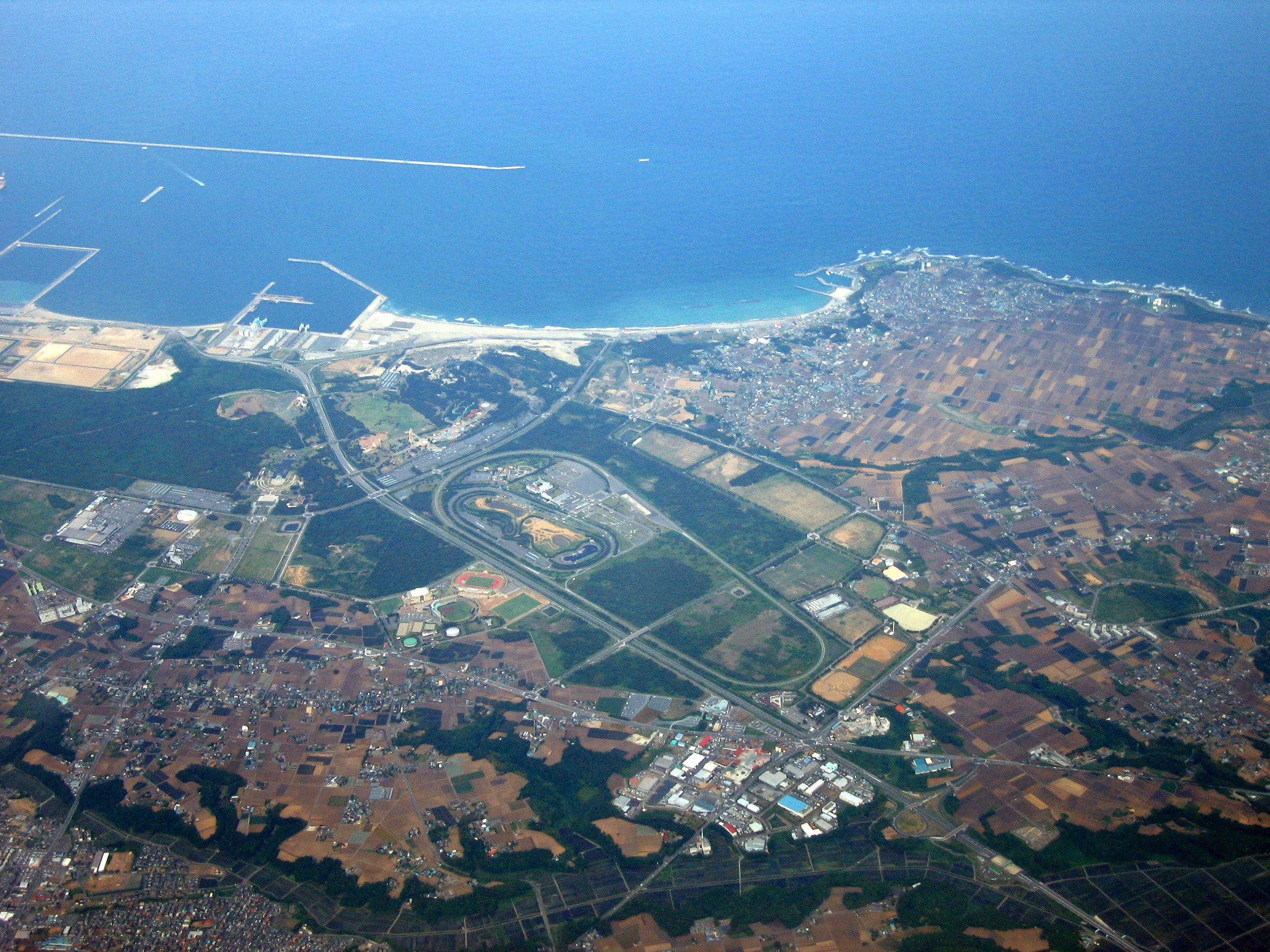
Hitachinaka aerial view

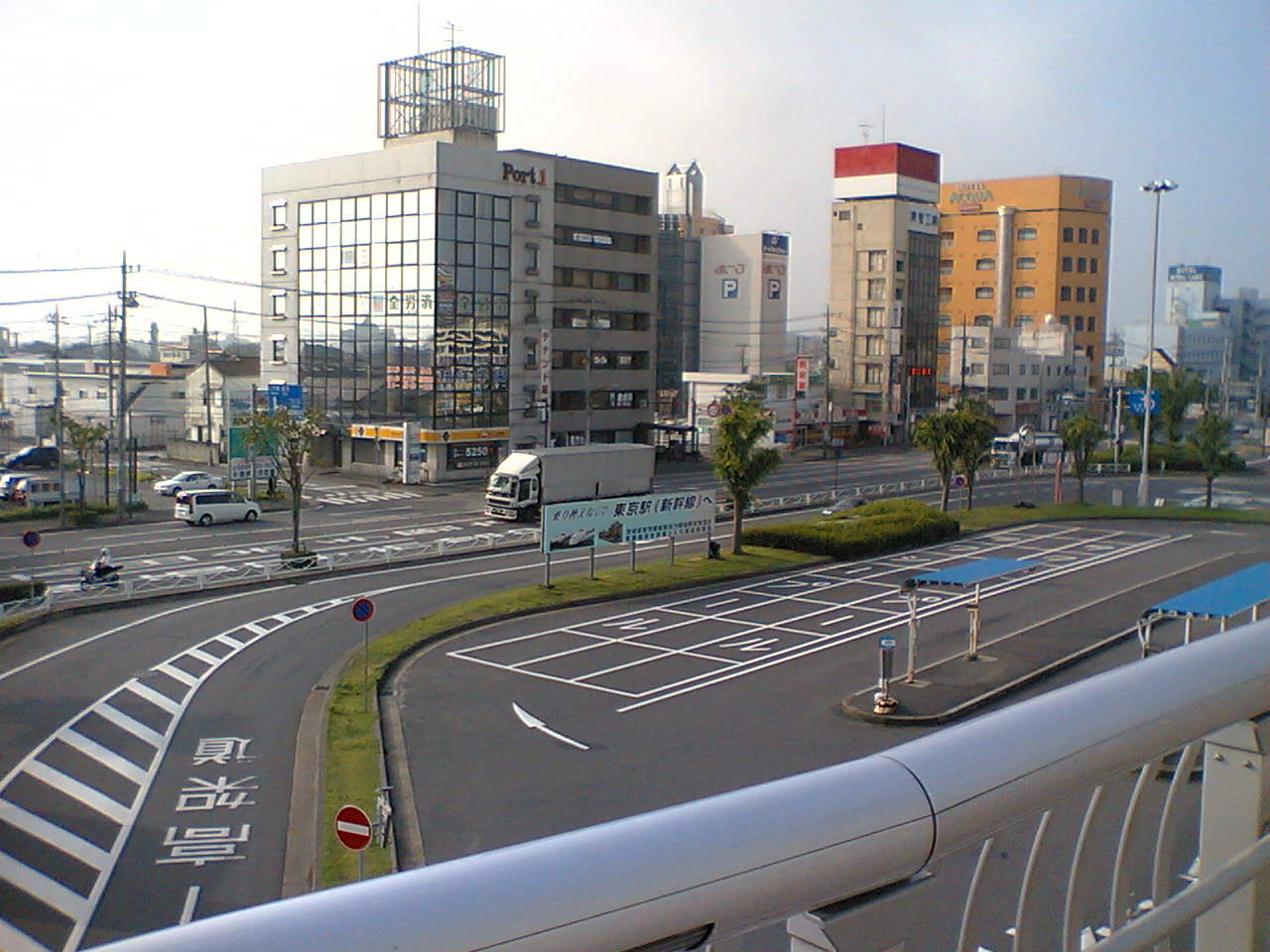
Tsuchiura

The following table lists the 42 cities, towns and villages in Ibaraki with a population of at least 10,000 on October 1, 2020, according to the 2020 Census. The table also gives an overview of the evolution of the population since the 1995 census.

Rank (2020)	Name	Status	2020	2015	2010	2005	2000	1995
1	Mito	City	270,810	270,783	268,750	262,603	261,562	261,275
2	Tsukuba	City	241,785	226,963	214,590	200,528	191,814	182,327
3	Hitachi	City	174,635	185,054	193,129	199,218	206,589	212,304
4	Hitachinaka	City	156,664	155,689	157,060	153,639	151,673	146,750
5	Tsuchiura	City	142,160	140,804	143,839	144,060	144,106	141,862
6	Koga	City	139,396	140,946	142,995	145,265	146,452	146,010
7	Toride	City	104,545	106,570	109,651	111,327	115,993	118,282
8	Chikusei	City	100,819	104,573	108,527	112,581	116,120	118,078
9	Kamisu	City	95,466	94,522	94,795	91,867	87,626	83,171
10	Ushiku	City	84,677	84,317	81,684	77,223	73,258	66,338
11	Ryūgasaki	City	76,455	78,342	80,334	78,950	76,923	69,163
12	Kasama	City	73,241	76,739	79,409	81,497	82,358	80,903
13	Ishioka	City	73,160	76,020	79,687	81,887	83,119	83,398
14	Moriya	City	68,426	64,753	62,482	53,700	50,362	45,821
15	Kashima	City	66,965	67,879	66,093	64,435	62,287	60,667
16	Jōsō	City	60,890	61,483	65,320	66,536	66,245	66,029
17	Naka	City	53,530	54,276	54,240	54,705	55,069	54,178
18	Bandō	City	52,292	54,087	56,114	57,516	58,673	59,738
19	Yūki	City	50,627	51,594	52,494	52,460	52,774	53,777
20	Tsukubamirai	City	49,898	49,136	44,461	40,174	40,532	40,495
21	Omitama	City	48,902	50,911	52,279	53,265	53,406	52,041
22	Hitachiōta	City	48,630	52,294	56,250	59,802	61,869	61,525
23	Ami	Town	48,578	47,535	47,940	47,994	46,922	45,652
24	Hokota	City	45,973	48,147	50,156	51,054	50,915	50,857
25	Shimotsuma	City	42,554	43,293	44,987	46,435	46,544	45,466
26	Kitaibaraki	City	41,836	44,412	47,026	49,645	51,593	52,074
27	Kasumigaura	City	40,114	42,147	43,553	44,603	45,229	45,288
28	Hitachiōmiya	City	39,294	42,587	45,178	47,808	48,964	49,561
29	Sakuragawa	City	39,159	42,632	45,673	48,400	50,334	51,972
30	Inashiki	City	39,079	42,810	46,895	49,689	51,284	51,652
31	Tōkai	Village	37,900	37,713	37,438	35,450	34,333	32,727
32	Namegata	City	32,215	34,909	37,611	40,035	41,465	42,390
33	Ibaraki	Town	31,417	32,921	34,513	35,008	35,296	35,741
34	Takahagi	City	27,722	29,638	31,017	32,932	34,602	35,604
35	Itako	City	27,624	29,111	30,534	31,524	31,944	32,133
36	Sakai	Town	24,208	24,517	25,714	26,468	27,171	27,237
37	Yachiyo	Town	21,034	22,021	23,106	23,609	24,352	25,008
38	Shirosato	Town	18,109	19,800	21,491	22,993	23,007	21,979
39	Daigo	Town	15,744	18,053	20,073	22,103	23,982	25,604
40	Ōarai	Town	15,725	16,886	18,328	19,205	19,957	20,446
41	Tone	Town	15,352	16,313	17,473	18,024	19,033	20,202
42	Miho	Village	14,611	15,842	17,299	18,118	18,219	17,767

The table list contains 42 of the 44 municipalities of Ibaraki, except Kawachi and Goka.
