= Ishige =

Ishige may refer to:

- Ishige (alga), a genus of brown algae
- Ishige (surname), a Japanese surname
- Ishige, Ibaraki, a former town in Yūki District, Ibaraki Prefecture, Japan
- Ishige Station, a railway station in Jōsō, Ibaraki Prefecture, Japan
