= Shitte Freight Terminal =

Coordinates: 35°52′58.5″N 140°42′0.6″E

Shitte Freight Terminal (知手駅, Shitte-eki) is a railway freight terminal in Kamisu, Ibaraki Prefecture, Japan, operated by the Kashima Rinkai Railway.

== Lines ==
The terminal is located on the Kashima Rinkō freight line from Kashima Soccer Stadium to Okunoyahama Freight Terminal, a distance of 16.4 km from Kashima Soccer Stadium.

== History ==
The terminal opened on 12 November 1970.
