= Kamisu Freight Terminal =

Coordinates: 35°54′39.5″N 140°39′25.7″E

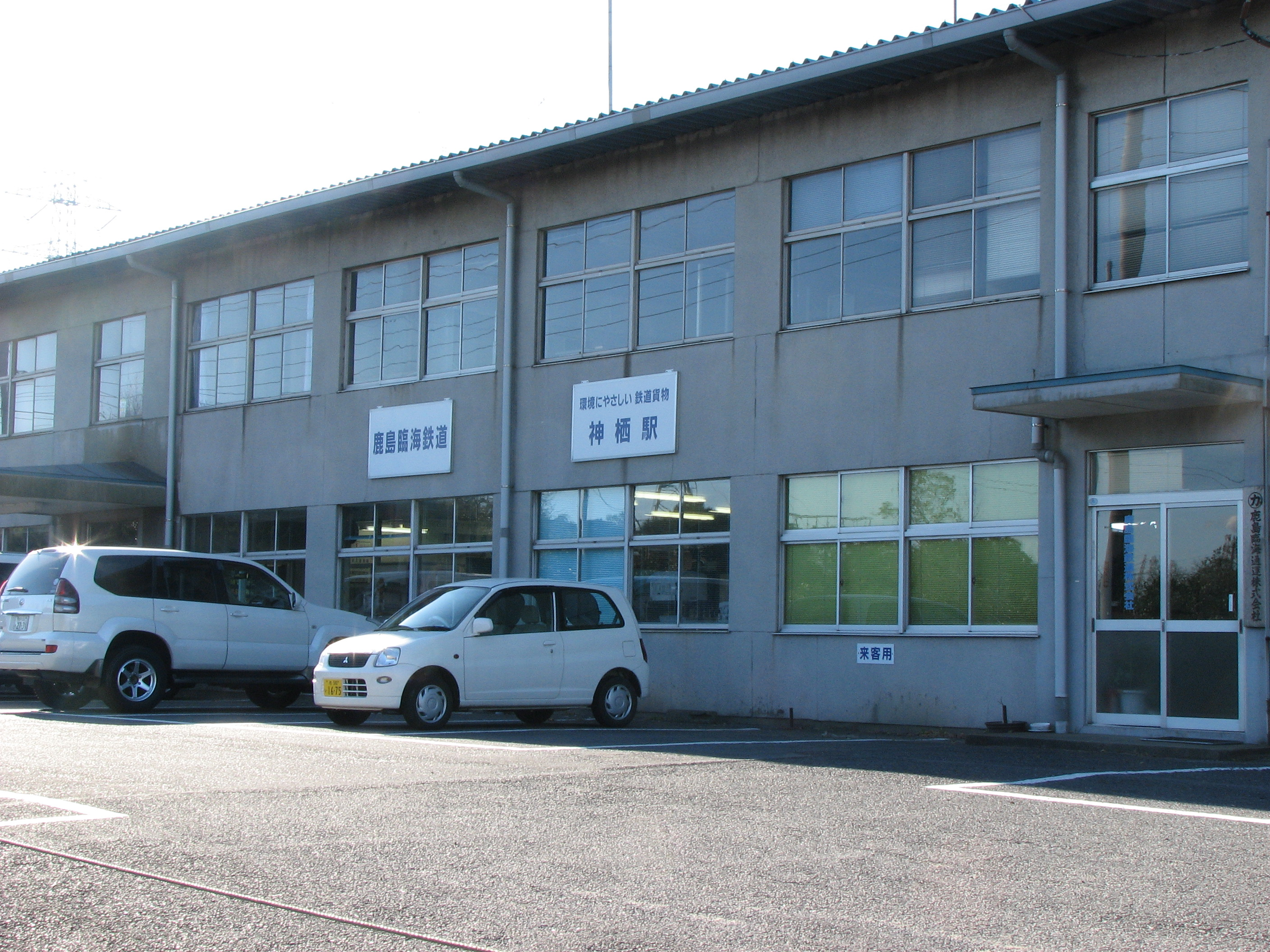
Kamisu Freight Terminal office building, January 2009

Kamisu Freight Terminal (神栖駅, Kamisu-eki) is a railway freight terminal in Kamisu, Ibaraki Prefecture, Japan, operated by the Kashima Rinkai Railway.

== Lines ==
The terminal is located on the Kashima Rinkō freight line from Kashima Soccer Stadium to Okunoyahama Freight Terminal, a distance of 10.1 km (6 mi) from Kashima Soccer Stadium. It is located next to the rolling stock depot for the Kashima Rinkai Railway.

== History ==
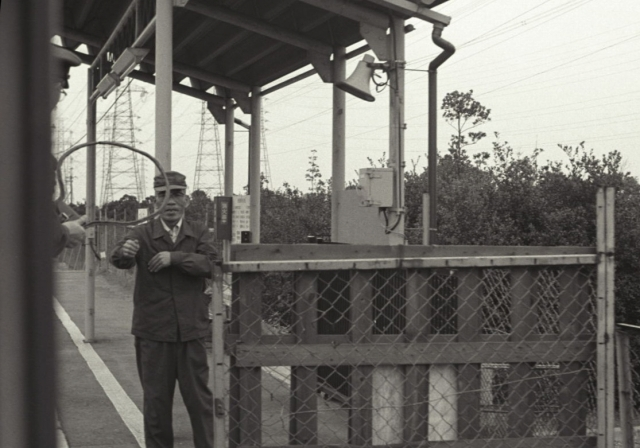
Tablet exchange on the platform used by passenger trains, October 1981

The terminal opened on 12 November 1970. The platform was also used by passenger trains operating between Kita-Kashima Station (now Kashima Soccer Stadium) and Kashimakōnan Station (now closed) between 25 July 1978 and 1 December 1983.
