= Sodo Station =

Sodo Station can refer to:

- Sōdō Station, a station on the Kantō Railway in Shimotsuma, Ibaraki Prefecture, Japan.
- SODO station (Sound Transit), a station on the Central Link in Seattle, Washington, USA.
