= Mitsuma Station =

Railway station in Jōsō, Ibaraki Prefecture, Japan

Mitsuma Station 三妻駅
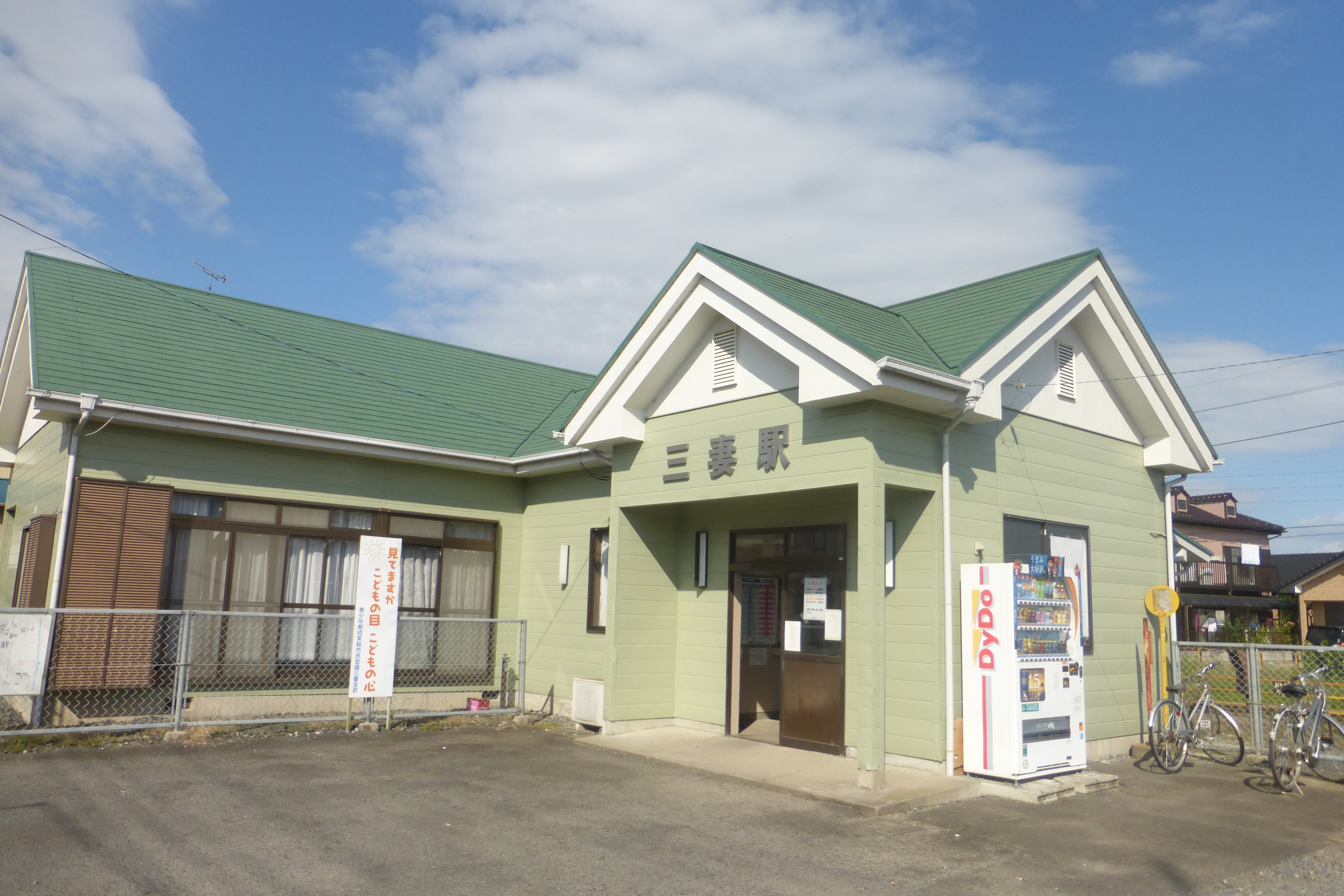
- Mitsuma Station, October 2016

General information
- Location: Misakamachi 1672, Jōsō-shi, Ibaraki-ken 300-2506; Japan
- Coordinates: 36.0735°N 139.9831°E
- Line: ■ Jōsō Line
- Distance: 23.9 km from Toride
- Platforms: 1 island platform

Other information
- Website: Official website

History
- Opened: 1 November 1913; 112 years ago

Passengers
- FY2017: 143

Services
Preceding station	Kantō Railway	Following station
Nakatsuma towards Toride	Jōsō Line Local	Minami-Ishige towards Shimodate
Location
- Location within Ibaraki Prefecture Location within Japan

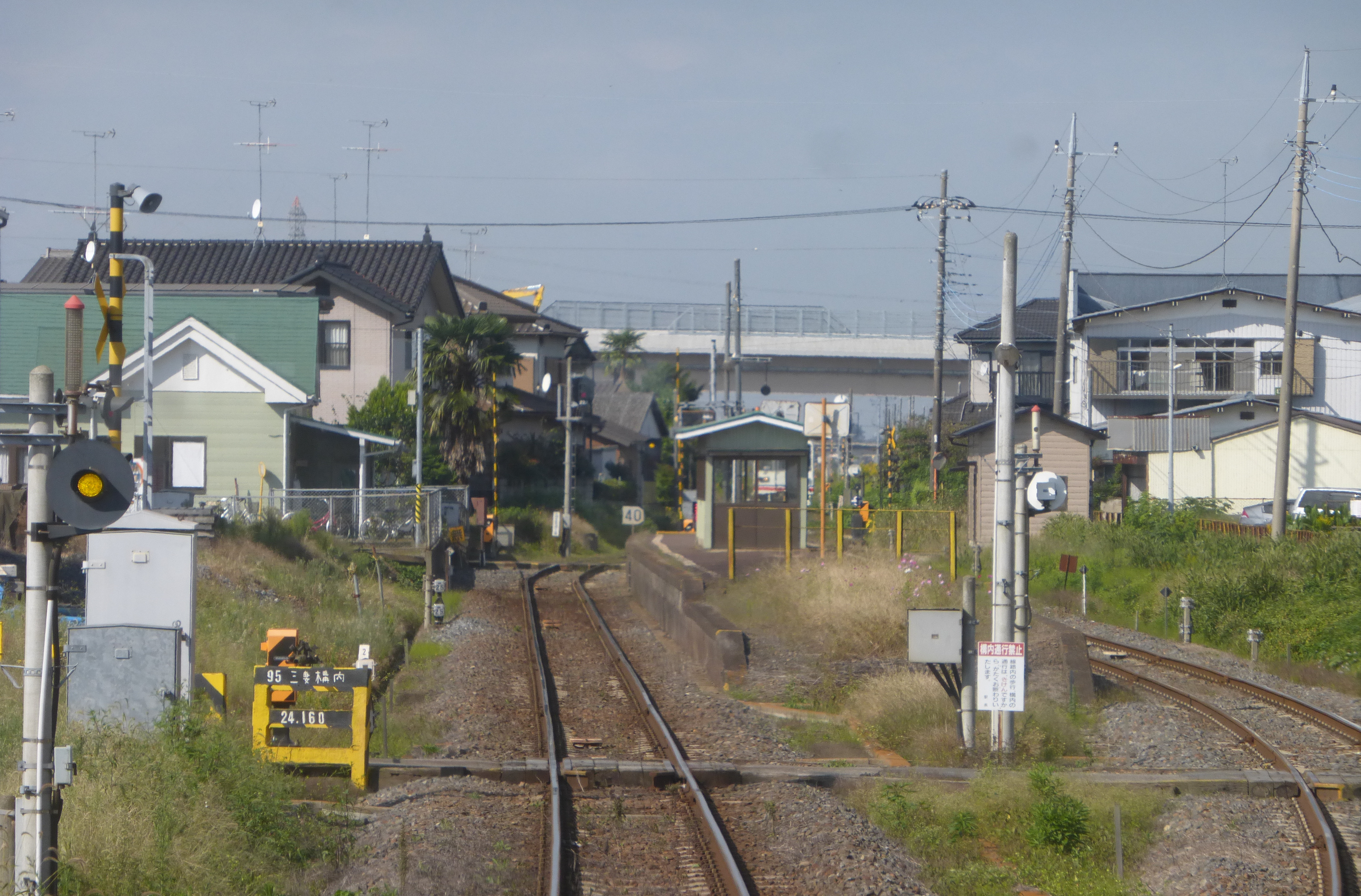
Platforms, 2016

Mitsuma Station (三妻駅, Mitsuma-eki) is a passenger railway station in the city of Jōsō in Ibaraki Prefecture, Japan, operated by the private railway company Kantō Railway.

== Lines ==
The station is on the Jōsō Line and is located 23.9 km (14.9 mi) from the official starting point of the line at Toride Station.

== Station layout ==
The station consists of one island platform, connected to the station building by a level crossing. The station building also doubles as the private residence of the station master.

=== Platforms ===
1	■ Jōsō Line	for Moriya and Toride
2	■ Jōsō Line	for Shimodate

== History ==
Mitsuma Station was opened on 1 November 1913 as a station on the Jōsō Railroad, which became the Kantō Railway in 1965.

== Surrounding area ==
- Kanamura Wake Ikazuchi Shrine
- Misaka Post Office

== See also ==
- List of railway stations in Japan
