= Takashi Nagatsuka =

Japanese poet and novelist (1879–1915)

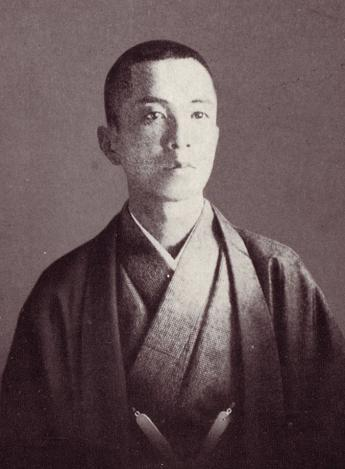
Takashi Nagatsuka

Takashi Nagatsuka (長塚 節, Nagatsuka Takashi; April 3, 1879–February 8, 1915) was a Japanese poet and novelist. According to prominent historian Ann Waswo, Nagatsuka Takashi was born into a landowning family.

Nagatsuka was born in Ibaraki Prefecture, Japan in Kosshō Village (国生村), itself in Ishige Town (石下町), which forms modern day Joso City (常総市).

In 1896, poor health forced him to stop his middle-school education in Mito. In accordance with his duties as eldest son, he assisted his mother Taka in managing their six acres of arable land. He started experimenting in 1905 with different fertilizers, crop-rotation, charcoal-production, and commercial-grade bamboo-production. These are just some of his attempts to save the family's finances from the political career of his father Genjiro (who was elected during the late 1880s to the prefectural assembly), since he tended to absorb other people's debts.

In Tokyo, he studied poetry with Masaoka Shiki from 1900 until 1902, when Shiki died of tuberculosis.

His only novel The Soil ("土;" "Tsuchi") was published in 151-installment series from June–November of 1910 in the Tokyo Asahi Shimbun (東京朝日新聞), which eventually became today's Asahi Shimbun. Two years after its newspaper serialization, The Soil was published as a complete work in book form in 1912. The novel depicts life in rural Japan and in Kosshō Village. The characters are based on actual people, although their names are altered. The novel's copyright expired in the mid-1960s.

He died of laryngeal tuberculosis on February 8, 1915.

== Major works ==
- Shirakuchi no hana (しらくちの花 )
- Sumiyaki no musume (炭焼のむすめ)
- Tajuu to sono inu (太十と其犬)
- Nagatsuka Takashi Kashu (長塚節歌集), tanka collection
- Rinshitsu no kyaku (隣室の客)
- Tsuchi (土)
- The Soil, translated by Ann Waswo, University of California Press, 1989, ISBN 9780520083721

== See also ==
- Japanese literature
- List of Japanese authors
