= Minami-Ishige Station =

Railway station in Jōsō, Ibaraki Prefecture, Japan

Minami-Ishige Station 南石下駅
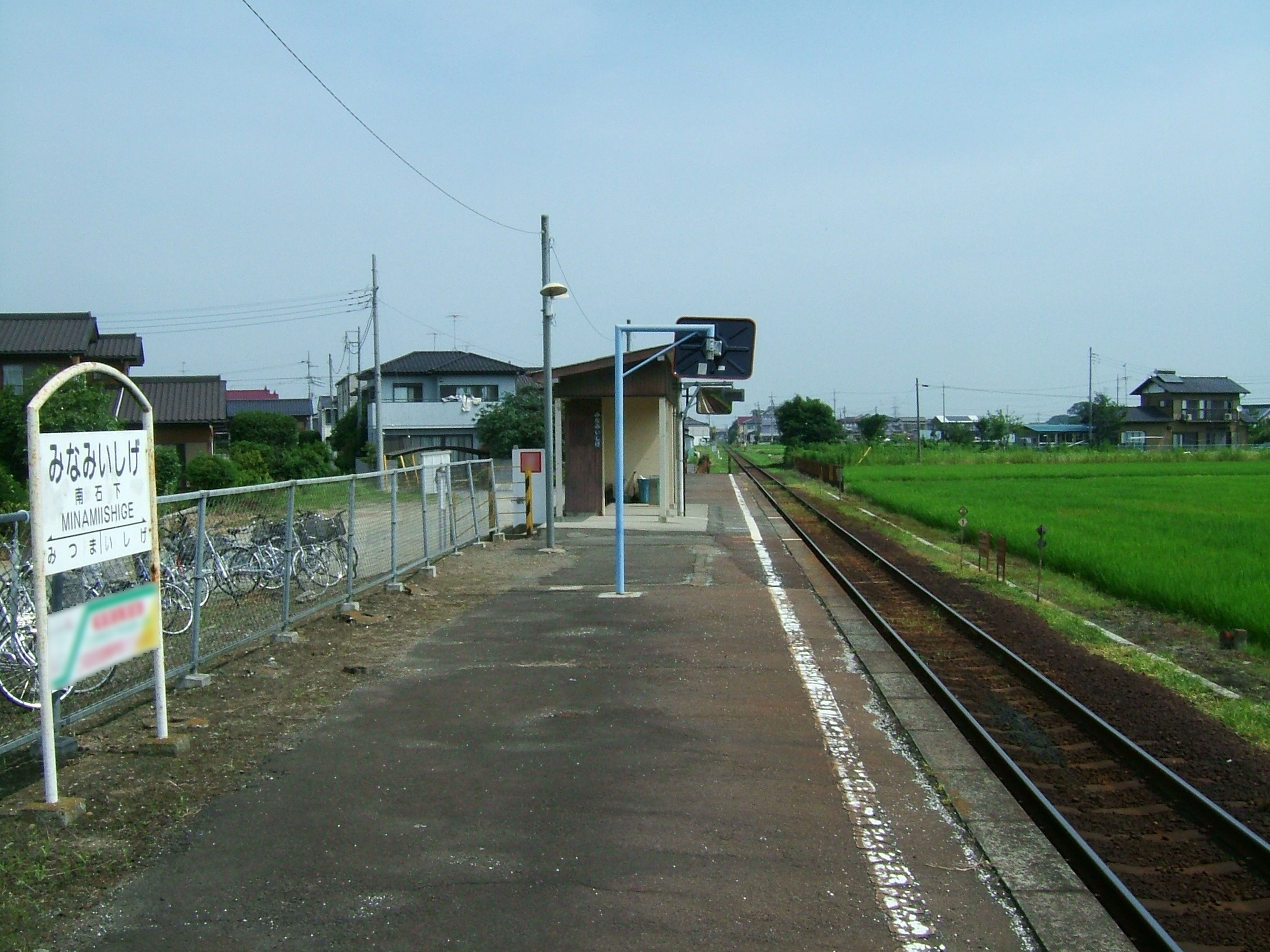
- Minami-Ishige Station, July 2008

General information
- Location: Daibo 742-4, Jōsō-shi, Ibaraki-ken 300-2716; Japan
- Coordinates: 36.1024°N 139.9737°E
- Line: ■ Jōsō Line
- Distance: 27.2 km from Toride
- Platforms: 1 side platform

Other information
- Website: Official website

History
- Opened: 5 November 1913; 112 years ago

Passengers
- FY2017: 266

Services
Preceding station	Kantō Railway	Following station
Mitsuma towards Toride	Jōsō Line Local	Ishige towards Shimodate
Location
- Location within Ibaraki Prefecture Location within Japan

Minami-Ishige Station (南石下駅, Minami-Ishige-eki) is a passenger railway station in the city of Jōsō, Ibaraki Prefecture, Japan operated by the private railway company Kantō Railway.

== Lines ==
Minami-Ishige Station is a station on the Jōsō Line, and is located 27.2 km (16.9 mi) from the official starting point of the line at Toride Station.

== Station layout ==
The station consists of a single side platform serving traffic in both directions. There is no station building, but only a shelter built onto the platform. The station is unattended.

== History ==
Minami-Ishige Station was opened on 5 November 1931 as a station on the Jōsō Railroad, which became the Kantō Railway in 1965.

== Passenger statistics ==
In fiscal 2017, the station was used by an average of 266 passengers daily).

== Surrounding area ==
The station is located in a semi-rural area with few buildings nearby.

== See also ==
- List of railway stations in Japan
