= Naoya Ishigami =

Japanese footballer

Naoya Ishigami 石神 直哉
Personal information
- Date of birth: 2 March 1985 (age 41)
- Place of birth: Kamisu, Ibaraki, Japan
- Height: 1.81 m (5 ft 11 in)
- Position: Defender

Team information
- Current team: FC Tiamo Hirakata
- Number: 19

Youth career
- 2003–2006: Kanagawa University

Senior career*
Years	Team	Apps	(Gls)
2007–2008	Kashima Antlers	14	(0)
2009–2010	Cerezo Osaka	64	(6)
2011	Shonan Bellmare	25	(0)
2012	→ Oita Trinita (loan)	39	(1)
2013	→ Tokyo Verdy (loan)	32	(1)
2014–2015	V-Varen Nagasaki	31	(2)
2016–2017	Giravanz Kitakyushu	30	(2)
2018–2019	FC Maruyasu Okazaki	3	(0)
2020–	FC Tiamo Hirakata		
Medal record
Kashima Antlers
Winner	J1 League	2007
Winner	J1 League	2008
Winner	Emperor's Cup	2007
- * Club domestic league appearances and goals as of 23 February 2020

Naoya Ishigami (石神 直哉, Ishigami Naoya; born 2 March 1985 in Kamisu, Ibaraki) is a Japanese footballer who is currently playing for FC Tiamo Hirakata.

== Career statistics ==
Updated to 23 February 2020.

Club	Season	League		Emperor's Cup		J. League Cup		AFC		Other^{1}		Total	
Club	Season	Apps	Goals	Apps	Goals	Apps	Goals	Apps	Goals	Apps	Goals	Apps	Goals
Kashima Antlers	2007	10	0	0	0	3	0	–		–		13	0
Kashima Antlers	2008	4	0	0	0	0	0	1	0	–		5	0
Cerezo Osaka	2009	50	5	0	0	–		–		–		50	5
Cerezo Osaka	2010	14	1	2	0	4	0	–		–		20	1
Shonan Bellmare	2011	25	0	2	0	–		–		–		27	0
Oita Trinita	2012	39	1	0	0	0	0	–		1	0	40	1
Tokyo Verdy	2013	32	1	1	0	–		–		–		33	1
V-Varen Nagasaki	2014	20	2	0	0	–		–		–		20	2
V-Varen Nagasaki	2015	11	0	1	0	–		–		–		12	0
Giravanz Kitakyushu	2016	23	2	0	0	–		–		–		23	2
Giravanz Kitakyushu	2017	7	0	2	0	–		–		–		9	0
FC Maruyasu Okazaki	2018	2	0	–		–		–		–		2	0
FC Maruyasu Okazaki	2019	1	0	–		–		–		–		1	0
Career total		238	12	8	0	7	0	1	0	1	0	254	12

^{1}Includes Promotion Playoffs to J1.

== Team honors ==
=== Kashima Antlers ===
- J1 League (2): 2007, 2008
