= Nakatsuma Station =

Railway station in Jōsō, Ibaraki Prefecture, Japan

Nakatsuma Station 中妻駅
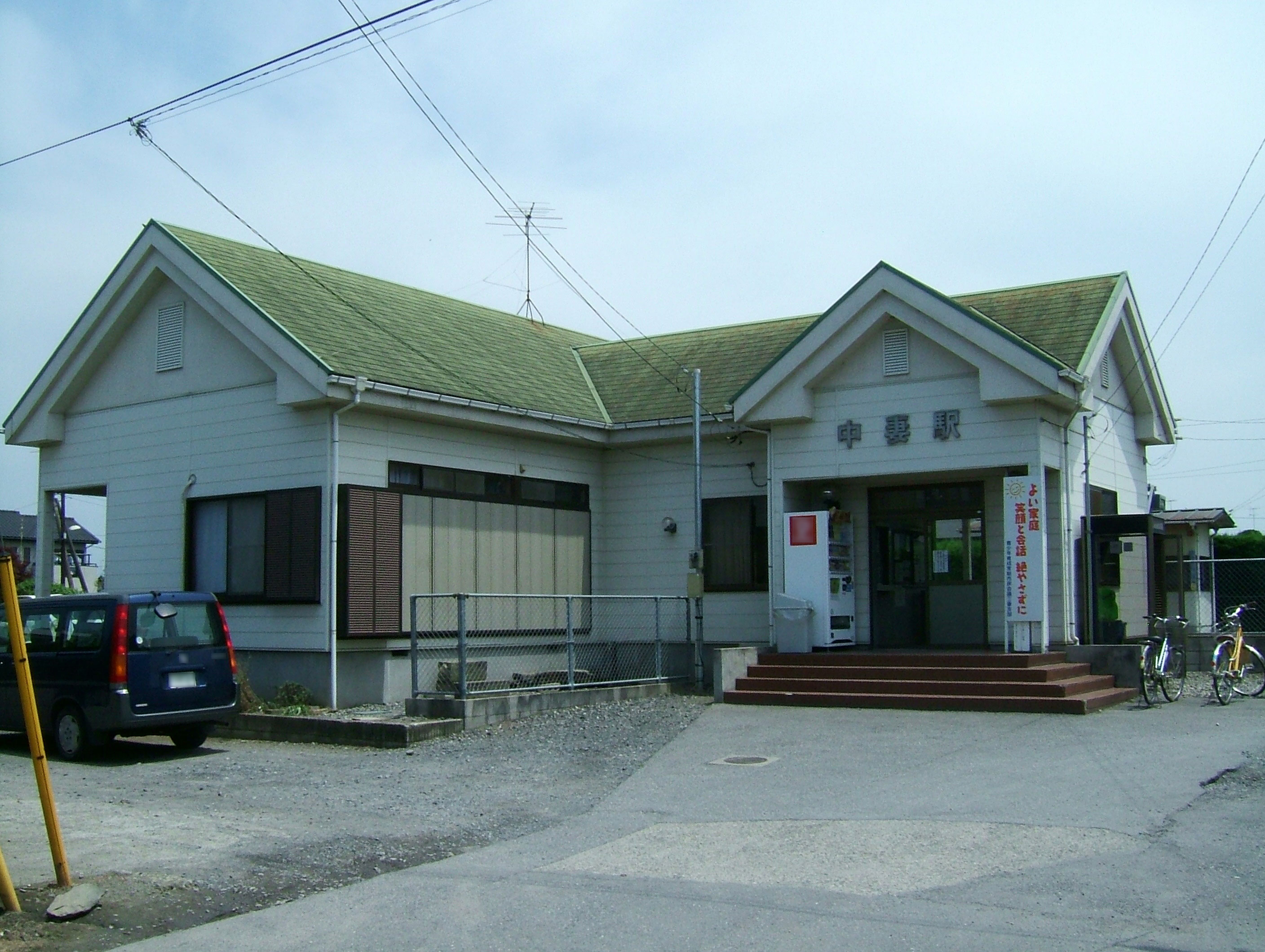
- Nakatsuma Station, July 2008

General information
- Location: Nakatsuma-machi 714-4, Jōsō-shi, Ibaraki-ken 300-2505; Japan
- Coordinates: 36.0473°N 139.9905°E
- Operator: Kantō Railway
- Line: ■ Jōsō Line
- Distance: 20.9 km from Toride
- Platforms: 2 side platforms

Other information
- Website: Official website

History
- Opened: 1 November 1913; 112 years ago

Passengers
- FY2017: 133

Services
Preceding station	Kantō Railway	Following station
Kita-Mitsukaidō towards Toride	Jōsō Line Local	Mitsuma towards Shimodate
Location
- Location within Ibaraki Prefecture Location within Japan

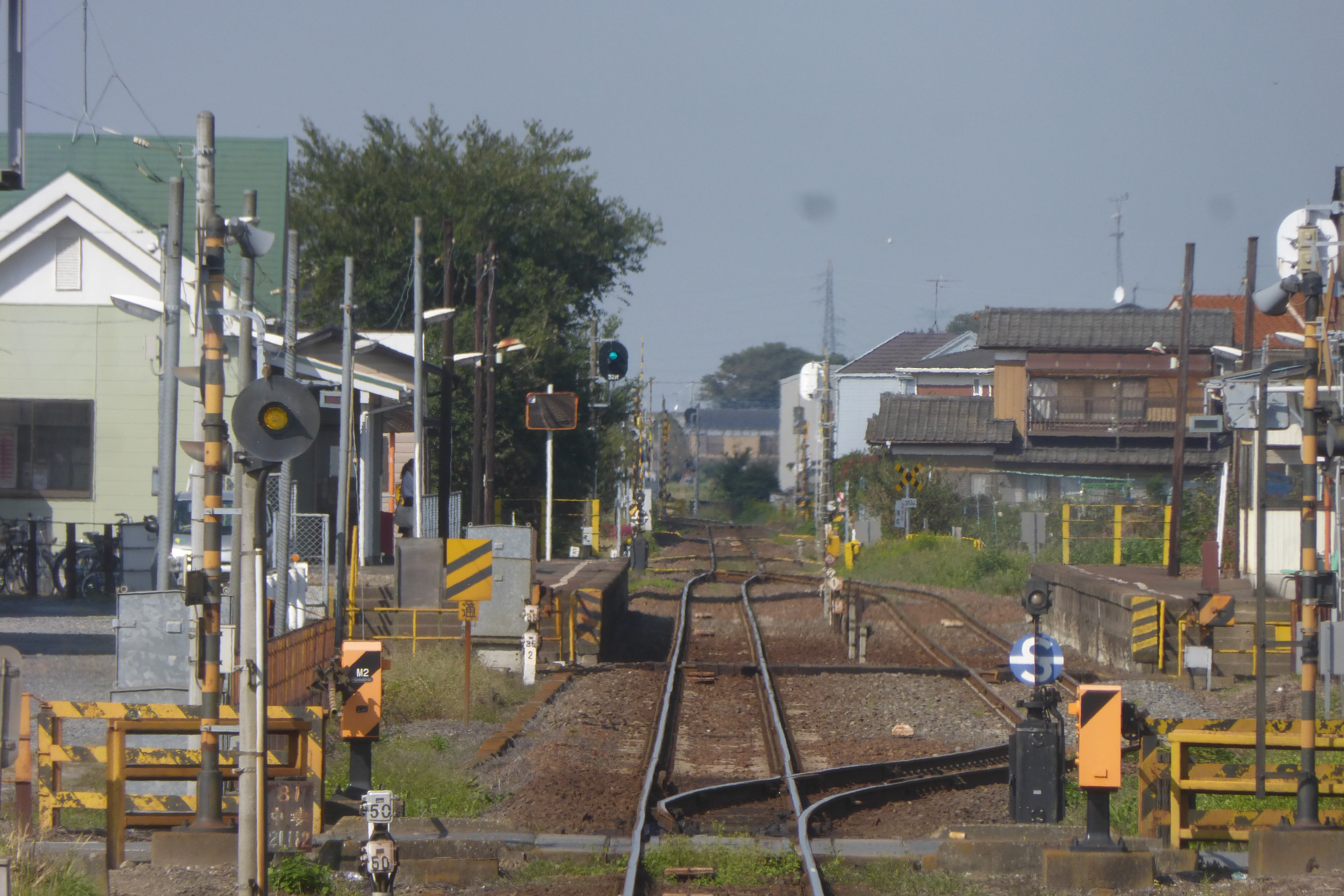
Platforms, 2016

Nakatsuma Station (中妻駅, Nakatsuma-eki) is a passenger railway station in the city of Jōsō, Ibaraki Prefecture, Japan operated by the private railway company Kantō Railway.

== Lines ==
Nakatsuma Station is a station on the Jōsō Line, and is located 20.9 km (13.0 mi) from the official starting point of the line at Toride Station.

== Station layout ==
The station consists of two opposed side platforms, connected to the station building by a level crossing. The station building also doubles as the private residence of the station master.

=== Platforms ===
1	■ Jōsō Line	for Shimodate
2	■ Jōsō Line	for Moriya and Toride

== History ==
Nakatsuma Station was opened on 1 November 1913 as a station on the Jōsō Railroad, which became the Kantō Railway in 1965.

== Passenger statistics ==
In fiscal 2017, the station was used by an average of 133 passengers daily).

== Surrounding area ==
- Chiyoda Danchi public housing

== See also ==
- List of railway stations in Japan
