= Kashima Rinkai Railway Kashima Rinkō Line =

Freight railway line in Ibaraki prefecture, Japan

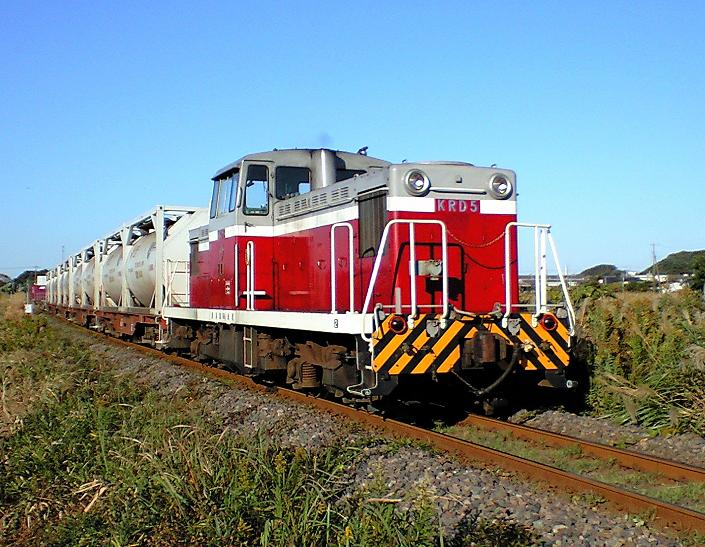
Kashima Rinkai Railway Class KRD diesel locomotive KRD 5

The Kashima Rinkō Line (鹿島臨港線, Kashima Rinkō-sen) is a 19.2-kilometre-long (11.9 mi) Japanese freight railway line which connects Kashima Soccer Stadium with Okunoyahama Freight Terminal in Ibaraki Prefecture. It is owned and run by the Kashima Rinkai Railway. The line opened on 12 July 1970.

== Stations ==
Name		Between (km)	Distance (km)	Connections	Location
Kashima Soccer Stadium	鹿島サッカースタジアム	-	0.0	Kashima Rinkai Railway: Ōarai Kashima Line; JR East: Kashima Line	Kashima
Igiri	居切	-	-	Closed 1978	Kamisu
Kamisu Freight Terminal	神栖	10.1	10.1		Kamisu
Kōnoike	神之池	-	-	Closed 1976	Kamisu
Kashimakōnan	鹿島港南	-	-	Closed 1983	Kamisu
Shitte Freight Terminal	知手	6.3	16.4		Kamisu
Okunoyahama Freight Terminal	奥野谷浜	2.8	19.2		Kamisu
