= Chiyokawa, Ibaraki =

Former village in Ibaraki Prefecture, Japan

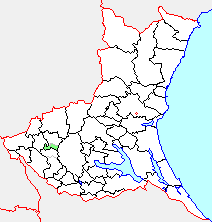
Map of Chiyokawa, Ibaraki

Chiyokawa (千代川村, Chiyokawa-mura) was a village located in Yūki District, Ibaraki Prefecture, Japan.

On January 1, 2006, Chiyokawa was merged into the expanded city of Shimotsuma.

As of 2003, the village had an estimated population of 9,589 and a density of 483.56 people per km^{2}. The total area was 19.83 km^{2}.
