= Yūki District =

Japanese district in Ibaraki Prefecture

Coordinates: 36°11′05″N 139°53′42″E

Location of Yūki District in Ibaraki Prefecture

Yūki (結城郡, Yūki-gun) is a district located in Ibaraki Prefecture, Japan. As at May, 2008, the district had an estimated Population of 23,388 and a Density of 396 persons/km^{2}. The total area is 59.1 km^{2}.

The district contains one town, Yachiyo (八千代町, Yachiyo-machi)

== Administrative changes ==
On April 1, 1889, due to the municipal status enforcement, the town of Yūki and the villages of Kinugawa, Egawa, Kamiyamakawa, Yamakawa, Nasaki, Nakayūki, and Shimoyūki were formed within Yūki District. On April 1, 1896, Yūki, Okada, and Toyoda Districts merged to form the new Yūki District. The village of Ishige gained town status on August 24, 1897, becoming the town of Ishige, the third town in the district.

On March 14, 1954 the village of Yamakawa merged into the town of Yūki, and the following day the town of Yūki absorbed the villages of Kinugawa, Egawa, and Kamiyamakawa and gained city status to become the city of Yūki. On June 1 of the same year, the villages of Fusakami and Toyokami merged into the town of Shimotsuma, Makabe District. The town of Shimotsuma gained town status to become the city of Shimotsuma on the same day. One month later, on July 10, the town of Mitsukaido absorbed the villages of Toyooka, Sugawara, Ōhanawa, Mitsuma, Goka, Ōnoo, and 坂手, Kitasōma District, and gained city status to become the city of Mitsukaido. On October 1, 1954, parts of the village of Tama merged into the village of Sōdō, and the town of Ishige and the villages of Toyoda, Okada, Iinuma, and the remaining parts of Tama merged to form the town of Ishige.

On January 1, 1955, the villages of Sōdō, Kokai, and Ōgata merged to form the village of Chiyokawa, and the villages of Nishitoyoda, Nakayūki, Anjō, and Shimoyūki merged with the village of Kawanishi, Makabe District to form the village of Yachiyo. On February 11 that year, the village of Nasaki merged with the villages of Kōjima and Yamata, Sashima District to form the Sanwa, Sashima District.

On February 1, 1972, the village of Yachiyo gained town status to become the town of Yachiyo.

On January 1, 2006, the village of Chiyokawa merged into the city of Shimotsuma, and the town of Ishige merged into the city of Mitsukaido. The city of Mitsukaido was renamed to become the city of Jōsō on the same day.
