= Tamamura Station =

Railway station in Jōsō, Ibaraki Prefecture, Japan

Tamamura Station 玉村駅
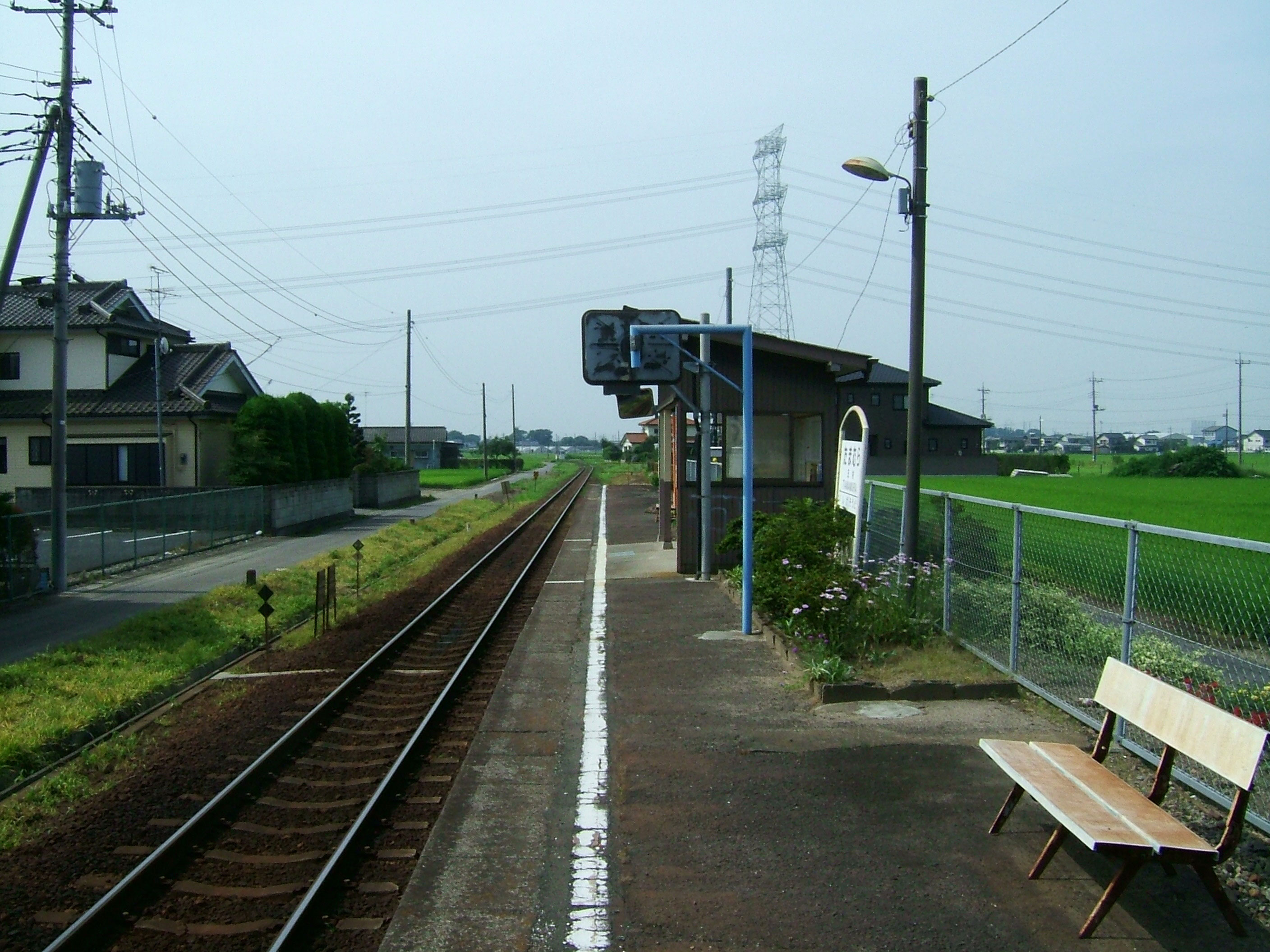
- Tamamura Station, July 2008

General information
- Location: Obokawa 164-5, Jōsō-shi, Ibaraki-ken 300-2702; Japan
- Coordinates: 36.1353°N 139.9702°E
- Operator: Kantō Railway
- Line: ■ Jōsō Line
- Distance: 31.0 km from Toride
- Platforms: 1 side platform

Other information
- Status: Unstaffed
- Website: Official website

History
- Opened: 5 November 1913; 112 years ago

Passengers
- FY2017: 87

Services
Preceding station	Kantō Railway	Following station
Ishige towards Toride	Jōsō Line Local	Sōdō towards Shimodate
Location
- Location within Ibaraki Prefecture Location within Japan

Tamamura Station (玉村駅, Tamamura-eki) is a passenger railway station in the city of Jōsō, Ibaraki Prefecture, Japan operated by the private railway company Kantō Railway.

== Lines ==
Tamamura Station is a station on the Jōsō Line, and is located 31.0 km (19.3 mi) from the official starting point of the line at Toride Station.

== Station layout ==
The station consists of a single side platform serving traffic in both directions. There is no station building but only a waiting room on the platform. The station is unattended.

== History ==
Tamamura Station was opened on 5 November 1931 as a station on the Jōsō Railroad, which became the Kantō Railway in 1965. The station building was rebuilt in July 1967.

== Passenger statistics ==
In fiscal 2017, the station was used by an average of 87 passengers daily).

== Surrounding area ==
The station is located in a rural area surrounded by fields, with few houses or other buildings in the vicinity.

== See also ==
- List of railway stations in Japan
