= Ishige (surname) =

Ishige (written: 石毛) is a Japanese surname. Notable people with the surname include:

- Hideki Ishige (石毛 秀樹, born 1994), Japanese footballer
- Hiromichi Ishige (石毛 宏典, born 1956), Japanese baseball player
- Sawa Ishige (石毛 佐和, born 1979), Japanese voice actress
- Shōya Ishige (石毛翔弥, born 1990), Japanese voice actor
- Toshiyasu Ishige (石下 年安, born 1932), Japanese sport shooter
