= Atsushi Koyano =

Japanese scholar

Atsushi Koyano (小谷野 敦, Koyano Atsushi; 21 December 1962) is a Japanese scholar of comparative literature and critic. He also has advanced degrees and pedagogy careers in Osaka University, Meiji University, Tokyo University.

== Early life and education ==
Born in Mitsukaido, Ibaraki on 21 December 1962, Koyano moved to Koshigaya, Saitama, a suburb of Tokyo when he was a third grader. He spent three years at Kaijo High School at Shinjuku-ku, Tokyo, which had been founded in 1891 as a prep school for Japan's Naval Academy, before entering the prestigious University of Tokyo (Todai). After graduating from Todai, Faculty of Letters (majoring in English literature), his academic career further progressed. He lectured full-time at Osaka University from April 1994 to March 1999. During that time, he gained a PhD from Todai in 1997 for his work on the male psychology of love in Japanese literature in historical contexts.

== Thought ==
Koyano specializes in "Falling in loves and Marriages in the modern Japanese society".

== Literature and researches ==
- "Motenai Otoko - ren ai ron wo koe te"

(The title : Always alone - beyond the "Falling in love")

- "Edo Genso Hihan"

(The Contents : On the research for Edo period, he is provoking and sometimes prohibiting the exceeded and inappropriate historical imaging without suitable references)

- "Tennosei Hihan no Joshiki"

(The Common Sense of Criticism on the Monarchy)
