= Okunoyahama Freight Terminal =

Coordinates: 35°54′5.8″N 140°42′2.0″E

Okunoyahama Freight Terminal (奥野谷浜駅, Okunoyahama-eki) is a railway freight terminal in Kamisu, Ibaraki Prefecture, Japan, operated by the Kashima Rinkai Railway.

== Lines ==
The terminal is located at the end of the 19.2 km Kashima Rinkō freight line from Kashima Soccer Stadium.

== History ==
The terminal opened on 12 November 1970.
