= Shimotsuma =

Shimotsuma 下妻市
- City
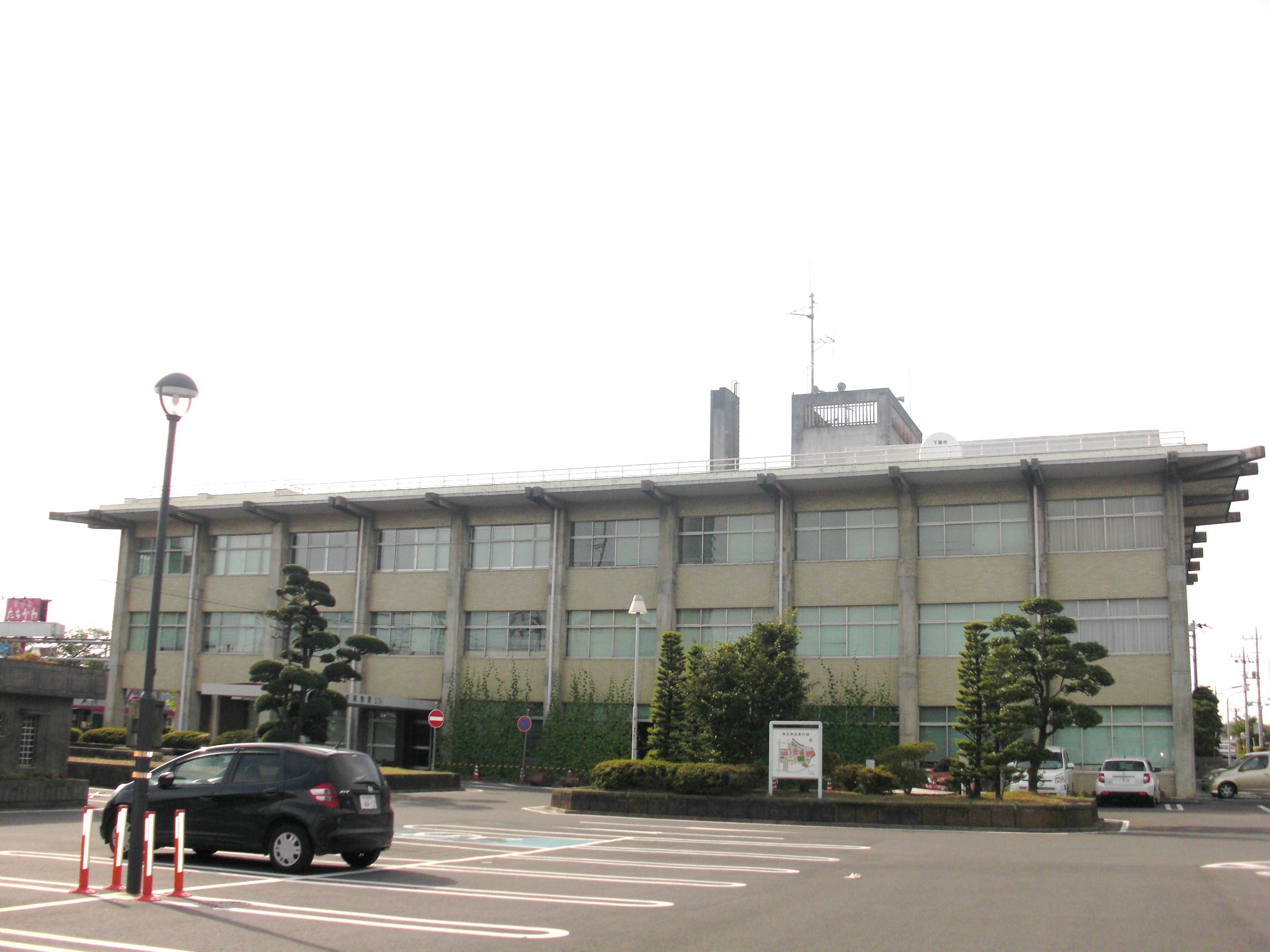
- Shimotsuma city hall

- Flag Seal

- Location of Shimotsuma in Ibaraki Prefecture

- Coordinates: 36°11′3.9″N 139°58′2.9″E
- Country: Japan
- Region: Kantō
- Prefecture: Ibaraki
- Town settled: April 1. 1889
- City Settled: June 1, 1954

Government
  - Mayor: Vacant

Area
  - Total: 80.88 km^{2} (31.23 sq mi)

Population (January 2024)
  - Total: 41,621
  - Density: 514.6/km^{2} (1,333/sq mi)
- Time zone: UTC+9 (Japan Standard Time)
- Phone number: 0296-43-2111
- Address: 2-22 Honjo-cho, Shimotsuma-shi, Ibaraki-ken 304-8501
- Climate: Cfa
- Website: Official website
- Symbols
- Flower: Chrysanthemum
- Tree: Pine

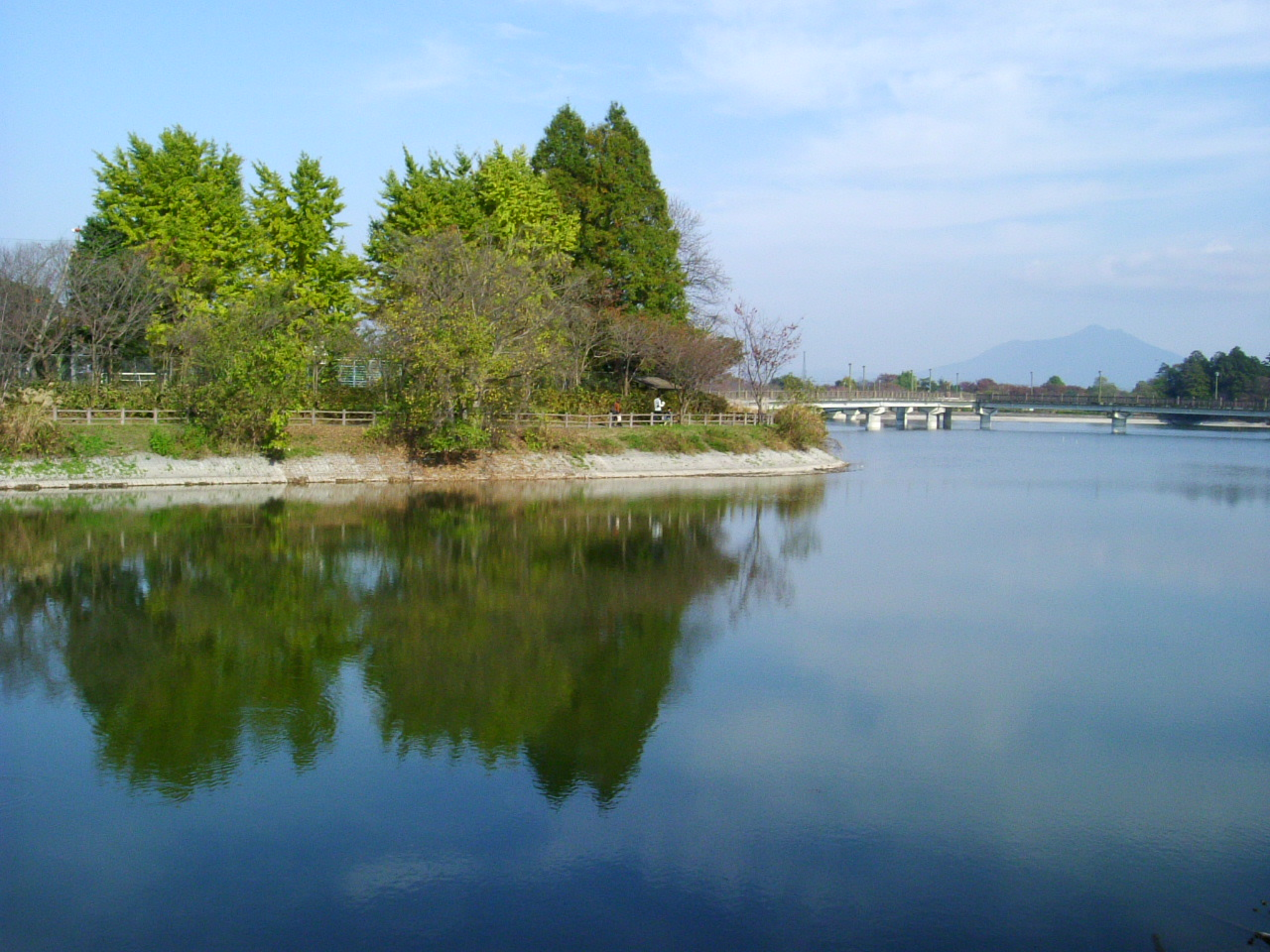
Lake Sanuma

Shimotsuma (下妻市, Shimotsuma-shi) is a city located in Ibaraki Prefecture, Japan. As of 1 January 2024, the city had an estimated population of 41,621 in 17,294 households and a population density of 515 persons per km². The percentage of the population aged over 65 was 29.0%. The total area of the city is 80.88 square kilometres (31.23 sq mi).

== Geography ==
Shimotsuma is located in western Ibaraki Prefecture. The Kinugawa River flows through the city.

=== Surrounding municipalities ===
Ibaraki Prefecture

- Chikusei
- Jōsō
- Tsukuba
- Yachiyo

=== Climate ===
Shimotsuma has a Humid continental climate (Köppen Cfa) characterized by warm summers and cool winters with light snowfall. The average annual temperature in Shimotsuma is 14.3 °C (57.7 °F). The average annual rainfall is 1,231.8 mm (48.50 in) with October as the wettest month. The temperatures are highest on average in August, at around 25.8 °C (78.4 °F), and lowest in January, at around 3.0 °C (37.4 °F).

Climate data for Shimotsuma (1991−2020 normals, extremes 1978−present)
Month	Jan	Feb	Mar	Apr	May	Jun	Jul	Aug	Sep	Oct	Nov	Dec	Year
Record high °C (°F)	17.7 (63.9)	23.8 (74.8)	26.1 (79.0)	29.7 (85.5)	33.3 (91.9)	34.5 (94.1)	37.0 (98.6)	37.7 (99.9)	36.8 (98.2)	32.5 (90.5)	25.5 (77.9)	24.7 (76.5)	37.7 (99.9)
Mean daily maximum °C (°F)	9.0 (48.2)	9.9 (49.8)	13.4 (56.1)	18.8 (65.8)	22.9 (73.2)	25.5 (77.9)	29.2 (84.6)	30.7 (87.3)	27.3 (81.1)	21.7 (71.1)	16.2 (61.2)	11.2 (52.2)	19.6 (67.4)
Daily mean °C (°F)	3.0 (37.4)	4.1 (39.4)	7.6 (45.7)	12.9 (55.2)	17.8 (64.0)	21.1 (70.0)	24.7 (76.5)	25.8 (78.4)	22.4 (72.3)	16.7 (62.1)	10.5 (50.9)	5.2 (41.4)	14.3 (57.8)
Mean daily minimum °C (°F)	−2.4 (27.7)	−1.4 (29.5)	2.0 (35.6)	7.3 (45.1)	13.4 (56.1)	17.5 (63.5)	21.3 (70.3)	22.3 (72.1)	18.7 (65.7)	12.4 (54.3)	5.4 (41.7)	−0.1 (31.8)	9.7 (49.4)
Record low °C (°F)	−13.7 (7.3)	−11.4 (11.5)	−6.4 (20.5)	−3.2 (26.2)	2.7 (36.9)	9.9 (49.8)	13.1 (55.6)	14.9 (58.8)	6.8 (44.2)	1.1 (34.0)	−3.8 (25.2)	−7.7 (18.1)	−13.7 (7.3)
Average precipitation mm (inches)	39.1 (1.54)	39.5 (1.56)	80.2 (3.16)	101.2 (3.98)	122.9 (4.84)	121.2 (4.77)	144.2 (5.68)	123.9 (4.88)	171.9 (6.77)	176.0 (6.93)	70.5 (2.78)	41.2 (1.62)	1,231.8 (48.50)
Average precipitation days (≥ 1.0 mm)	4.0	5.0	9.0	9.9	10.7	11.7	11.9	8.4	10.9	10.3	6.6	5.1	103.5
Mean monthly sunshine hours	199.4	184.7	186.2	181.3	177.8	123.0	141.8	175.0	133.2	137.2	154.2	179.3	1,978
Source: Japan Meteorological Agency

== Demographics ==
Per Japanese census data, the population of Shimotsuma peaked around the year 2000 and has declined slightly since.

Historical population
Year	Pop.	±%
1920	38,559	—
1930	37,829	−1.9%
1940	37,718	−0.3%
1950	42,123	+11.7%
1960	38,458	−8.7%
1970	35,512	−7.7%
1980	39,337	+10.8%
1990	42,704	+8.6%
2000	46,544	+9.0%
2010	44,987	−3.3%
2020	42,521	−5.5%

== History ==
Shimotsuma developed as a castle town from the Muromachi period. It was the center of Shimotsuma Domain under the Tokugawa shogunate during the Edo period. The town of Shimotsuma was established on April 1, 1889 with the establishment of the modern municipalities system. It was elevated to city status on January 1, 1955.

On January 1, 2006, the village of Chiyokawa (from Yūki District) was merged into Shimotsuma.

== Government ==
Shimotsuma has a mayor-council form of government with a directly elected mayor and a unicameral city council of 20 members. Shimotsuma contributes one member to the Ibaraki Prefectural Assembly. In terms of national politics, the city is part of Ibaraki 1st district of the lower house of the Diet of Japan.

== Economy ==
The economy of Shimotsuma is primarily agricultural.

== Education ==
Shimotsuma has nine public elementary schools and three public middle schools operated by the city government, and two public high schools operated by the Ibaraki Prefectural Board of Education. The prefecture also operates a special education school for the handicapped.

A Brazilian school Escola Pingo de Gente was formerly located in Shimotsuma. It has since been renamed to Instituto Educare and moved to Tsukuba.

== Transportation ==
=== Railway ===
Kantō Railway Jōsō Line

- Sōdō - Shimotsuma - Daihō - Tobanoe.

=== Highway ===
- National Route 125
- National Route 294

== Local attractions ==
- Lake Sanuma
- Site of Shimotsuma Castle
- Tsukuba Circuit

== Noted people from Shimotsuma ==
- Yasuhiro Awano, Olympic judoka
- Yusuke Oyama, Professional baseball infielder
- Maki Tsukada, Olympic judoka

== In popular culture ==
The city is the setting of Takemoto Novala's novel Shimotsuma Monogatari (also known as Kamikaze Girls), and the manga and film of that name. The movie was filmed on location in Shimotsuma.
