= Sōdō Station =

Railway station in Shimotsuma, Ibaraki Prefecture, Japan

Sōdō Station 宗道駅
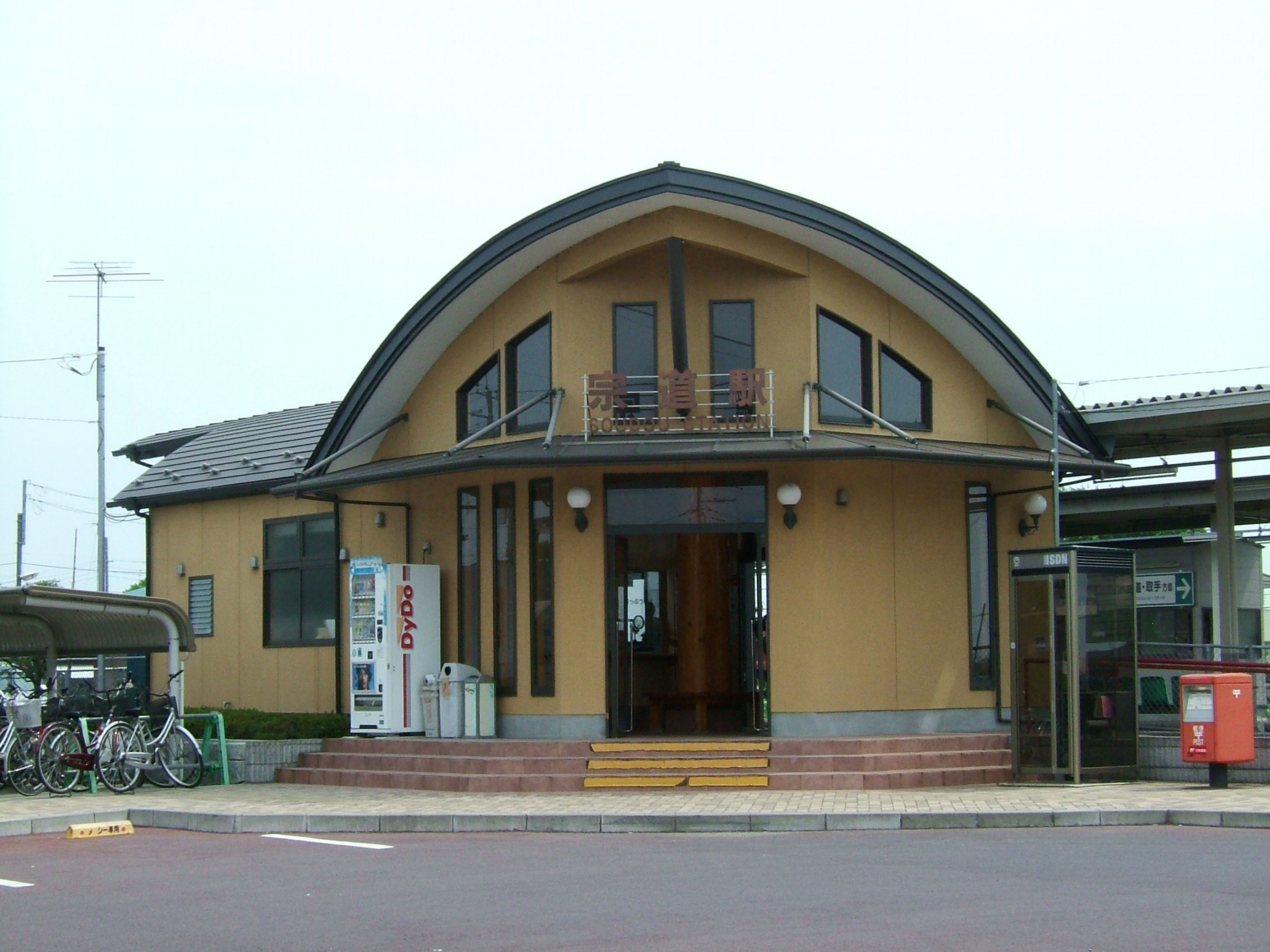
- Sōdō Station, July 2008

General information
- Location: Sōdō 164, Shimotsuma, Ibaraki-ken 304-0814; Japan
- Coordinates: 36.1535°N 139.9708°E
- Operator: Kantō Railway
- Line: ■ Jōsō Line
- Distance: 33.0 km from Toride
- Platforms: 2 side platforms

Other information
- Website: Official website

History
- Opened: 1 November 1913; 112 years ago

Passengers
- FY2017: 254

Services
Preceding station	Kantō Railway	Following station
Tamamura towards Toride	Jōsō Line Local	Shimotsuma towards Shimodate
Location
- Location within Ibaraki Prefecture Location within Japan

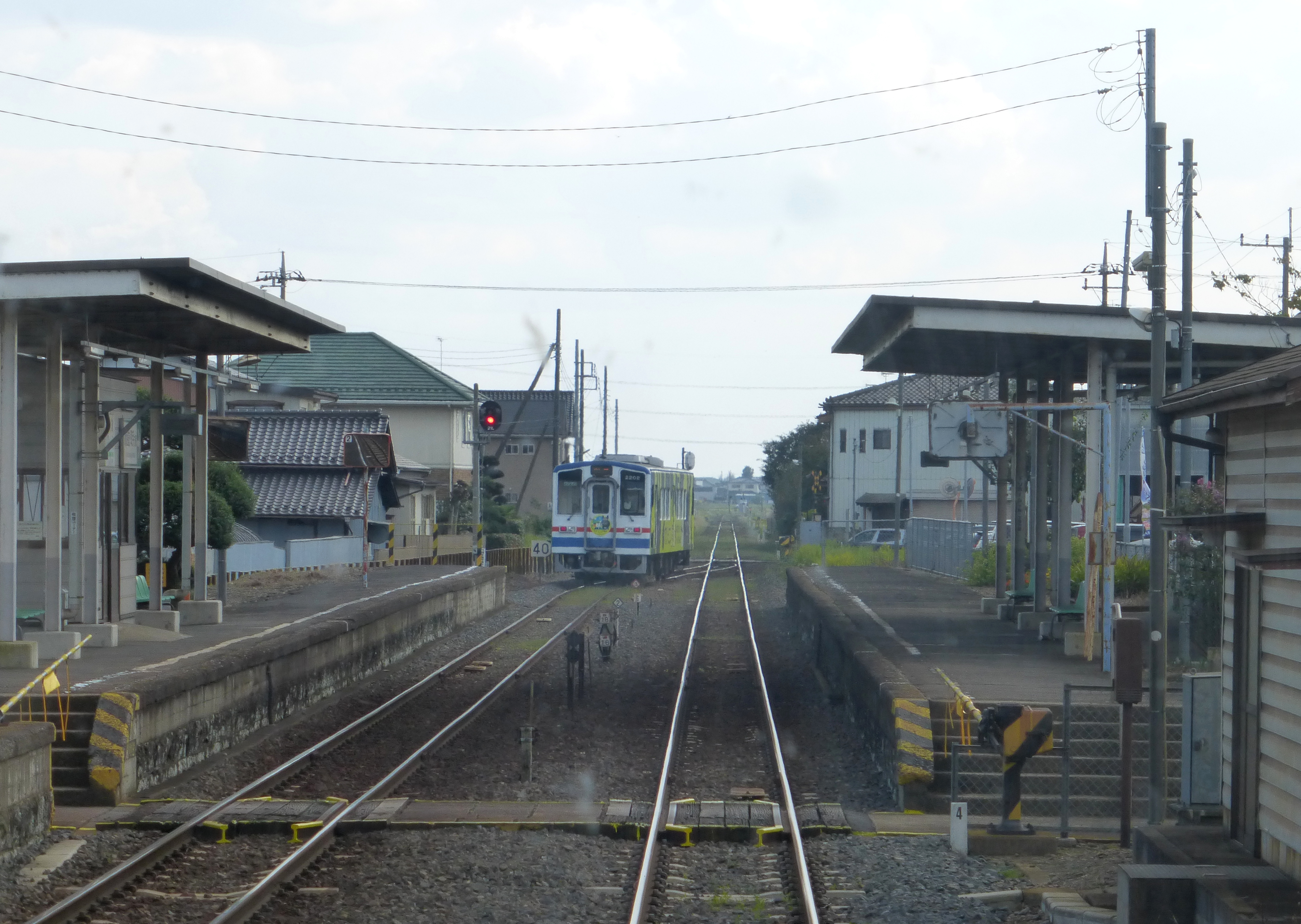
Platforms, 2016

Sōdō Station (宗道駅, Sōdō-eki) is a passenger railway station in the city of Shimotsuma, Ibaraki Prefecture, Japan operated by the private railway company Kantō Railway.

== Lines ==
Sōdō Station is a station on the Jōsō Line, and is located 33.0 km (20.5 mi) from the official starting point of the line at Toride Station.

== Station layout ==
The station consists of two opposed side platforms, connected to the station building by a level crossing.

=== Platforms ===
1	■ Jōsō Line	for Shimodate
2	■ Jōsō Line	for Moriya and Toride

== History ==
Sōdō Station was opened on 1 November 1913 as a station on the Jōsō Railroad, which became the Kantō Railway in 1965. The station building was rebuilt in July 1967.

== Passenger statistics ==
In fiscal 2017, the station was used by an average of 254 passengers daily (boarding passengers only).

== Surrounding area ==
- former Chiyokawa Village Hall
- Chiyokawa Post Office
- National Route 125

== Surrounding area ==
- Shimotsuma Road Station

== See also ==
- List of railway stations in Japan
