= Ishige Station =

Railway station in Jōsō, Ibaraki Prefecture, Japan

Ishige Station 石下駅
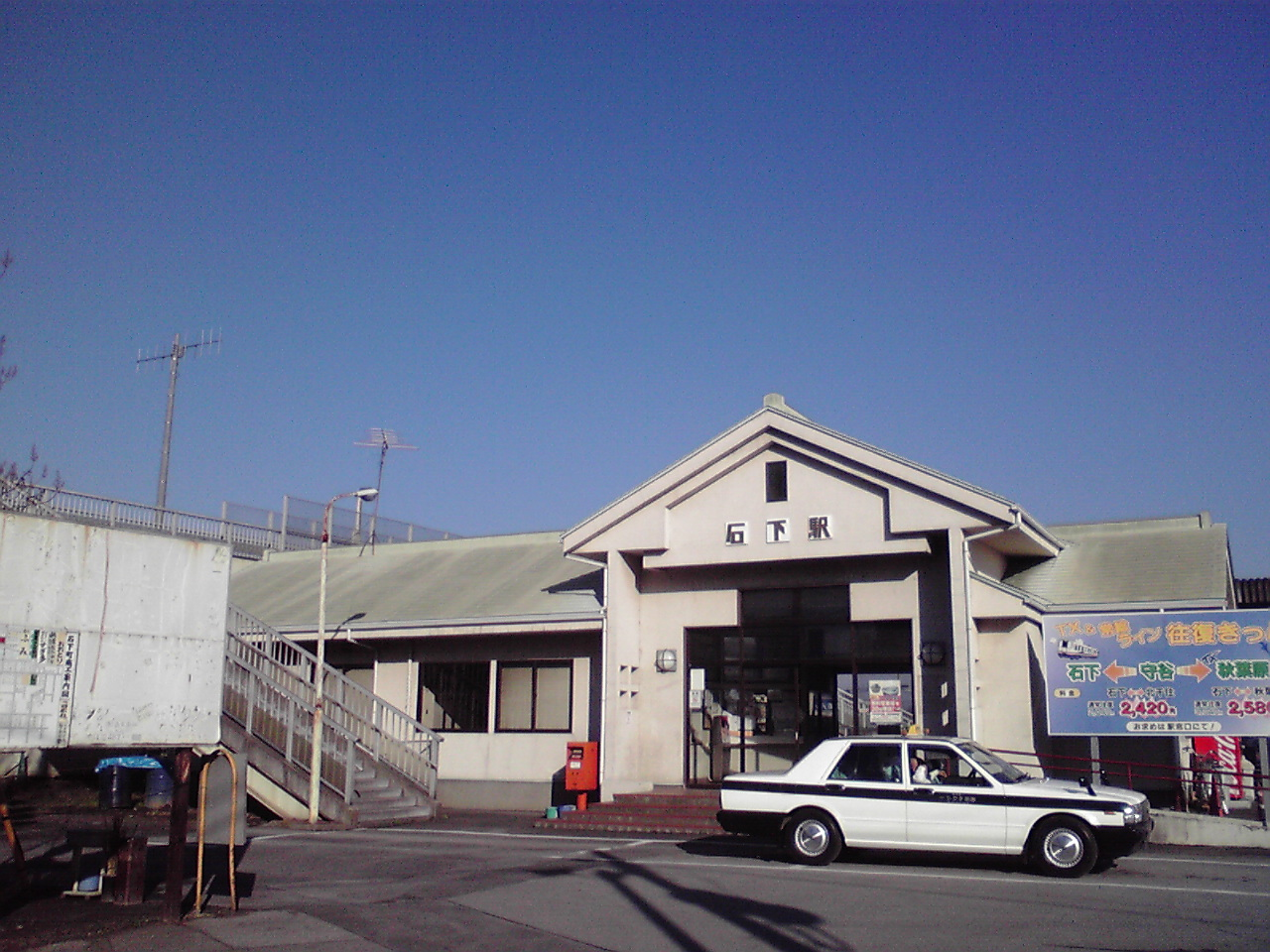
- Ishige Station, December 2009

General information
- Location: Shin-Ishige 376-1, Jōsō-shi, Ibaraki-ken 300-2706; Japan
- Coordinates: 36.1170°N 139.9746°E
- Operator: Kantō Railway
- Line: ■ Jōsō Line
- Distance: 28.8 km from Toride
- Platforms: 2 side platforms

Other information
- Website: Official website

History
- Opened: 1 November 1913; 112 years ago

Passengers
- FY2017: 854

Services
Preceding station	Kantō Railway	Following station
Mitsukaidō towards Toride	Jōsō Line Rapid	Shimotsuma towards Shimodate
Minami-Ishige towards Toride	Jōsō Line Local	Tamamura towards Shimodate
Location
- Location within Ibaraki Prefecture Location within Japan

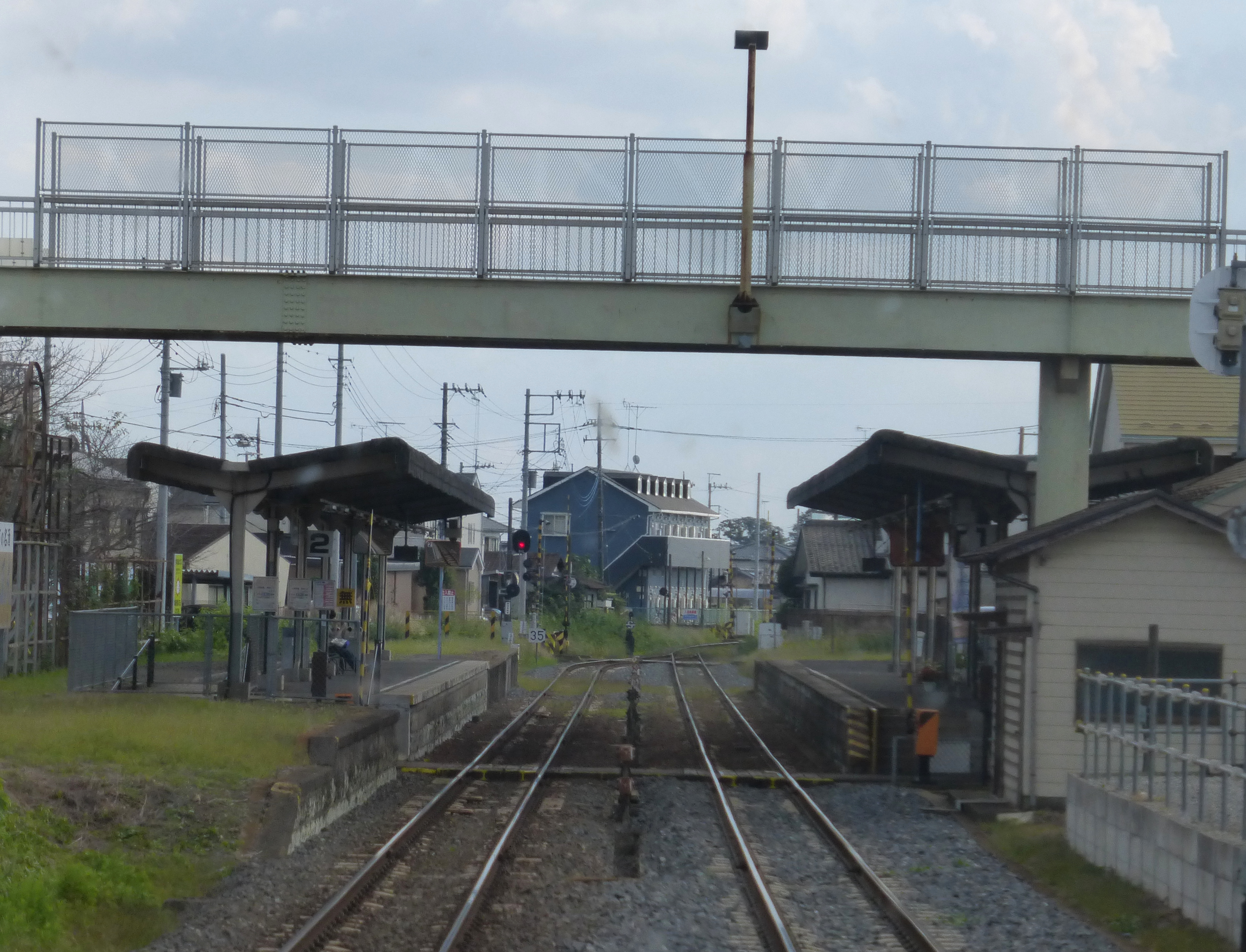
Platforms, 2016

Ishige Station (石下駅, Ishige-eki) is a passenger railway station in the city of Jōsō, Ibaraki Prefecture, Japan operated by the private railway company Kantō Railway.

== Lines ==
Ishige Station is a station on the Jōsō Line, and is located 28.8 km (17.9 mi) from the official starting point of the line at Toride Station.

== Station layout ==
The station has two opposed side platforms, connected to the station building by both a level crossing and a footbridge.

=== Platforms ===
1	■ Jōsō Line	for Shimodate
2	■ Jōsō Line	for Moriya and Toride

== History ==
Ishige Station was opened on 1 November 1913 as a station on the Jōsō Railroad, which became the Kantō Railway in 1965.

== Passenger statistics ==
In fiscal 2017, the station was used by an average of 854 passengers daily).

== Surrounding area ==
- former Ishige Town Hall
- Ishige Post Office

== See also ==
- List of railway stations in Japan
