= Jōsō =

Jōsō 常総市
- City
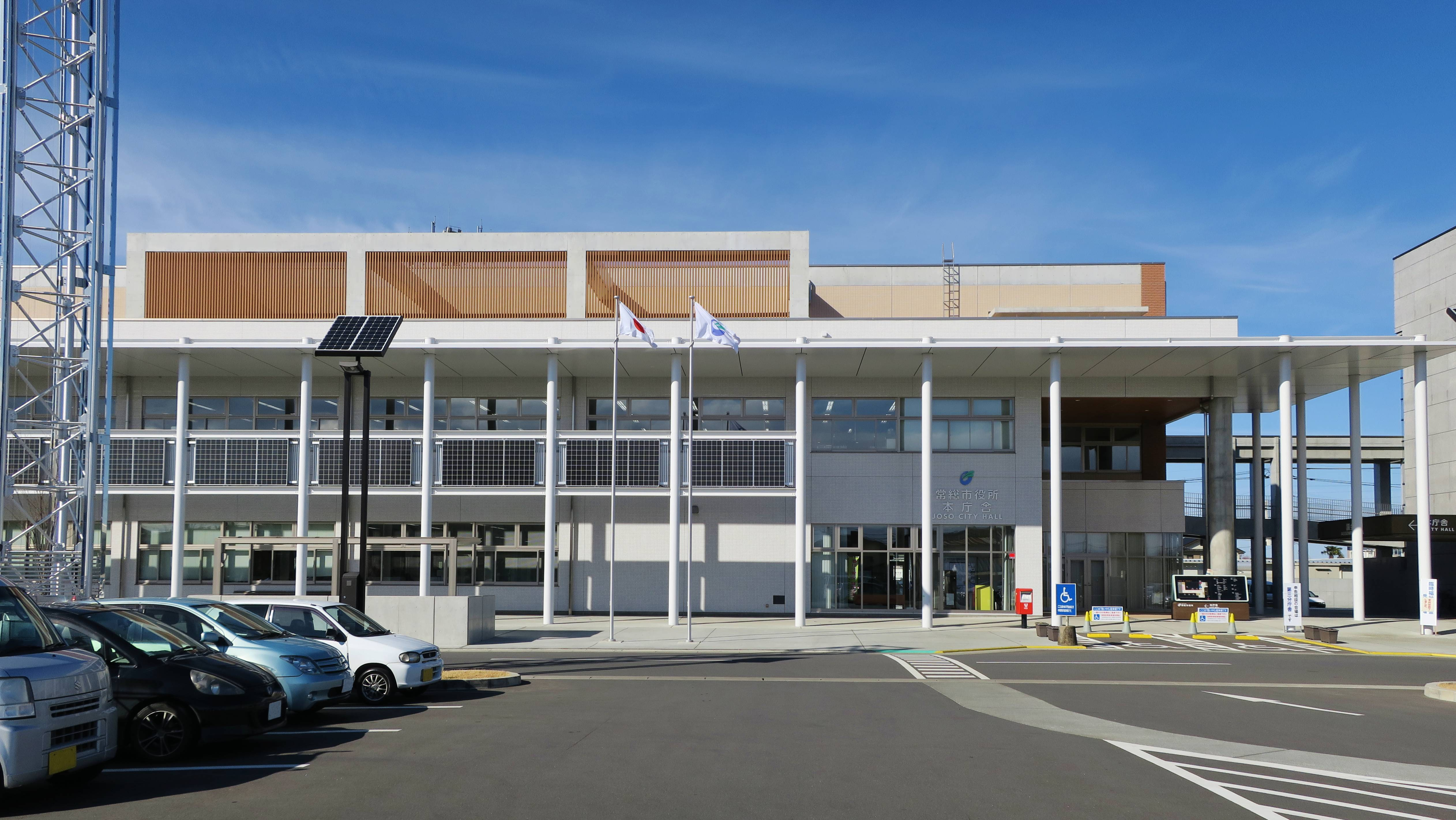
- Jōsō city hall

- Flag Seal

- Location of Jōsō in Ibaraki Prefecture

- Coordinates: 36°1′24.8″N 139°59′37.8″E
- Country: Japan
- Region: Kantō
- Prefecture: Ibaraki

Area
  - Total: 123.64 km^{2} (47.74 sq mi)

Population (October 2020)
  - Total: 59,314
  - Density: 479.73/km^{2} (1,242.5/sq mi)
- Time zone: UTC+9 (Japan Standard Time)
- Tree: Oak
- Flower: Sakura
- Bird: Japanese bush warbler
- Phone number: 0297-23-2111
- Address: 3222-3 Mitsukaido Suwa-cho, Jōsō-shi, Ibaraki-ken 303-8501
- Website: Official website

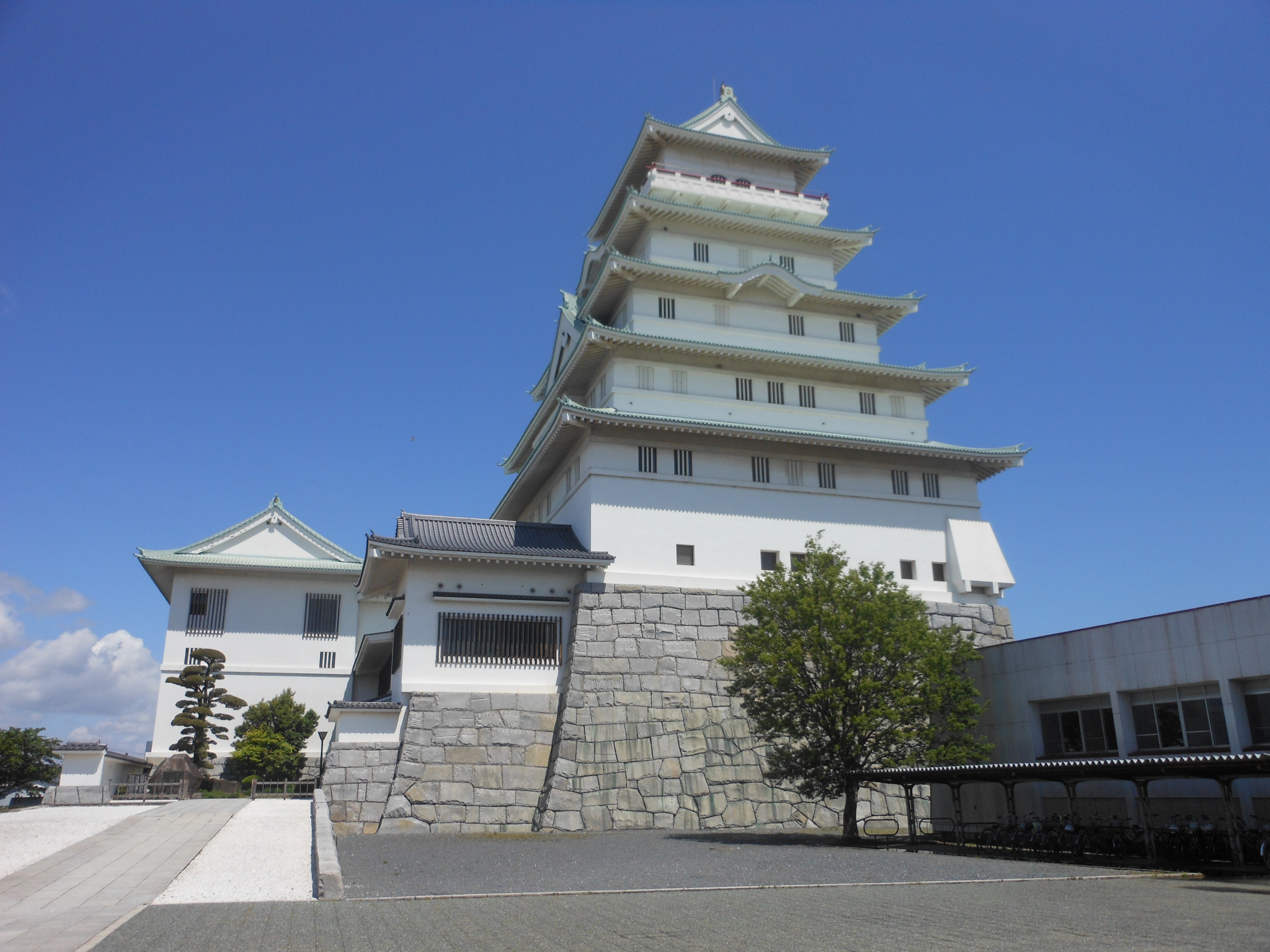
Jōsō city regional exchange center

Jōsō (常総市, Jōsō-shi) is a city located in Ibaraki Prefecture, Japan. As of 1 October 2020, the city had an estimated population of 59,314 in 21,168 households and a population density of 480 persons per km^{2}. The percentage of the population aged over 65 was 38.8%. The total area of the city is 123.64 square kilometres (47.74 sq mi). The city has a large expatriate population from Brazil.

== Geography ==
Jōsō is located in southwestern Ibaraki Prefecture, approximately 50 kilometers north of central Tokyo and 70 kilometers from the prefectural capital at Mito. Most of the city is flat, with an average elevation of 10 to 20 meters above sea level. The Kinugawa River flows through the city.

=== Surrounding municipalities ===
Chiba Prefecture

- Noda

Ibaraki Prefecture

- Bandō
- Moriya
- Shimotsuma
- Tsukuba
- Tsukubamirai
- Yachiyo

=== Climate ===
Jōsō has a humid subtropical climate (Köppen Cfa) characterized by warm summers and cool winters with light snowfall. The average annual temperature in Jōsō is 14.2 °C. The average annual rainfall is 1302 mm with September as the wettest month. The temperatures are highest on average in August, at around 26.2 °C, and lowest in January, at around 3.1 °C.

== Demographics ==
Per Japanese census data, the population of Jōsō peaked around the year 2000 and has declined slightly since.

Historical population
Year	Pop.	±%
1950	62,874	—
1960	56,881	−9.5%
1970	55,152	−3.0%
1980	60,809	+10.3%
1990	64,344	+5.8%
2000	66,245	+3.0%
2010	65,320	−1.4%
2020	60,834	−6.9%

== History ==
During the Edo period, the area was part of Shimōsa Province, and Mitsukaido village developed as a center for river transportation on the Kinugawa River. The town of Mitsukaidō was established within Toyoda District with the creation of the modern municipalities system on April 1, 1889. The area was transferred to Yūki District in 1894. On July 10, 1954, Mitsukaidō merged with the villages of Sugawara, Ohanawa, Mitsuma, Goka, Ono and Sakate, and was elevated to city status. It further annexed the villages of Sugao and Uchimoriya on April 1, 1956.

On January 1, 2006, Mitsukaidō absorbed the neighboring town of Ishige, Yūki District, Ibaraki and officially changed their name to Jōsō. The area suffered much damage from flooding of the Kinugawa River due to heavy rains in September 2015.

== Government ==
Jōsō has a mayor-council form of government with a directly elected mayor and a unicameral city council of 22 members. Jōsō, together with neighboring Yachiyo, contributes two members to the Ibaraki Prefectural Assembly. In terms of national politics, the city is part of Ibaraki 7th district of the lower house of the Diet of Japan.

== Economy ==
Jōsō has a mixed economy, with three large industrial parks; however, 50% of the city's area is farmland.

== Education ==
Jōsō has 14 public elementary schools and five public middle schools operated by the city government, and three public high schools operated by the Ibaraki Prefectural Board of Education.

In additional there are two Brazilian schools: Escola e Creche Grupo Opção and Escola Taiyo One more Brazilian primary school (UBEK – Unidade Brasileira de Ensino Kanto) is now closed

== Transportation ==
=== Railway ===
Kantō Railway Jōsō Line

- Mitsukaidō - Kita-Mitsukaidō - Nakatsuma - Mitsuma - Minami-Ishige - Ishige - Tamamura

=== Highway ===
- Ken-Ō Expressway
- National Route 294
- National Route 354

== Notable people from Jōsō ==
- Michiko Hada, actress
- Kazuhiko Hosokawa, professional golfer
- Akira Kazami, politician
- Atsushi Koyano, scholar of contemporary literature
- Yuko Matsuoka,– comedian
- Takashi Nagatsuka, writer, poet
- Tomi Okawa, table tennis player
- Takashi Ono, judoka
- Keiji Suzuki, judoka
