= Yachiyo, Ibaraki =

Yachiyo 八千代町
- Town
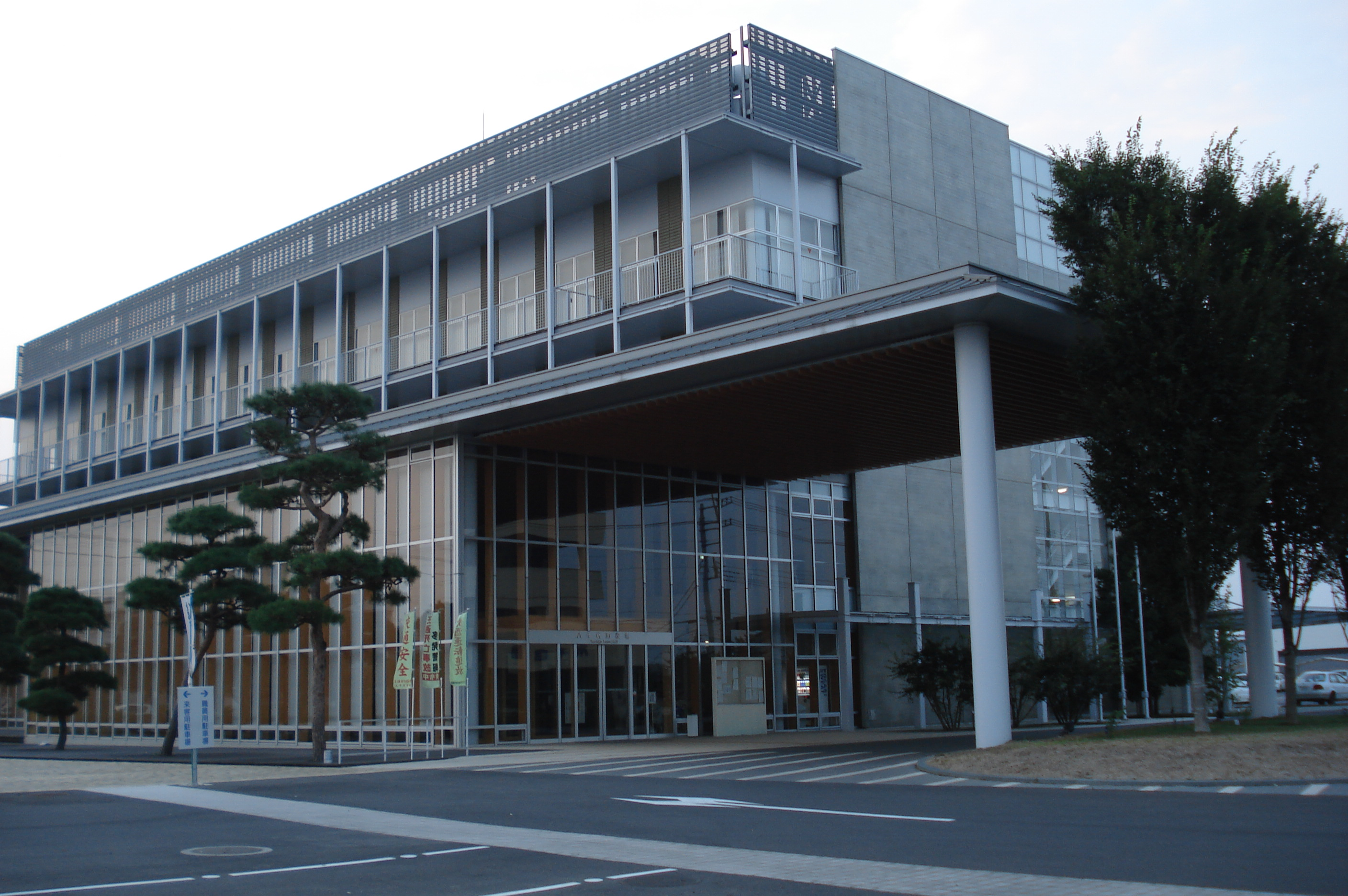
- Yachiyo town office

- Flag Seal

- Location of Yachiyo in Ibaraki Prefecture

- Coordinates: 36°10′53.8″N 139°53′28″E
- Country: Japan
- Region: Kantō
- Prefecture: Ibaraki
- District: Yūki

Area
  - Total: 58.99 km^{2} (22.78 sq mi)

Population (October 2020)
  - Total: 20,882
  - Density: 354.0/km^{2} (916.8/sq mi)
- Time zone: UTC+9 (Japan Standard Time)
- Tree: Keyaki
- Flower: Chrysanthemum
- Bird: Eurasian skylark
- Phone number: 0296-48-1111
- Address: 1170 Sugenoya, Yachiyo-machi, Yūki-gun, Ibaraki-ken 300-3592
- Website: Official website

Yachiyo (八千代町, Yachiyo-machi) is a town located in Ibaraki Prefecture, Japan. As of 1 October 2020, the town had an estimated population of 20,882 in 7,176 households and a population density of 354 persons per km². The percentage of the population aged over 65 was 30.7%. The total area of the town is 58.99 square kilometres (22.78 sq mi).

== Geography ==
Yachiyo is located in the western part of Ibaraki prefecture, almost in the center of the Kantō Plain. It is about 60 kilometers to Tokyo and about 70 kilometers to the prefectural capital of Mito. The Kinugawa River flows through the town,

=== Surrounding municipalities ===
Ibaraki Prefecture

- Bandō
- Chikusei
- Koga
- Shimotsuma
- Yūki

=== Climate ===
Yachiyo has a humid continental climate (Köppen Cfa) characterized by warm summers and cool winters with little snowfall. The average annual temperature in Yachiyo is 14.9 °C. The average annual rainfall is 1394 mm with September as the wettest month. The temperatures are highest on average in August, at around 26.5 °C, and lowest in January, at around 4.5 °C.

== Demographics ==
Per Japanese census data, the population of Yachiyo has remained relatively stable over the past 70 years.

Historical population
| Year | Pop. | ±% |
|---|---|---|
| 1950 | 26,486 | — |
| 1960 | 24,438 | −7.7% |
| 1970 | 21,945 | −10.2% |
| 1980 | 22,845 | +4.1% |
| 1990 | 24,351 | +6.6% |
| 2000 | 24,352 | +0.0% |
| 2010 | 23,106 | −5.1% |
| 2020 | 22,026 | −4.7% |

== History ==
During the Edo period, the area around Yachiyo was part of Shimōsa Province. It was transferred to Hitachi Province in 1875.

With the creation of the municipalities system after the Meiji Restoration on April 1, 1889, the villages of Nakayūki and Shimoyūki were created within Yūki District of Ibaraki Prefecture, as well as the village of Anjō in Okada District and Kawanishi in Makabe District, and Nishitoyoda in Toyoda District. These five villages merged to form the village of Yachiyo on January 1, 1955. Yachiyo was elevated to town status on February 1, 1972.

== Government ==
Yachiyo has a mayor-council form of government with a directly elected mayor and a unicameral town council of 14 members. Yachiyo, together with neighboring Jōsō, contributes two members to the Ibaraki Prefectural Assembly. In terms of national politics, the town is part of Ibaraki 7th district of the lower house of the Diet of Japan.

== Economy ==
The local economy is dominated by agriculture. The town is noted for its production of Chinese cabbage.

== Education ==
Yachiyo has five public elementary schools, two public middle schools operated by the town government, and one public high school operated by the Ibaraki Prefectural Board of Education.

== Transportation ==
=== Railway ===
- Yachiyo does not have any passenger train service.

=== Highway ===
- National Route 125

== Noted people from Yachiyo ==
- Shigeo Nakajima, boxer
- Hiroyuki Takasaki, professional soccer player
