= Kamisu =

Kamisu 神栖市
- City
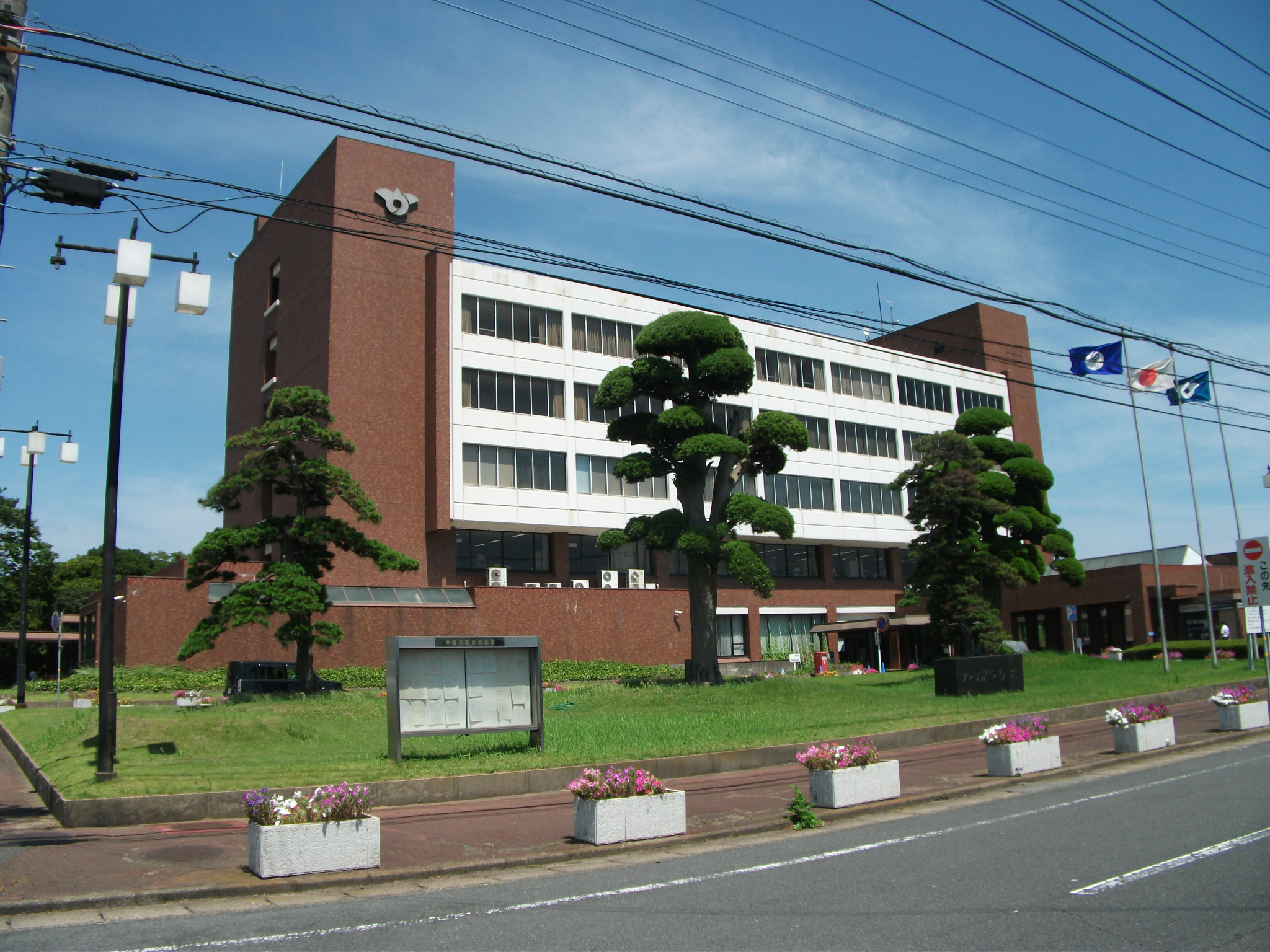
- Kamisu city hall

- Flag Emblem

- Location of Kamisu in Ibaraki Prefecture

- Coordinates: 35°53′23.8″N 140°39′52.3″E
- Country: Japan
- Region: Kantō
- Prefecture: Ibaraki
- First official recorded: 290 AD
- City Settled: August 1, 2005

Government
  - Mayor: Susumu Ishida (from December 2017)

Area
  - Total: 146.94 km^{2} (56.73 sq mi)

Population (October 2020)
  - Total: 95,396
  - Density: 649.22/km^{2} (1,681.5/sq mi)
- Time zone: UTC+9 (Japan Standard Time)
- Tree: Podocarpaceae
- Flower: Sarcandra glabra
- Bird: Japanese bush warbler
- Phone number: 0299-90-1111
- Address: 4991-5, Mizoguchi, Kamisu-shi, Ibaraki-ken 314-0192
- Website: Official website

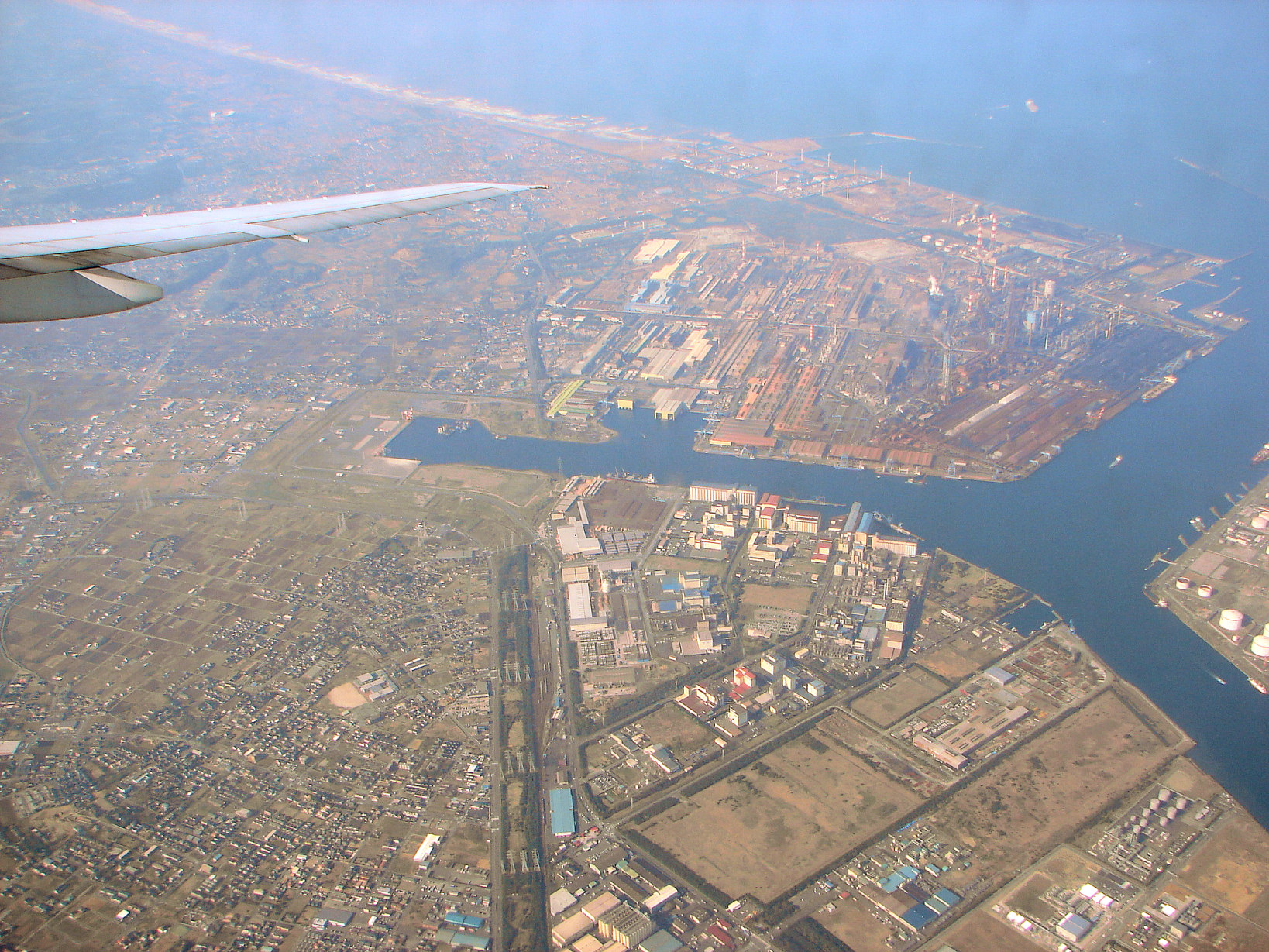
Industry and harbour of Kamisu

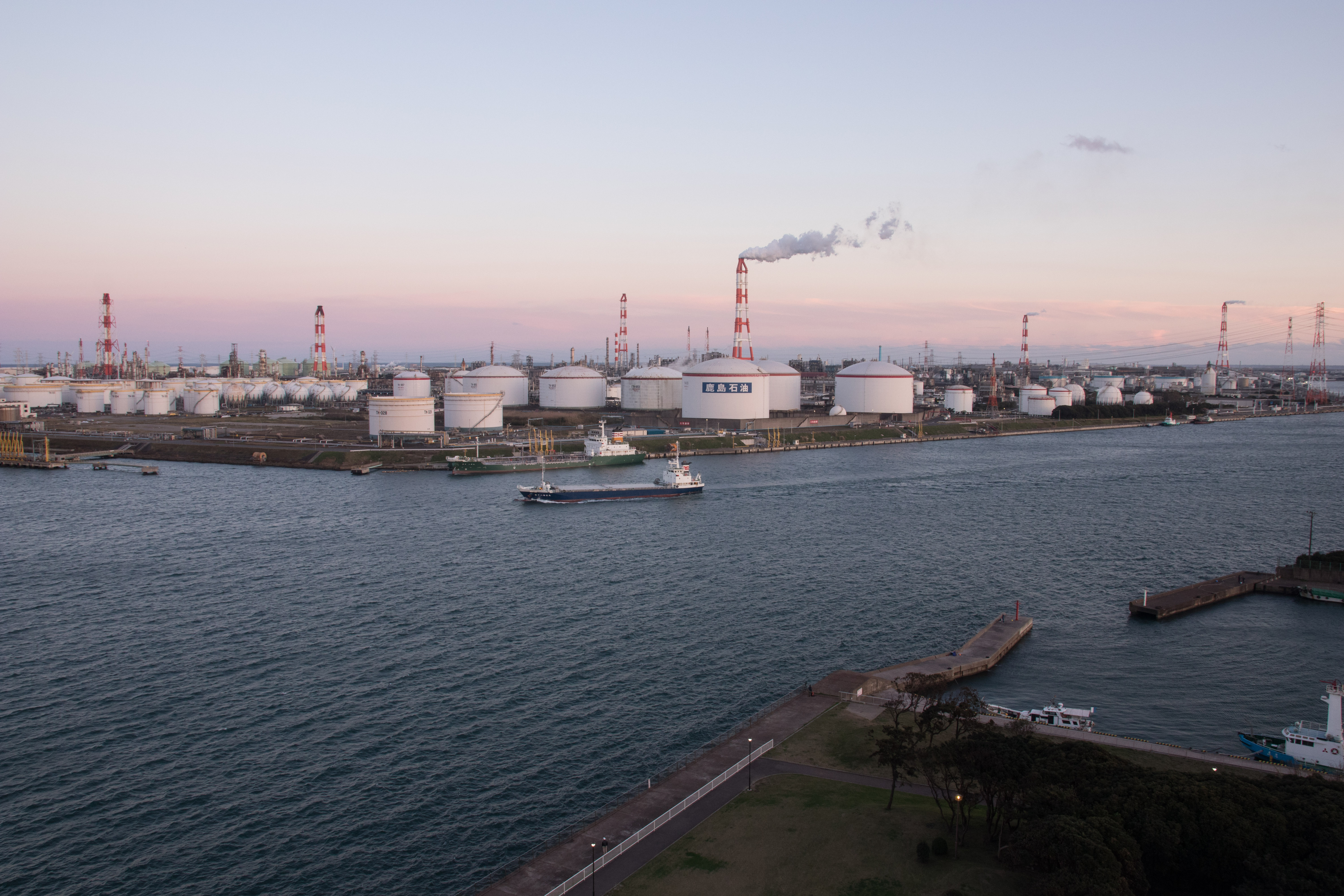
Kashima Refinery

Kamisu (神栖市, Kamisu-shi) is a city located in Ibaraki Prefecture, Japan. As of 1 July 2020, the city had an estimated population of 95,384 in 40,759 households and a population density of 649 persons per km^{2}. The percentage of the population aged over 65 was 23.6%. The total area of the city is 146.97 square kilometres (56.75 sq mi).

== Geography ==
Kamisu is located in the extreme southeastern portion of Ibaraki Prefecture. The city forms a rough triangle, with Chiba Prefecture on the western side and the Pacific Ocean on the east. The Tone River flows through the city.

=== Surrounding municipalities ===
Chiba Prefecture

- Chōshi
- Katori
- Tōnoshō

Ibaraki Prefecture

- Itako
- Kashima

=== Climate ===
Kamisu has a humid subtropical climate (Köppen Cfa) characterized by warm summers and cool winters with light snowfall. The average annual temperature in Kamisu is 14.8 °C. The average annual rainfall is 1508 mm with September as the wettest month. The temperatures are highest on average in August, at around 25.7 °C, and lowest in January, at around 4.7 °C.

== Demographics ==
Per Japanese census data, the population of Kamisu has recently plateaued after decades of strong growth.

Historical population
Year	Pop.	±%
1920	24,725	—
1930	26,847	+8.6%
1940	30,295	+12.8%
1950	41,331	+36.4%
1960	41,030	−0.7%
1970	49,360	+20.3%
1980	67,364	+36.5%
1990	77,596	+15.2%
2000	87,626	+12.9%
2010	94,795	+8.2%
2020	95,454	+0.7%

== History ==
The village of Kamisu was established within Kashima District by the merger of the villages of Ikisu and Karuno on March 1, 1955. It was elevated to town status on January 1, 1970. The city of Kamisu was established on August 1, 2005, from the merger of the town of Kamisu and the town of Hasaki (also from Kashima District).

== Government ==
Kamisu has a mayor-council form of government with a directly elected mayor and a unicameral city council of 23 members. Kamisu contributes two members to the Ibaraki Prefectural Assembly. In terms of national politics, the city is part of Ibaraki 2nd district of the lower house of the Diet of Japan.

== Economy ==
Kamisu has a large industrial base, with many chemical, petrochemical, specialty chemical plants, and refineries. The city is part of the Kashima Rinkai Industrial Zone. The Kashima Power Station is also located in Kamisu.

== Education ==
Kamisu has 14 public elementary schools and eight public middle schools operated by the city government, and three public high schools operated by the Ibaraki Prefectural Board of Education.

== Transportation ==
=== Railway ===
- Kamisu is served by the Kashima Rinkai Railway Kashima Rinkō Line, an all-freight railway line. The city does not have any passenger railway service.

=== Highway ===
- National Route 124

=== Seaport ===
- Port of Kashima

== Sister city ==
Kamisu has one sister city, Eureka, California, since 1991.

== Local attractions ==
- Ikisu Jinja
- Gonoike Ryokuchi Park

== Notable people ==
- Mitsutoshi Furuya, manga artist
- Kazuhiko Hosokawa, golfer
- Daichi Ishikawa, football player
- Naoya Ishigami, soccer player
- Kosuke Iwase, football player
- Sanae Jōnouchi, enka singer
- Akira Kazami, politician
- Atsushi Koyano, scholar of contemporary literature
- Yuto Koizumi, football player
- Takashi Nagatsuka, writer, poet
- Tomi Okawa, table tennis player
- Takashi Ono, judoka
- Keiji Suzuki, judoka and Olympic gold medalist
- Tsukushi – female wrestler
