= Ishige, Ibaraki =

Dissolved municipality in Yuki district, Ibaraki prefecture, Japan

Coordinates: 36°07′N 139°58′E

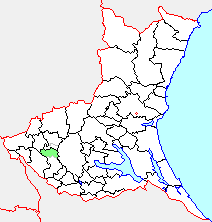
Map of Ishige, Ibaraki

Ishige (石下町, Ishige-machi) was a town located in Yūki District, Ibaraki Prefecture, Japan.

As of 2003, the town had an estimated population of 24,960 and a density of 569.34 persons per km^{2}. The total area was 43.84 km^{2}.

On January 1, 2006, Ishige merged with Mitsukaido; which was later renamed "Jōsō".
