= Ibaraki Prefecture =

Prefecture of Japan

Coordinates: 36°14′N 140°17′E

Ibaraki Prefecture 茨城県
- Prefecture

Japanese transcription(s)
  - Japanese: 茨城県
  - Rōmaji: Ibaraki-ken
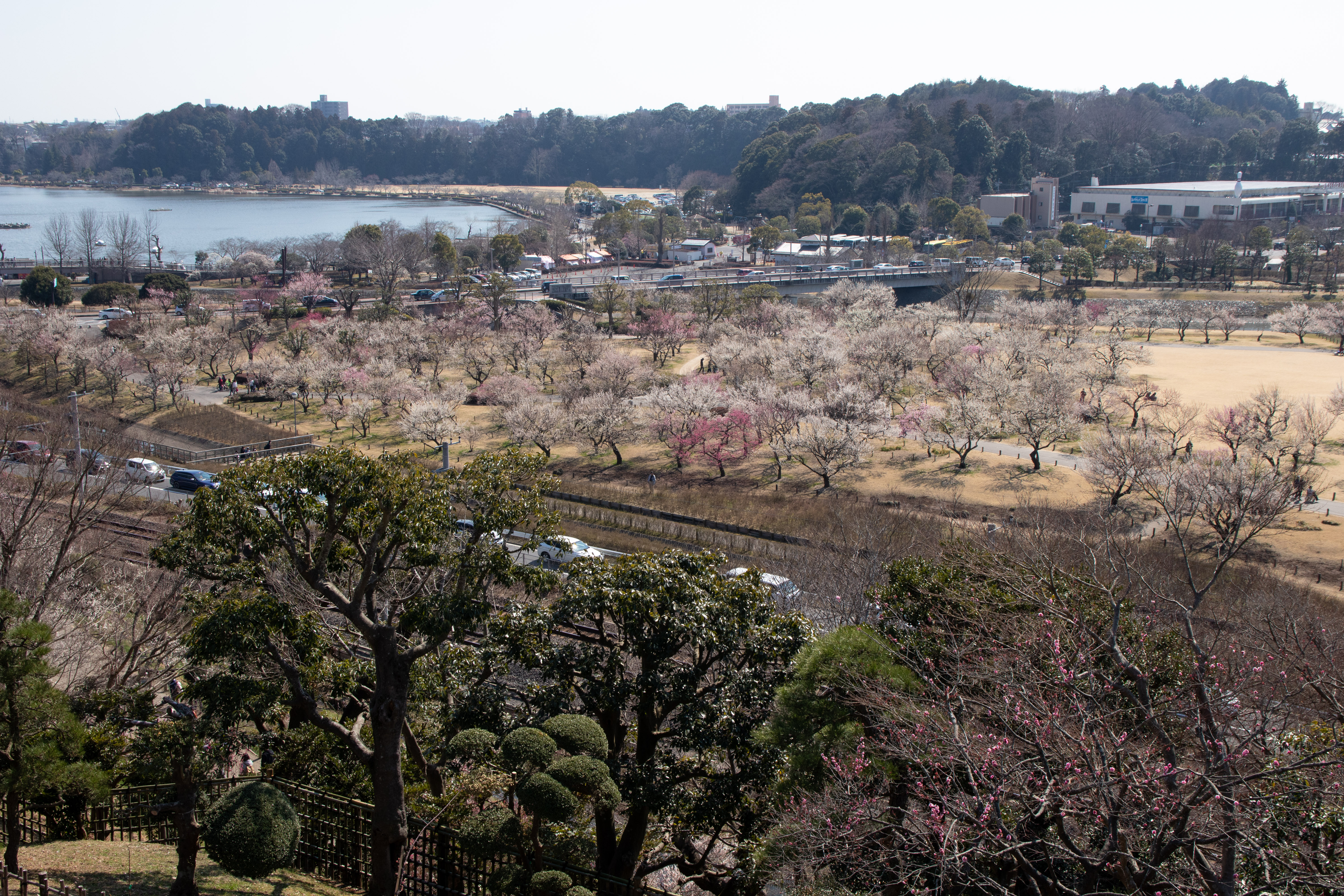
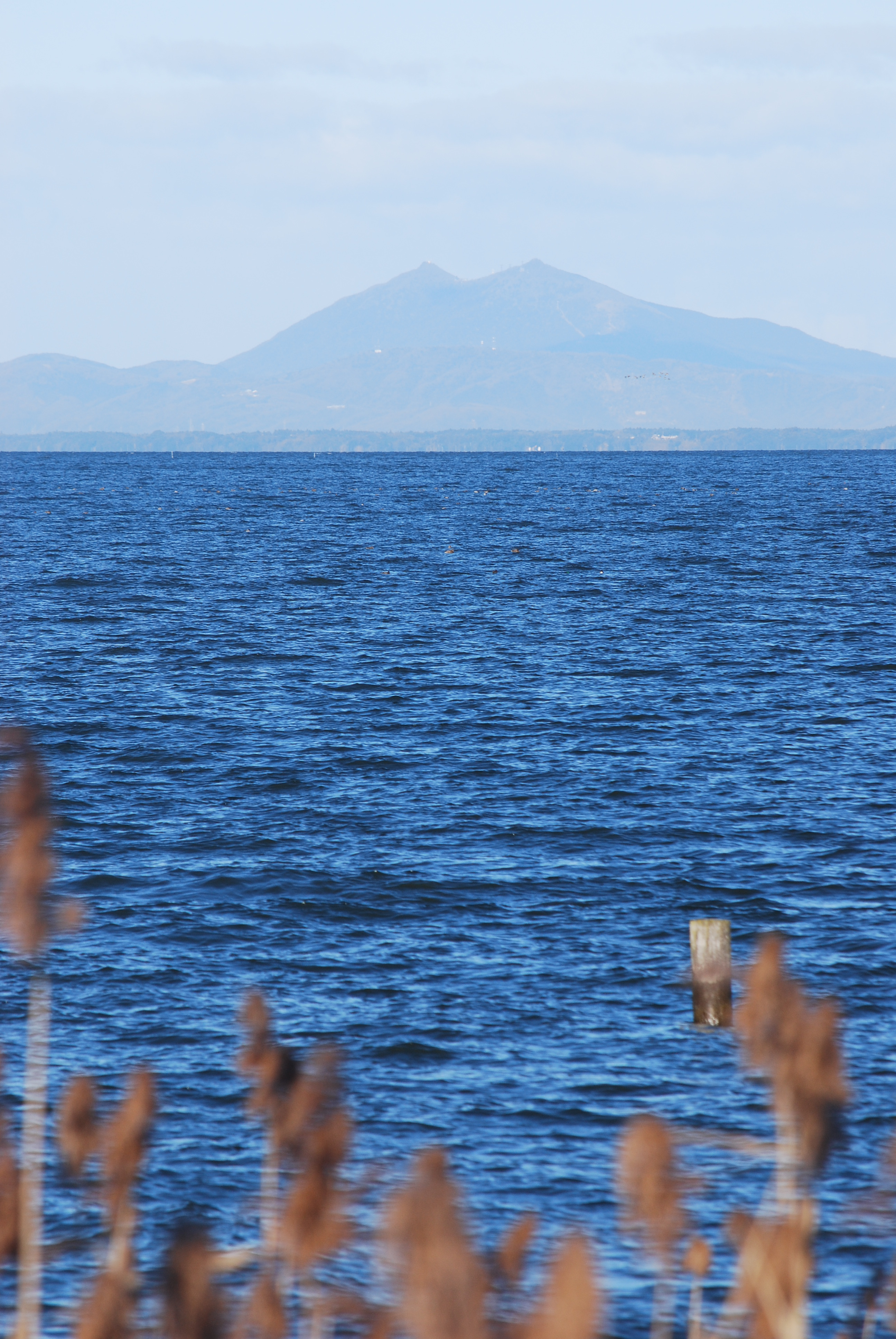
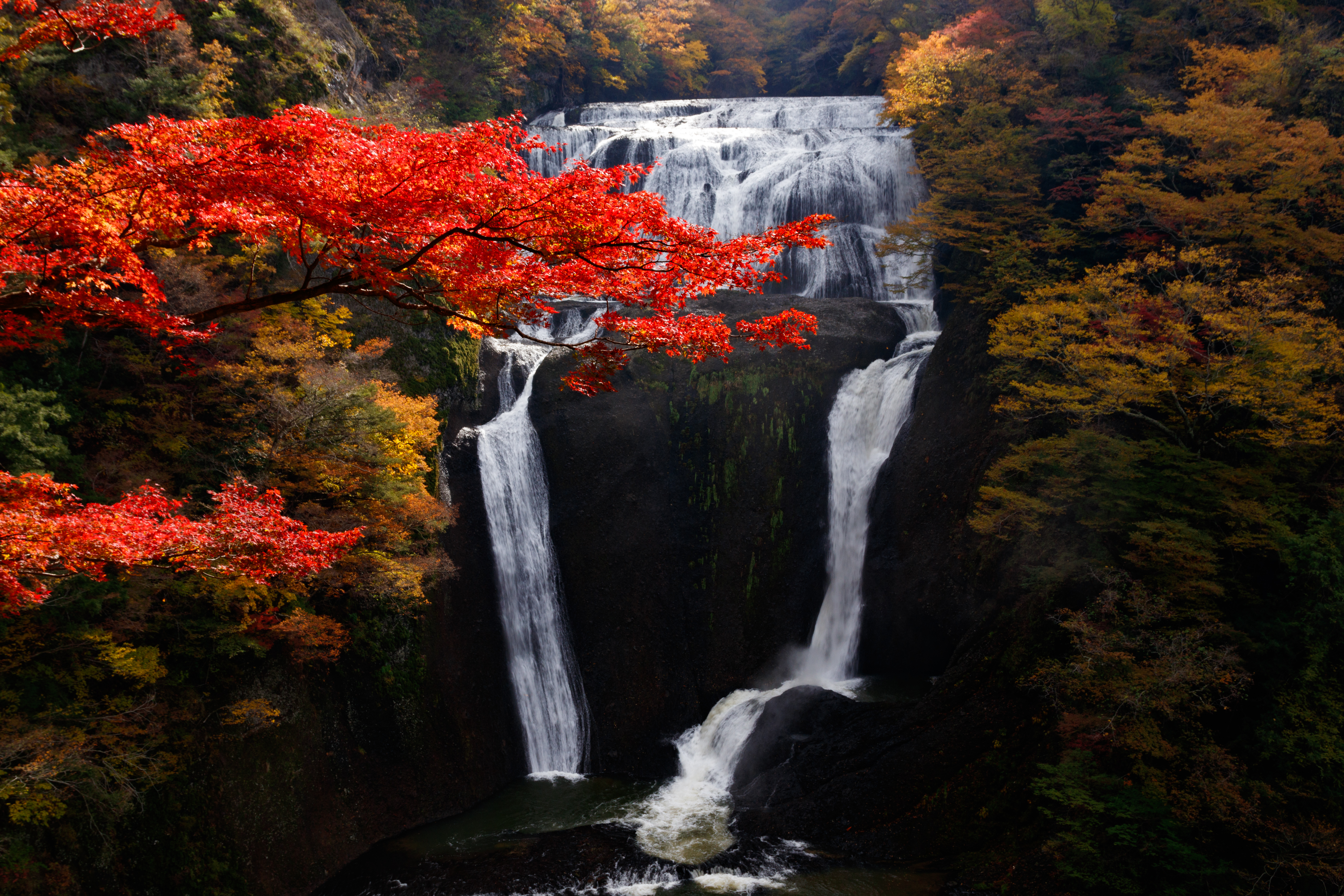
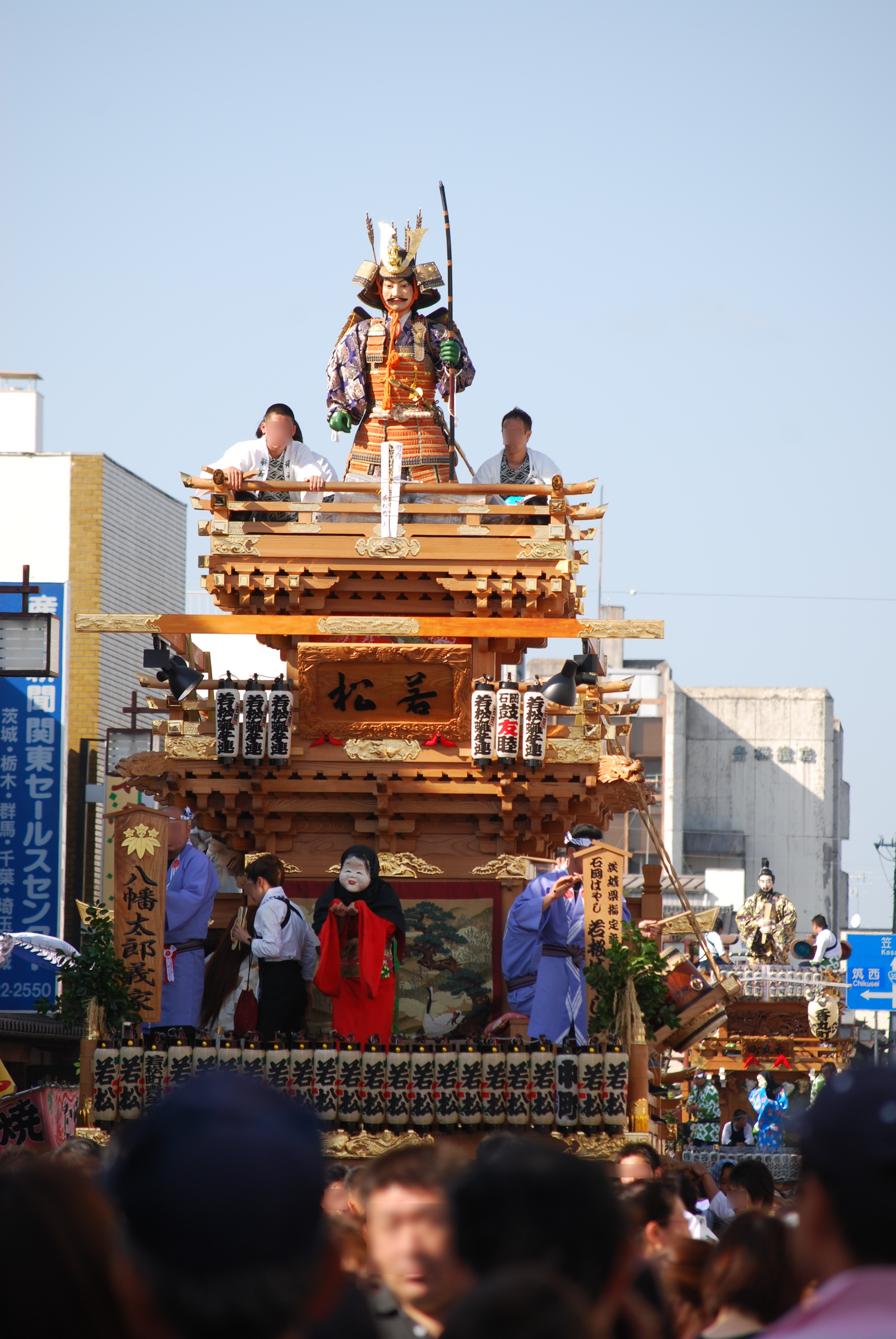
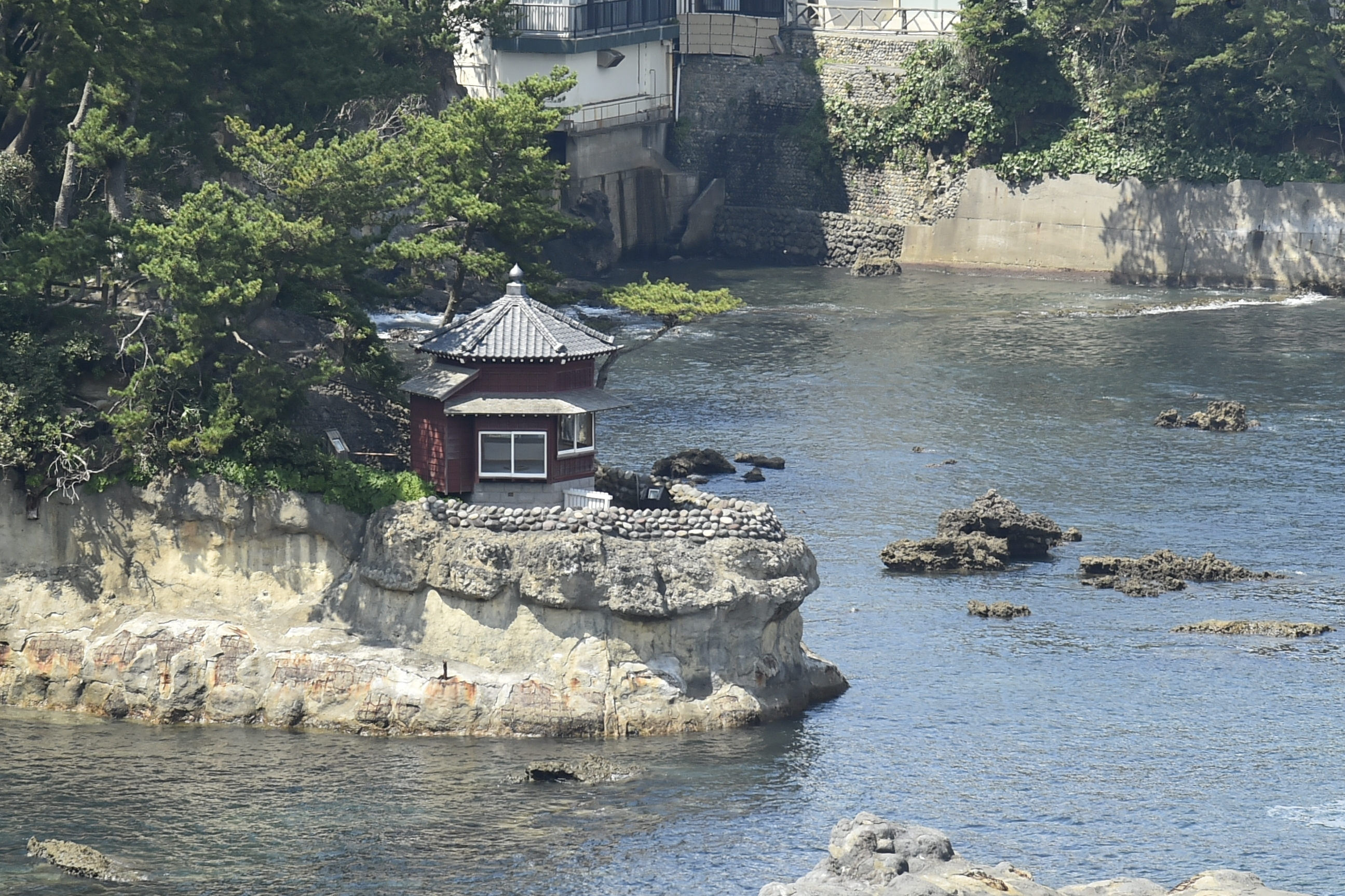
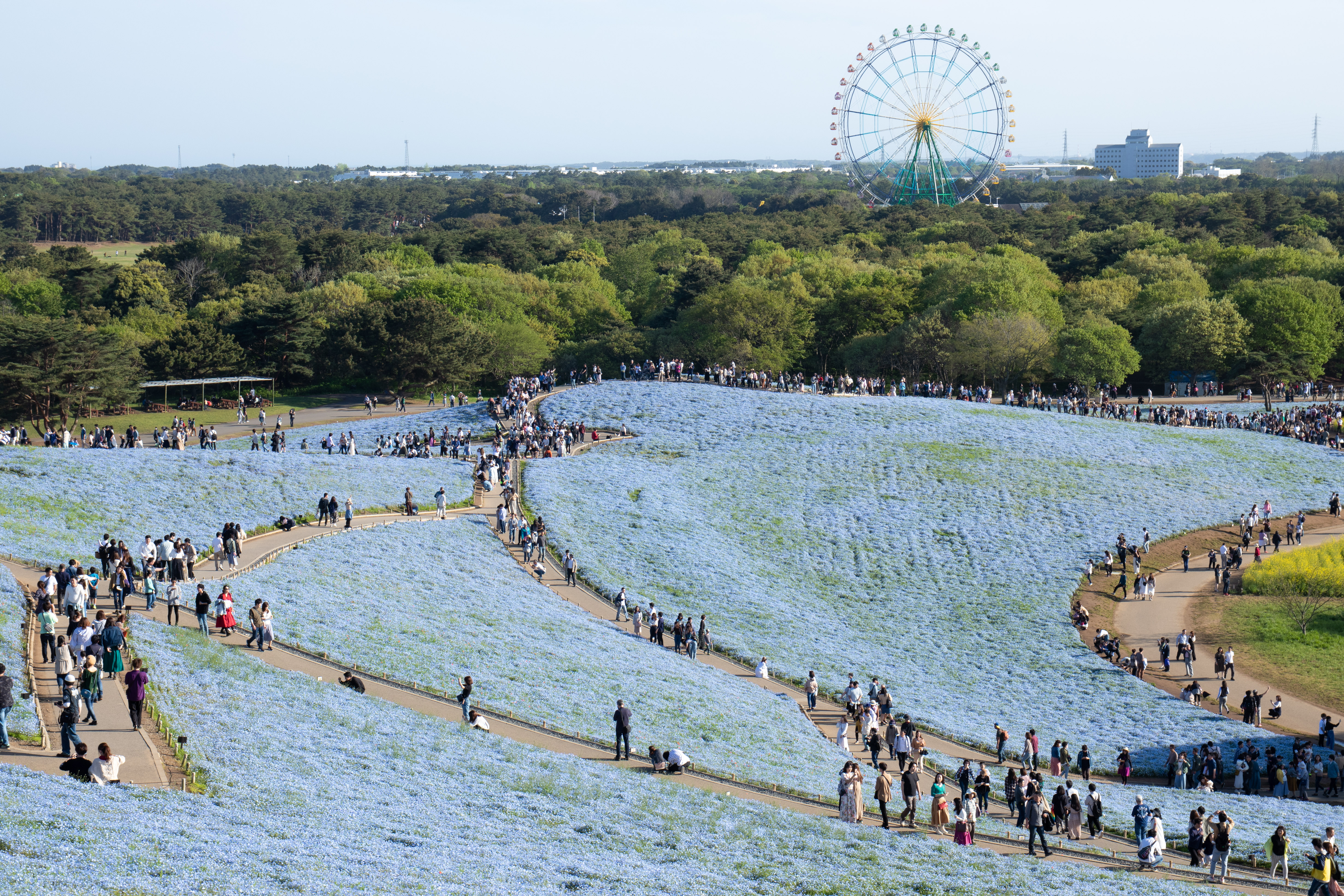
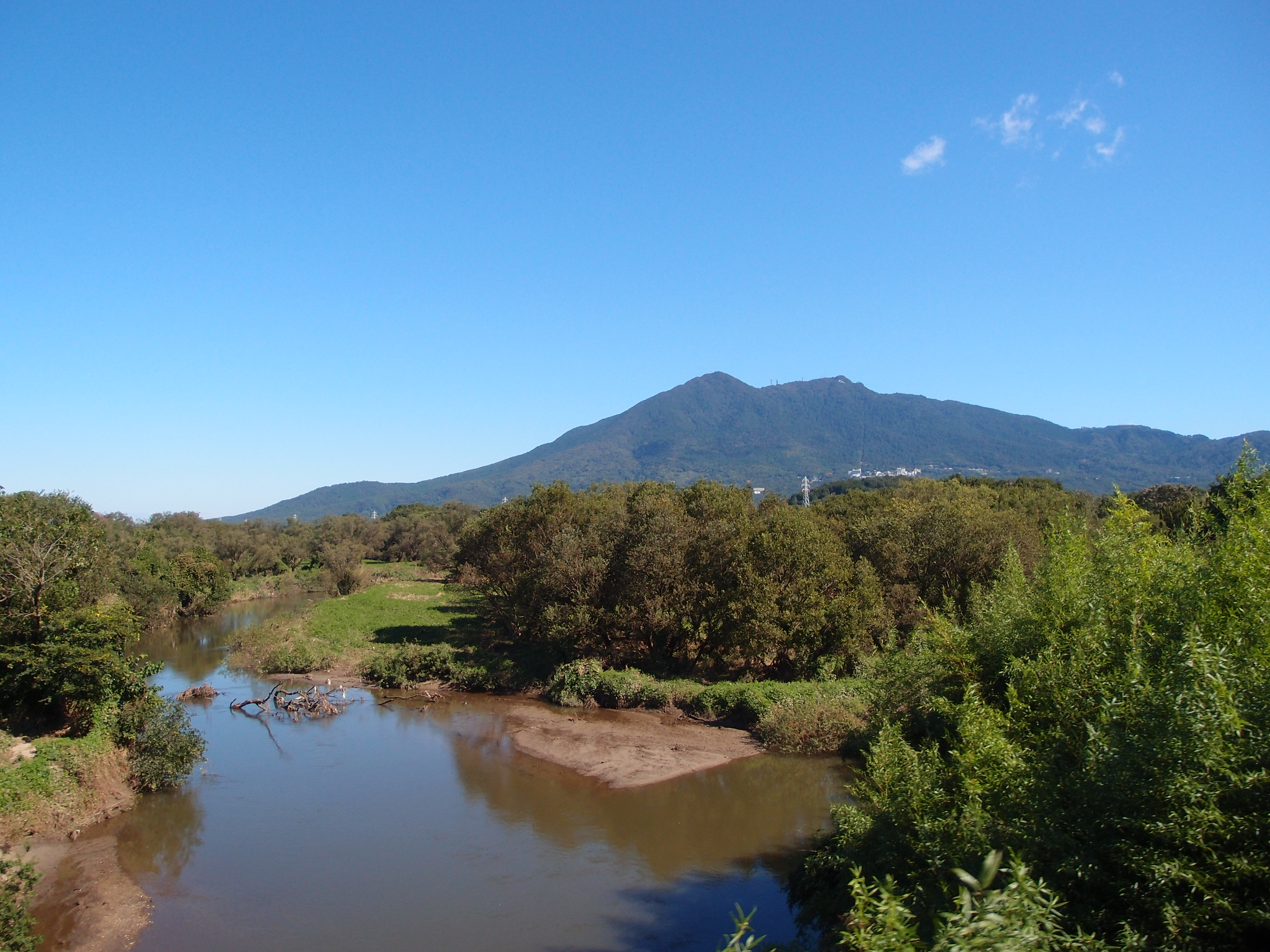
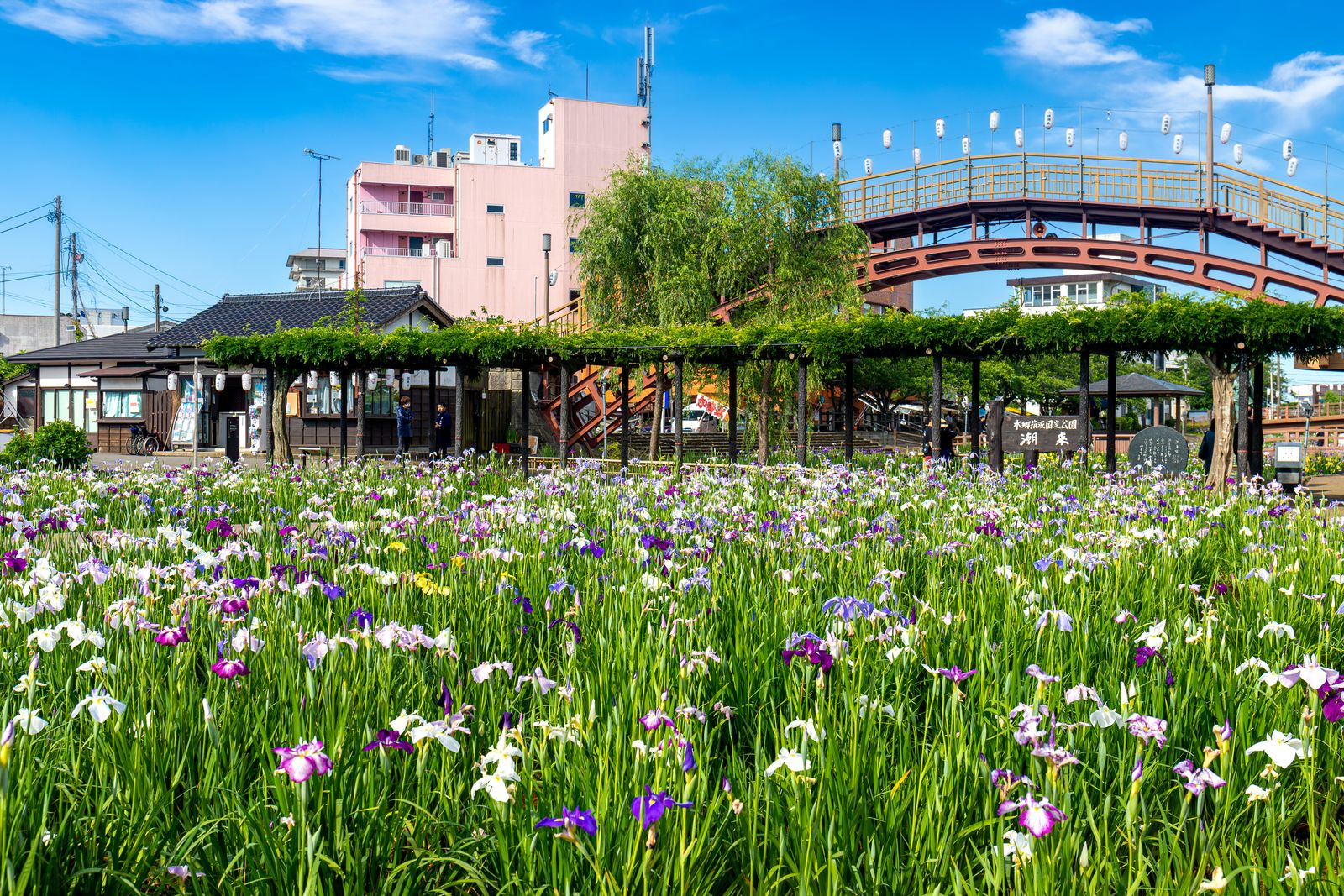
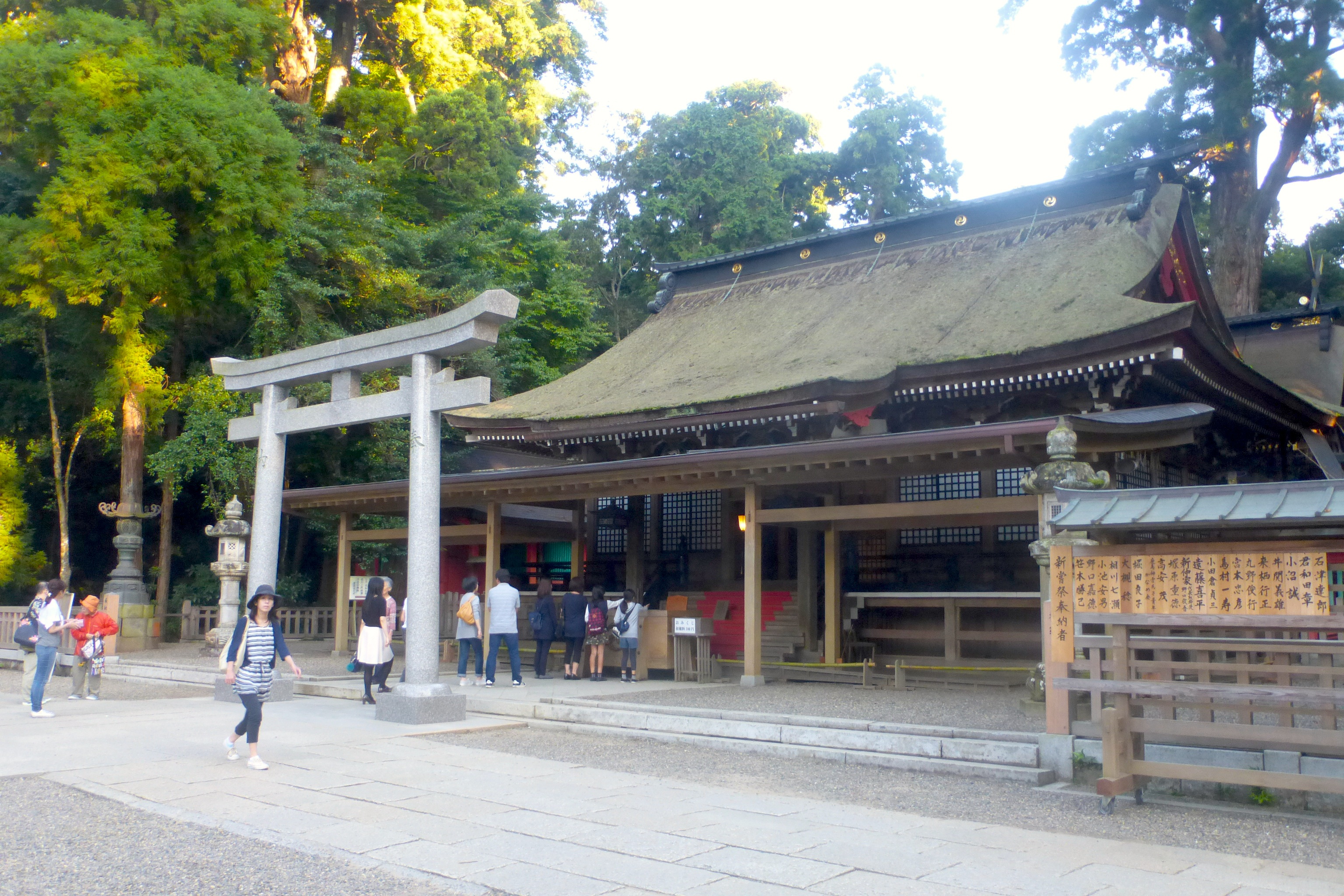
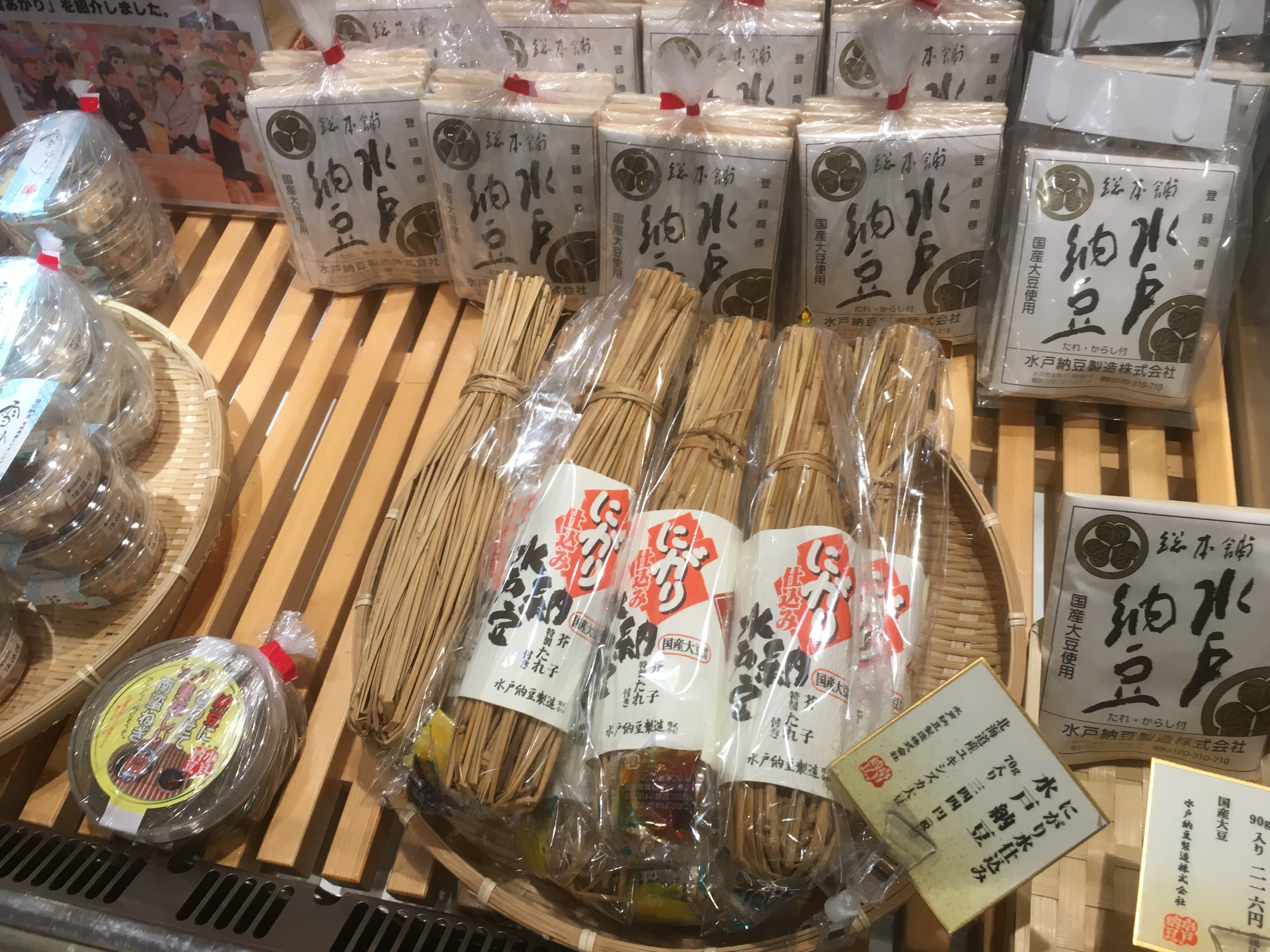
- Kairaku-en Garden Lake Kasumigaura and Mt. Tsukuba Fukuroda Falls; Daigo town (Kuji District) Ishioka Autumn Traditional Festival Rokkakudō of Kitaibaraki Hitachi Seaside Park Mount Tsukuba Suigō Itako Iris Garden Kashima Shrine Mito Natto

- Flag Symbol
- Anthem: Ibaraki kenmin no uta
- Country: Japan
- Island: Honshu
- Region: Kantō
- Prefecture: Ibaraki
- Capital: Mito
- Subdivisions: Districts: 7, Municipalities: 44

Government
  - Governor: Kazuhiko Ōigawa

Area
  - Total: 6,097.19 km^{2} (2,354.14 sq mi)
  - Rank: 24th

Population (November 1, 2025)
  - Total: 2,791,231
  - Rank: 11th
  - Density: 457.790/km^{2} (1,185.67/sq mi)
  - Dialect: Ibaraki dialect

GDP
  - Total: JP¥ 14,586 billion US$ 107.7 billion (2022)
- ISO 3166 code: JP-08
- Website: www.pref.ibaraki.jp
- Symbols of Ibaraki Prefecture
- Bird: Eurasian Skylark (Alauda arvensis)
- Flower: Rose (Rosa)
- Tree: Ume tree (Prunus mume)

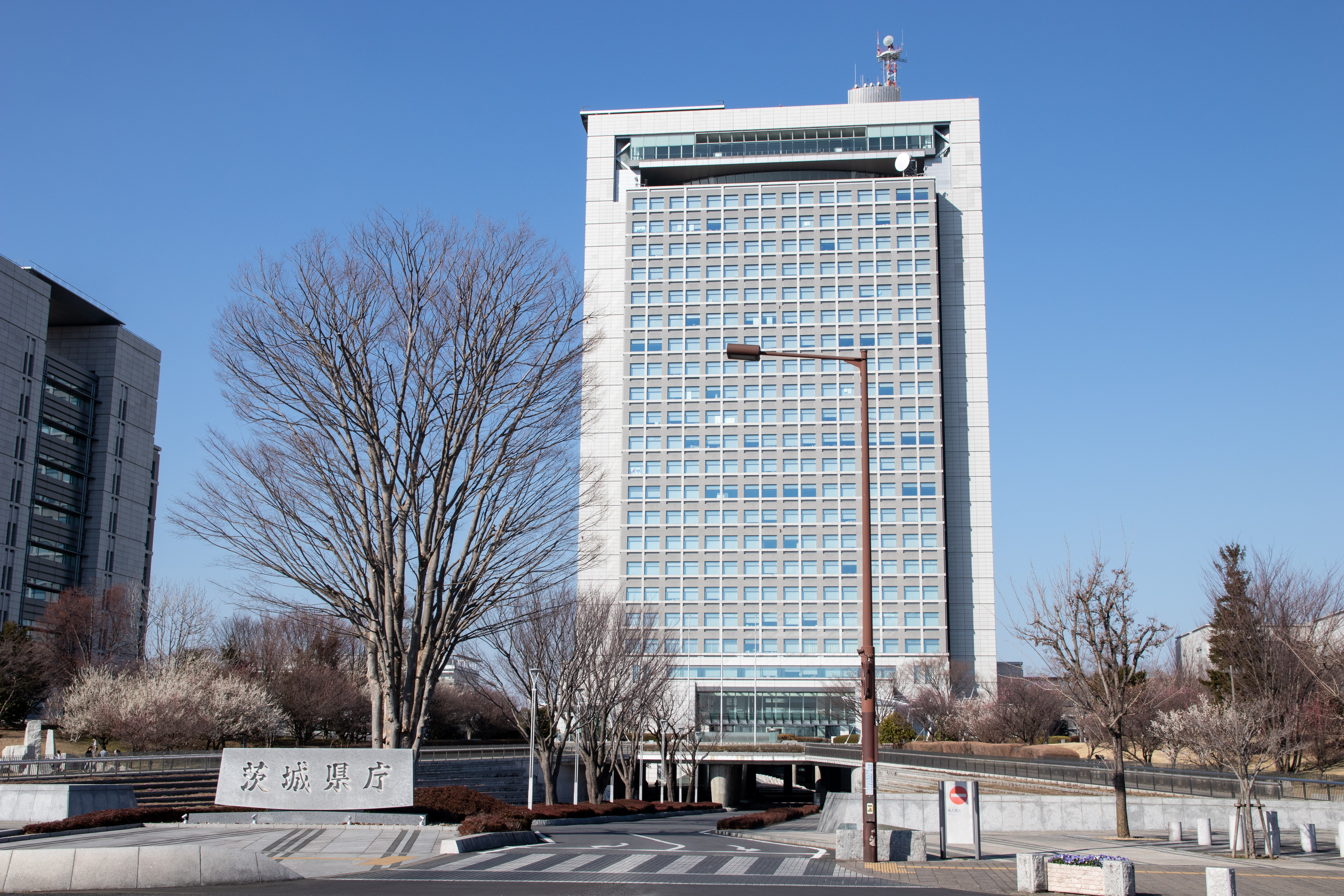
Ibaraki Prefectural Office and Headquarters in Mito

Ibaraki Prefecture (茨城県, Ibaraki-ken, -gi-; Japanese pronunciation: [ì.bä́.ɾä̀.k̟ʲì, -ɡ̟ʲì, -ŋ̟ʲì, -ɾä́.k̟ʲi̥.kè̞ɴ̀, -ɡ̟ʲí-, -ŋ̟ʲí-]) is a prefecture of Japan located in the Kantō region of Honshu. Ibaraki Prefecture has a population of 2,828,086 (1 July 2023) and has a geographic area of 6,097.19 square kilometres (2,354.14 square miles). Ibaraki Prefecture borders Fukushima Prefecture to the north, Tochigi Prefecture to the northwest, Saitama Prefecture to the southwest, Chiba Prefecture to the south, and the Pacific Ocean to the east.

Mito, the capital, is the largest city in Ibaraki Prefecture. Other major cities include Tsukuba, Hitachi, and Hitachinaka. Ibaraki Prefecture is located on Japan's eastern Pacific coast to the northeast of Tokyo, and is part of the Greater Tokyo Area, the most populous metropolitan area in the world. Ibaraki Prefecture features Lake Kasumigaura, the second-largest lake in Japan; the Tone River, Japan's second-longest river and largest drainage basin; and Mount Tsukuba, one of the most famous mountains in Japan. Ibaraki Prefecture is also home to Kairaku-en, one of the Three Great Gardens of Japan, and is an important center for the martial art of Aikido.

== History ==
Ibaraki Prefecture was previously known as Hitachi Province. In 1871, the name of the province became Ibaraki, and in 1875 it became its current size, by annexing some districts belonging to the extinct Shimōsa Province.

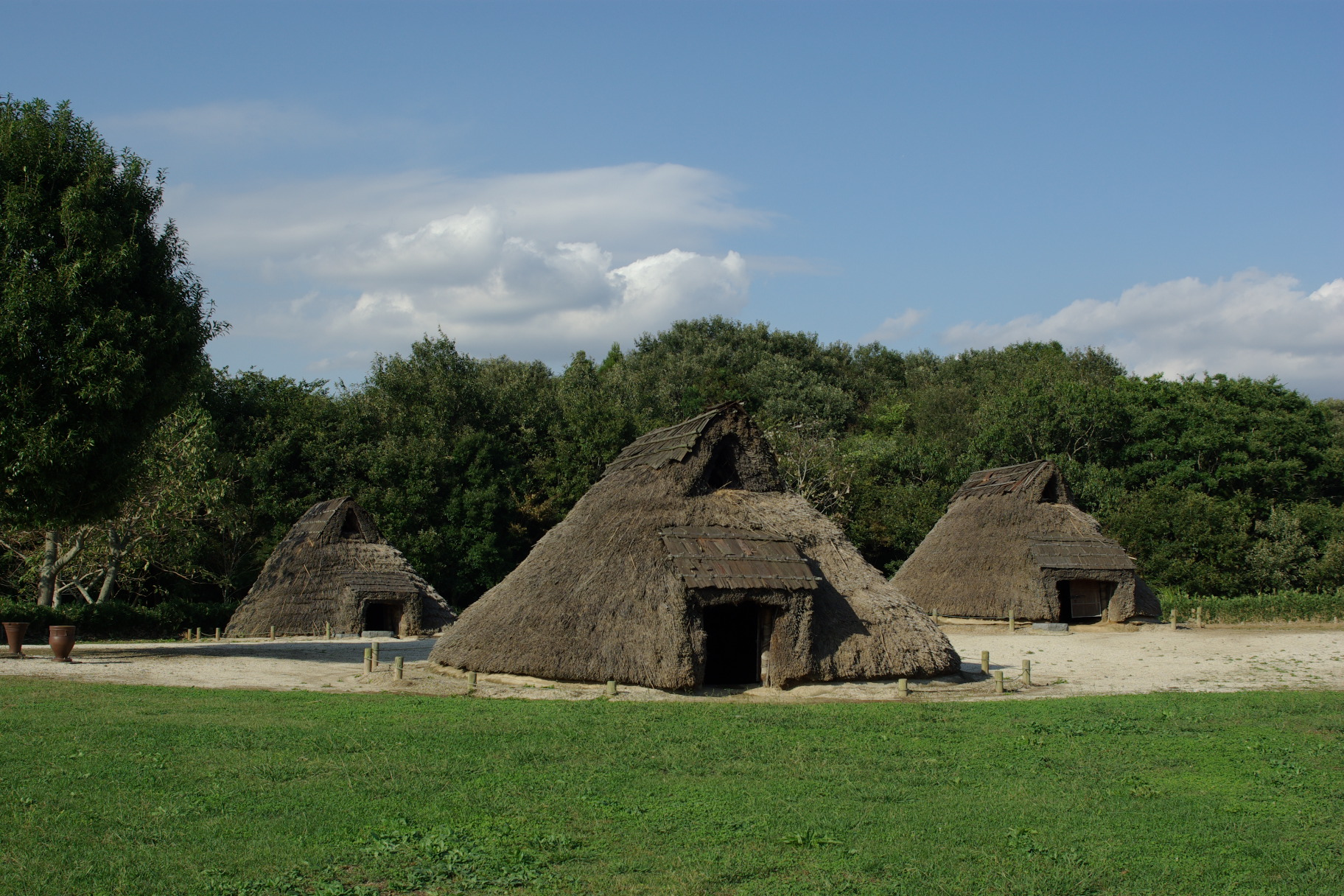
Kamitakatsu Shell Mound in Tsuchiura

=== Paleolithic ===
In the Japanese Paleolithic, humans are believed to have started living in the present-day prefecture area before and after the deposition of the volcanic ash layer from the Aira Caldera about 24,000 years ago. At the bottom of this layer are local tools of polished stone and burnt pebbles.

=== Asuka period ===
During the Asuka period the provinces of Hitachi and Fusa were created. Later Fusa was divided, among them, the Shimōsa Province.

=== Muromachi period ===
At the beginning of the Muromachi period, in the 14th century, Kitabatake Chikafusa made of the Oda Castle his field headquarters for over a year, and wrote the Jinnō Shōtōki (Chronicles of the Authentic Lineages of the Divine Emperors), while he was at castle.

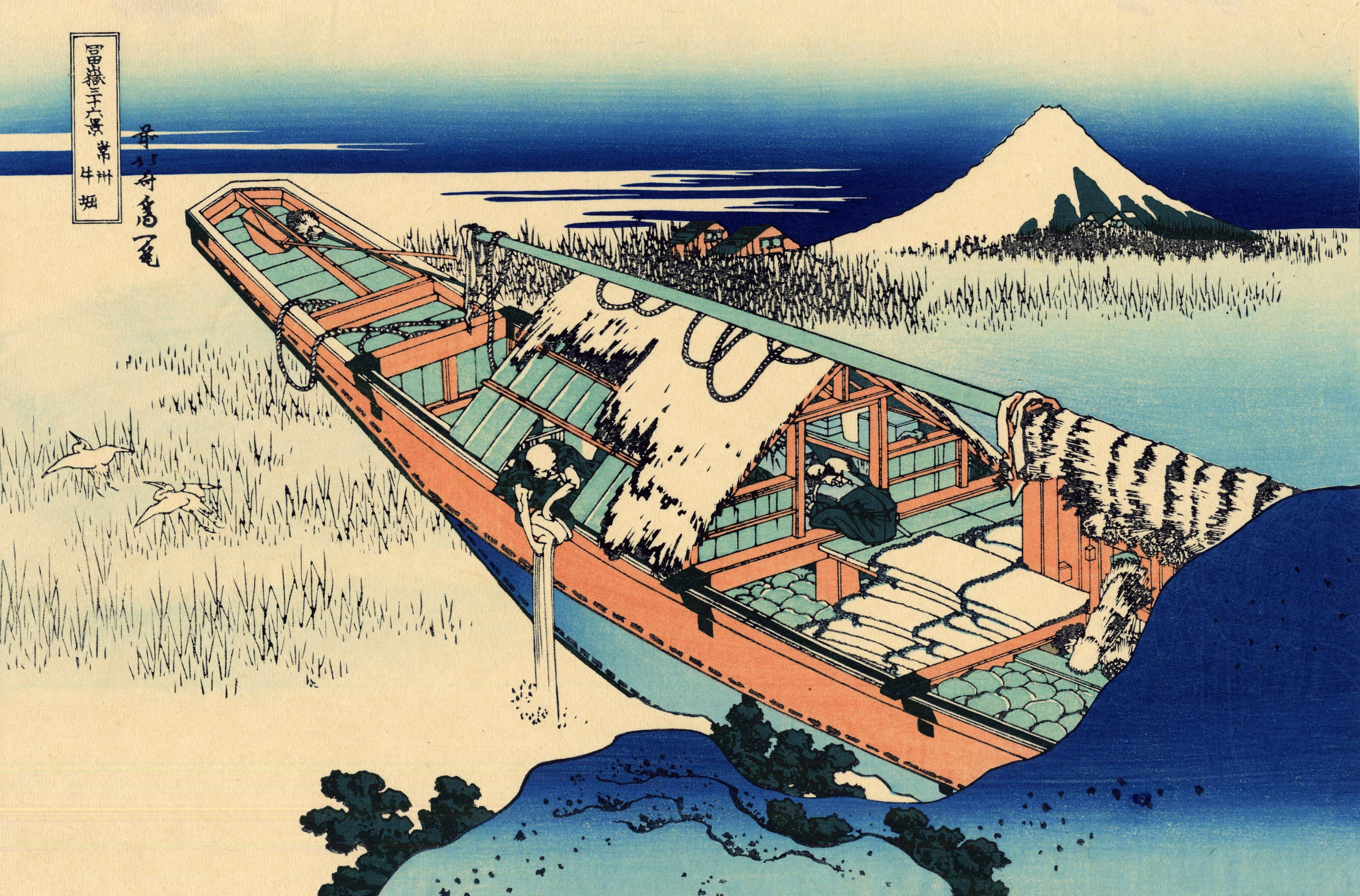
Lake Kasumigaura in Ushibori Village (Hitachi Province), Mount Fuji in the background; 19th century of the Edo period. Hokusai, painter and printmaker

=== Edo period ===
During the Edo period, one of the three houses or clans originating from Tokugawa Ieyasu (Gosanke 御 三家, three houses), settled in the Mito Domain, the clan is known as the Mito Tokugawa family or simply the Mito clan. Mito Domain, was a Japanese domain of the Edo-period Hitachi Province.

In 1657, a Mitogaku was created when Tokugawa Mitsukuni, head of the Mito Domain, commissioned the compilation of the Dai Nihonshi, a book on the history of Japan.

=== Meiji era ===
During the Meiji Restoration, old provinces were converted or merged to create the current prefectures, in this case Ibaraki Prefecture.

== Geography ==
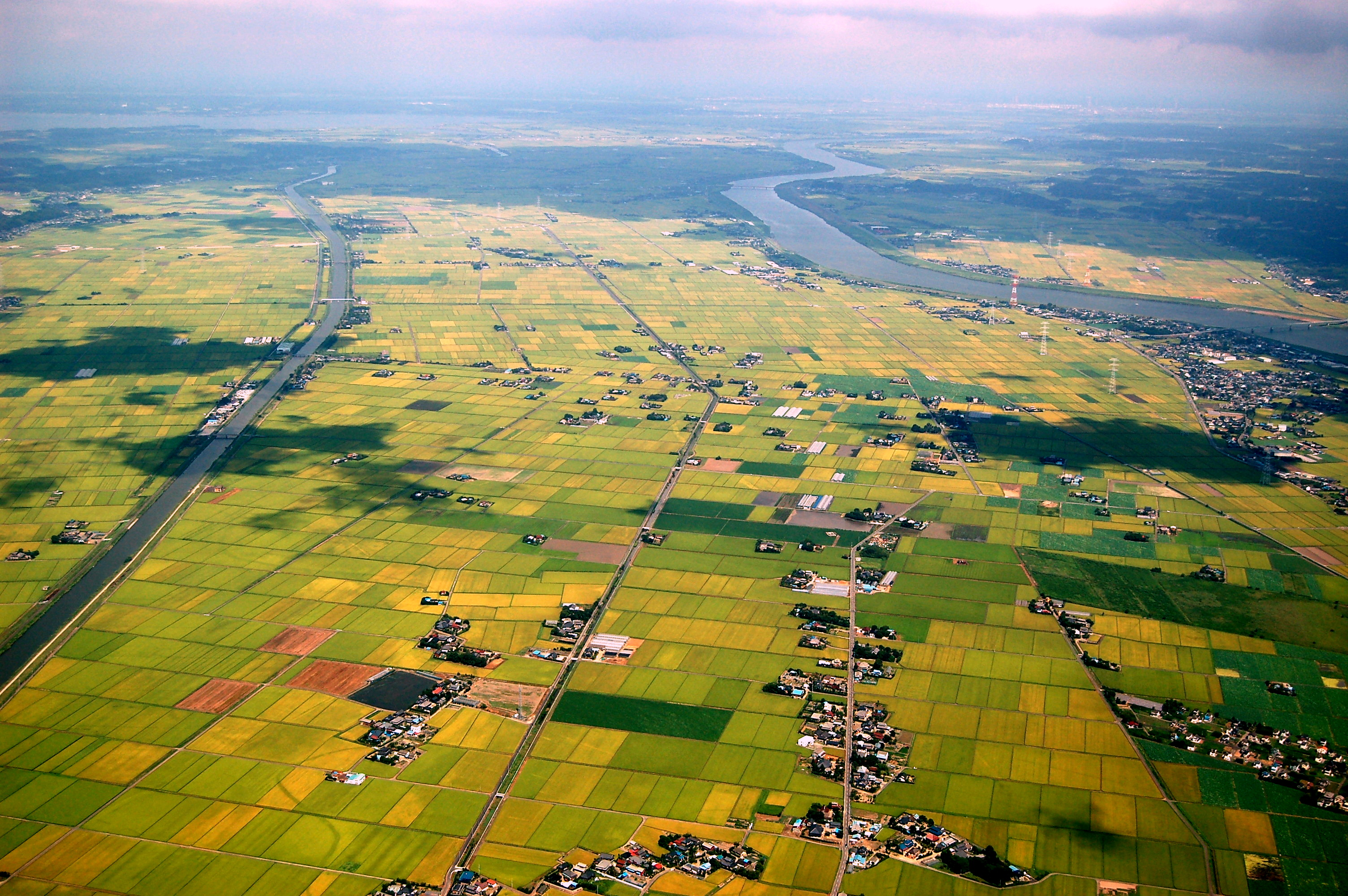
Rivers Shintone (left) and Tone (right), Inashiki and Kawachi areas

Map of Ibaraki Prefecture City Town Village Lake

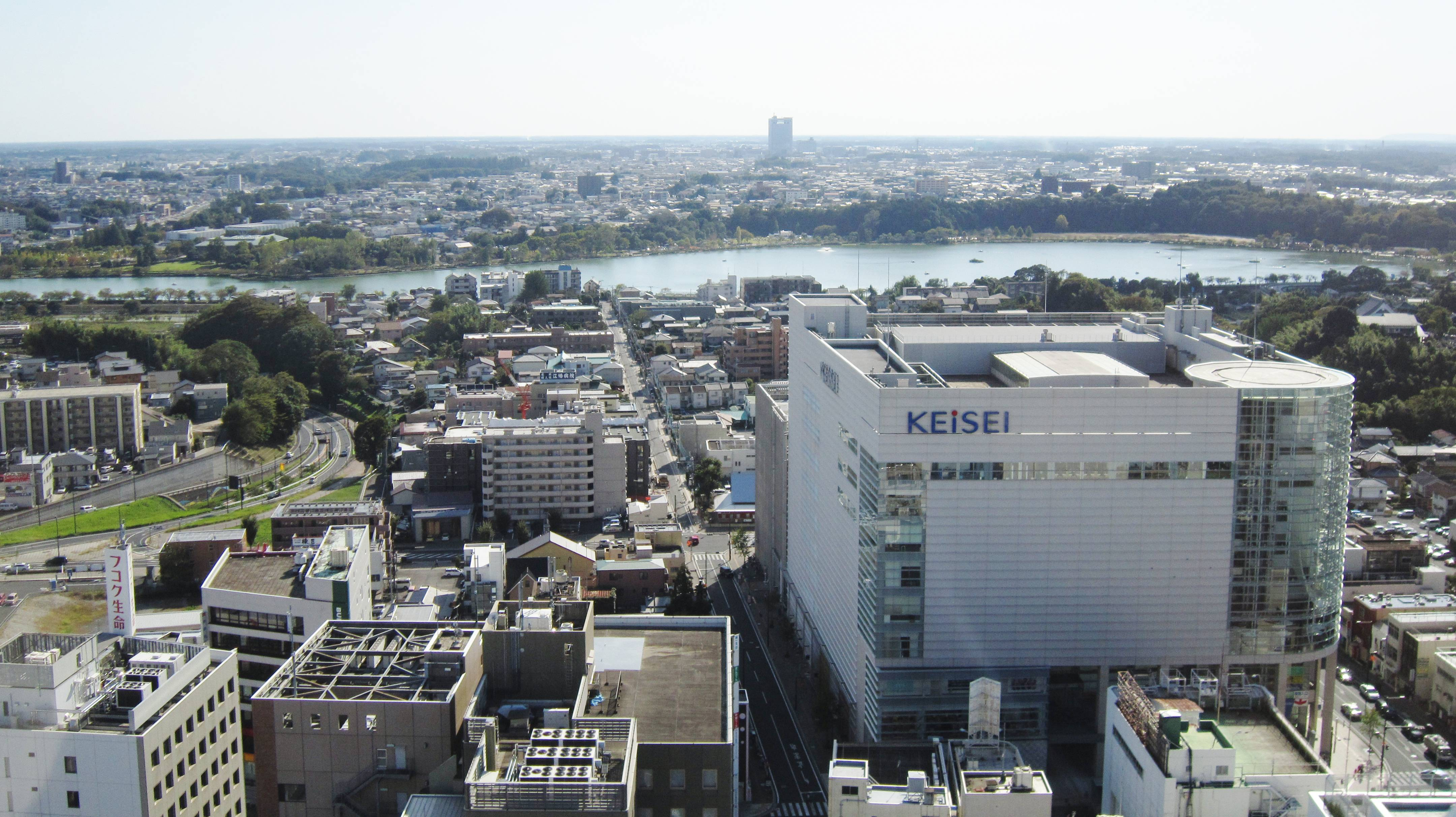
Mito

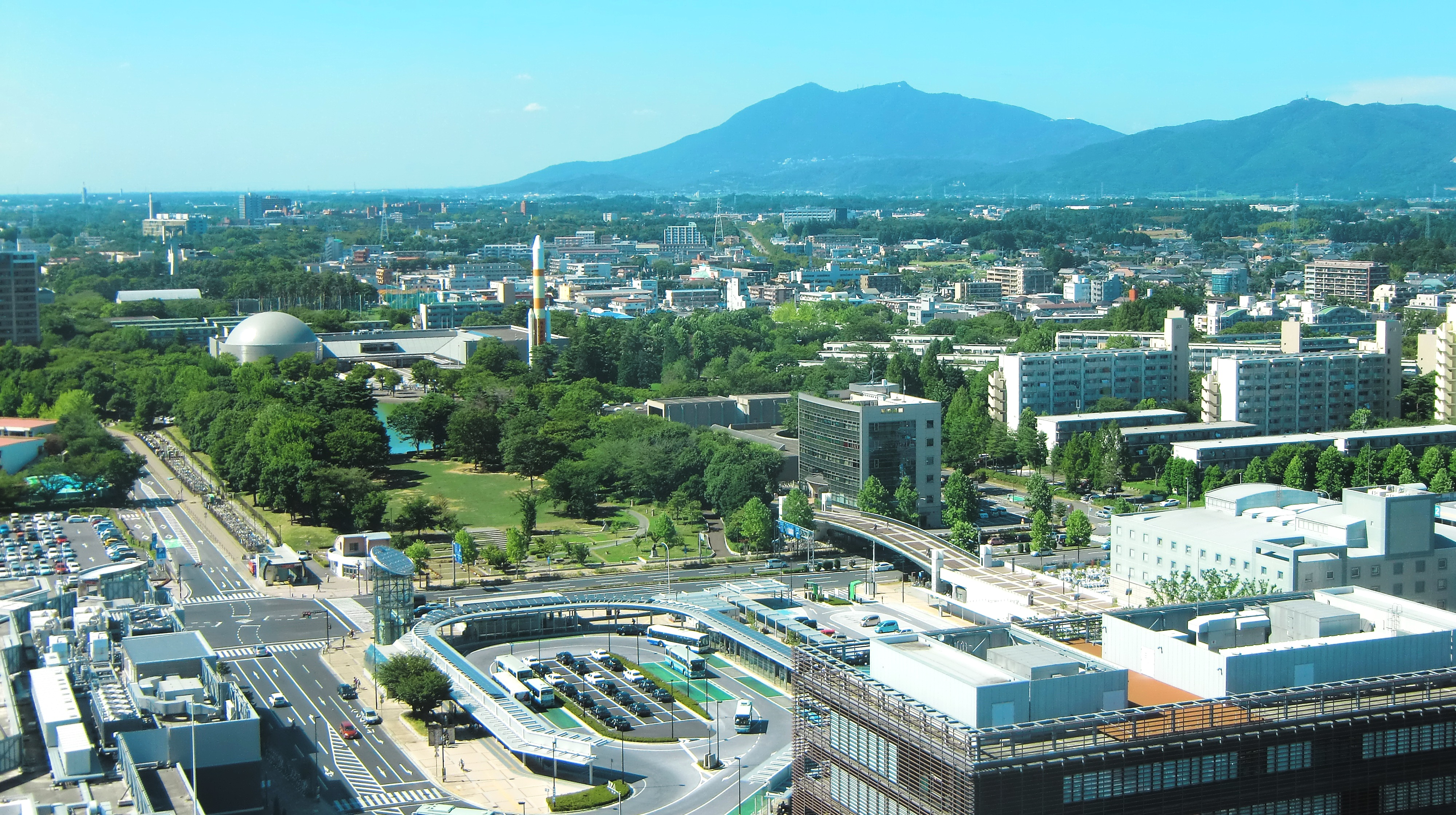
Tsukuba

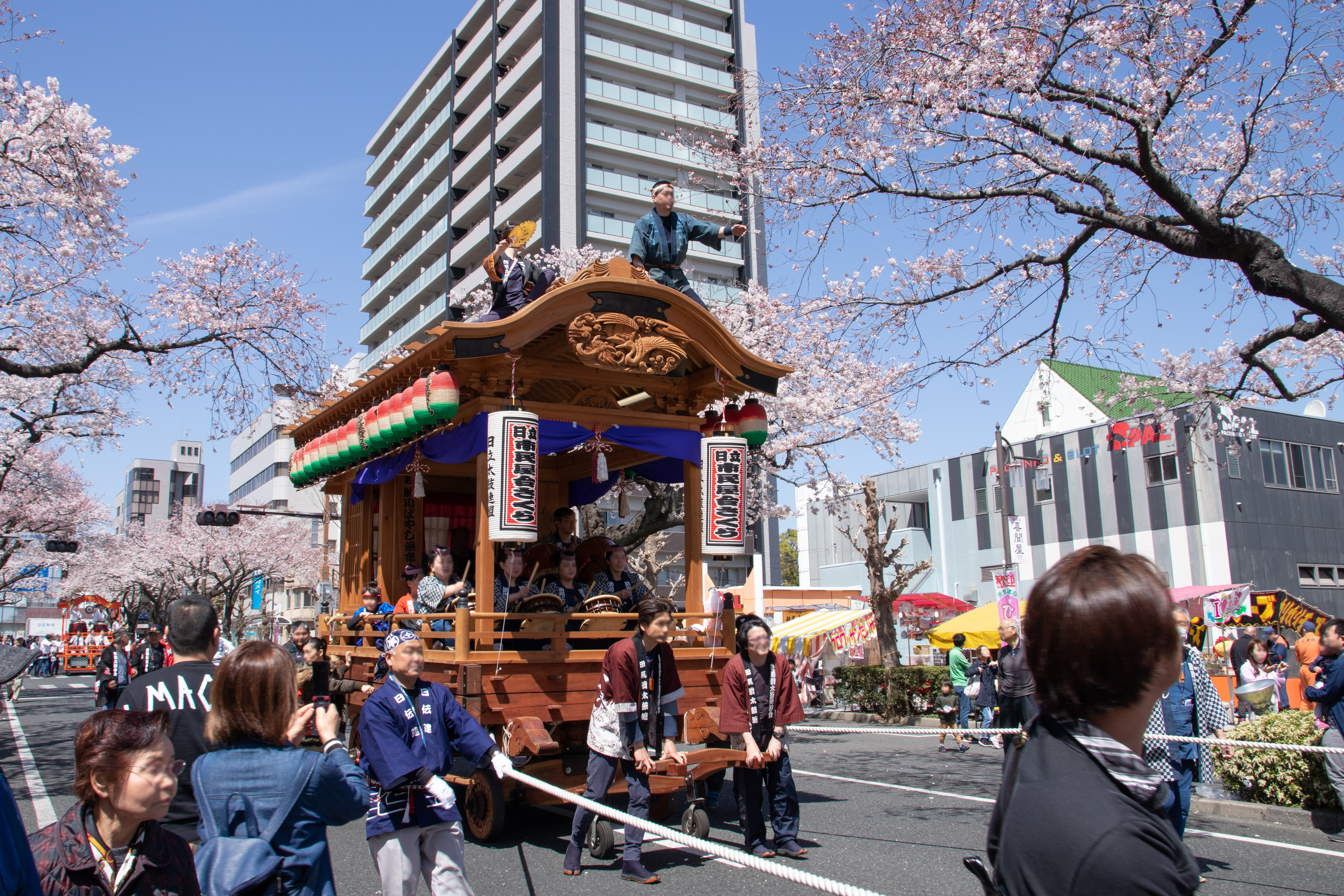
Hitachi Sakura Festival

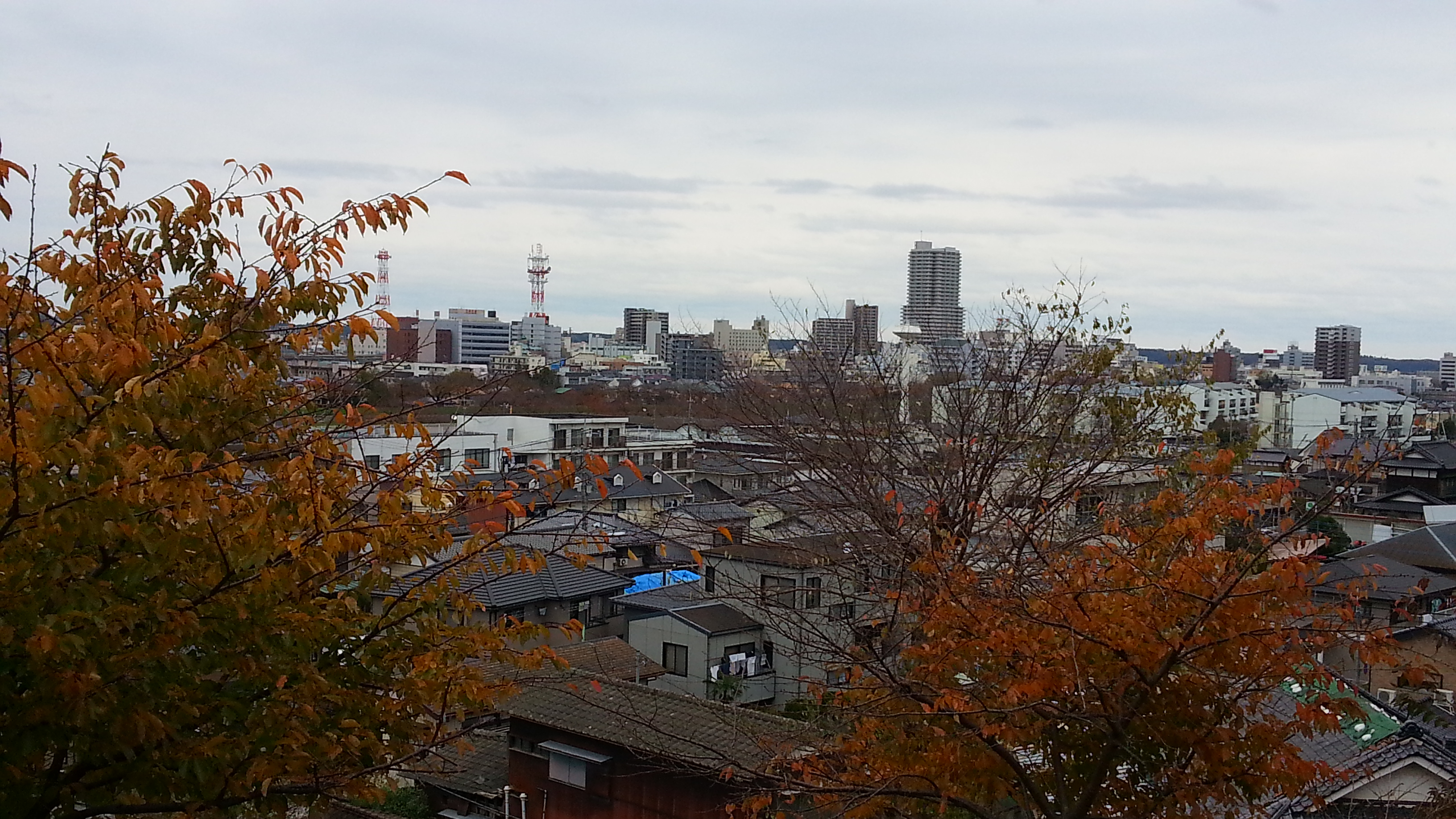
Tsuchiura

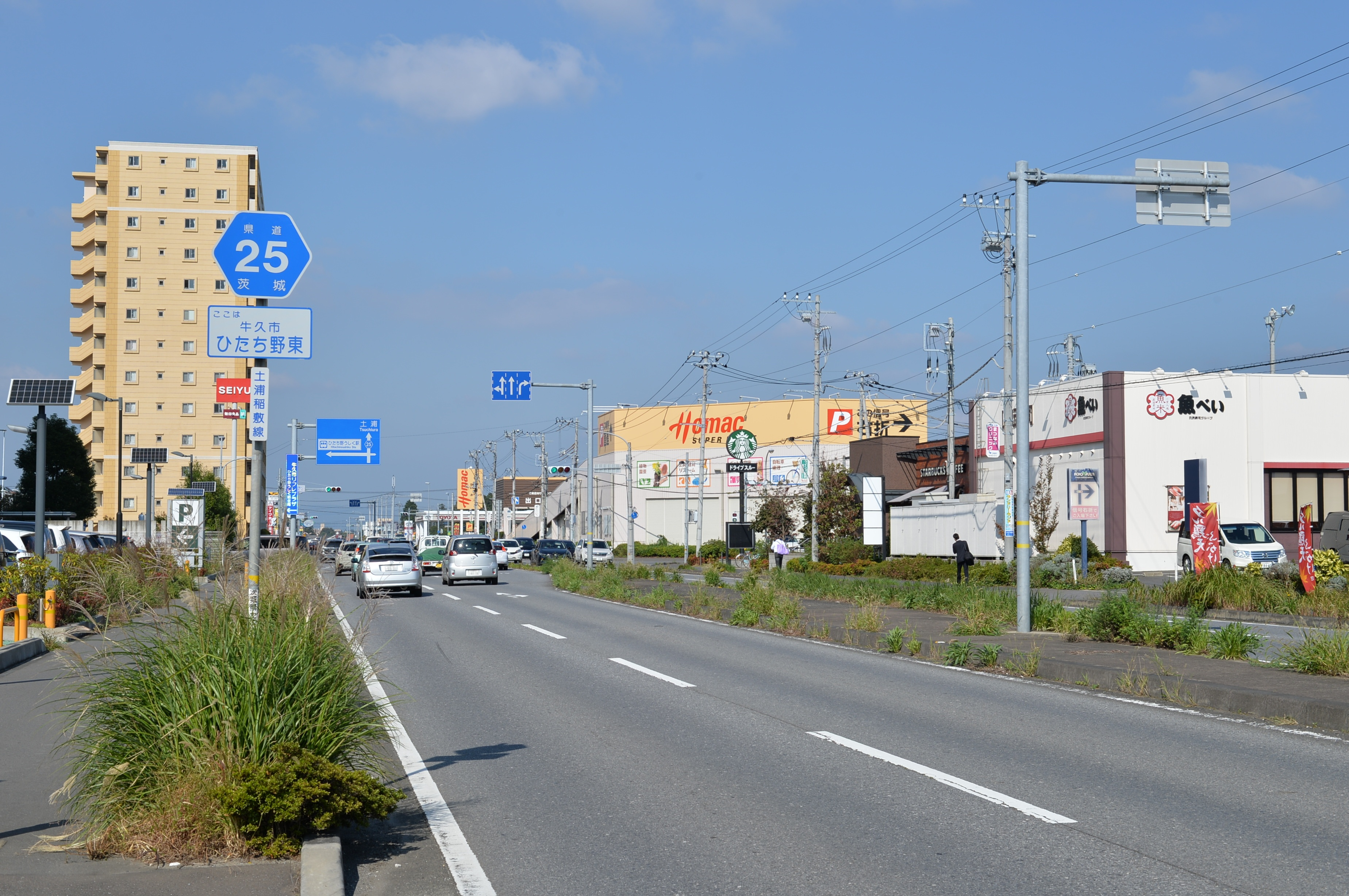
Ushiku

Ibaraki Prefecture is the northeastern part of the Kantō region, stretching between Tochigi Prefecture and the Pacific Ocean and bounded on the north and south by Fukushima Prefecture and Chiba Prefecture. It also has a border on the southwest with Saitama Prefecture. The northernmost part of the prefecture is mountainous, but most of the prefecture is a flat plain with many lakes and is part of Kantō Plain.

=== Natural parks ===
As of 1 April 2012, 15% of the total land area of the prefecture was designated as Natural Parks, namely Suigo-Tsukuba Quasi-National Park, and nine Prefectural Natural Parks. Also, Ibaraki has one Prefectural Geopark. The Suigo-Tsukuba Quasi-National Park, also includes the northeast area of Chiba Prefecture.

=== Mountains ===
The northern third of the prefecture is mountainous and in the center is the Tsukuba Mountains (筑波 山地). Its main mountains are: mount Yamizo with an elevation of 1022 m on the border with Fukushima and Tochigi prefectures (tripoint), mount Takasasa with 922 m, mount Tsukuba with two peaks Nyotai-San at 877 m and Nantai-San at 871 m, mount Osho at 804 m, mount Hanazono at 798 m, and mount Kaba at 709 m.

=== Water system ===
The main rivers that flow through the prefecture include the Tone, Naka (Ibaraki), and Kuji rivers, all of which flow into the Pacific Ocean. Before the seventeenth century, the lower reaches of the Tone were different from its current layout, and the Tone ran south and emptied into Tokyo Bay, and tributaries such as the Watarase and Kinu rivers had independent water systems.

The main tributaries of the Tone River basin are the Kinu River and Kokai River, which flow from north to south in the western part of the prefecture. The Shintone and Sakura rivers flow into Lake Nishiura.

The Edo River flows into Tokyo Bay; its source currently rises as an arm of the Tone River. In the past, the course of the Edo River was different, its source was corrected and diverted to the Tone River in the 17th century by the Tokugawa shogunate to protect the city of Edo (now Tokyo) from flooding.

The Tone River, in addition to the Edo River, is part of the southern border of Ibaraki Prefecture with Chiba Prefecture, and the Watarase River, Tone River, Gongendō River, and Naka River (Saitama) in the southwestern border of Ibaraki with Saitama Prefecture. The Watarase River has become a small boundary of the southern border between Ibaraki and Tochigi prefectures.

From ancient times to the beginning of the Edo period, the lower reaches of the Tone River did not exist and the mouth of the Tone was in Tokyo Bay. On the plain was the Katori Sea, which existed in ancient times, the Lake Kasumigaura and other lagoons in present-day Chiba prefecture are remnants of that sea. Katori Sea was connected to the Kashima-nada (Pacific Ocean).

Lake Kasumigaura is currently divided into three lakes: Nishiura, Kitaura, Sotonasakaura. In addition, in the prefecture there are freshwater lagoons such as Hinuma, Senba, and Ushiku.

Fukuoka Dam, is a dam that spans the Kokai River in Tsukubamirai, it is one of the three largest dams in the Kantō region. Ryūjin Dam in Hitachiōta, is a beautiful dam on the Ryūjin River with a large pedestrian suspension bridge above the dam lake.

=== Cities ===
Thirty-two (32) cities are located in Ibaraki Prefecture:

Name		Area (km^{2})	Population	Map
Rōmaji	Kanji	Area (km^{2})	Population	Map
Bandō	坂東市	123.03	51,577	
Chikusei	筑西市	205.30	98,031	
Hitachi	日立市	225.71	165,822	
Hitachinaka	ひたちなか市	99.96	154,631	
Hitachiōmiya	常陸大宮市	348.45	39,176	
Hitachiōta	常陸太田市	371.99	47,922	
Hokota	鉾田市	207.61	45,886	
Inashiki	稲敷市	205.81	38,353	
Ishioka	石岡市	215.53	70,124	
Itako	潮来市	71.40	27,512	
Jōsō	常総市	123.64	59,314	
Kamisu	神栖市	146.94	95,396	
Kasama	笠間市	240.40	73,664	
Kashima	鹿嶋市	106.02	66,098	
Kasumigaura	かすみがうら市	156.60	40,254	
Kitaibaraki	北茨城市	186.80	41,750	
Koga	古河市	123.58	137,512	
Mito (capital)	水戸市	217.32	268,036	
Moriya	守谷市	35.71	69,827	
Naka	那珂市	97.82	53,137	
Namegata	行方市	222.48	31,960	
Omitama	小美玉市	144.74	48,754	
Ryūgasaki	龍ケ崎市	78.55	75,212	
Sakuragawa	桜川市	180.06	38,905	
Shimotsuma	下妻市	80.88	41,621	
Takahagi	高萩市	193.58	27,522	
Toride	取手市	69.94	103,717	
Tsuchiura	土浦市	122.89	142,181	
Tsukuba	つくば市	283.72	256,526	
Tsukubamirai	つくばみらい市	79.16	51,035	
Ushiku	牛久市	58.92	83,826	
Yūki	結城市	65.76	49,252	

=== Towns and villages ===
These are the towns and villages in each district, 10 towns and 2 villages in 7 districts:

Name		Area (km^{2})	Population	District	Map
Rōmaji	Kanji	Area (km^{2})	Population	District	Map
Ami	阿見町	71.40	47,927	Inashiki District	
Daigo	大子町	325.76	15,725	Kuji District	
Goka	五霞町	23.11	8,162	Sashima District	
Ibaraki	茨城町	121.58	31,412	Higashiibaraki District	
Kawachi	河内町	44.30	8,298	Inashiki District	
Miho	美浦村	66.61	14,504	Inashiki District	
Ōarai	大洗町	23.74	15,787	Higashiibaraki District	
Sakai	境町	46.59	24,061	Sashima District	
Shirosato	城里町	161.80	18,044	Higashiibaraki District	
Tōkai	東海村	37.98	37,641	Naka District	
Tone	利根町	24.90	15,073	Kitasōma District	
Yachiyo	八千代町	58.99	20,882	Yūki District	

== Economy ==
Ibaraki's economy is based on energy production (particularly nuclear energy), chemical and precision machining industries, research institutes, and tourism. Agriculture, fishing, and livestock are also important sectors in the prefecture.

Ibaraki's vast flat terrain make it highly suitable for industrial development. This complements its proximity to the Tokyo metropolitan area, giving it a high reputation as an industrial base. The prefecture is also home to Tsukuba, Japan's most extensive research and academic city, and the birthplace of Hitachi, Ltd.

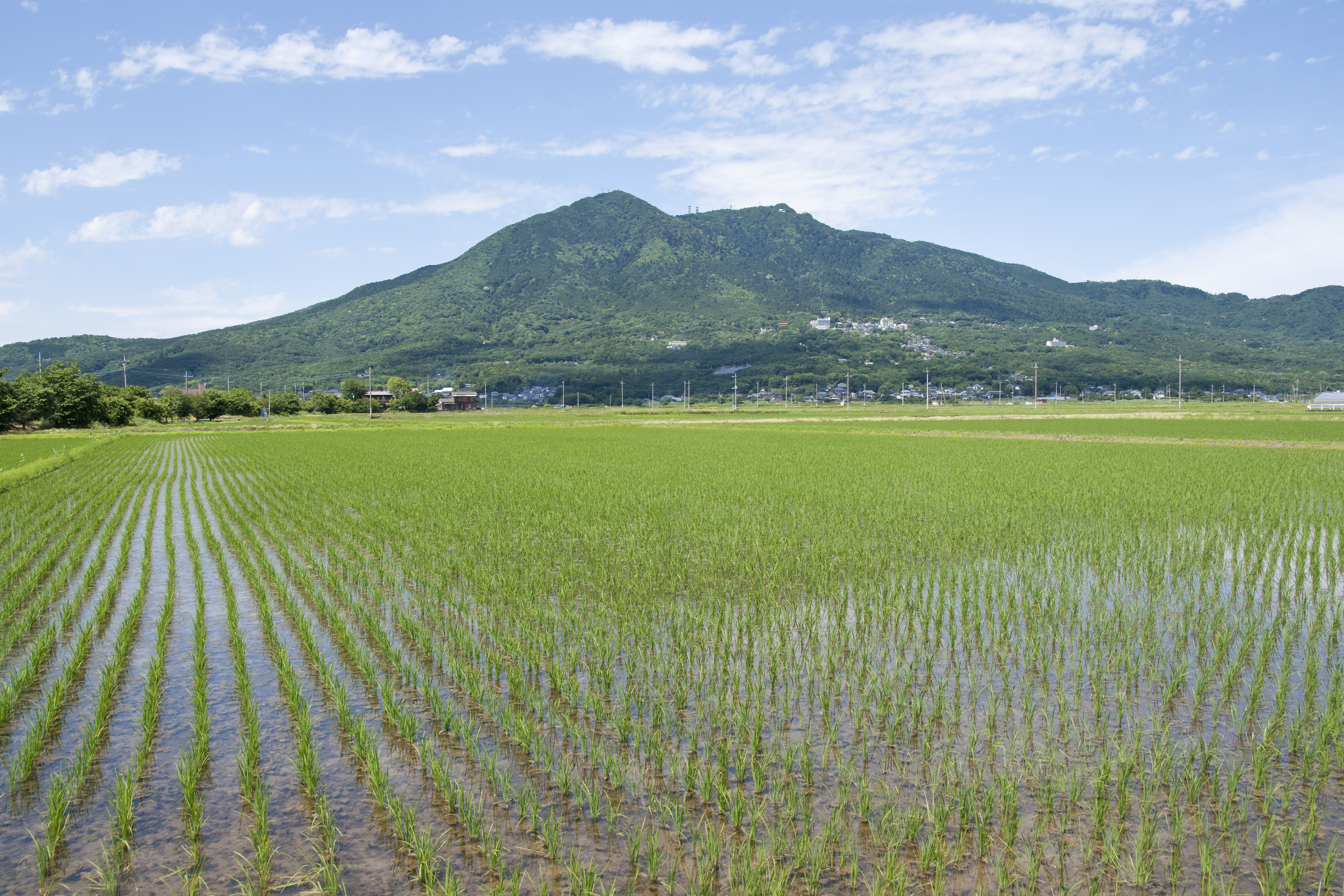
Paddy field at the foot of Mt. Tsukuba

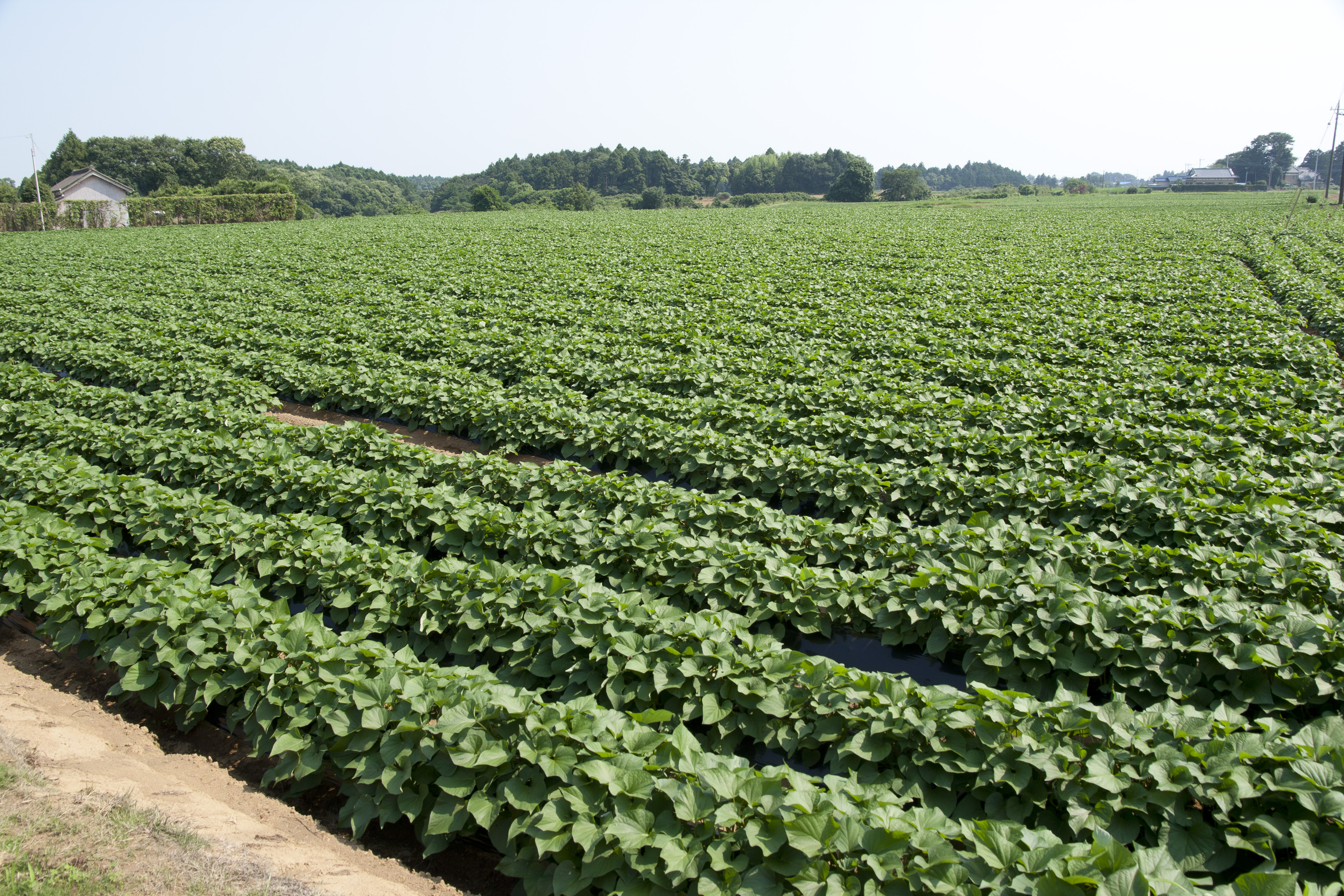
Sweet potato field in Namegata

=== Agriculture ===
With extensive flat lands, abundant water, and suitable climate, Ibaraki is among the prefectures with the highest agricultural production in Japan. It plays an important role in supplying food to the Tokyo metropolitan area. Its main products include melons, pears, peppers, various varieties of rice and sugar cane, as well as flowers and ornamental plants.

It also supplies other food crops to the rest of the country. As of March 2011, the prefecture produced 25% of Japan's bell peppers and Chinese cabbage.

=== Fishing ===
It is one of the prefectures with the highest fish production in the country; in the Pacific Ocean, Lake Kasumigaura, other lagoons and rivers, various species of fish are obtained.

=== Cattle ===
The Hitachigyū cattle (常 陸 牛 - ひたちぎゅう - Hitachi-gyū, Hitachi-ushi), which is a prefectural bovine breed, is noteworthy in livestock. The name comes from the kanji 常 陸 (Hitachi), the name of the ancient Hitachi Province and 牛 (ushi or gyū, beef).

Background. In 1833 Tokugawa Nariaki (徳川 斉昭) established the breeding of black cattle in the present Migawa-chō (見川 町) of the city of Mito. Originally it remained mainly in the northern part of the prefecture, but later it spread throughout the prefecture.

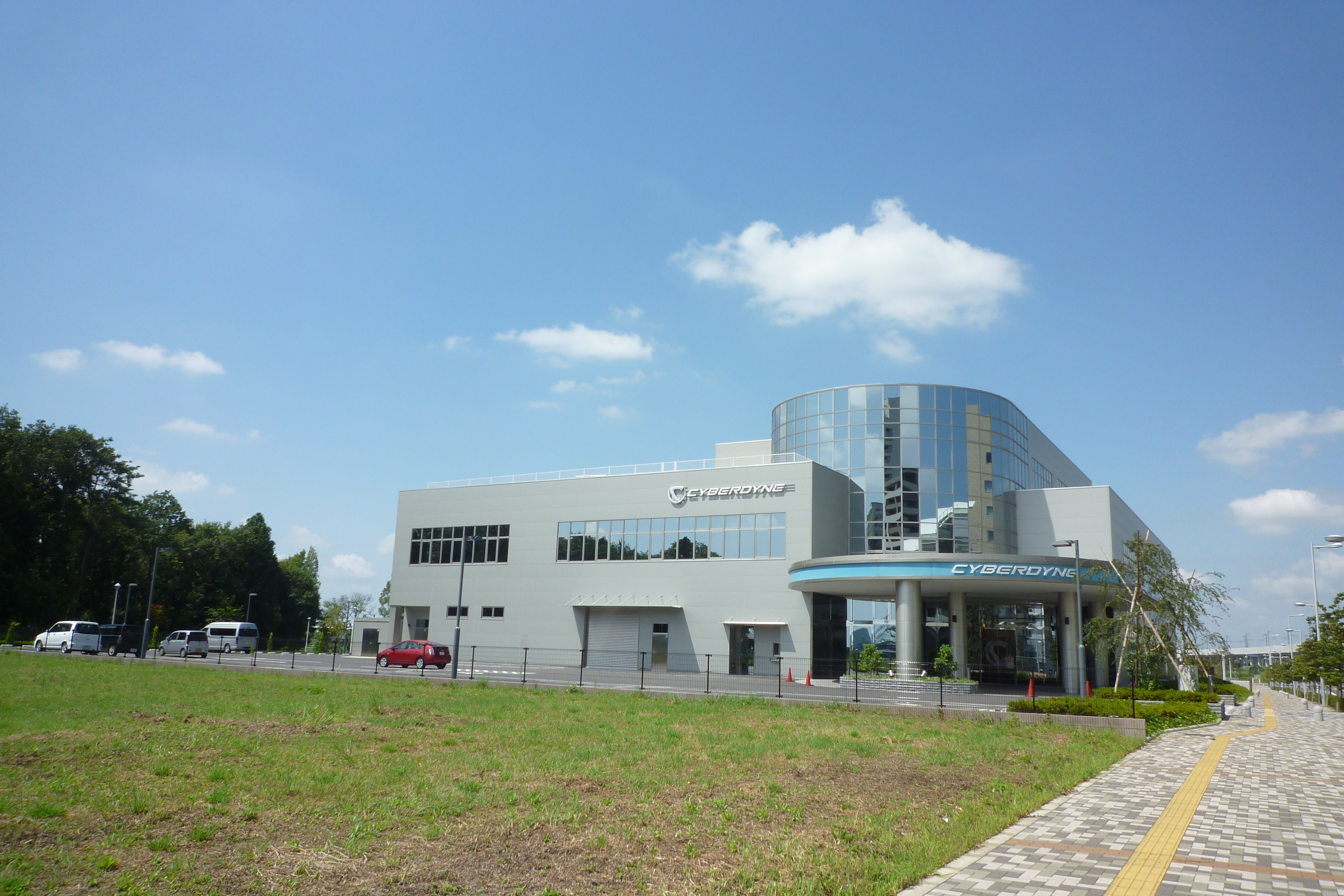
Cyberdyne Inc. in Tsukuba

=== Industrial centers ===
- Hitachi area. Grouping of industries, such as electrical, electronic and machinery. More than 1,300 companies; many of them hired by the Hitachi company, which was founded in Sukegawa (Hitachi City) in 1910.
- Tōkai area. Atomic Energy Research Organization Grouping. J-PARC, Proton Accelerator Research Complex.
- Tsukuba area. 32 institutes for education and research. Manipulation of matter at the level of atoms (nanotechnology). Robotic security center for support in daily life. Space center.
- Kashima area. Grouping of materials industries, such as steel and petrochemicals, around 160 companies.

== Demographics ==
Ibaraki prefecture population pyramid in 2020

Historical population
Year	Pop.	±% p.a.
1890	1,025,497	—
1903	1,200,475	+1.22%
1913	1,328,329	+1.02%
1920	1,350,400	+0.24%
1925	1,409,092	+0.85%
1930	1,487,097	+1.08%
1935	1,548,991	+0.82%
1940	1,620,000	+0.90%
1945	1,944,344	+3.72%
1950	2,039,418	+0.96%
1955	2,064,037	+0.24%
1960	2,047,024	−0.17%
1965	2,056,154	+0.09%
1970	2,143,551	+0.84%
1975	2,342,198	+1.79%
1980	2,558,007	+1.78%
1985	2,725,005	+1.27%
1990	2,845,382	+0.87%
1995	2,955,530	+0.76%
2000	2,985,676	+0.20%
2005	2,975,167	−0.07%
2010	2,969,770	−0.04%
2015	2,917,857	−0.35%
2020	2,854,131	−0.44%
2025	2,791,231	−0.44%

== Culture ==
Ibaraki is known for nattō, or fermented soybeans, in Mito, watermelons in Kyōwa (recently merged into Chikusei), and chestnuts in the Nishiibaraki region.

Ibaraki is famous for the martial art of Aikido founded by Morihei Ueshiba, also known as Osensei. Ueshiba spent the latter part of his life in the town of Iwama, now part of Kasama, and the Aiki Shrine and dojo he created still remain.

Kasama is famous for Shinto (Kasama Inari Shrine), Ibaraki Ceramic Art Museum, house museum of the calligrapher and ceramist Kitaōji Rosanjin, Kasama Nichidō Museum of Art, residence of Morihei Ueshiba, founder of the martial art Aikidō.

The capital Mito is home to Kairakuen, one of Japan's three most celebrated gardens, and famous for its over 3,000 Japanese plum trees of over 100 varieties.

Kashima Shrine (Jingū) Ibaraki's cultural heritage.

Mito Tōshō-gū, is the memorial shrine of Tokugawa Ieyasu in Mito.

Seizansō was the retirement villa of Tokugawa Mitsukuni.

Mito Municipal Botanical Park, is a botanical garden in Mito.

Park Ibaraki Nature Museum in Bandō.

There are castle ruins in many cities, including Mito Castle, Yūki Castle, Kasama Castle, Tsuchiura Castle, Oda Castle.

Hitachi Fūryūmono, a puppet float theater festival, Intangible Cultural Heritage of Humanity.

Makabe Hina Doll Festival - Hinamatsuri - (Sakuragawa City).

Yūki-tsumugi (silk weaving technique) Intangible Cultural Heritage of Humanity, Kasama ware, Makabe Stone Lamp, Kagami Crystal Glass Factory, old glass factory in Ryūgasaki City.

== Education ==
=== University ===
- Ami
  - Ibaraki Prefectural University of Health Sciences
- Hitachi
  - Ibaraki Christian University

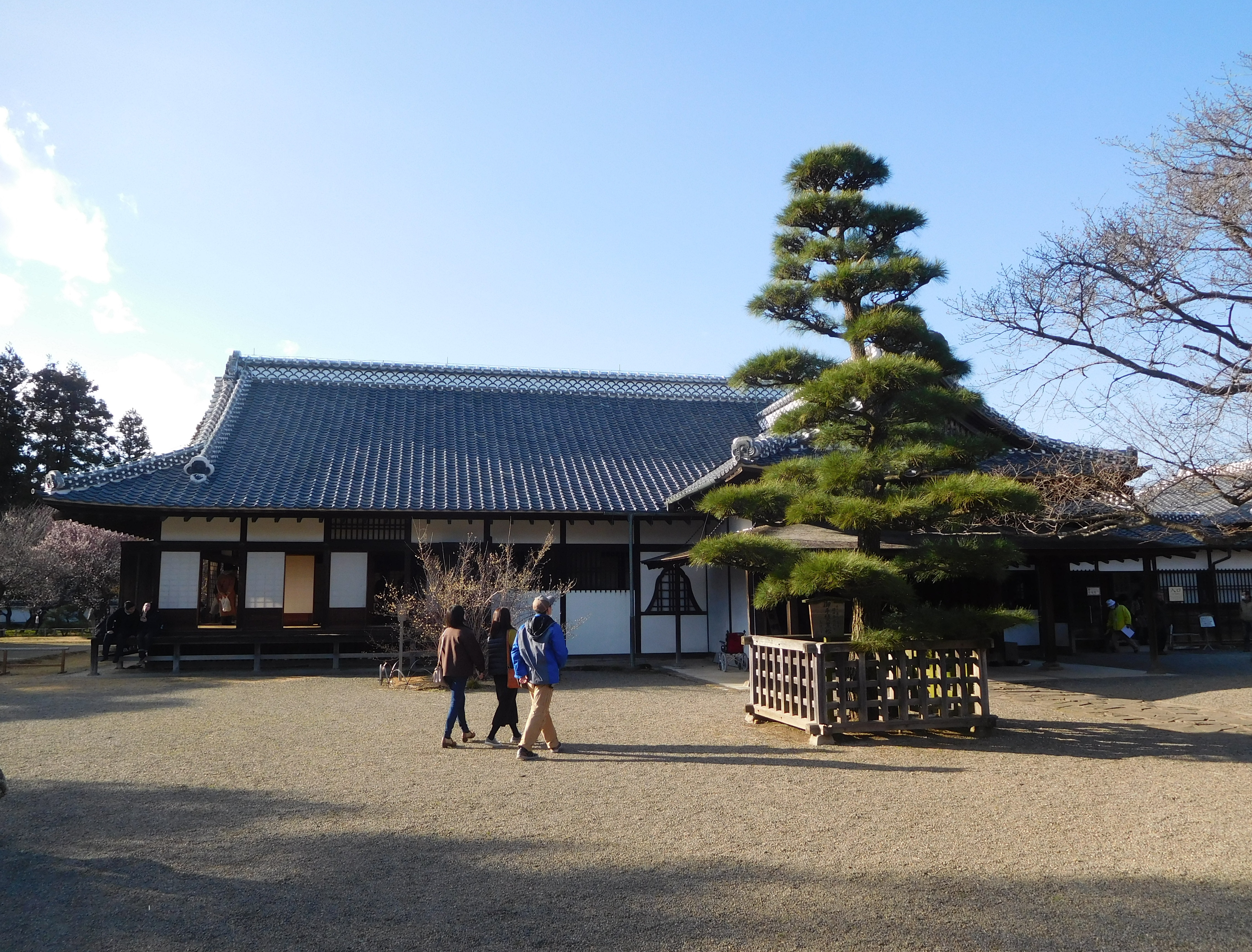
Kōdōkan (Mito)

- Mito
  - Ibaraki University
  - Tokiwa University
- Ryūgasaki
  - Ryūtsū Keizai University
- Toride
  - Tokyo University of the Arts
- Tsuchiura
  - Tsukuba International University
- Tsukuba
  - Tsukuba Gakuin University
  - Tsukuba University
  - Tsukuba University of Technology

== Sports ==
The sports teams listed below are based in Ibaraki.

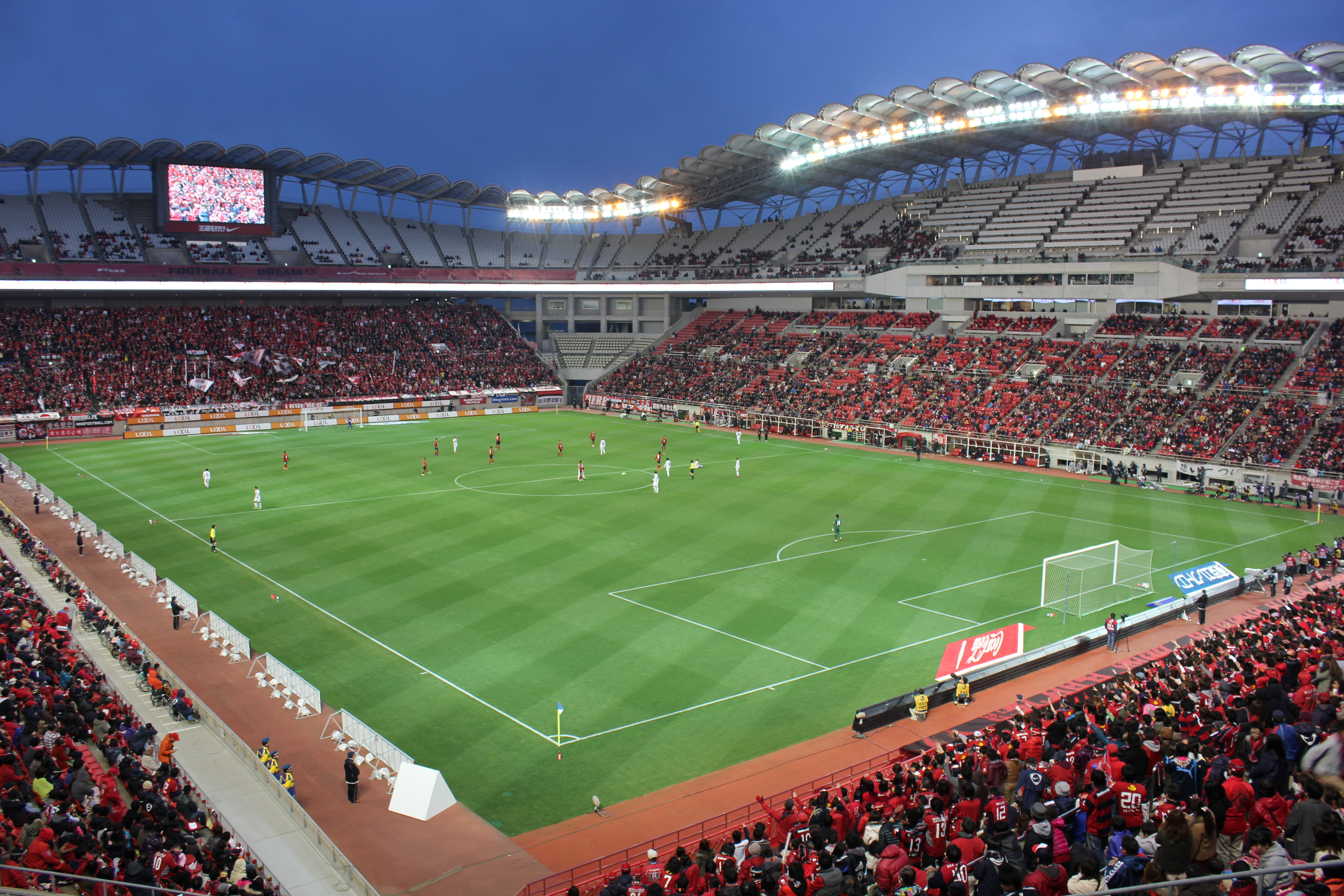
Kashima Soccer Stadium

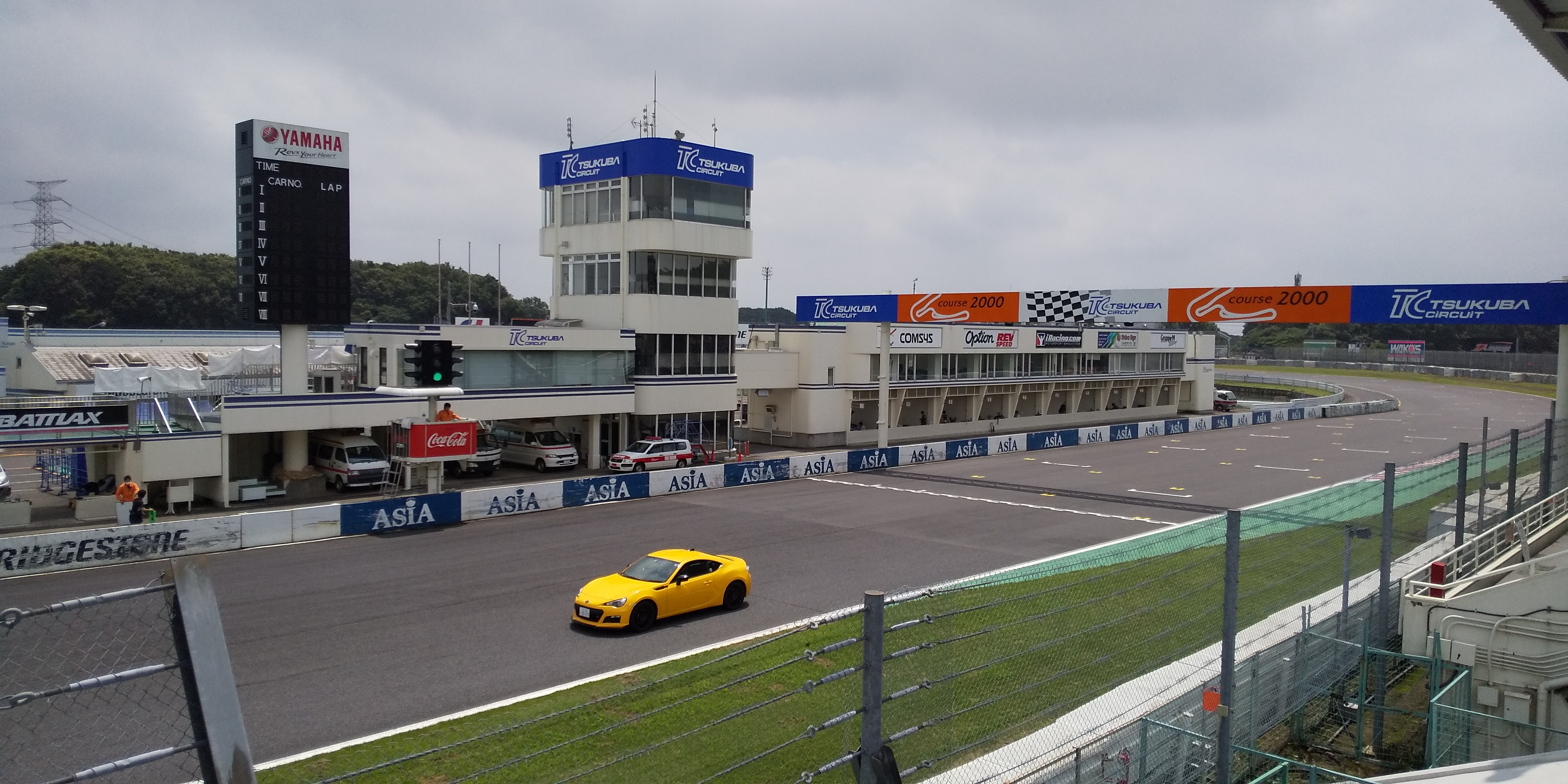
Tsukuba Circuit

=== Association football ===
- Kashima Antlers (Kashima)
- Mito HollyHock (Mito)
- Tsukuba FC (Tsukuba)

=== Volleyball ===
- Hitachi Rivale (Women's) (Hitachinaka)

=== Rugby ===
- Stags - Kashima Rugby Football Club RFC (Kashima)

=== American football ===
- Tsukuba University (Tsukuba)

=== Baseball ===
- Ibaraki Astro Planets (Yūki) (Baseball Challenge League)
- Ibaraki Golden Golds (Regional club) (Tsukuba)

=== Wrestling ===
- Hitachi Pro Wrestling (Regional group) (Hitachi)

=== Basketball ===
- Ibaraki Robots (Mito)

=== Motorsport ===
- Tsukuba Circuit (Shimotsuma)

== Tourism ==
- Fukuroda Falls
- Hitachi Seaside Park
- Ibaraki Prefectural Museum of History
- Kairaku-en (garden)
- Kashima Shrine
- Lake Kasumigaura
- Mount Tsukuba
- Ōarai Aquarium
- Tsukuba Science City
- Ushiku Daibutsu

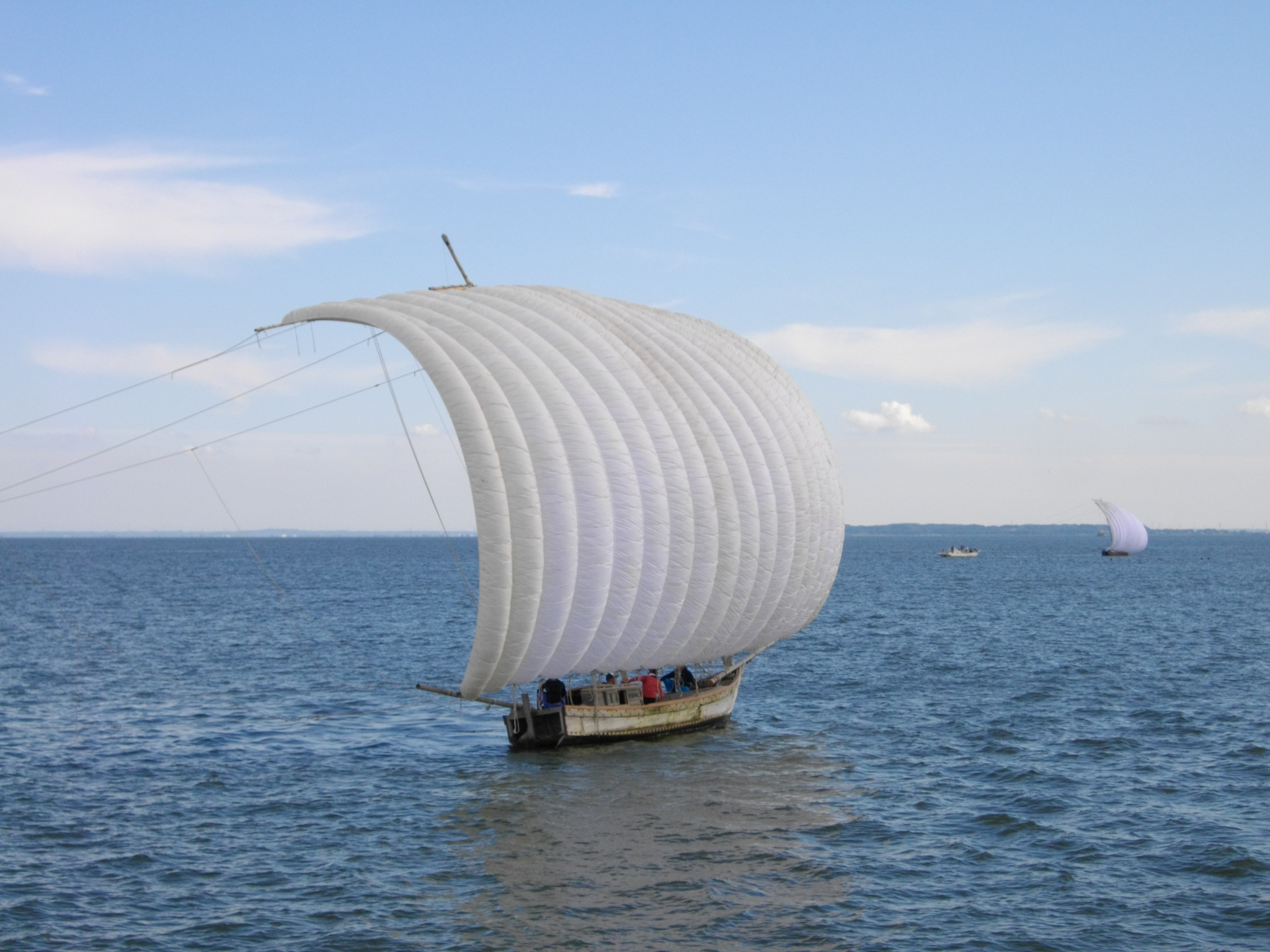
Hobikibune (Sailboat) on Lake Kasumigaura

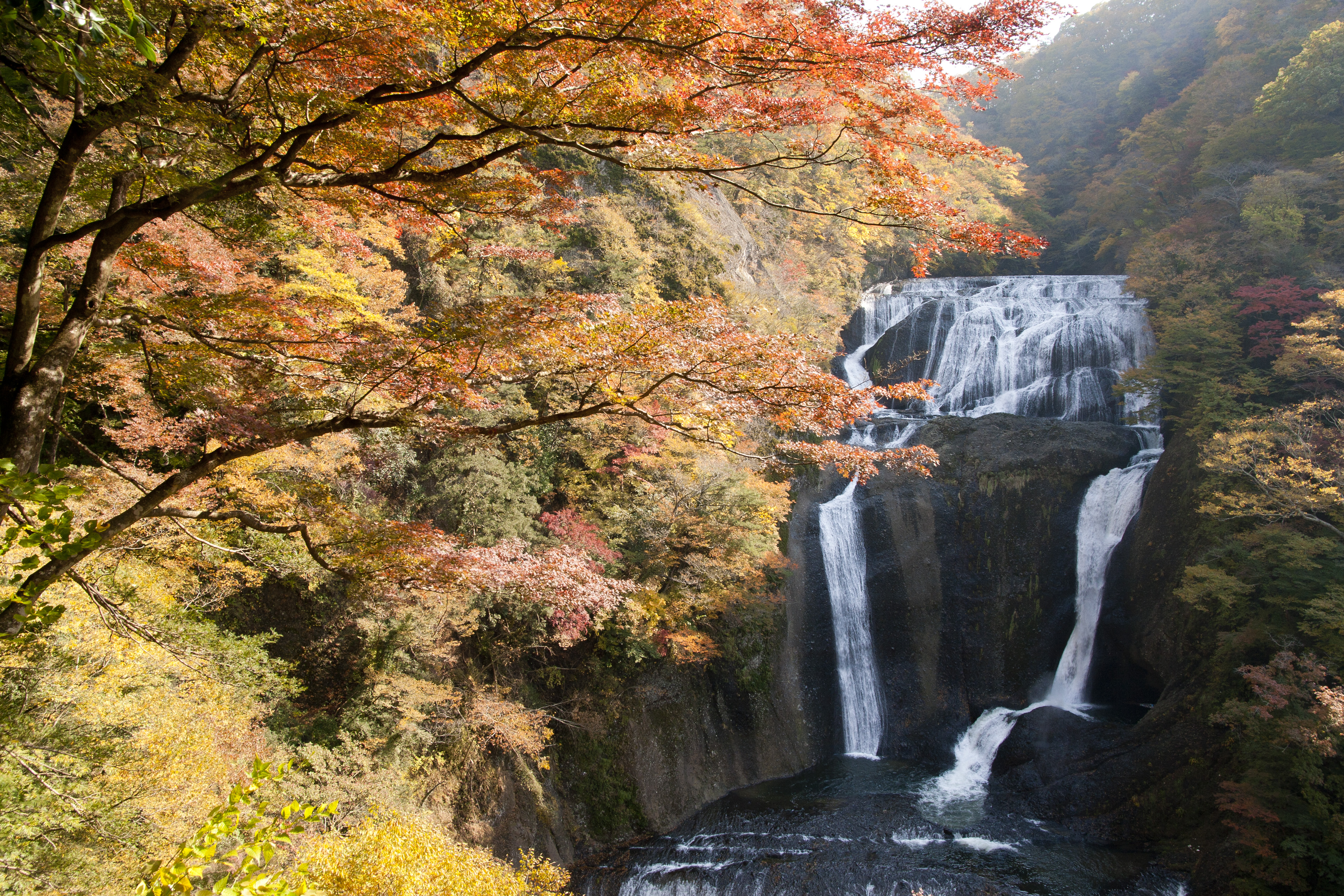
Fukuroda Falls in Daigo

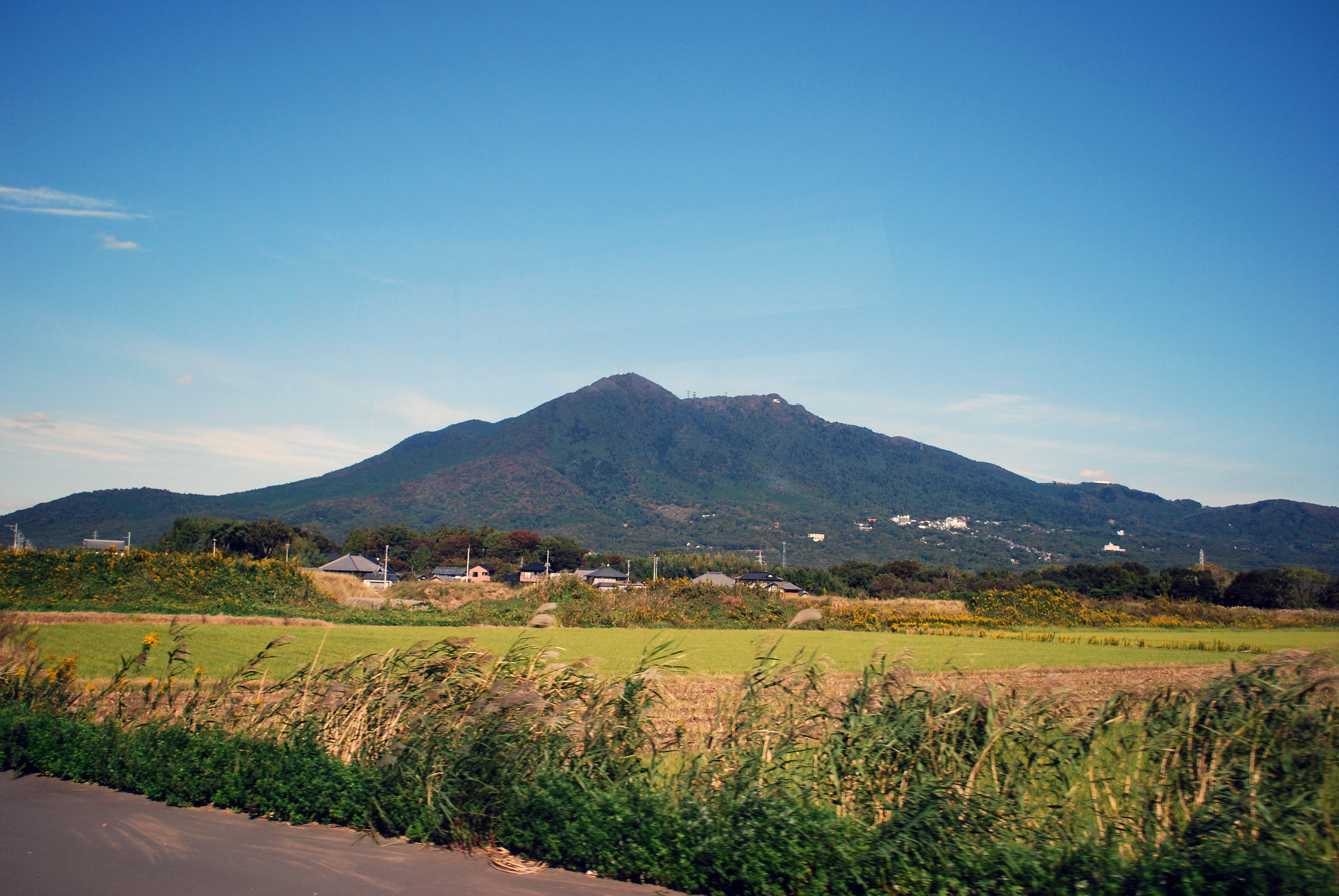
A view of Mount Tsukuba, from Tsukuba City

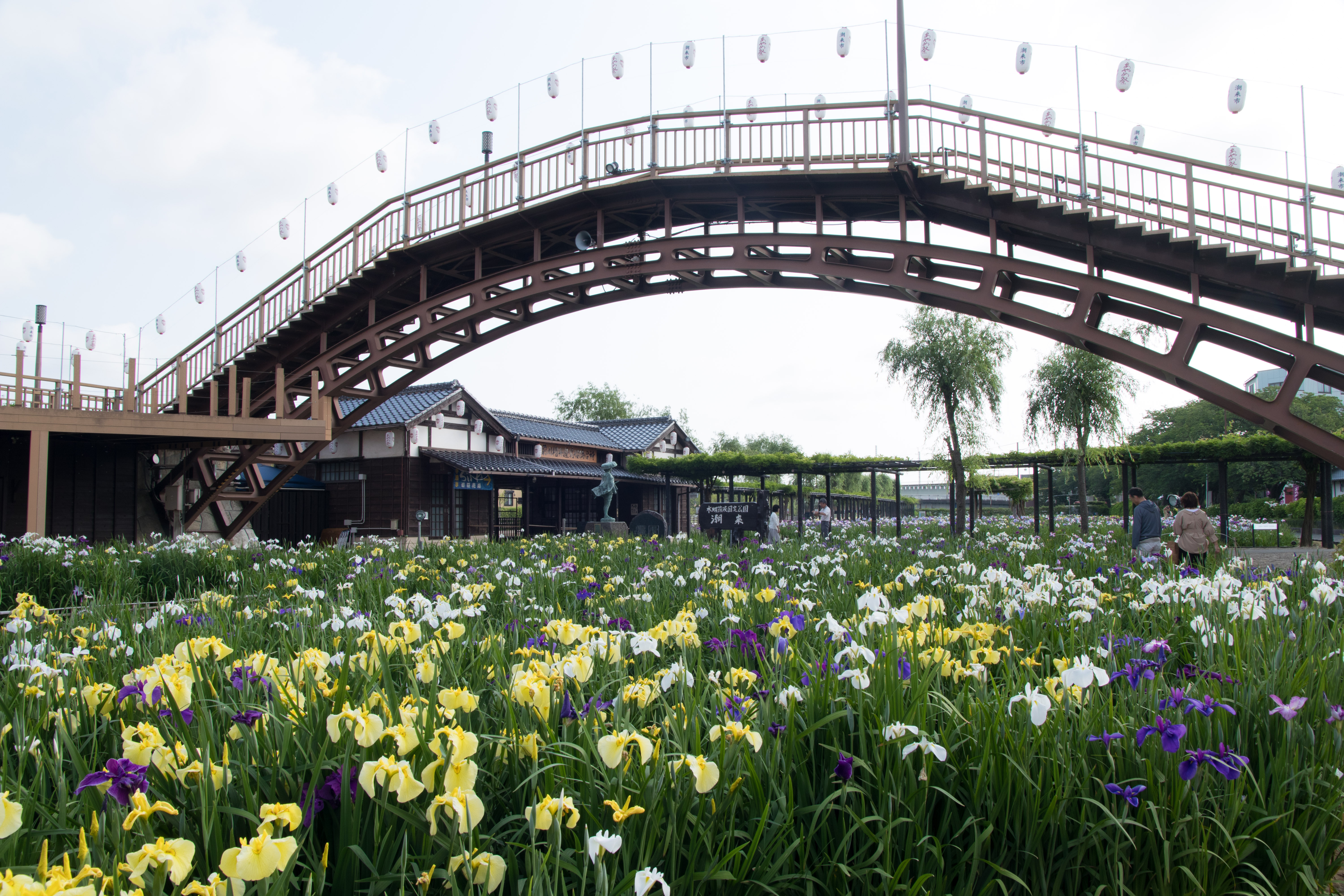
A view of Suigō Itako Iris Garden

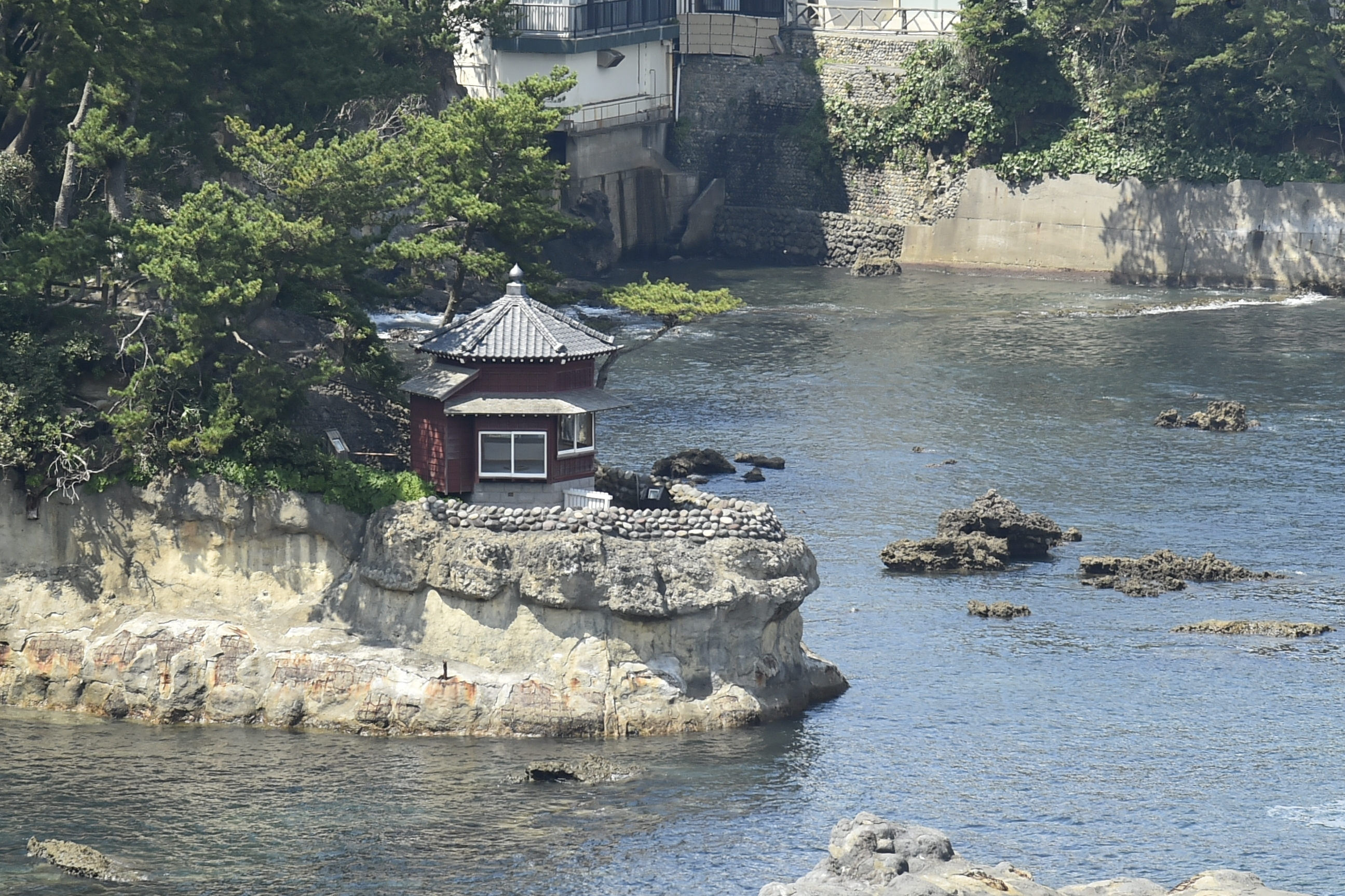
A view of Rokkakudō and Pacific Ocean in Kitaibaraki

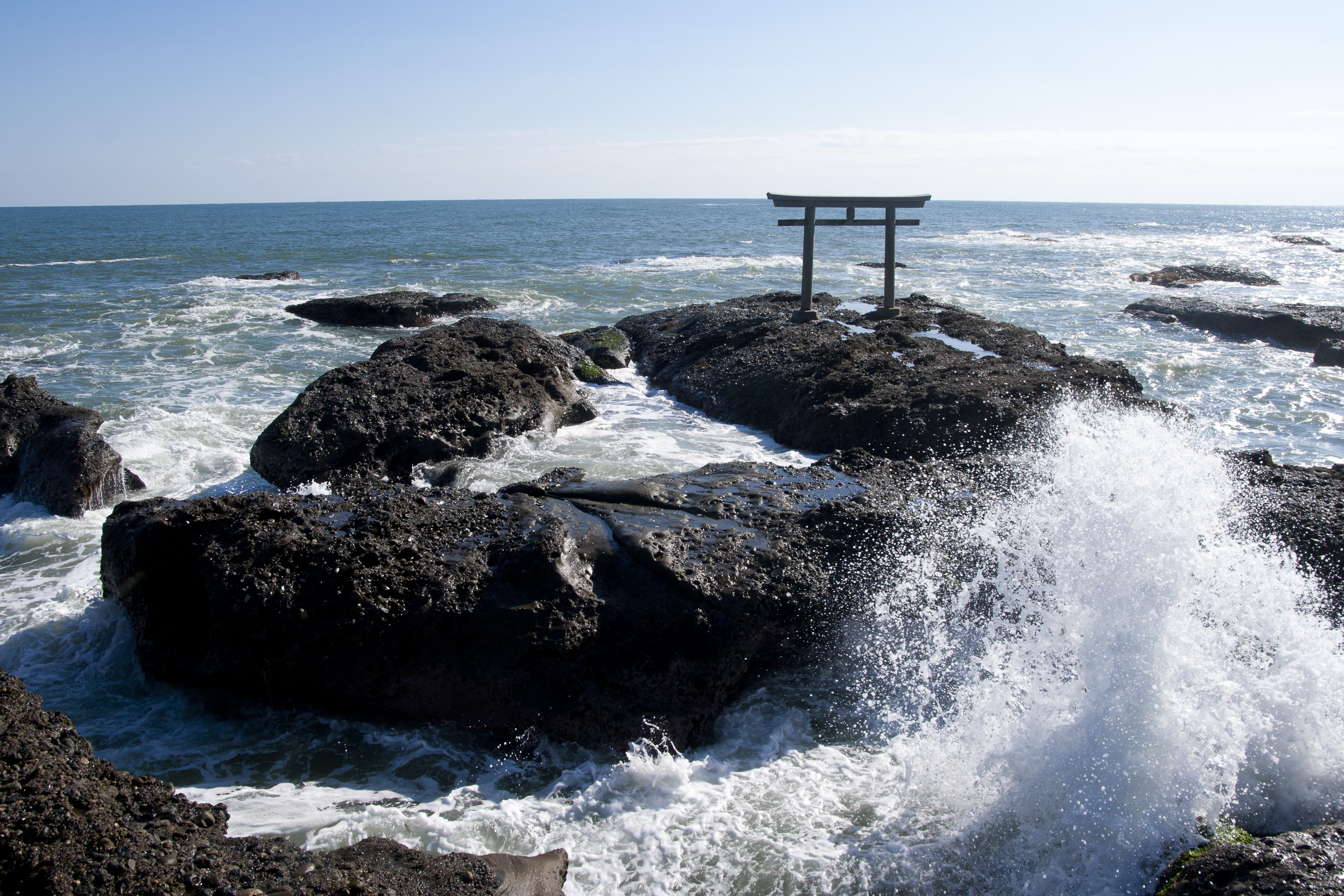
Torii of Ōarai Coast

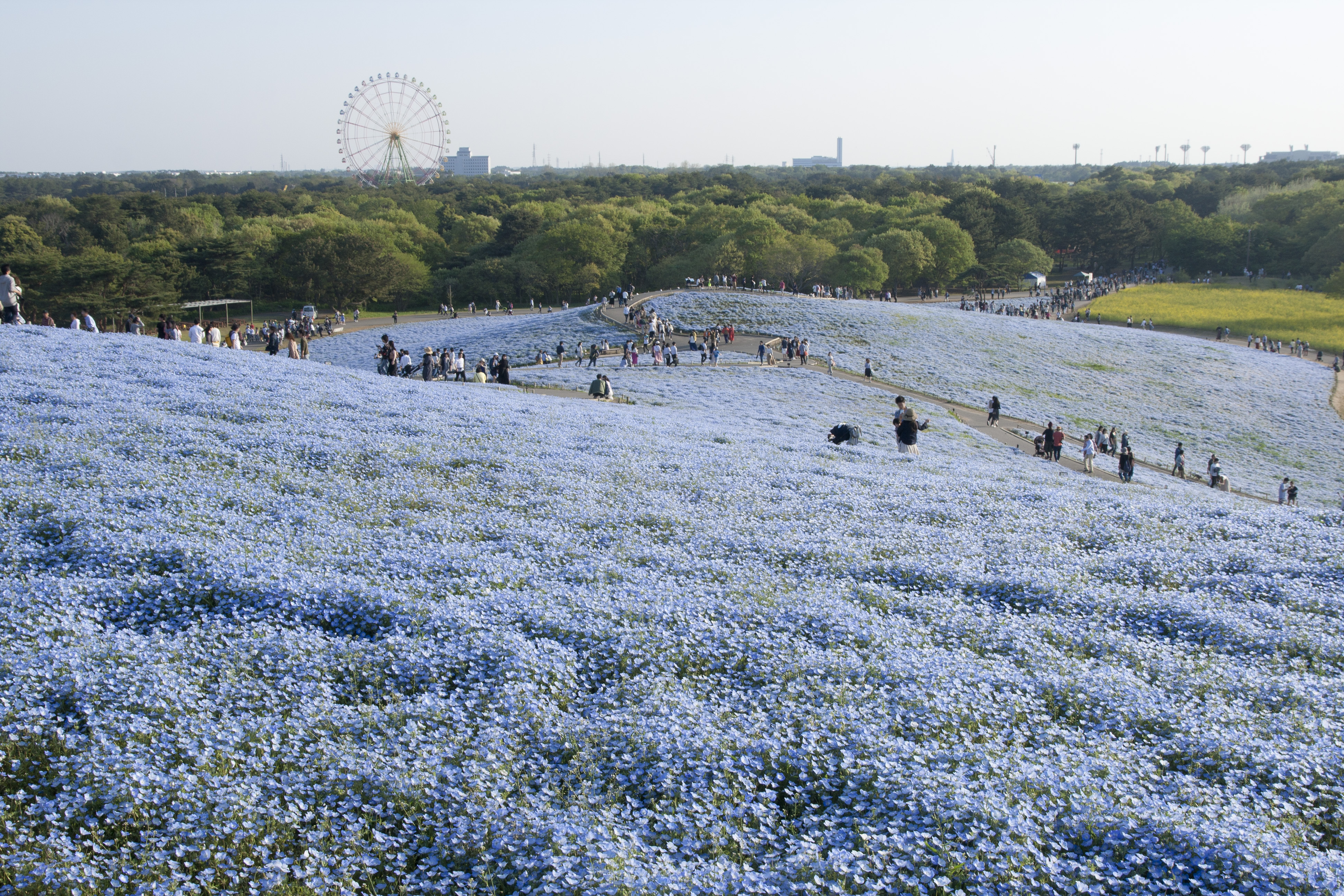
Nemophila in spring in Hitachi Seaside Park

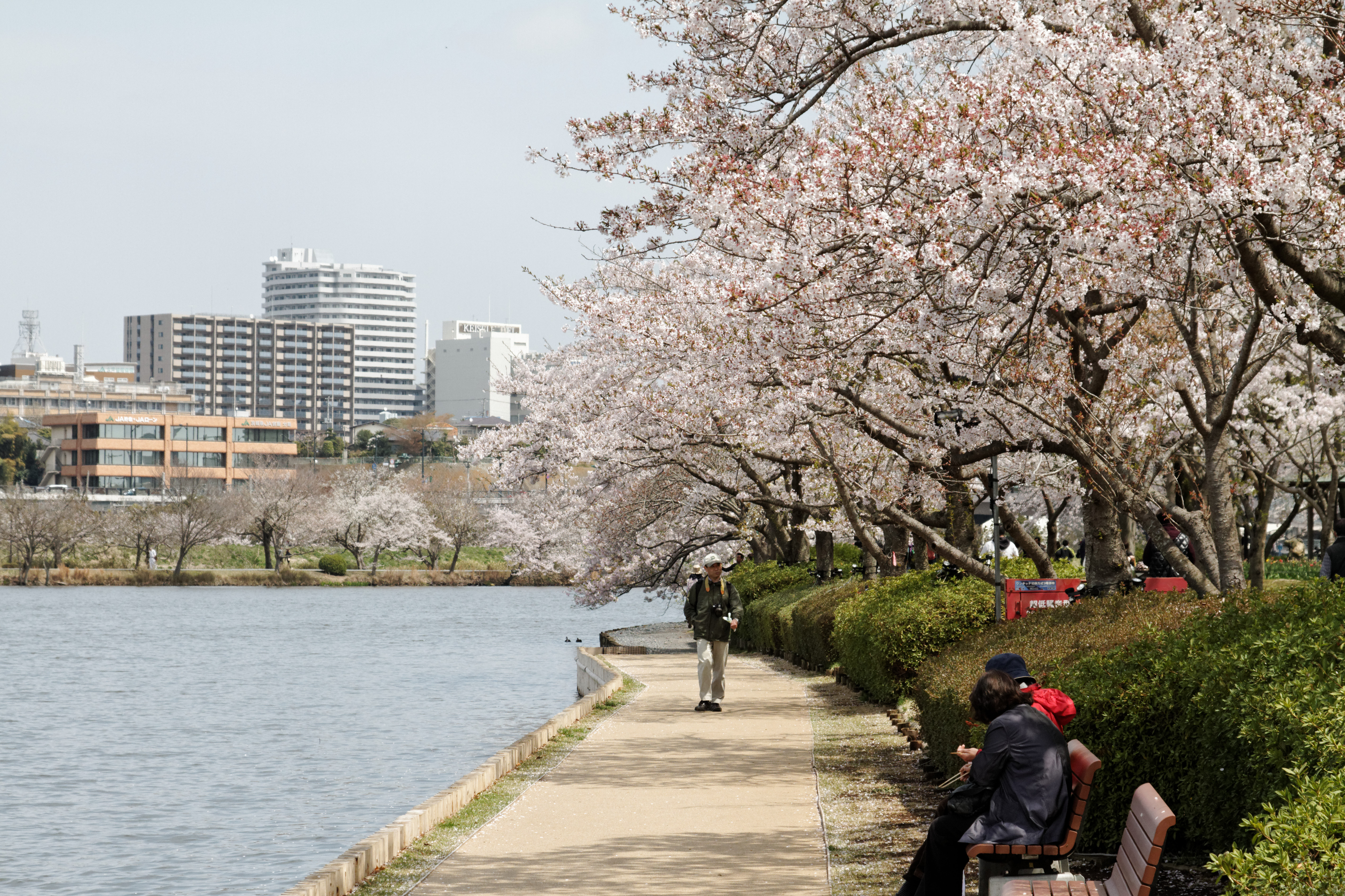
Kairaku-en

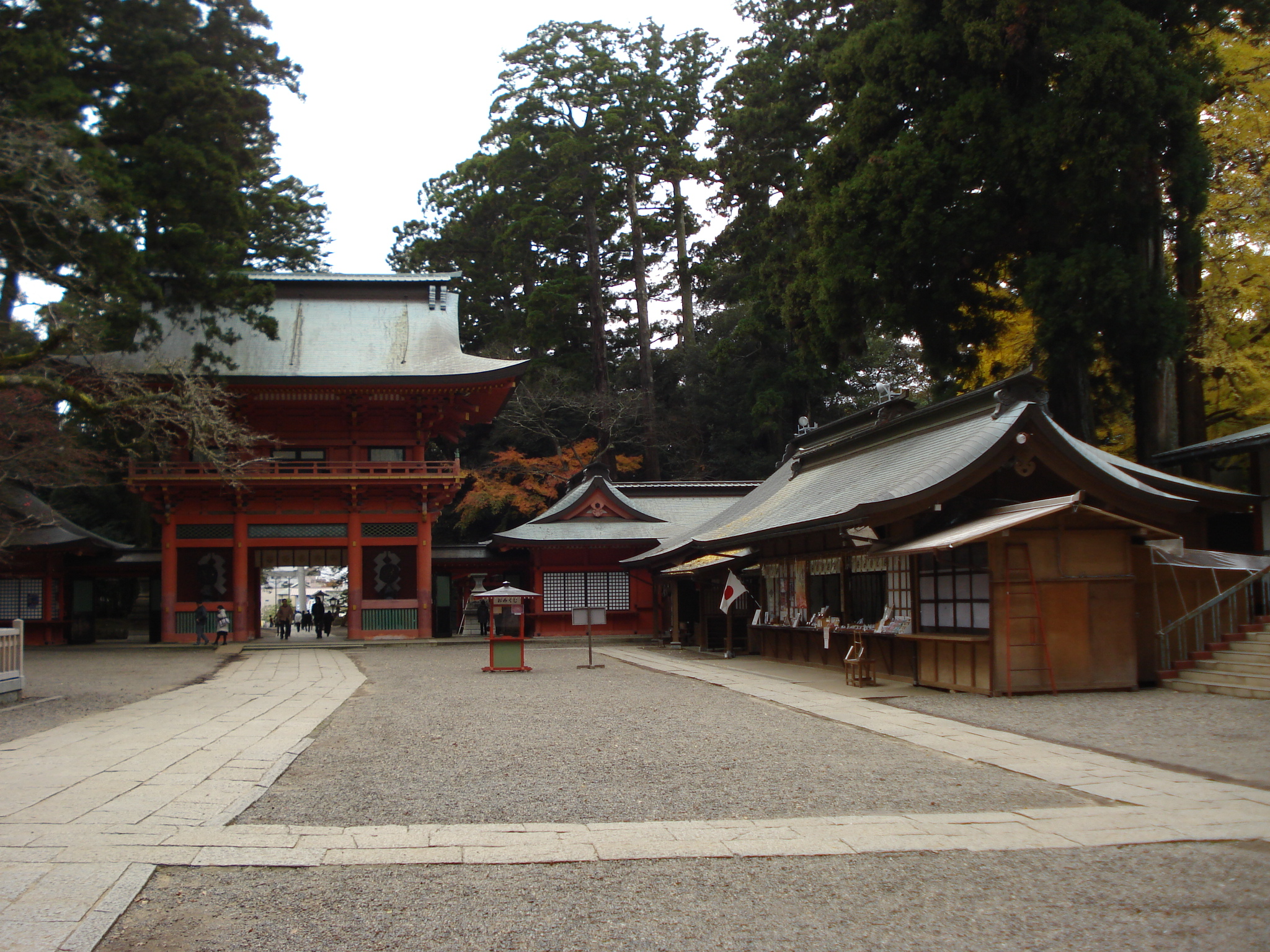
Kashima Shrine

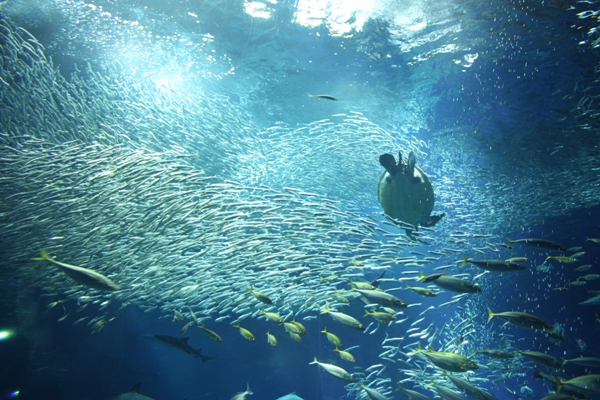
Ōarai Aquarium

== Transportation and access ==
Lines map Kantō Railway, Tsukuba Railway (suspended 1987), and others

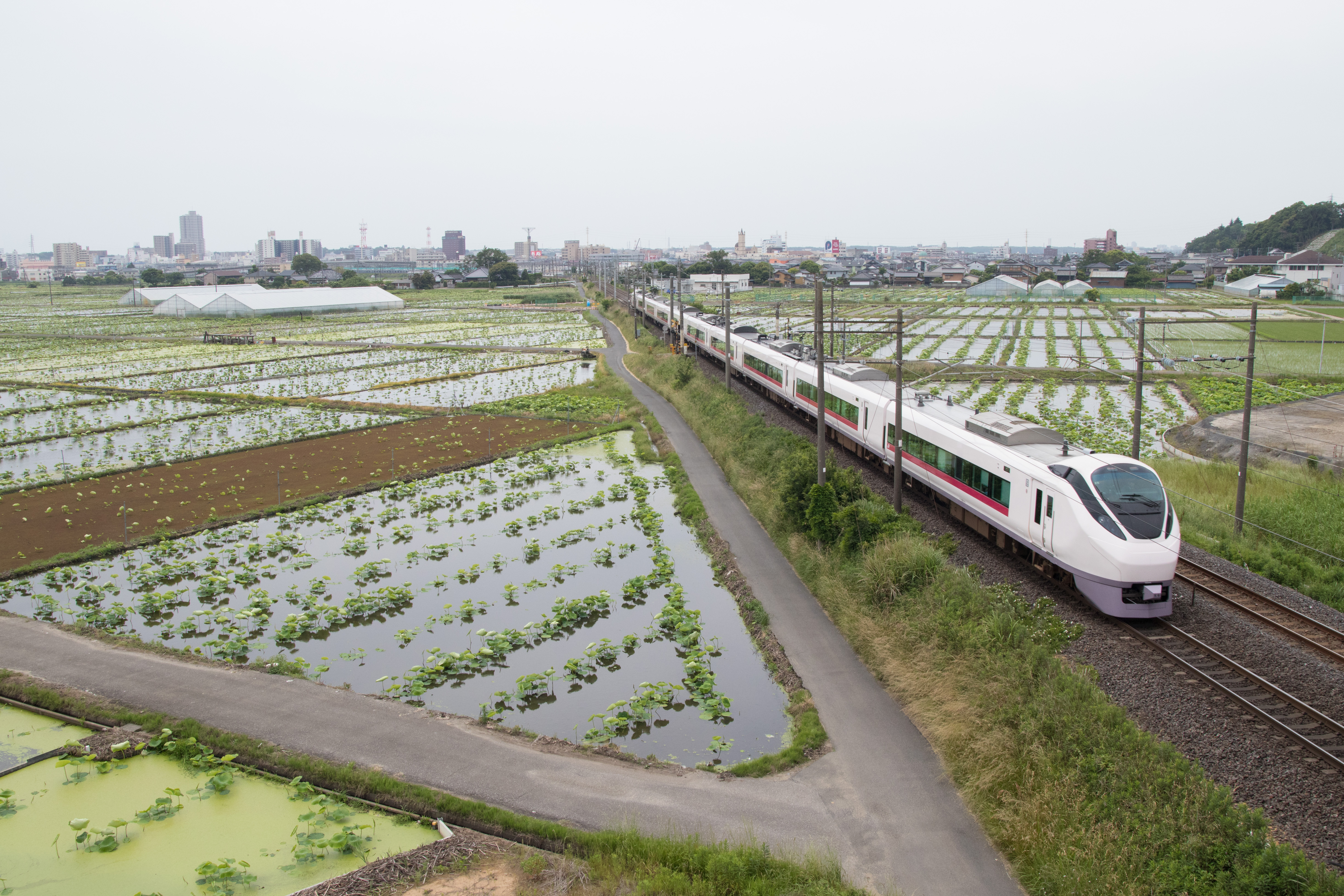
Lotus field and Jōban Line

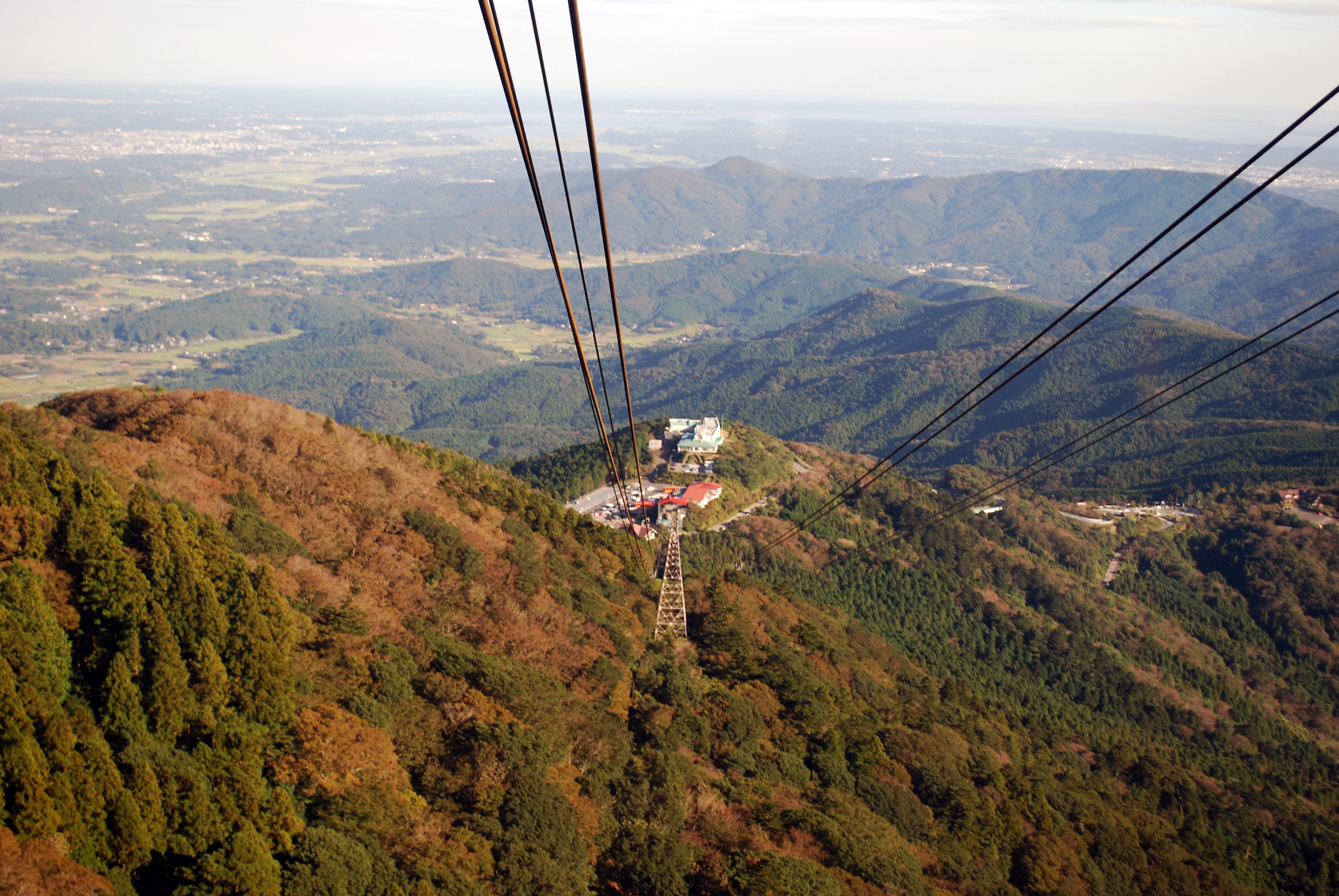
Mount Tsukuba Ropeway

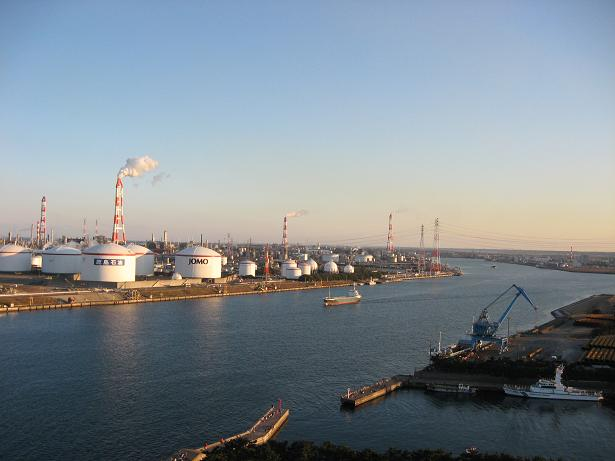
Kashima Port

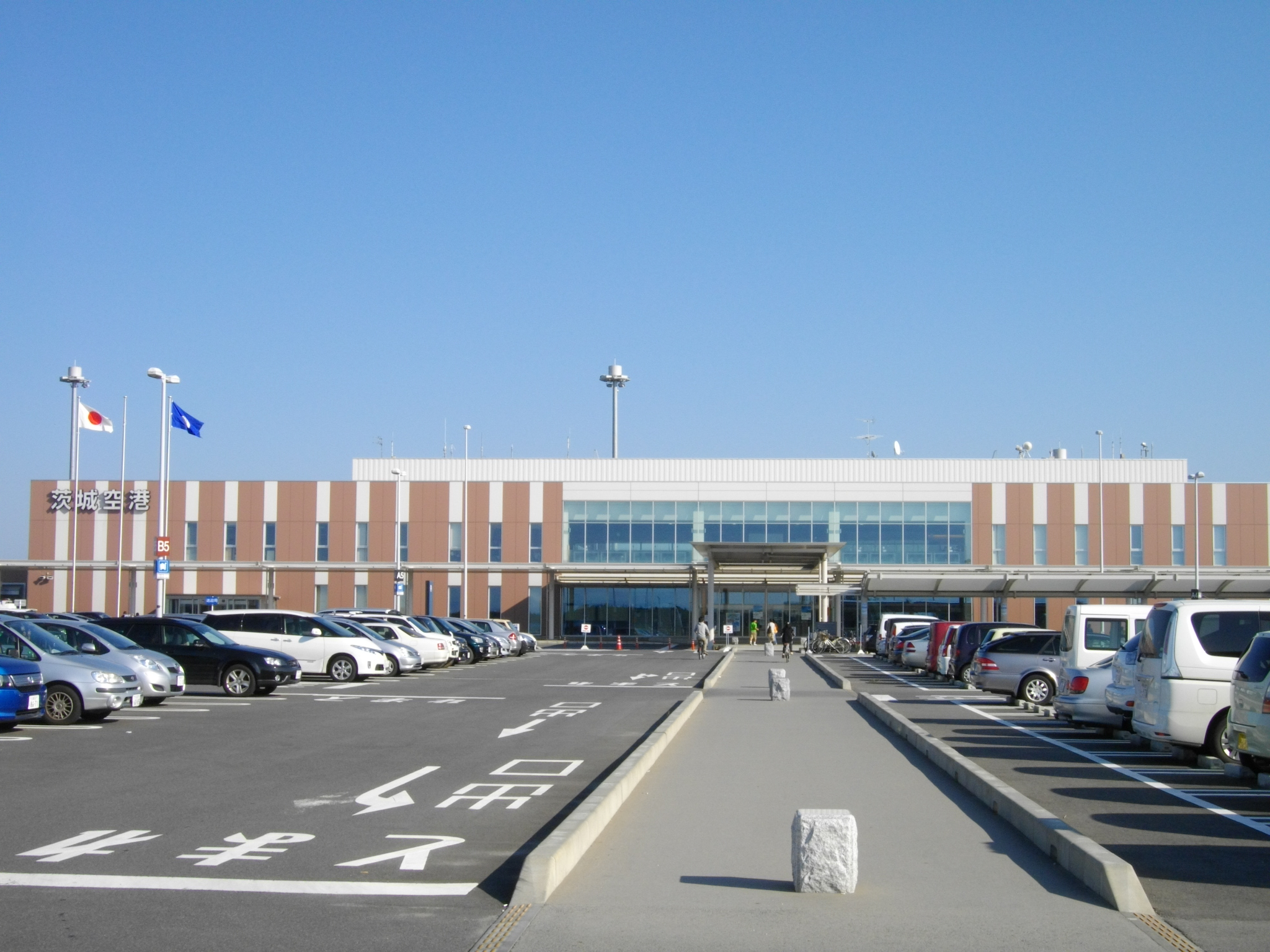
Ibaraki Airport

=== Railways ===
- East Japan Railway Company
  - Jōban Line
  - Kashima Line
  - Mito Line
  - Suigun Line
  - Utsunomiya Line (Tōhoku Main Line)
- Hitachinaka Seaside Railway
  - Minato Line
- Kantō Railway
  - Jōsō Line
  - Ryūgasaki Line
- Kashima Rinkai Railway
  - Kashima Rinkō Line
  - Ōarai Kashima Line
- Metropolitan Intercity Railway Company
  - Tsukuba Express
- Mooka Railway
  - Mooka Line

=== Cable cars ===
- Tsukuba Kankō Railway
  - Mount Tsukuba Cable Car
  - Mount Tsukuba Ropeway

=== Bus ===
- Ibaraki Kotsu

=== Roads ===
==== Expressways ====
- Jōban Expressway
- Ken-Ō Expressway
- Kita-Kantō Expressway
- Higashi-Kantō Expressway

==== National highways ====
Ibaraki Prefecture with the following national routes:

- National Route 4 (around Koga area)
- National Route 6 (Nihonbashi of Tokyo-Toride-Tsuchiura-Mito-Hitachi-Iwaki-Sendai)
- National Route 50
- National Route 51 (Mito-Kashima-Itako-Narita-Chiba)
- National Route 118
- National Route 123
- National Route 124
- National Route 125 (Katori-Tsuchiura-Tsukuba-Koga-Gyōda-Kumagaya)
- National Route 245
- National Route 293
- National Route 294
- National Route 349
- National Route 354
- National Route 355
- National Route 400 (Mito-Nakagawa-Nikko-Minamiaizu-Nishiaizu
- National Route 408
- National Route 461

==== Prefectural routes ====
Ibaraki Prefecture with more than 300 prefectural routes.

=== Ports ===
- Port of Ibaraki

- Port of Hitachi
- Port of Hitachinaka
- Port of Ōarai - Ferry route to Tomakomai, Muroran of Hokkaido

- Port of Kashima

=== Airports ===
- Ibaraki Airport
- Ōtone Airstrip 大利根飛行場 (おおとねひこうじょう, Ōtone Hikōjō) is an airfield located on the Tone River in Kawachi.
- Ryūgasaki Airfield
- Tsukuba Heliport

However, Tokyo's Haneda Airport and Narita International Airport are also used by air travellers from the prefecture.

== Pronunciation ==
The prefecture is often alternatively pronounced "Ibaragi" by those who speak the regional dialect known as Ibaraki-ben. However, the standard pronunciation is "Ibaraki". According to the author of "Not Ibaragi, Ibaraki", this is most likely due to a mishearing of the softening of the "k" sound in Ibaraki dialect.

== Sister region ==
Ibaraki is twinned with:

- Essonne, France

== See also ==
- 2005 Ibaraki gubernatorial election
