= Mito Tokugawa family =

Tokugawa 徳川 (水戸)
- Maruni-mitsubaaoi ("Circle Around Three Hollyhock Leaves"), the mon of the Mito branch of Tokugawa clan
- Home province: Hitachi
- Parent house: Tokugawa clan
- Titles: Daimyō
- Founder: Tokugawa Yorifusa
- Current head: Narimasa Tokugawa
- Founding year: 1608
- Dissolution: still extant

The Mito Tokugawa family (水戸徳川家, Mito Tokugawa-ke) is a branch of the Tokugawa clan based in Mito, Ibaraki.

== History ==
Following the establishment of the Tokugawa shogunate in 1603, Tokugawa Ieyasu appointed his eleventh son, Tokugawa Yorifusa, as daimyō in 1610. With his appointment, Yorifusa became the founding member of the Mito branch of the Tokugawa clan. Along with the Tokugawa branches in Kii and Owari, the Mito branch represented one of three Tokugawa houses known as the Gosanke ("three honourable houses of the Tokugawa").

Although the Mito branch held less land and wealth than either of the other two branches, they maintained considerable influence throughout the Edo period. Mito Domain's promiximity to the de facto capital in Edo was a contributing factor to this power as well as the fact that many people unofficially considered the Mito daimyō to be "vice-shōgun". The Mito branch however, as the lowest of the gosanke, was not eligible for the shōgun rank.

Tokugawa Mitsukuni, the third son of Tokugawa Yorifusa, became the second daimyō of Mito in 1661. Mitsukuni further established Mito's status as a respected han by sponsoring the Dai Nihonshi in 1657. The endeavor would launch Mito's reputation as a center for intellectual thought.

The treasures of the Mito branch are kept in The Tokugawa Museum (彰考館徳川博物館) in Mito.

"If a war were to break out between the Tokugawa shogunate and the Imperial Court, do not hesitate to side with the Imperial Court." This has been the tradition of the Mito Tokugawa family since Lord Mitsukuni.

The 15th head of the Mito House is Narimasa Tokugawa (徳川斉正) (born in 1958). Since July 2009, he is also the director of Mito's Tokugawa Museum. He presently works for Tokio Marine & Nichido Fire Insurance Co., Ltd. A Tokyo resident, he commutes to Mito during weekends.

== Heads ==
1. Tokugawa Yorifusa (1603-1661)
2. Tokugawa Mitsukuni (1628-1701)
3. Tokugawa Tsunaeda (1656-1718)
4. Tokugawa Munetaka (1705-1730)
5. Tokugawa Munemoto (1728-1766)
6. Tokugawa Harumori (1751-1805)
7. Tokugawa Harutoshi (1773-1816)
8. Tokugawa Narinobu (1797-1829)
9. Tokugawa Nariaki (1800-1860)
10. Tokugawa Yoshiatsu (1832-1868)
11. Tokugawa Akitake (1853-1910)
12. Tokugawa Atsuyoshi (1855-1898)
13. Kuniyuki Tokugawa (1886-1969)
14. Kuninari Tokugawa (1912-1986)
15. Narimasa Tokugawa (b. 1958)

== Family tree ==
adoption
(1543–1616); Ieyasu
(1603-1661); Yorifusa^{(1)}
(1622-1695); Matsudaira Yorishige	(1628-1701); Mitsukuni^{(2)}
(1656-1718); Tsunaeda^{(3)}	(1661–1687); Matsudaira; Yoritoshi
(1685–1709); Yoshizane
(1708–1746); Miyohime	(1705-1730); Munetaka^{(4)}
(1728-1766); Munemoto^{(5)}
(1751-1805); Harumori^{(6)}
(1773-1816); Harutoshi^{(7)}
(1797-1829); Narinobu^{(8)}
(1800-1860); Nariaki^{(9)}
(1832-1868); Yoshiatsu^{(10)}	(1837-1913); Yoshinobu
(1853-1910); Akitake^{(11)}
(1855-1898); Atsuyoshi^{(12)}	(1888-1957); Takesada
(1886-1969); Kuniyuki^{(13)}	(1887-1924); Kyoko	Mastudo-Tokugawa family
(1912-1986); Kuninari^{(14)}
(b. 1958); Narimasa^{(15)}
(b. 1990); Nariyori
