= Yorinaga Matsudaira =

Japanese politician

Count Yorinaga Matsudaira
- 松平 頼寿
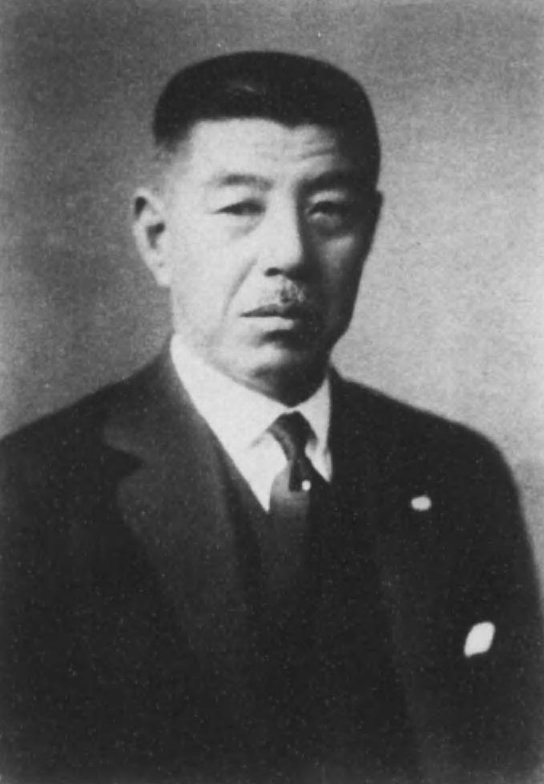

President of the House of Peers
- In office 19 June 1937 – 13 September 1944
- Monarch: Hirohito
- Vice President: Yukitada Sasaki
- Preceded by: Fumimaro Konoe
- Succeeded by: Kuniyuki Tokugawa

Vice President of the House of Peers
- In office 9 June 1933 – 19 June 1937
- President: Fumimaro Konoe
- Preceded by: Fumimaro Konoe
- Succeeded by: Yukitada Sasaki

Member of the House of Peers
- In office 8 August 1914 – 13 September 1944 Elected by the Counts
- In office 28 February 1908 – 9 July 1911 Elected by the Counts

Personal details
- Born: 10 December 1874 Hongō, Tokyo, Japan
- Died: 13 September 1944 (aged 69) Karuizawa, Nagano, Japan
- Resting place: Yanaka Cemetery
- Parent: Matsudaira Yoritoshi (father)

Count Yorinaga Matsudaira (松平 頼寿, Matsudaira Yorinaga; 10 December 1874 – 13 September 1944) was a Japanese political figure of the late Meiji through early Shōwa periods, and served as President of the House of Peers in the Diet of Japan.

== Early life and education ==
Matsudaira attended the Gakushūin Peer's School, and with the sponsorship of Ōkuma Shigenobu, graduated from the law school of Waseda University. district of Tokyo, as the eldest son of Tokugawa Iesato.

== Political career ==
In 1908 he became a member of the House of Peers, and continued to serve as a member every year (except for a hiatus between 1911 and 1914) until his death.

In 1933, he was made Vice-President of the House of Peers, breaking with the precedent that only men with the rank of princes or marquis could service in the highest level positions. Four years later, when Fumimaro Konoe became Prime Minister of Japan, Yorinaga Matsudaira became the President of the House of Peers. He died while in office, and was posthumously awarded the Order of the Rising Sun, 1st class with Paulownia Flowers. His grave is at the Yanaka Cemetery in Tokyo. His nephew Yorihiro Matsudaira succeeded him in his peerage.

== Personal life and family ==
Yorinaga Matsudaira was the eighth son of Matsudaira Yoritoshi, the former daimyō of Matsuyama Domain in Shikoku. His mother, Chiyoko, was the daughter of Ii Naosuke and his wife was the daughter of Tokugawa Akitake, head of the Mito branch of the Tokugawa clan.

A strong supporter of education, Matsudaira donated a large property in downtown Tokyo to create the Hongō Junior and Senior High School. He was also a noted collector of miniature bonsai, and served as honorary president of the Kofuku Bonsai Association. His collection eventually reached a thousand specimens, but many were destroyed after his death during World War II. Around two hundred specimens were preserved by his widow, who wrote an article for the 1953 Handbook on Dwarf Potted Trees issued by the Brooklyn Botanic Garden. In 1975, she published a book in Japanese, Matsudaira Mame Bonsai Collection Album, which included photos of the couple.

=== Ancestry ===
Ancestors of Yorinaga Matsudaira

16. Tokugawa Harumori, 6th Lord of Mito (1751-1805)
8. Tokugawa Harutoshi, 7th Lord of Mito (1773-1816)
17. Ichijō Michiko (1752-1781)
4. Matsudaira Yorihiro, 9th Lord of Takamatsu (1798-1842)
18. Nakayama
9. Nakayama Yaezaki
2. Count Matsudaira Yoritoshi, 11th Lord of Takamatsu (1834-1903)
10. Asada
5. Asada Yae
1. Count Matsudaira Yorinaga
24. Ii Naohide, 12th Lord of Hikone (1729-1789)
12. Ii Naonaka, 13th Lord of Hikone (1766-1831)
25. Ii
6. Tairō Ii Naosuke, 15th Lord of Hikone (1815-1860)
26. Kimita
13. Kimita Tomi (1785-1819)
3. Ii Chiyoko (1846-1927)
14. Senda Takashina
7. Senda Shizue

Political offices
Preceded by Fumimaro Konoe	President of the House of Peers; 1935–1944	Succeeded by Kuniyuki Tokugawa
