= Mito Domain =

Edo period Japanese feudal domain in Hitachi Province

Mito Domain 水戸藩
- under Tokugawa shogunate Japan
- 1602–1871
- Flag
- Capital: Mito Castle
  - Type: Daimyō
- Historical era: Edo period
  - Established: 1602
  - Disestablished: 1871
- Today part of: part of Ibaraki Prefecture

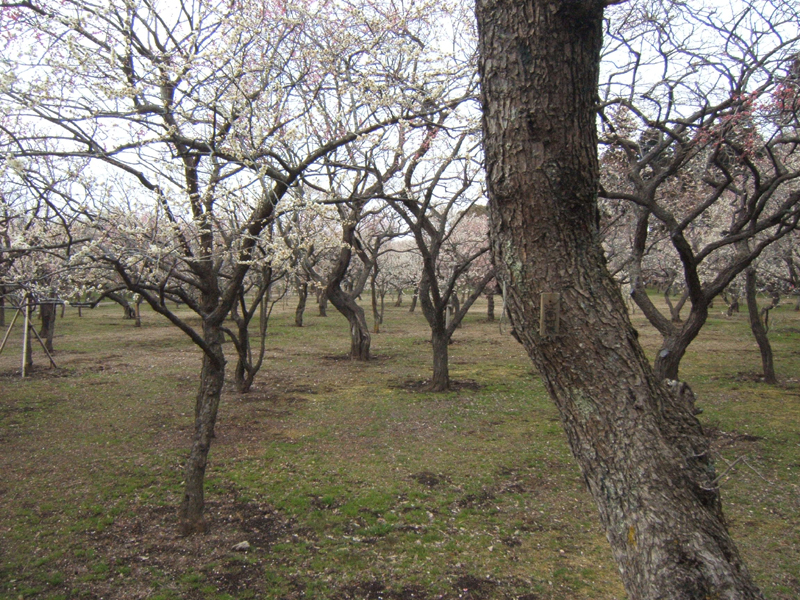
Kairaku-en plum tree garden

Mito (水戸藩, Mito-han) was a Japanese domain of the Edo period. It was associated with Hitachi Province in modern-day Ibaraki Prefecture.

In the han system, Mito was a political and economic abstraction based on periodic cadastral surveys and projected agricultural yields. In other words, the domain was defined in terms of kokudaka, not land area. This was different from the feudalism of the West.

== History ==
The domain's capital was the city of Mito. Beginning with the appointment of Tokugawa Yorifusa by his father, Shōgun Tokugawa Ieyasu, in 1608, the Mito branch of the Tokugawa clan controlled the domain until the abolition of the han system in 1871. During the Edo period, Mito represented the center of nativism largely as a result of the Mitogaku, an influential school of Japanese thought, which advanced the political philosophy of sonnō jōi ("revere the emperor, expel the barbarians") that had become a popular sentiment after 1854. Mito's sponsorship of the Dai Nihon-shi (A History of Great Japan) established the domain's tradition of intellectualism. Later, Mito scholars and their ideology influenced many of the revolutionaries involved in the Meiji Restoration.

=== Edo period ===
Following the establishment of the Tokugawa shogunate in 1603, Tokugawa Ieyasu appointed his eleventh son, Tokugawa Yorifusa, as daimyō in 1608. With his appointment, Yorifusa became the founding member of the Mito branch of the Tokugawa clan. Along with the Tokugawa branches in Kii and Owari, the Mito branch represented one of three Tokugawa houses known as the gosanke.

Although the Mito branch held less land and wealth than either of the other two branches, they maintained considerable influence throughout the Edo period. The domain's promiximity to the de facto capital in Edo was a contributing factor to this power as well as the fact that many people unofficially considered the Mito daimyō to be "vice-shōgun".

Nakayama Nobuyoshi (ja), a young samurai whose father's sacrifice at Odawara was recognized by Ieyasu, was taken in by Ieyasu as a page. Following Sekigahara, he would be rewarded for his service by being named chief retainer to Yorifusa, and his descendants subsequently given the hereditary lordship of the Matsuoka Domain as a subordinate domain of Mito following his own bravery serving Yorifusa at Osaka.

Tokugawa Mitsukuni, the third son of Tokugawa Yorifusa, became the second daimyō of Mito in 1661. Mitsukuni further established Mito's status as a respected han by sponsoring the Dai Nihon-shi in 1657. The endeavor would launch Mito's reputation as a center for intellectual thought.

=== Mito School ===
The Mito School (Mitogaku) was an influential school of Japanese thought which advocated isolationism, nativism, and reverence of the emperor. The origins of this Neo-Confucianist movement date to Mitsukuni's decision to establish a historiographical organization known as the Shōkōkan in 1657. Mitsukuni recruited educated scholars to the Shōkōkan to study the history and philosophy of Japan. Mitsukuni initiated the creation of the Dai Nihon-shi by the scholars in order to compile a history of Japan which would focus on the imperial line. Each chapter of the "Annals" in the Dai Nihon-shi concentrated on the rule of a specific emperor. The project took more than two hundred and fifty years to finish, and it was officially published in 1906.

While scholars were compiling the Dai Nihon-shi, the Mito domain experienced agricultural and economic problems. Beginning as early as 1688, financial ruin plagued Mito and discontent grew in the domain. In addition to the financial issues, famines and natural disasters were common occurrences. In 1709, dissatisfied peasants staged the largest rebellion in the history of the domain. An increasing number of discontent citizens in Mito embraced the works of the early Mito scholars for their reverence of the emperor and their anti-foreign ideology. These works inspired waves of nationalism and loyalty to the imperial family during the 17th century.

During these disorderly years, the Mito scholarship grew into a renowned school of thought in Japan. Under Mitsukuni's leadership, the Dai Nihon-shi significantly expanded to seventy-three chapters of the "Annals" and one hundred and seventy chapters of "Biographies" by the time of his death in 1700. In 1720, the Mito scholars finished the "Annals" and "Biographies" and offered them to the bakufu. These events signalled the end of the early Mito school. For the next seven decades, the Shōkōkan made very little progress with the Dai Nihon-shi without the guidance of Mitsukuni. in 1786, Tachihara Suiken took over leadership of the Shōkōkan and resumed work on the compilation. Fujita Yūkoku became the head of the institute after Tachihara, and he pushed for more focus on the history of that period. During the late 18th century, two factions within the Shōkōkan emerged. Fujita and the other opponents of Tachihara called for the removal of Asaka Tanpaku's "Appraisals" as well as the changing of the name Dai Nihon-shito "Nihon" or "Yamato". The struggle between the two factions eventually led to the house arrest of Fujita in 1797. By 1807, Fujita was once again in power and Tachihara had left the institute.

As Mito thought developed during the 19th century, the scholars began to emphasize anti-Western sentiment and the importance of the emperor in Japanese society. In particular, Mito scholars embraced the political slogan "sonnō jōi" which means "Revere the Emperor and Expel the Barbarians". The scholar Aizawa Seishisai was the first advocate of this philosophy in Japan. In 1825, he wrote New Proposals, which presented his ideas about the need to protect Japan from the Western 'barbarians'. He promoted nativism and opposition to Western force, trade, and belief systems. He was particularly a fierce opponent of Christianity, which in his view undermined Japanese values. Seishisai likewise advocated support of the emperor as a method of confronting the Western threat from abroad. In the work, Seishisai also advanced the idea of kokutai ("national essence") which combined Confucian morals, Shinto myths, and other philosophies. According to Seishisai, the Japanese imperial family were direct descendants of Amaterasu, the Sun Goddess, so Japan was supposed to establish the proper standard for other nations to emulate. New Proposals served as an inspiration for Japanese nationalists throughout the 19th century leading up to the Meiji Restoration–1869.

Mito thought stressed other ideas concerning the role of morality in Tokugawa Japan. Fujita, a prominent scholar, argued that Japanese civilization would end as a result of internal problems rather than external threats. Other writers of the late Mito school such as Fujita Toko and Seishisai also agreed that lack of moral leadership would weaken Japan from within and expose the country to the invasion of Westerners. Many of the Mito scholars worried about economic collapse, and Fujita especially recognized that many financial troubles in Mito were present throughout Japan. Basing his argument on Neo-Confucianism, Fujita reasoned that the emperor grants power to the shōgun to confront domestic and foreign dangers. Fujita and the other Mito scholars decided that the shogunate had not upheld its duty to preserve the defense or economic prosperity of Japan. Fujita suggested that the bakufu should push for reforms, and the daimyōs should implement the reforms. Fujita's ideas represented radical challenges to the bakufu system because he was arguing that the bakufu had failed to address important issues. Fujita concluded that the shogunate had caused the domains to become economically and militarily weak.

=== Tokugawa Nariaki and decline of the Shogunate ===
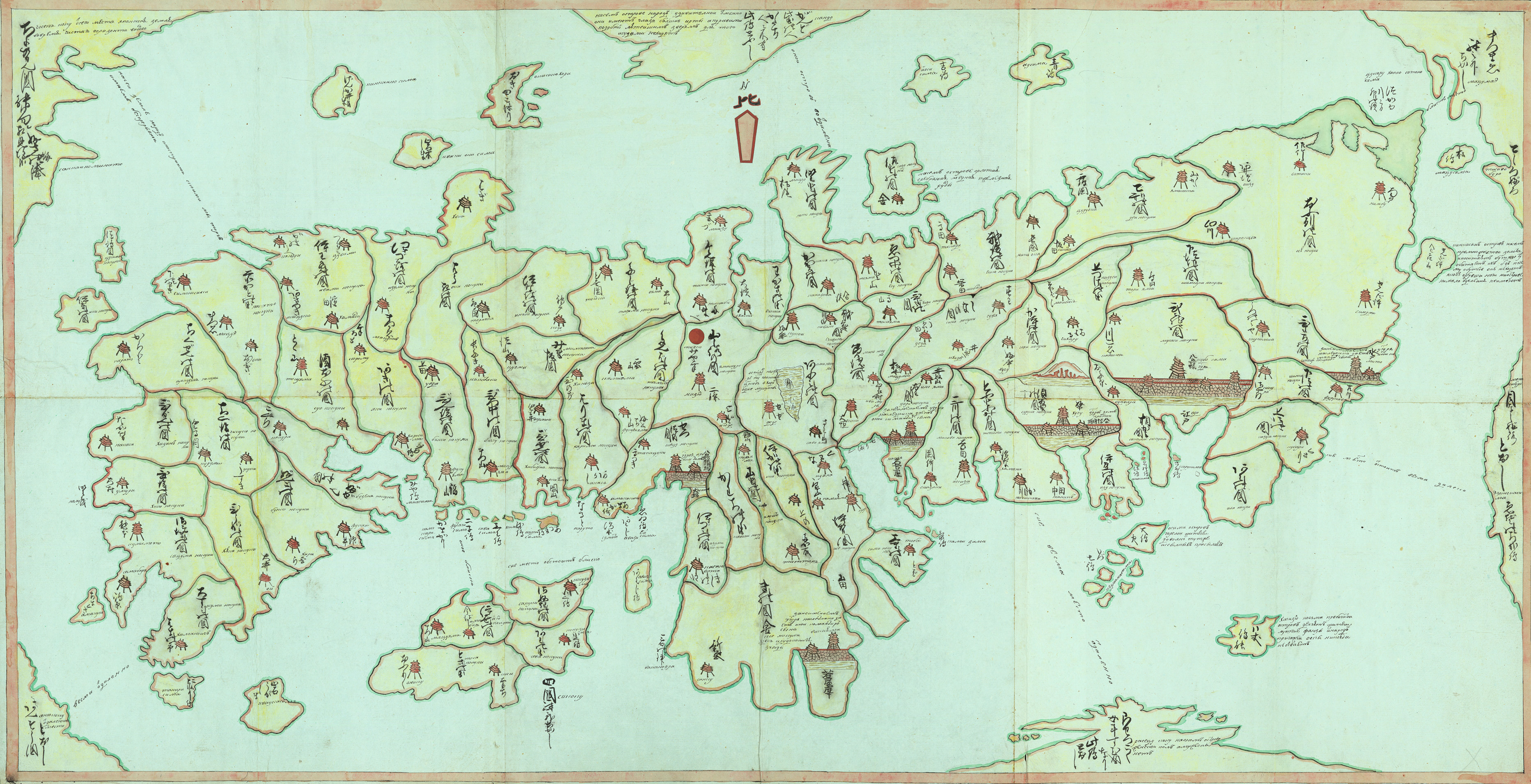
Map of Japan, 1789. The Han system affected cartography.

Tokugawa Nariaki became the daimyō of Mito in 1829, and he developed into an important figure in the nationalist movement in Japan during the 1850s and 1860s. Nariaki was one of the most radical defenders of Japan's seclusion from the West. Starting in 1830, Nariaki vocally supported the ideas of the Mito school by championing sonnō jōi and demanding that the shogunate honor the emperor by fulfilling its duties. Traditionally the term Shōgun means "Barbarian exterminating Lord"(this term goes back to the Heian Era, if not before then). Westerners had been termed "barbarians" by the Japanese since their arrival in the 16th century. The first Tokugawa Shōgun, Tokugawa Ieyasu, expelled all foreign powers from Japan and closed it off from the rest of the world. The Dutch were allowed one trading port at Nagasaki which was under strict regulation. Aside from this one small Dutch trading port, Japan remained closed off until 1854 when the shogunate signed a treaty allowing the "barbarians" access to the country of Japan for the purpose of trade. Of course it would be the duty of the Shōgun to expel the "barbarians" from the country on behalf of the emperor. Nariaki believed that Japan's inability to confront foreign and domestic problems was due to the shogunate's mismanagement and selfishness. In his mind, the shogunate had failed to protect the country and instead had focused on the interests of the bakufu. He stated that the shōgun should strengthen Japan's defenses and initiate necessary reforms in order to create a strong, prosperous Japan. Ultimately, Nariaki's determination and criticism of the shogunate caused him to become popular among segments of the population. While Nariaki was very critical of the shogunate, he still acknowledged that the emperor delegated power to the shōgun. Nariaki only wanted the shogunate to change its policies, and he did not openly support the overthrow of the bakufu. He believed that the political philosophy of sonnō jōi would benefit Japan, the shogunate, the emperor, and the people.

Along with many Mito scholars, Nariaki grew increasingly concerned with the monetary problems in Mito. In Nariaki's view, Japan was experiencing a financial crisis as samurai and peasants suffered under the economic conditions. Drawing on his Confucian beliefs, Nariaki believed that Japan needed a revival of morality in order to combat weakness. He feared that the country may be plunged into chaos if famine or Western imperialism threatened the nation. In response, he called for the shogunate to rebuild the military and economy of Japan (leading to Fukoku kyōhei) and for the shōgun to provide guidance. The policies of the shogunate, however, continued to provide a barrier to reform in the domains. A few years later in 1836, a nationwide famine occurred, and uprisings spread across Japan as Nariaki had predicted. In 1840, the Opium War began between China and Britain, and Nariaki's predictions about Western interference also appeared to be a legitimate concern.

After the events of the 1830s, the shogunate agreed with Nariaki's calls for reform. Despite this agreement, however, the shogunate forced Nariaki into early retirement. This action angered Nariaki's supporters in Mito as well as other daimyōs who agreed with Nariaki's beliefs. Later, Rōjū Abe Masahiro brought Nariaki out of retirement to be an adviser on foreign policy because he respected Nariaki's experience and views. Additionally, Nariaki's warnings about Western involvement in Japanese affairs also led Abe to conclude that Nariaki was knowledgeable about the issue. Throughout the 1840s, the Western nations applied increasing pressure on Japan to open its market to Western goods. Western pressure on Japan culminated in 1853, with the arrival of Commodore Matthew Perry and the Black Ships, which presented a significant challenge to Japanese isolationism. Perry demanded the opening of Japanese ports for trade with the United States. Abe sought a consensus from the daimyōs on how to solve the Western problem. The daimyōs failed to reach a consensus on either fighting the United States or agreeing to trade, so Abe had no other option but to agree to the United States' demands in the Convention of Kanagawa. The inability of the shogunate to defend Japan from the West immediately undermined the people's confidence in the bakufu. Consequently, Abe resigned after the event, and Hotta Masayoshi replaced him.

In 1858, Hotta met with Emperor Kōmei and submitted the Harris Treaty, which allowed for Westerners to trade in Japan and granted them extraterritoriality. The emperor refused to support the treaty, and the anti-foreign movement in Mito and other domains saw the event as an opportunity to unite behind the emperor. Hotta's failure to obtain the emperor's support further reinforced the Mito loyalist's belief that they had to revere the emperor and confront the 'barbarian' West.

The death of Shōgun Tokugawa Iesada in 1858 led to a power struggle over the succession of the shōgun. At the same time, various factions were debating the foreign policy issue, and the stability of the Tokugawa shogunate was compromised. There were two potential shōgun, and one of them was Hitotsubashi Keiki, Nariaki's son. To solve the problem, the fudai daimyōs put Ii Naosuke in charge as great councilor (Tairō) of the shogunate. Ii decided to punish supporters of Nariaki in order to re-establish the power of the shogunate. While Ii was temporarily successful in maintaining order, his purge of Nariaki supporters in the domains and the court, the Ansei Purge, drove young Mito radicals to assassinate him in 1860 (Sakuradamon Incident). In response to the assassination, the shogunate pacified the radicals by changing shogunal policies in the Bunkyū Reforms and naming Hitotsubashi Keiki as guardian of the shōgun.

=== Meiji Restoration ===
Throughout the decades leading up to the Meiji Restoration, the Mito daimyō as well as the Mito scholars undermined the bakufu through their calls for reform and their direct action. Tokugawa Nariaki repeatedly criticized the shogunate for their moral decay and inability to protect Japan from financial ruin or foreign invasion. The Mito school of thought likewise provided a nationalist, pro-royal ideology which influenced many of the leading anti-bakufu revolutionaries. While the Mito scholars never actually called for the overthrow of the bakufu, their emphasis on internal and external threats to Japan impacted the political views of the revolutionaries. The Mito school of thought had a profound impact on many individuals because the Mito domain had a tradition of intellectualism which lent legitimacy to the anti-foreign views of the scholars. During the 1840s, Nariaki's support of these views allowed for an entire generation to grow up with these ideas. Maki Izumi, a leading revolutionary, admitted to being strongly affected by Mito beliefs. The Mitogaku played a major role in inspiring the anti-bakufu elements in Japan to unite and lead the Meiji Restoration.

Mito radicals initiated many of the violent acts which led to the overthrow of the bakufu as well. Starting with the assassination of Ii Naosuke, nationalist terrorism spread in Japan. In Mito, anti-foreign loyalists staged a rebellion, which involved the son of Fujita Toko. The bakufu and domain military forces joined together in order to crush the uprising, and the loyalist movement temporarily lost momentum.

In 1864, the "Tengu insurrection" occurred in which armed Mito rebels confronted the bakufu in battle. The Tengu band, led by Fujita Koshirō, included thousands of troops from Mito who defeated the troops of several other domains. Later, a major battle occurred where a thousand of the rebels surrendered with the promise of mercy from the conservatives. Ironically, the opposition was led by Hitotsubashi Keiki. The conservatives, however, lied and executed the leaders of the insurrection. The Tengu insurrection was an important event because it represented the growing discontent with the bakufu in the years immediately leading up to the Meiji Restoration. Mito forces were involved in many of the early uprisings before the successful Restoration. While Mito did not have a major role in the fighting like Satsuma and Chōshū, the Mito ideology did however influence the revolutionaries in Satsuma and Chōshū to fight for the emperor.

== List of daimyōs ==
The hereditary daimyōs were heads of the clan and head of the domain.

- Takeda Clan, 1602–1603 (150,000 koku)
1. Takeda Nobuyoshi (1602–1603)
- Kishu Tokugawa family, 1603–1609) (200,000 koku)
1. Tokugawa Yorinobu (1603–1609)
- Mito Tokugawa family, 1609–1871 (250,000 koku)
1. Yorifusa (1609–1661)
2. Mitsukuni (1661–1690)
3. Tsunaeda (1690–1718)
4. Munetaka (1718–1730)
5. Munemoto (1730–1766)
6. Harumori (1766–1805)
7. Harutoshi (1805–1816)
8. Narinobu (1816–1829)
9. Nariaki (1829–1844)
10. Yoshiatsu (1844–1868)
11. Akitake (1868–1871)

=== Simplified family tree (Mito-Tokugawa) ===
- Tokugawa Ieyasu, 1st Tokugawa Shōgun (1543–1616; r. 1603–1605)
  - I.Yorifusa, 1st Lord of Mito (cr. 1609) (1603–1661; r. 1609–1661)
    - II. Mitsukuni, 2nd Lord of Mito (1628–1701; r. 1661–1690)
    - Matsudaira Yorishige, 1st Lord of Takamatsu (1622–1695)
      - III. Tsunaeda, 3rd Lord of Mito (1656–1718; r. 1690–1718)
      - Matsudaira Yoritoshi (1661–1687)
        - Matsudaira Yoritoyo, 3rd Lord of Takamatsu (1680–1735)
          - IV. Munetaka, 4th Lord of Mito (1705–1730; r. 1718–1730)
            - V. Munemoto, 5th Lord of Mito (1728–1766; r. 1730–1766)
              - VI. Harumori, 6th Lord of Mito (1751–1805; r. 1766–1805)
                - VII. Harutoshi, 7th Lord of Mito (1773–1816; r. 1805–1816)
                  - VIII. Narinobu, 8th Lord of Mito (1797–1829; r. 1816–1829)
                  - IX. Nariaki, 9th Lord of Mito (1800–1860; r. 1829–1844)
                    - XI. Akitake, 11th Lord of Mito and family head, 1st Viscount (1853–1910; r. 1868–1869; Governor of Mito: 1869–1871; 11th family head: 1868–1883; Viscount: 1892). He had issue and descendants.
                    - X. Yoshiatsu, 10th Lord of Mito (1832–1868; r. 1844–1868)
                      - Atsuyoshi, 12th family head, 1st Marquess (1855–1898; 12th family head: 1883–1898; Marquess: 1884)
                        - Kuniyuki, 13th family head, 1st Prince (1886–1969; 13th family head: 1898–1969; 2nd Marquess: 1898–1929; Prince: 1929–1947)
                          - Kuninari, 14th family head (1912–1986; 14th family head: 1969–1986)
                            - Narimasa, 15th family head (b. 1958; 15th family head: 1986–present)
                              - Narinori (b. 1990)

== See also ==
- List of Han
- Abolition of the han system
- Satake clan: pre-Sekigahara ruler of Mito
- Tokugawa clan
- Iwakitaira Domain: northern neighbor
- Hikone Domain: hostile domain at the Sakuradamon incident (1860)

== Sources ==
- Duus, Peter. Modern Japan. Boston: Houghton Mifflin Company, 1998.
- Hane, Mikiso. Modern Japan: A Historical Survey. Boulder: Westview Press, 2001.
- Harootunian, H. D. Toward Restoration. Berkeley: University of California Press, 1970.
- "History Of Mito". 7 June 2006. City of Mito. 25 July 2007. <https://web.archive.org/web/20070910090322/http://www.city.mito.ibaraki.jp/english/profile/history.htm>.
- Kracht, Klaus. Das Kôdôkanki-jutsugi des Fujita Tôko (1806–1855). Ein Beitrag zum politischen Denken der Späten Mito-Schule. Wiesbaden: Otto Harrassowitz Verlag, 1975.
- Koschmann, J. Victor. Conflict in Modern Japanese History. Princeton: Princeton University Press, 1982.
- Koschmann, J. Victor. The Mito Ideology. Berkeley: University of California Press, 1987.
- Lamberti, Matthew V. Tokugawa Nariaki and the Japanese Imperial Institution: 1853–1858. Harvard Journal of Asiatic Studies. Vol. 32 (1972), p. 97–123.
- Sakata, Yoshio. The Motivation of Political Leadership in the Meiji Restoration. The Journal of Asian Studies. Vol. 16, No. 1 (November, 1956), p. 31–50.
