= Matsudaira Yoritoshi =

Japanese daimyō

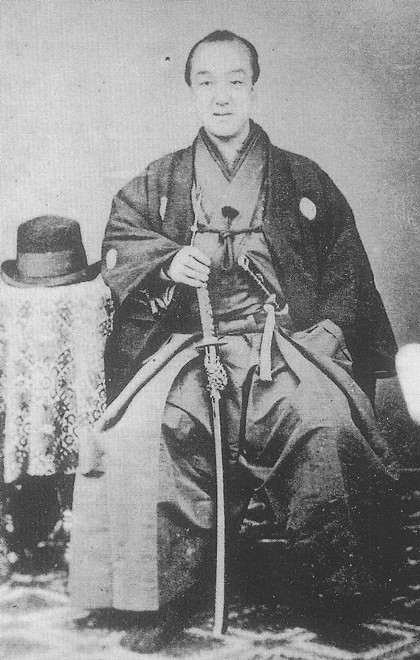
Matsudaira Yoritoshi, the last daimyo of Takamatsu

Matsudaira Yoritoshi (松平 頼聰) (September 6, 1834 – October 17, 1903) was a Japanese daimyō of the late Edo period, who ruled the Takamatsu Domain. Yoritoshi was the son-in-law of Ii Naosuke. His court title was Sanuki no kami. Yoritoshi was adopted as heir to Matsudaira Yoritane, the incumbent lord of Takamatsu, in 1853, and succeeded Yoritane as lord in 1861. Under his leadership, Takamatsu forces supported the security operations of the Tokugawa shogunate in the Kyoto area. During the Kinmon Incident, Takamatsu troops helped defend the imperial palace. His forces took part in the Battle of Toba–Fushimi, and in response, the imperial court stripped him of rank and title. Yoritoshi then put himself under domiciliary confinement, and had a senior retainer executed; this led to an imperial pardon.

Yoritoshi became a count (hakushaku) in the kazoku nobility in 1884, and died in 1903. His son Yorinaga Matsudaira succeeded him as count.

== Ancestry ==
Ancestors of Matsudaira Yoritoshi

16. Tokugawa Munemoto, 5th daimyō of Mito (1728–1766)
8. Tokugawa Harumori, 6th daimyō of Mito (1751–1805)
17. Sakakibara
4. Tokugawa Harutoshi, 7th daimyō of Mito (1773–1816)
18. Ichijō Michika (1722–1769)
9. Ichijō Michiko (1752–1781)
19. Ikeda Shizuko
2. Matsudaira Yorihiro, 9th daimyō of Takamatsu (1798–1842)
10. Nakayama
5. Nakayama Yaezaki
1. Count Matsudaira Yoritoshi, 11th daimyō of Takamatsu
6. Asada
3. Asada Yae

Preceded by Matsudaira Yoritane	11th Daimyō of Takamatsu (Mito-Matsudaira); 1861–1871	Succeeded by none
