= Aizawa Seishisai =

Japanese philosopher (1782–1863)

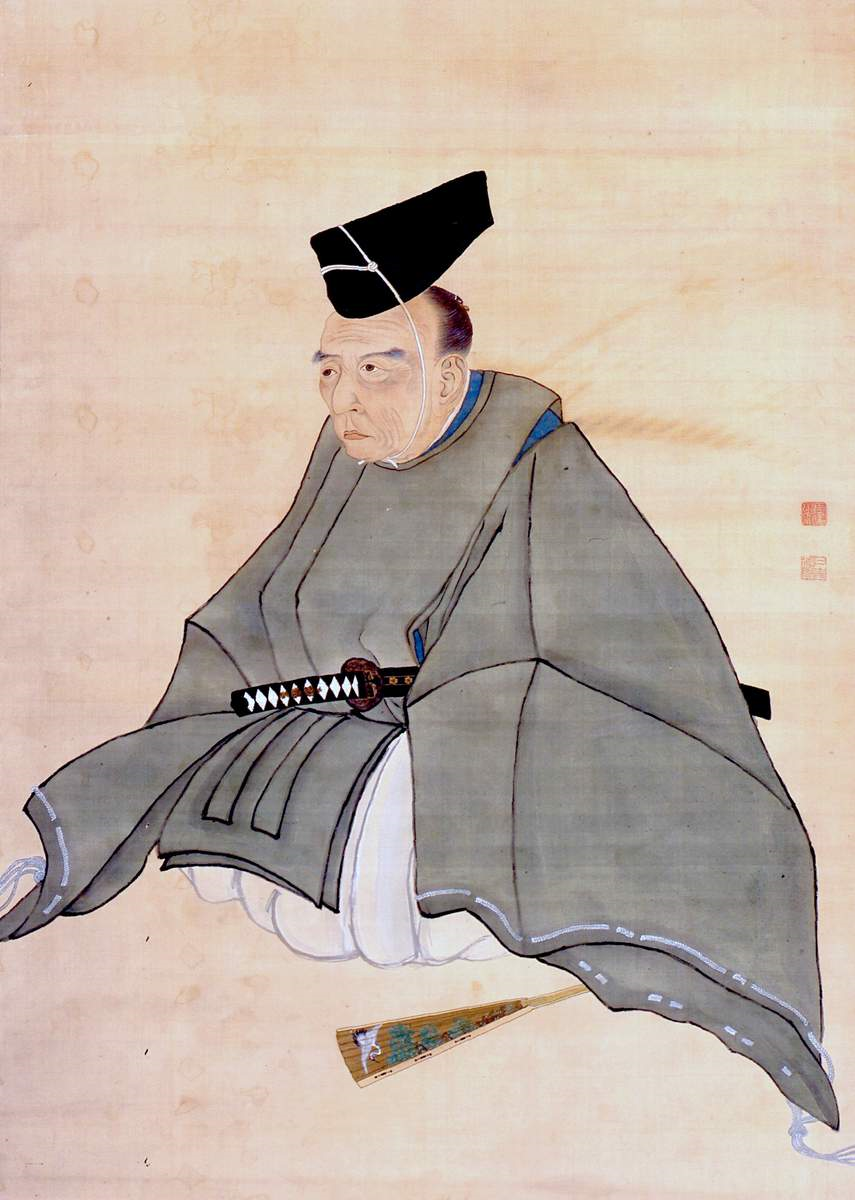
Aizawa Seishisai

Aizawa Seishisai (会沢 正志斎; July 5, 1782 – August 27, 1863), born Aizawa Yasushi (会沢 安), was a Japanese samurai (retainer of the Mito Domain) and a nationalist thinker of the Mito school during the late shogunate period.

In 1799 he became involved in the compilation of the Dai Nihon-shi (Great History of Japan) being undertaken by the Mito school.

In 1825 he wrote his Shinron ("New Theses"), a collection of essays that dealt with issues such as Tokugawa defence policy and how the ships were a threat to Japan. Aizawa also tried to describe conditions in the West and theorize why those states had gained so much control; in his opinion Westerners used religion to inculcate conformity in the masses.

He considered that Christianity was used by the colonial powers to subvert native cultures and governments by creating a fifth column that would collaborate with and facilitate military conquest by Europeans. He discussed the religious policies established by the Toyotomi government and continued by their successors, the Tokugawa shogunate, in this context.

Furthermore, he believed that if Japan's way of life was to survive, it would need to take up its own state religion in order to prevent cultural assimilation via Christianization, and discussed the concept of kokutai ("national polity") in this context. The Shinron became an important work for the sonnō jōi movement, and his theory of the Kokutai was developed by later thinkers.

In 1840 Aizawa became the first head of professors of the Mito school's Kōdōkan, but was forced to resign in 1844 when Tokugawa Nariaki resigned as domain leader. He later returned to the Kōdōkan.

== Quotes ==
Our Divine Land is where the sun rises and where the primordial energy originates. The heirs of the Great Sun have occupied the Imperial Throne from generation to generation without change from time immemorial. Japan's position at the vertex of the earth makes it the standard for the nations of the world. Indeed, it casts its light over the world, and the distance which the resplendent imperial influence reaches knows no limit. Today, the alien barbarians of the West, the lowly organs of the legs and feet of the world, are dashing about across the seas, trampling other countries underfoot, and daring, with their squinting eyes and limping feet, to override the noble nations. What manner of arrogance is this!

— Aizawa Seishisai (1800s)

== See also ==
- Gaspar Coelho, who came into conflict with Toyotomi Hideyoshi over the issue of Christian subversion
- San Felipe incident (1596), after which Hideyoshi became convinced of Christian plans for the ultimate conquest of Japan

== Sources ==
- Wakabayashi, Bob Tadashi (1986). Anti-Foreignism and Western Learning in Early-Modern Japan: The New Theses of 1825. Harvard University Press. ISBN 0-674-04025-2.
- Josephson, Jason Ā. (2012). The Invention of Religion in Japan. Chicago: University of Chicago Press. ISBN 9780226412351.
