= Kuniyuki Tokugawa =

Japanese politician

Prince Kuniyuki Tokugawa
- 徳川 圀順
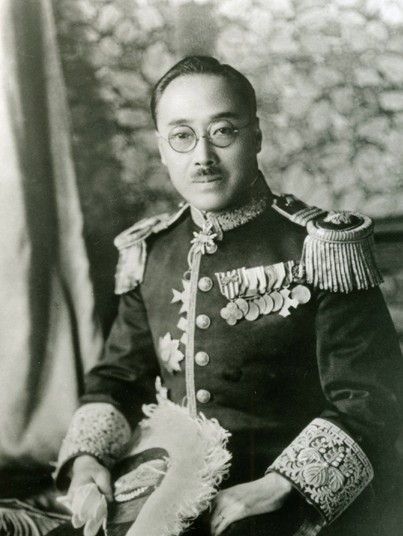
- Official photo

President of the House of Peers
- In office 11 October 1944 – 19 June 1946
- Monarch: Hirohito
- Vice President: Yukitada Sasaki; Sakai Tadamasa; Muneyoshi Tokugawa
- Preceded by: Yorinaga Matsudaira
- Succeeded by: Iemasa Tokugawa

Member of the House of Peers
- In office 12 December 1911 – 19 June 1946 Hereditary peerage

Personal details
- Born: 13 December 1886 Sumida, Tokyo, Japan
- Died: 17 November 1969 (aged 82) Setagaya, Tokyo, Japan
- Relatives: Mito Tokugawa family

Prince Kuniyuki Tokugawa (徳川圀順, Tokugawa Kuniyuki; 13 December 1886 – 17 November 1969) was the 13th head of the Mito branch of the Tokugawa clan and the President of the House of Peers in the Diet of Japan.

== Biography ==
Kuniyuki Tokugawa inherited the title of shishaku (侯爵, marquis) under the kazoku peerage system on the death of his father, Tokugawa Atsuyoshi in 1898. A scholar, he turned his attention in 1906 to the completion of the Dai Nihonshi, a comprehensive history of Japan begun by his ancestor, Tokugawa Mitsukuni in the 17th century. However, in 1910, he was accepted into the 22nd class of the Imperial Japanese Army Academy, and was commissioned as Second lieutenant in the Imperial Japanese Army. He resigned his commission in 1914 citing health reasons, and went into the reserves in 1915.

From December 1911, Kuniyuki Tokugawa served as a member of the House of Peers of the Diet of Japan. On the completion of the Dai Nihonshi in 1929, he was awarded the title of koshaku (公爵, prince). On 25 June 1940, he accepted the post of honorary president of Japanese Red Cross Society. From 11 October 1944 to 19 June 1946, he served as the President of the House of Peers.

On his death in 1969, he was succeeded as head of the Mito branch of the Tokugawa clan by Kuninari Tokugawa.

Preceded by Tokugawa Atsuyoshi	Mito-Tokugawa family head 1898–1969	Succeeded by Kuninari Tokugawa
Political offices
Preceded by Yorinaga Matsudaira	President of the House of Peers; 1944–1946	Succeeded by Iemasa Tokugawa
