= Tokugawa Akitake =

Japanese noble (1853–1910)

Junior First Rank Tokugawa Akitake
- 徳川 昭武
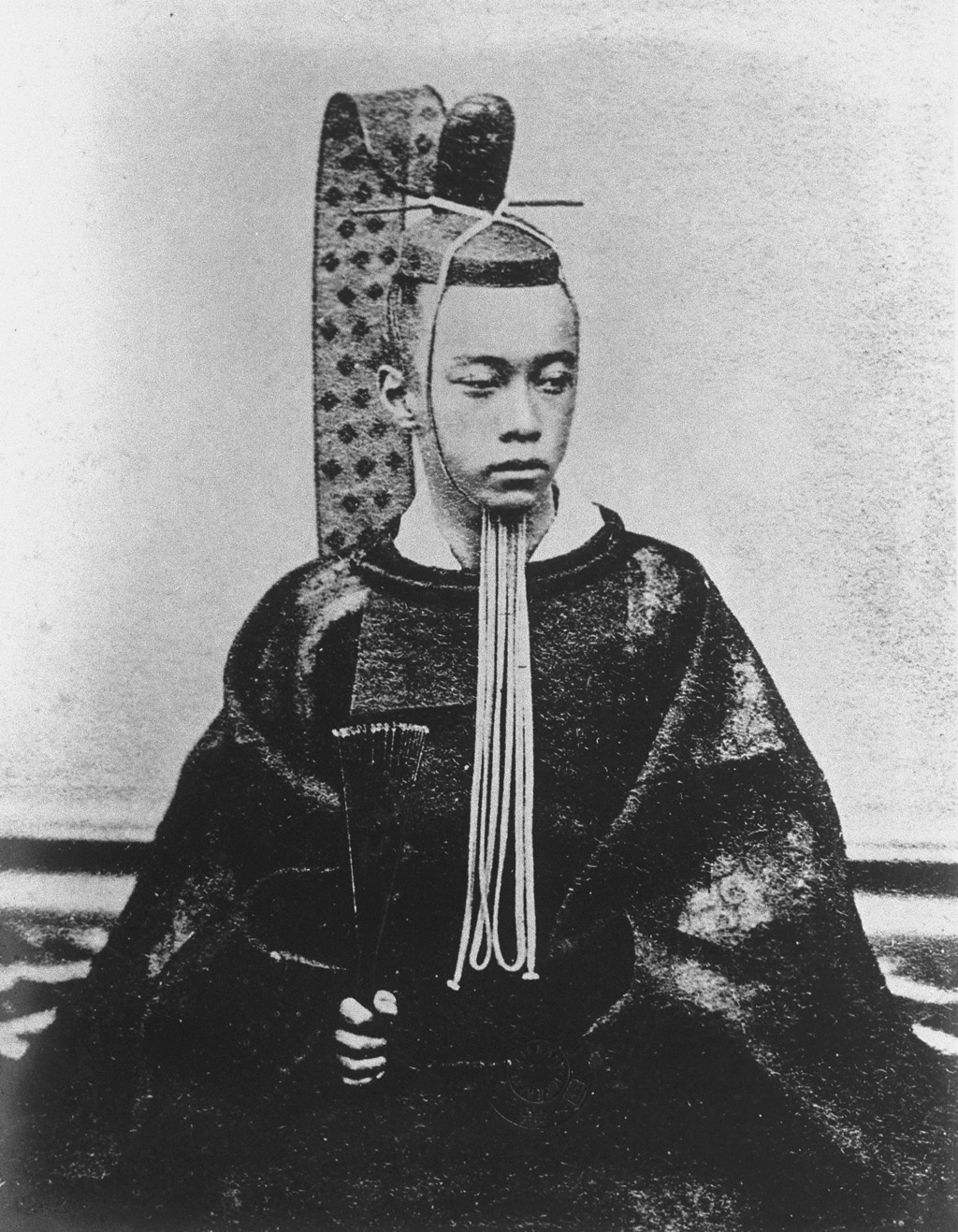

11th Daimyō of Mito
- In office 1868–1871
- Monarch: Emperor Meiji
- Preceded by: Tokugawa Yoshiatsu
- Succeeded by: Domain abolished

Personal details
- Born: October 26, 1853 Edo, Japan
- Died: July 3, 1910 (aged 56) Tokyo, Japan
- Parent: Tokugawa Nariaki (father)

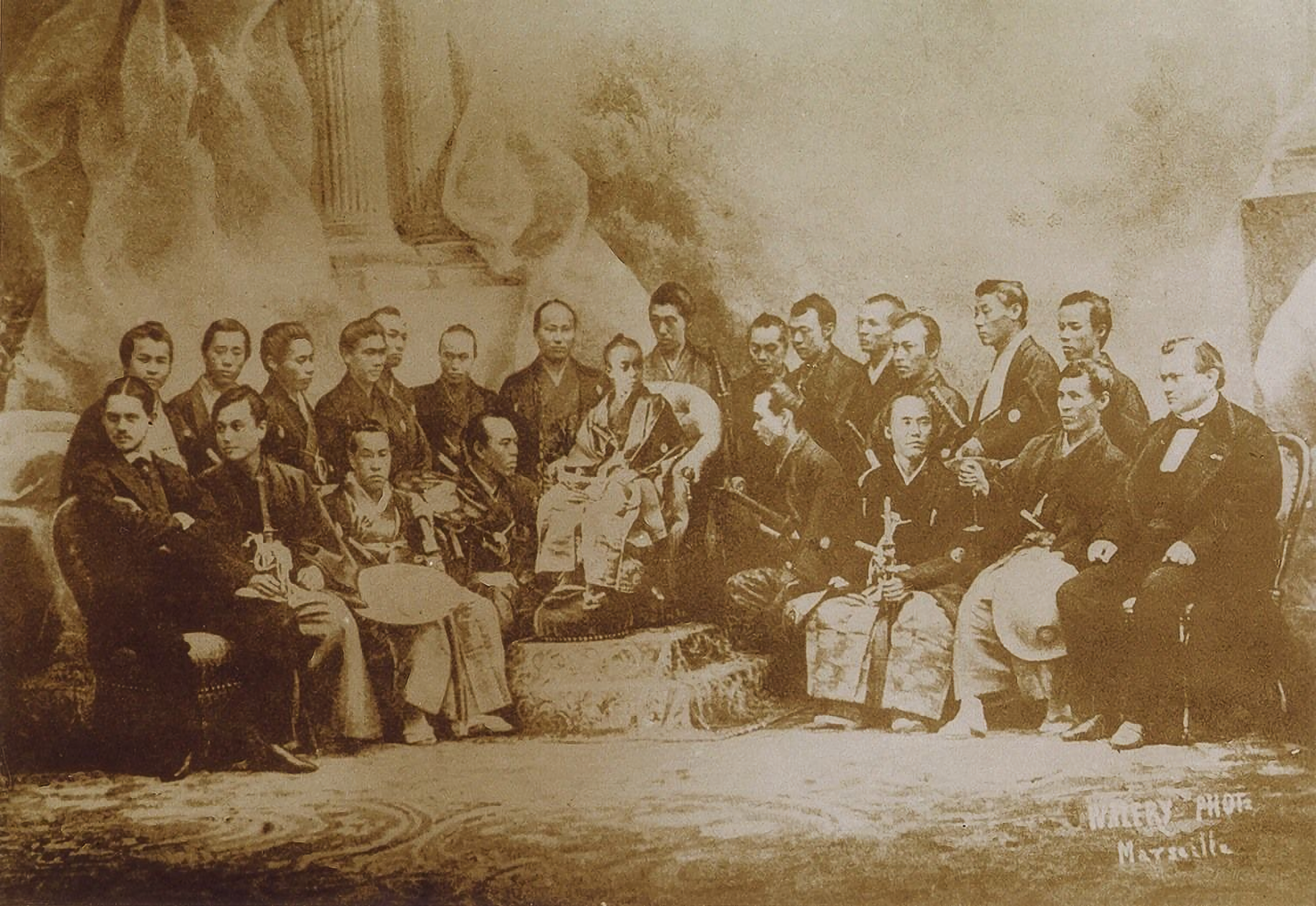
The Japanese delegation to the Exposition Universelle with young Tokugawa Akitake on an armchair (c. 1867)

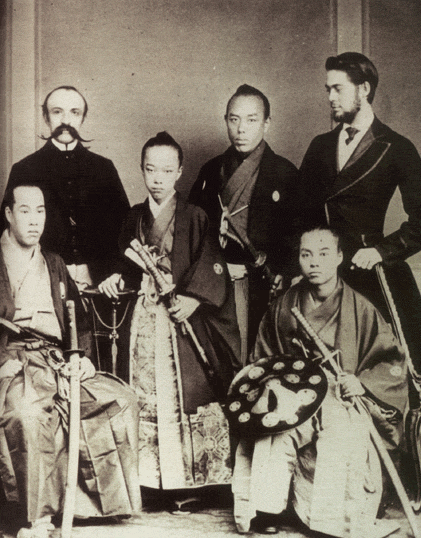
Tokugawa Akitake (center left) in Belgium (c. 1868)

Tokugawa Akitake (徳川 昭武; October 26, 1853 – July 3, 1910) was the younger half-brother of the last Tokugawa shōgun, Tokugawa Yoshinobu, and final daimyō of Mito Domain. He represented the Tokugawa shogunate at the courts of several European powers during the final days of Bakumatsu period Japan.

== Biography ==
=== Early life ===
Tokugawa Akitake was born as Matsudaira Yohachimaro (松平 余八麿), the 18th son of Tokugawa Nariaki, at the Mito Domain's secondary Edo residence in Komagome in 1853, the same year of the Perry Expedition to Japan. Due to concerns of safety, he was moved to Mito Domain at the age of six months, and returned to Edo in 1863. The same year, he was sent to Kyoto as a figurehead representative of Mito Domain, due to the illness (and death in 1864) of his elder half brother Matsudaira Akikuni. Kyoto was in a very disturbed situation at the time, with pro-shogunate forces battling pro-Sonnō jōi rōnin and samurai from anti-shogunate western domains in the streets and at the Kinmon Incident, and he was forced to change residences frequently for safety. On the death of the 14th shōgun, Tokugawa Iemochi in 1866, he was recalled to Edo, and his name was changed from Matsudaira Akinori (松平 昭徳) to Tokugawa Akitake. In 1867, he was proclaimed head of the Shimizu-Tokugawa clan, one of the Gosankyō branches of the Tokugawa who were permitted to rise to the position of shōgun.

=== Diplomatic career ===
In late 1866, aged only 14 years, Tokugawa Akitake was designated as special emissary to France and led the Japanese delegation to the 1867 World Fair in Paris, where Japan had a pavilion Shibusawa Eiichi was appointed to accountant and secretary for Tokugawa Akitake in 1866 and assigned to join the delegation to Paris. He kept concise diary during the mission. The mission left Yokohama on January 11, 1867, and reached Paris two months later. The fair aroused considerable interest in Europe, and allowed many visitors to come in contact with Japanese art and techniques for the first time.

His mission to meet Napoleon III was successful, and when the fair was ended, Tokugawa Akitake met with William III of the Netherlands, Victor Emmanuel II of Italy, and Queen Victoria during the travel to several European countries. With Leopold II of Belgium, he inspected troops wearing a traditional Japanese battle surcoat which was photographed at that occasion. He came back to France and pursued studies. On hearing of the start of the Boshin War, he made emergency plans to return to Japan but Tokugawa Akitake was ordered to remain in France by shōgun Tokugawa Yoshinobu, and it was not until August 1868 that he received word from the new Meiji government authorizing his return to Japan. He made a final tour of France, visiting Normandy, the Loire river valley and Nantes, and on his return to Paris, received another letter from the Meiji government advising of the death of his half-brother Tokugawa Yoshiatsu and ordering him to assume the post of daimyō to assure the stability of Mito Domain. He departed from Marseille in December 1868.

=== Meiji period ===
Tokugawa Akitake succeeded Tokugawa Yoshiatsu to become the 11th head of the Mito Tokugawa clan on his return to Japan. However, the title of daimyō was officially abolished in 1869, and he continued at Mito as domain governor. His request for land development in Hokkaido to resettle ex-samurai from the domain was granted on August 17, 1869, and he was assigned lands in Tomamae-gun, Teshio-gun, Kamikawa-gun, Nakagawa-gun in Teshio no kuni along with Rishiri-gun in Kitami no kuni. With the abolition of the han system in 1871, he was required by the government to leave in Mito and to live in Tokyo. He relocated to the former shimoyashiki secondary residence of the Mito Clan located in Mukōjima.

Tokugawa Akitake was appointed a second lieutenant in Imperial Japanese Army in 1875, and served as an instructor during the early days of the Imperial Japanese Army Toyama School. He was married to Nakanoin Eiko the same year. In 1876, he was sent to the United States, as the emissary in charge of the Japanese exhibition at the 1876 World Fair in Philadelphia. He then returned to France again for studies accompanied with his brother Tsuchiya Shigenao and half-brother Matsudaira Nobunori. During his eight-year absence from France, the Second French Empire had been replaced by the French Third Republic. From 1881, he ended his studies at the École Polytechnique, but before returning to Japan, he made a tour of Germany, Austria, Switzerland, Italy and Belgium together with his half-nephew Tokugawa Atsuyoshi, the son of the ex-shōgun Tokugawa Yoshinobu.

=== Heirs ===
In 1883, his wife Eiko died soon after giving birth to a daughter. Tokugawa Akitake retired and moved to the clan's Tojōtei villa in Matsudo, Chiba Prefecture, in 1884. Lacking an heir, he adopted Tokugawa Atsuyoshi as his successor to the Mito Tokugawa line. Atsuyoshi died at the age of 44 in 1898. Atsuyoshi's son Tokugawa Kuniyuki was 11 years old at that time, and became the 13th head of the Mito Tokugawa under Akitake's tutelage.

However, Akitake subsequently had a son, Tokugawa Takesada, who was born to a concubine in 1888. Takesada was made a viscount (shishaku) under the kazoku peerage system in 1892 and founded the separate Matsudo Tokugawa line.

In 1903, Tokugawa Akitake was awarded the Order of the Sacred Treasure, 2nd class. He died at Koumetei mansion in 1910.

== Family ==
- Father: Tokugawa Nariaki
- Mother: Madenokoji Toshiko
- Wife: Eiko, daughter of Nakanoin Michitomi
- Concubine: Oyae no Kata
- Children:
  - Akiko married Yorinaga Matsudaira by Eiko
  - Masako married Mori Motofuji by Oyae
  - Takemaro (died in womb) by Oyae
  - Tokugawa Takesada (1888–1957) by Oyae
  - Naoko married Narimitsu Matsudaira by Oyae
  - Atsuko married Kyogoku Takaosa by Oyae
  - Takeomaro (died in womb) by Oyae

== Honours ==
From the Japanese Wikipedia

=== Honours ===
- Grand Cordon of the Order of the Sacred Treasure (1910; posthumous) (Second Class: 1903)

=== Order of precedence ===
- Junior fifth rank (1863)
- Junior fourth rank (1866)
- Third rank (1881)
- Second rank (1897)
- Senior second rank (1902)
- First rank (1910; posthumous)

== See also ==
- France–Japan relations (19th century)
