= Tokugawa Nariaki =

Japanese daimyo (1800–1860)

Senior First Rank Tokugawa Nariaki
- 徳川 斉昭
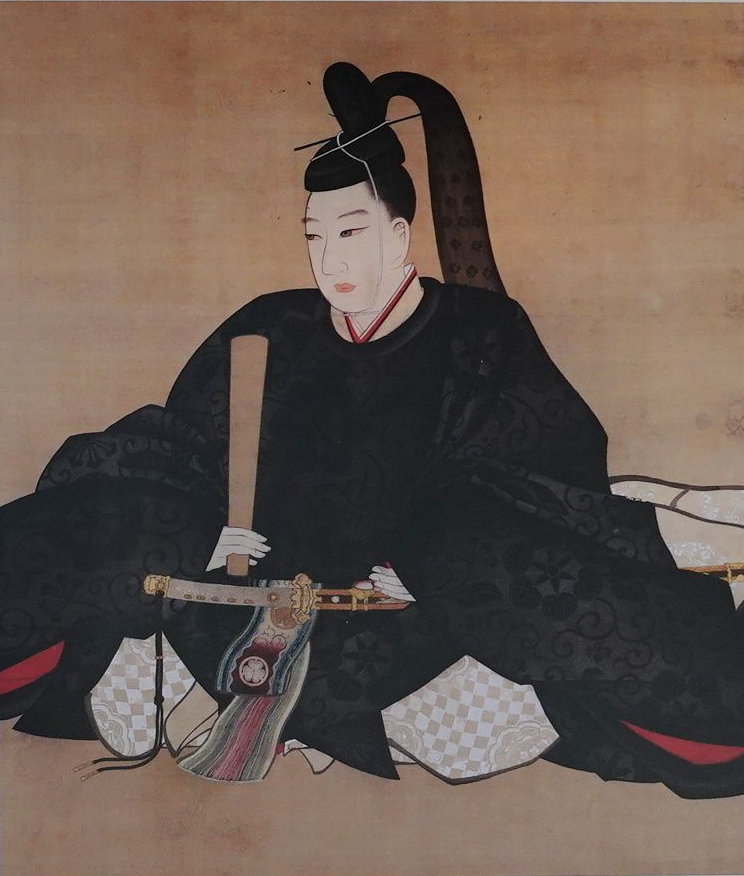

9th Lord of Mito
- In office 1829–1844
- Preceded by: Tokugawa Narinobu
- Succeeded by: Tokugawa Yoshiatsu

Personal details
- Born: April 4, 1800
- Died: September 29, 1860 (aged 60)
- Spouse: Arisugawa Yoshiko (1804–1893)
- Children: several, including; Tokugawa Yoshinobu; Tokugawa Akitake; Matsudaira Tadakazu; Matsudaira Nobunori
- Parents: Tokugawa Harutoshi (father); Toyama-dono (mother)

Tokugawa Nariaki (徳川 斉昭, April 4, 1800 – September 29, 1860) was a Japanese daimyō who ruled the Mito Domain (now Ibaraki Prefecture) and contributed to the rise of nationalism and the Meiji Restoration.

== Biography ==
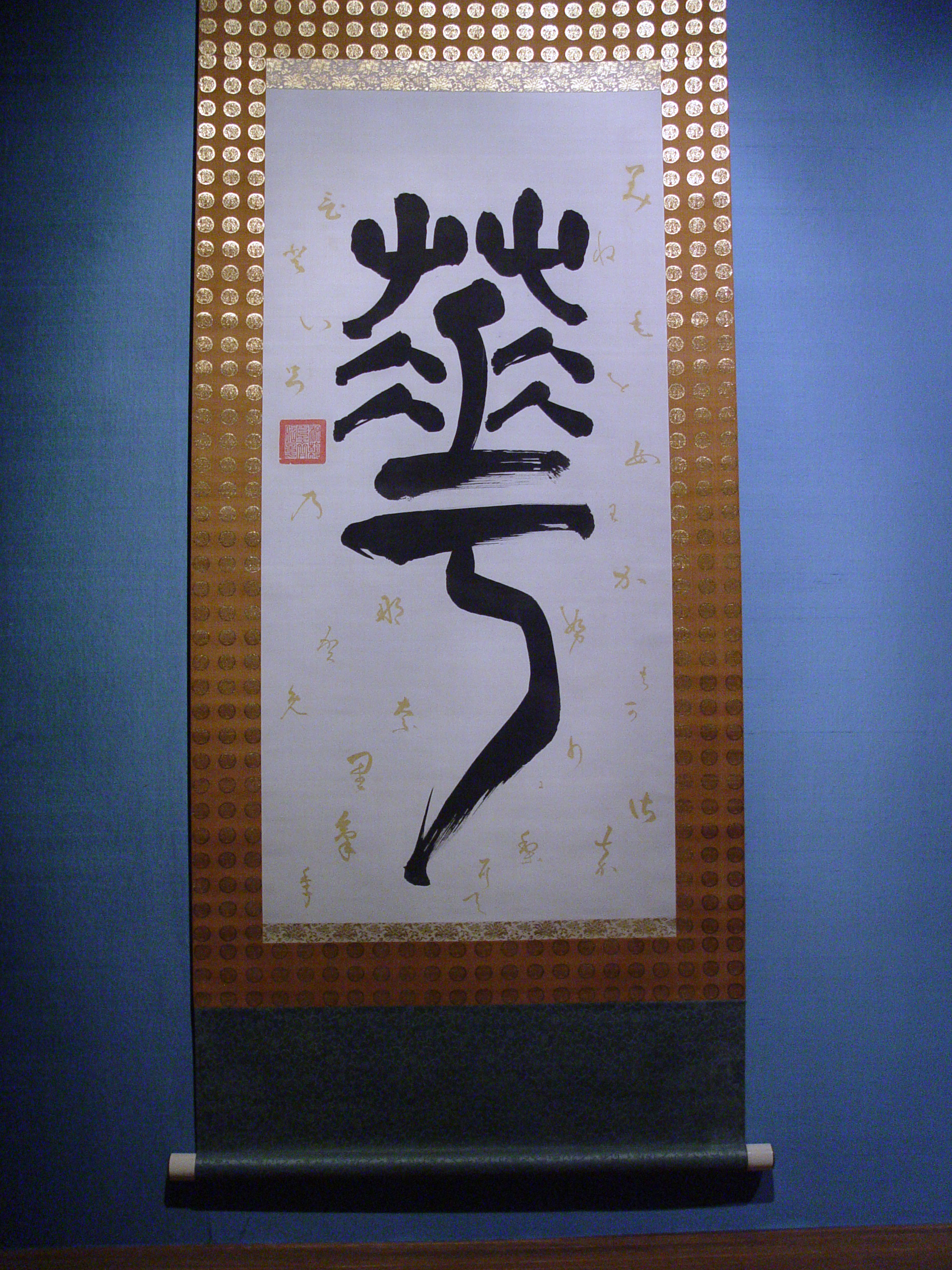
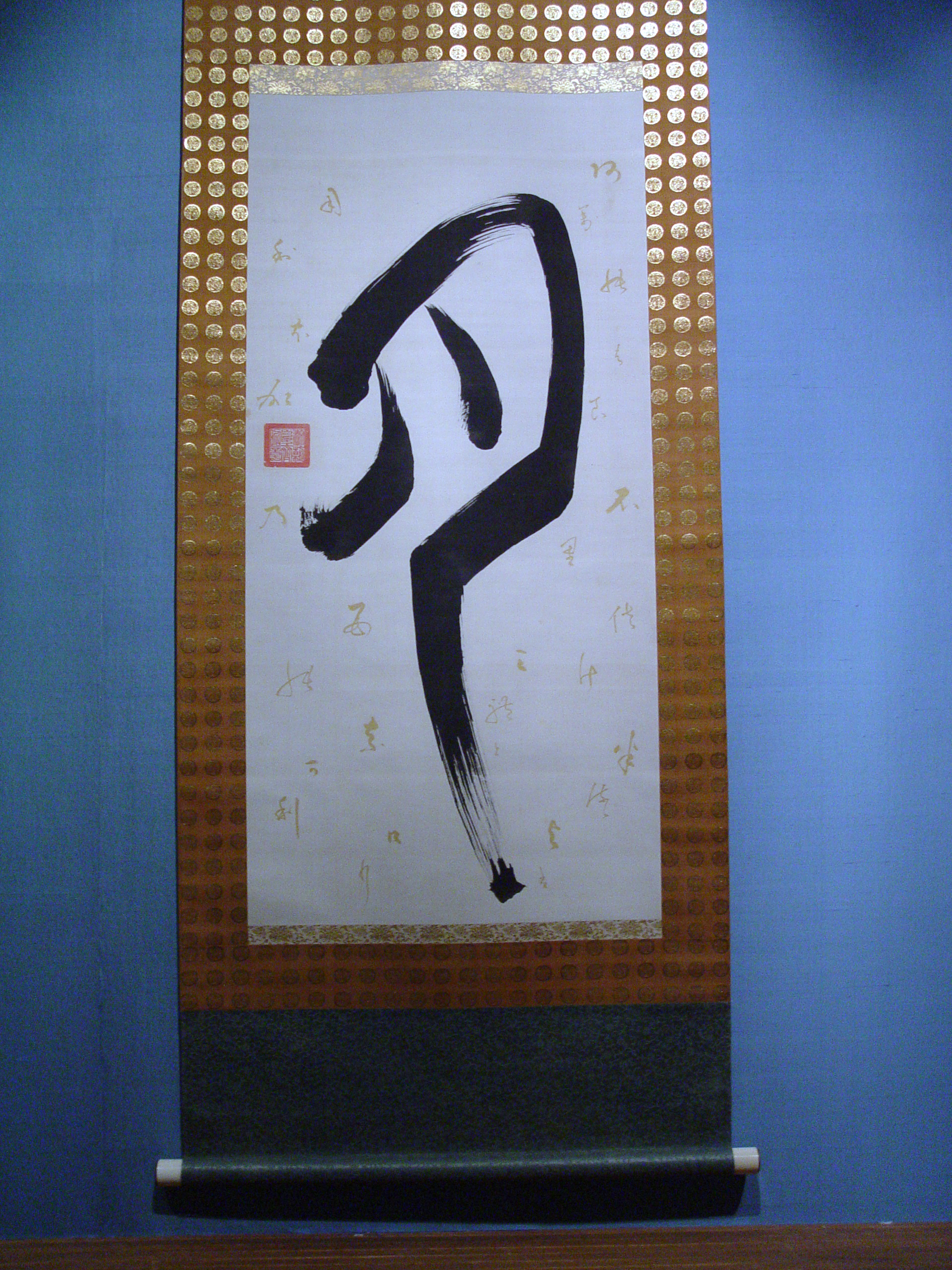
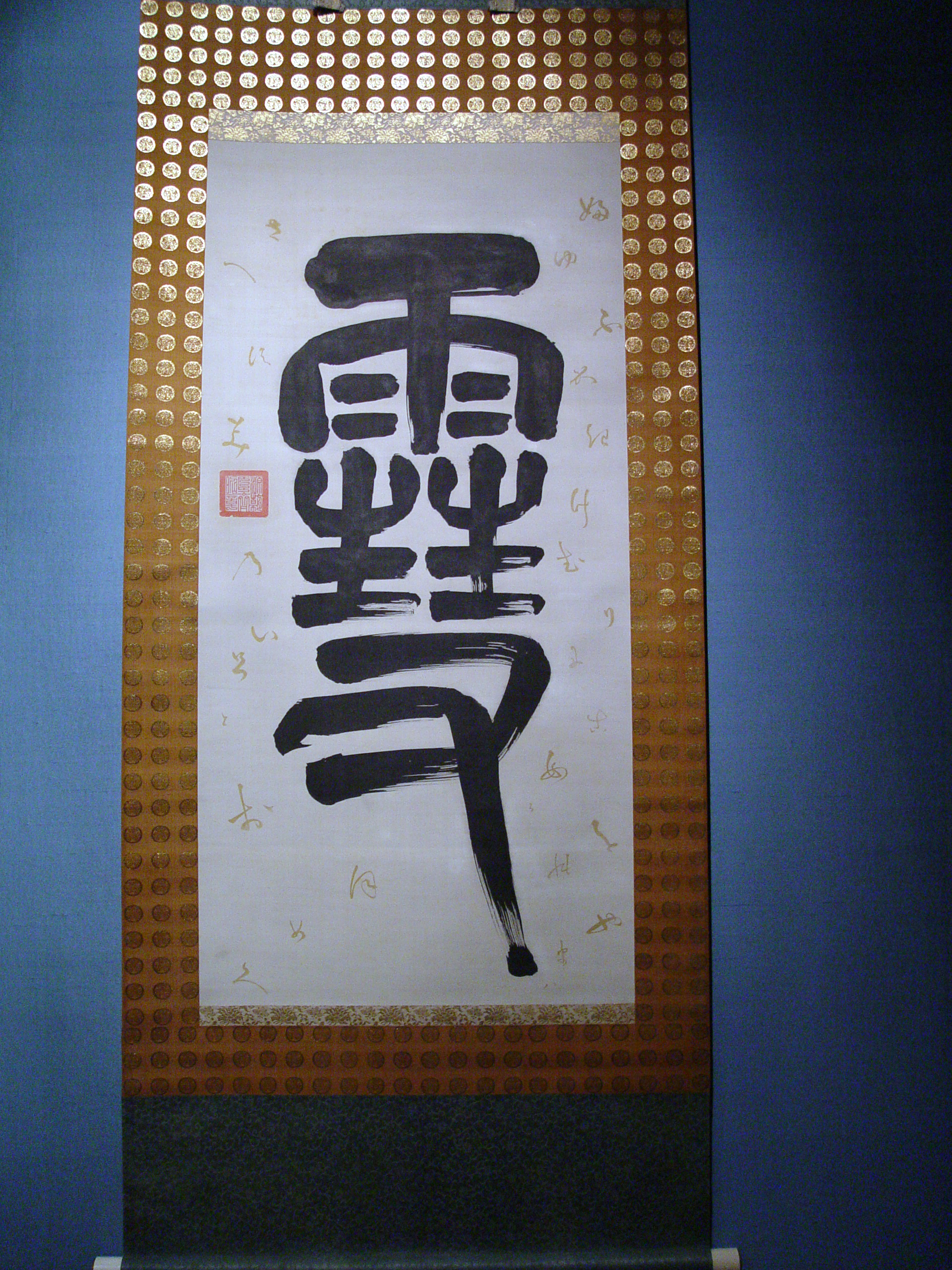
Calligraphy of (L-to-R) "flower", "moon", and "snow" by Tokugawa Nariaki

=== Clan leader ===
Nariaki was the 3rd son of Tokugawa Harutoshi, the seventh-generation daimyō of Mito. The family headship first passed to Harutoshi's eldest son Narinobu, before being passed on to Nariaki in 1829. Nariaki was also leader of the Jōi (expel the barbarian) party and made a Bakufu adviser on national defence. His childhood name was Torasaburo (虎三郎) later changed to Keisaburo (敬三郎).

=== Bakufu official ===
Nariaki was put in charge of Bakufu efforts to defend the country against encroaching foreigners. His own view was that the bakufu should strengthen its military and fight the foreigners, and was at odds with Ii Naosuke on the issue. He was pro-emperor and favored imperial restoration. Nariaki also greatly expanded the Mitogaku school established by Tokugawa Mitsukuni. He wrote a document entitled "Japan, Reject the Westerners" in 1853. in this document, he stated ten reasons why Japan should stay isolated from the rest of the world. He said that the Japanese people had a choice between war and peace, but clearly to him, the Japanese people should choose war so that Westerners would not intrude into Japan's affairs.

Nariaki was significantly influenced by the Kokugaku school. Ōkuni Takamasa, a student of Hirata Atsutane attempted to persuade him to combine ritual with technology in order to protect Japan's borders and expand Japan as an empire. This depended on reinvigorating the Japanese "national spirit". Ōkuni and Nariaki therefore laid some foundations for the Meiji restoration as well as the development of State Shinto.

Nariaki and Naosuke fought over who would succeed the Shōgun Iesada, with Nariaki championing his son Yoshinobu. Naosuke, who eventually prevailed, favored the Wakayama Domain daimyo Tokugawa Yoshitomi.

=== Legacy ===
In 1841, Nariaki built Kairaku-en, a garden whose fame lasts to this day.

Nariaki was placed under house arrest twice, once in 1844 and a second time as part of the Ansei Purge in 1858 in favor of his son Yoshiatsu, and died of a heart attack in 1860, at age 60.

Three of the leading figures of the 1860s were in fact natural brothers, all being sons of Nariaki: Hitotsubashi Yoshinobu, who became the 15th and last shōgun as Tokugawa Yoshinobu in 1866; Tokugawa Yoshiatsu of Mito; and Ikeda Yoshinori of Inaba (Tottori).

== Family ==
- Father: Tokugawa Harutoshi
- Mother: Toyama-dono
- Wife: Arisugawa Yoshiko (1804–1893)
  - 1st Son: Tokugawa Yoshiatsu (1832–1868)
  - 2nd Son: Jiromaro (1833–1834)
  - 5th Daughter: Mihime (1835–1835)
  - 7th Son: Tokugawa Yoshinobu
- Concubine: Harigawa-dono
  - 1st Daughter: Masahime (1822–1839)
  - 2nd Daughter: Iromotohime (1825–1826)
  - 3rd Daughter: Iwaihime (1827–1853) married Yamanobe Yoshimasa
- Concubine: Onao no Kata
  - 4th Daughter: Hirohime (1834–1835) b
  - 4th Son: Shiromaro (1835–1836)
  - 7th Daughter: Yohime (1837–1843)
  - 7th Son: Matsudaira Naoyoshi (1839–1862)
  - 8th Daughter: Ichiyohime (1840–1843)
  - Son: Matsudaira Takeakira (1842–1882) of Hamada Domain
  - 13th Son: Yosanmaro (1844–1844)
- Concubine: Sadako
  - 3rd Son: Saburomaro (1835–1837)
  - 6th Daughter: Matsuhime (1836–1903) married Nanbu Toshihisa
  - 5th Son: Ikeda Yoshinari (1837–1877) of Tottori Domain
  - 9th Son: Ikeda Mochimasa (1839–1899) of Okayama Domain
  - 9th Daughter: Takako (1841–1869) married Date Yoshikuni
  - 12th Son: Yonimaro (1844-1844)
- Concubine: Yanagihara-dono
  - 6th Son: Rokuromaro (1837–1838)
- Concubine: Toshiko
  - 12th Daughter: Seihime (1843–1844)
  - 11th son: Kitsuregawa Tsunauji (1844–1874) of Kitsuregawa Domain
- Concubine: Mutsuko
  - 14th Son: Matsudaira Akikuni (1849–1864)
  - 11th Daughter: Tokugawa Sadako (1850–1872) married Prince Arisugawa Taruhito
  - 17th Son: Tsuchiya Shigenao (1854–1904) of Tsuchiura Domain
  - 18th Son: Tokugawa Akitake
  - 20th Son: Tatsumoro (1856–1858)
  - 22nd Son: Matsudaira Yoriyuki (1858–1873) of Moriyama Domain
- Concubine: Tokuko
  - 15th Son: Yogomaro (1849-1849)
  - 16th Son: Matsudaira Tadakazu
  - 12th Daughter: Aihime (1852–1914) married Inoue Masayori
  - 21st Son: Ichimaru (1856–1856)
- Concubine: Michiko
  - 13th Daughter: Hisahime (1853-1853)
- Concubine: Etsuko
  - 19th Son: Matsudaira Nobunori
  - 14th Daughter: Yasuhime (1857–1859)
  - 15th Daughter: Masahime (1858–1873)

== Works ==
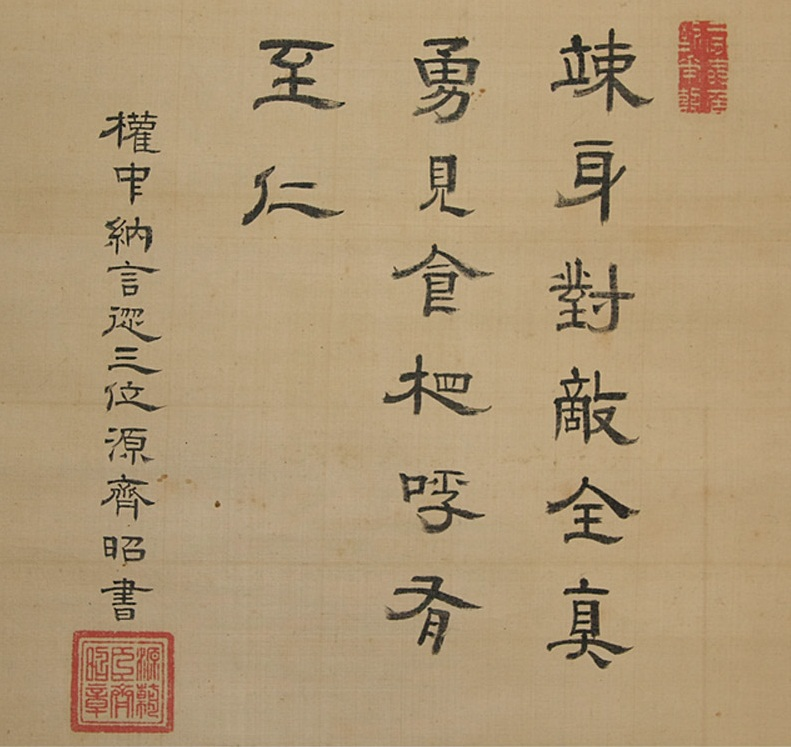
Writing by Tokugawa Nariaki

Published posthumously:

- Kōdōkan ki 弘道館記 (1937). Ed. by Meiji Seitoku Kinen Gakkai 明治聖德記念學會. Tokyo: Meiji Seitoku Kinen Gakkai 明治聖德記念學會.
- Meikun ippanshō 明君一斑抄 (1910–1911). Ed. by Kurokawa Mamichi 黒川真道. Tokyo: Dōbunkan 同文館.

== Honours ==
- Senior First Rank (June 27, 1903; posthumous)

== See also ==
- Ansei Purge

Royal titles
Preceded by Tokugawa Narinobu	Daimyō of Mito; 1829–1844	Succeeded by Tokugawa Yoshiatsu
