= House of Peers (Japan) =

Upper house of the legislature of Imperial Japan (Imperial Diet)

House of Peers 貴族院 Kizoku-in
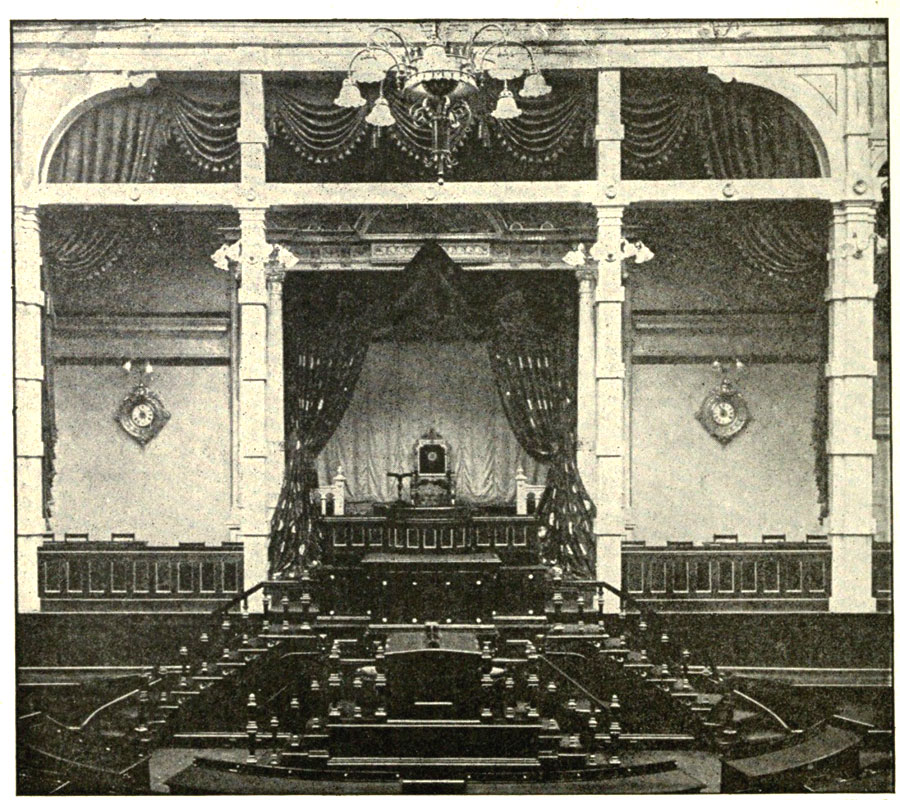
- House of Peers, 1915

Type
- Type: Upper house

History
- Established: 6 March 1871
- Disbanded: 2 May 1947
- Succeeded by: House of Councillors

Structure
- Seats: 251 (1889); 409 (at peak, 1938); 373 (1947)
- Political groups: House of Peers factions in 1947: Kenkyūkai (142); Kōseikai (64); Kōyū kurabu (42); Dōseikai (33); Kayōkai (32); Dōwakai (30); Club of Independents (22); Unaffiliated (8)

Elections
- Last election: 1946 House of Peers election

Meeting place
- National Diet Building, Tokyo

Constitution
- Meiji Constitution

The House of Peers (貴族院, Kizoku-in) was the upper house of the Imperial Diet as mandated under the Constitution of the Empire of Japan (in effect from 11 February 1889 to 3 May 1947).

== Background ==
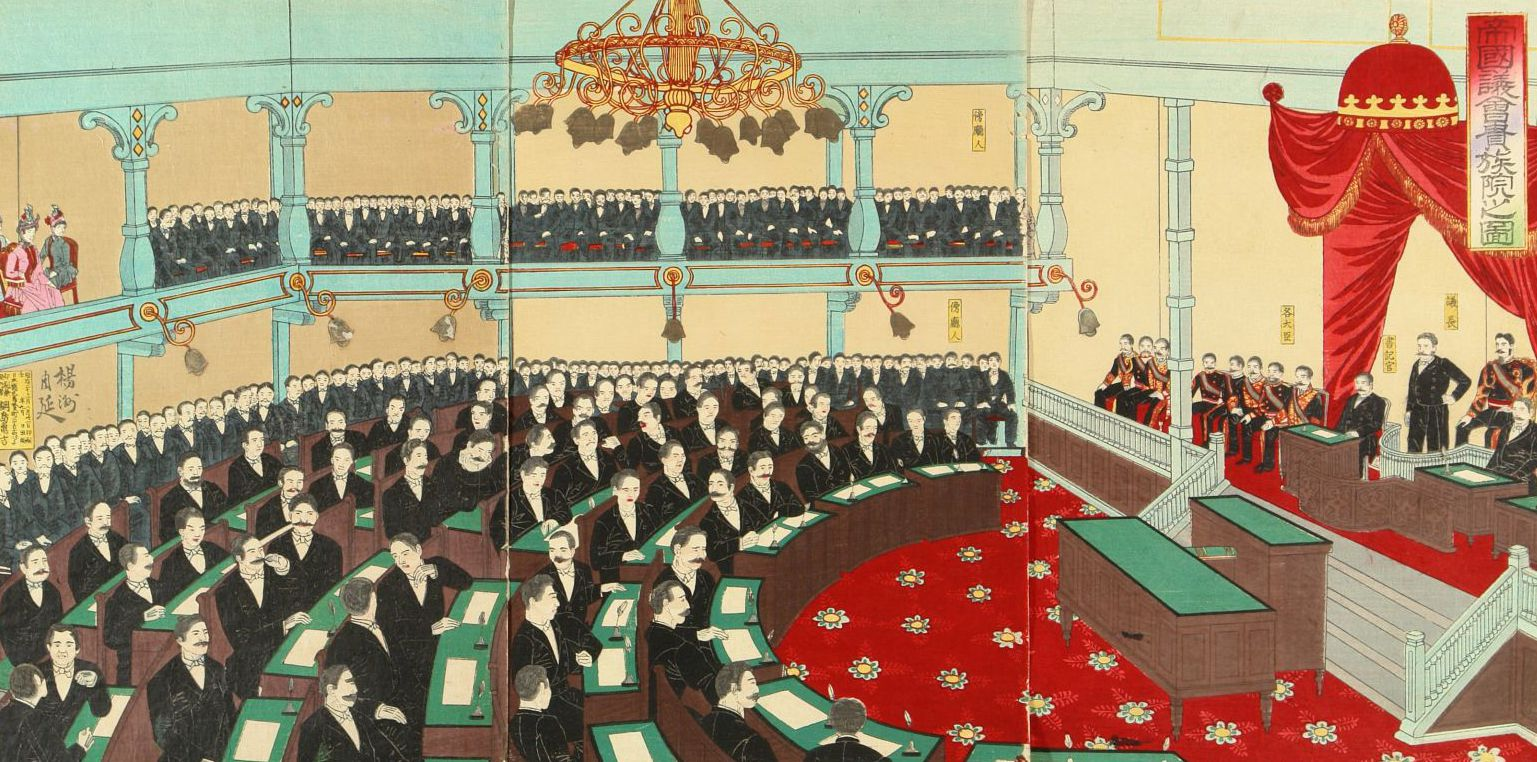
Emperor Meiji in a formal session of the House of Peers. Ukiyo-e woodblock print by Yōshū Chikanobu, 1890

In 1869, under the new Meiji government, a Japanese peerage was created by an Imperial decree merging the former court nobility (kuge) and former feudal lords (daimyos) into a single new aristocratic class called the kazoku. A second imperial ordinance in 1884 grouped the kazoku into five ranks equivalent to the European aristocrats: prince (equivalent to a European duke), marquess, count, viscount, and baron. Although this grouping idea was taken from the European peerage, the Japanese titles were taken from Chinese and based on the ancient feudal system in China. Itō Hirobumi and the other Meiji leaders deliberately modeled the chamber on the British House of Lords, as a counterweight to the popularly elected House of Representatives (Shūgiin).

== Establishment ==
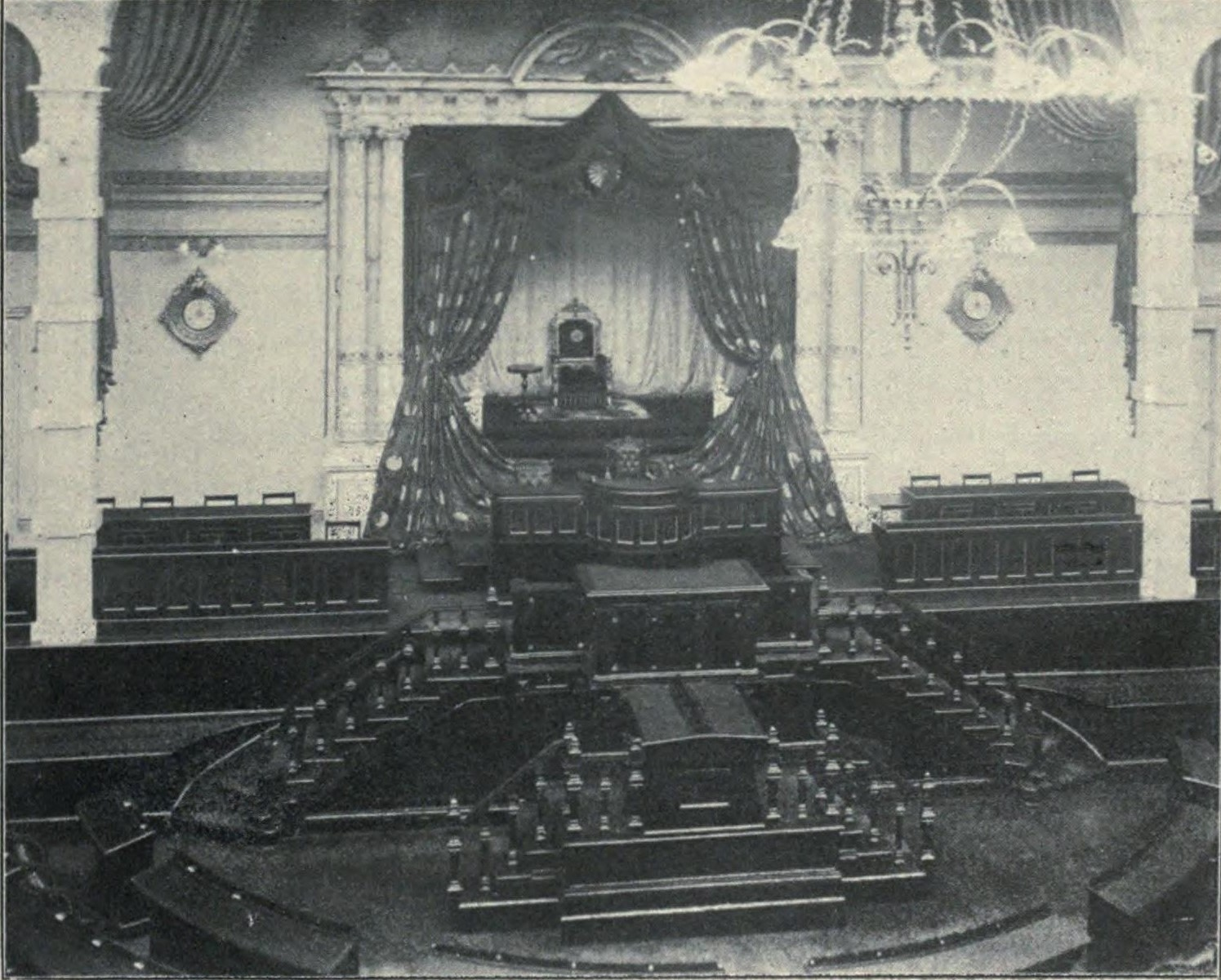
The House of Peers in 1910

In 1889, the House of Peers Ordinance established the House of Peers and its composition. For the first session of the Imperial Diet (November 1890–March 1891), there were 145 hereditary members and 106 imperial appointees and high taxpayers, for a total of 251 members. In the 1920s, four new peers elected by the Japan Imperial Academy were added, and the number of peers elected by the top taxpayers of each prefecture was increased from 47 to 66 as some prefectures now elected two members. Inversely, the minimum age for hereditary (dukes and marquesses) and mutually elected (counts, viscounts and barons) noble peers was increased to 30, slightly reducing their number. By 1938, membership reached 409 seats. After the addition of seats for the imperial colonies of Chōsen (Korea) and Taiwan (Formosa) during the last stages of WWII, it stood at 418 at the beginning of the 89th Imperial Diet in November 1945, briefly before General Douglas MacArthur's "purge" barred many members from public office. In 1947, during its 92nd and final session, the number of members was 373.

== Composition ==
After revisions to the Ordinance, notably in 1925, the House of Peers comprised:

- The crown prince (Kōtaishi) and the imperial grandson (Kōtaison) and heir presumptive from the age of 18, with the term of office for life.
- All imperial princes (shinnō) and lesser princes of the imperial blood (ō) over the age of 20, with the term of office for life.
- All princes, dukes and marquesses over the age of 25 (raised to 30 in 1925), with the term of office for life.
- 18 counts, 66 viscounts and 66 barons over the age of 25 (raised to 30 in 1925), for seven-year terms.
- 125 distinguished persons over the age of 30 nominated by the Emperor in consultation with the Cabinet, with the term of office for life.
- 4 members of the Imperial Academy over the age of 30, elected by the academicians and nominated by the Emperor, for seven-year terms.
- 66 elected representatives of the 6,000 highest taxpayers, over the age of 30 and for seven-year terms.

== Postwar dissolution ==
After World War II, the United States occupied Japan and undertook widespread structural changes with the goal of democratization and demilitarization, which included extensive land reform that stripped the nobility of their land and therefore a major source of income. A new constitution was also written by the occupiers, the current Constitution of Japan, in effect from 3 May 1947, which required the mostly unelected House of Peers be replaced by an elected House of Councillors.

== Leadership ==
=== Presidents ===
| No. | Portrait | Name (Birth–Death) | Faction | Tenure | | |
| No. | Portrait | Name (Birth–Death) | Faction | Took office | Left office | Duration |
|---|---|---|---|---|---|---|
| 1 | | Count; Itō Hirobumi (1841–1909) | None | 24 October 1890 | 20 July 1891 | 269 days |
| 2 | | Marquess; Hachisuka Mochiaki (1846–1918) | None | 20 July 1891 | 3 October 1896 | 5 years, 75 days |
| 3 | | Prince; Konoe Atsumaro (1863–1904) | Sanyōkai | 3 October 1896 | 4 December 1903 | 7 years, 62 days |
| 4 | | Prince; Tokugawa Iesato (1863–1940) | Kayōkai | 4 December 1903 | 9 June 1933 | 29 years, 187 days |
| 5 | | Prince; Fumimaro Konoe (1891–1945) | Kayōkai | 9 June 1933 | 17 June 1937 | 4 years, 8 days |
| 6 | | Count; Yorinaga Matsudaira (1874–1944) | Kenkyūkai | 17 June 1937 | 13 September 1944 | 7 years, 88 days |
| 7 | | Prince; Tokugawa Kuniyuki (1886–1969) | Kayōkai | 11 October 1944 | 19 June 1946 | 1 year, 251 days |
| 8 | | Prince; Tokugawa Iemasa (1884–1963) | Kayōkai | 19 June 1946 | 2 May 1947 | 317 days |

=== Vice presidents ===
| No. | Portrait | Name (Birth–Death) | Faction | Tenure | | |
| No. | Portrait | Name (Birth–Death) | Faction | Took office | Left office | Duration |
|---|---|---|---|---|---|---|
| 1 | | Count; Higashikuze Michitomi (1834–1912) | None | 24 October 1890 | 1 August 1891 | 281 days |
| 2 | | Hosokawa Junjirō (1834–1923) | None | 30 September 1891 | 13 November 1893 | 2 years, 44 days |
| 3 | | Marquis; Saionji Kinmochi (1849–1940) | None | 13 November 1893 | 12 May 1894 | 180 days |
| 4 | | Marquis; Kuroda Nagashige (1867–1939) | Kenkyūkai | 6 October 1894 | 16 January 1924 | 29 years, 102 days |
| 5 | | Marquis; Hachisuka Masaaki (1871–1932) | Kenkyūkai | 16 January 1924 | 16 January 1931 | 7 years |
| 6 | | Prince; Fumimaro Konoe (1891–1945) | Kayōkai | 16 January 1931 | 9 June 1933 | 2 years, 144 days |
| 7 | | Count; Yorinaga Matsudaira (1874–1944) | Kenkyūkai | 9 June 1933 | 19 June 1937 | 4 years, 10 days |
| 8 | | Marquis; Sasaki Yukitada (1893–1975) | Kayōkai | 19 June 1937 | 21 October 1944 | 7 years, 124 days |
| 9 | | Count; Sakai Tadamasa (1893–1971) | Kenkyūkai | 21 October 1944 | 17 December 1945 | 1 year, 57 days |
| 10 | | Count; Tokugawa Muneyoshi (1897–1989) | Kenkyūkai | 19 June 1946 | 2 May 1947 | 317 days |

== See also ==
- Westminster System
- Prussian House of Lords
- House of Ariki
- Chamber of Peers
- Chamber of Fasces and Corporations
- Reichstag (Nazi Germany)
- Gentry assembly
- Assembly of Notables
- The Seanad
- Tricameral Parliament
