= Tokugawa Yorifusa =

Japanese daimyō (1603–1661)

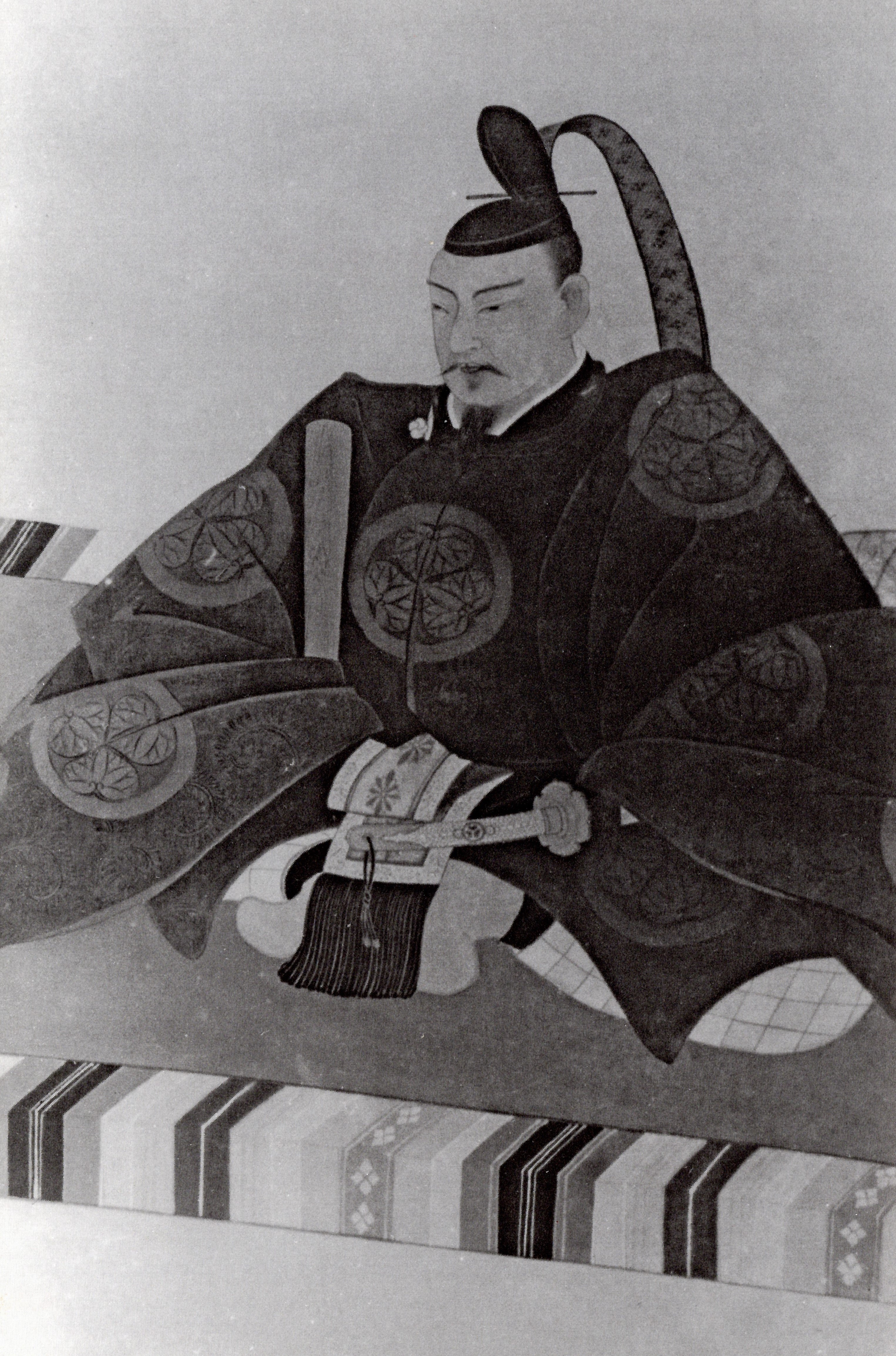
Tokugawa Yorifusa

Tokugawa Yorifusa (徳川 頼房; September 15, 1603 – August 23, 1661), also known as Mito Yorifusa, was a Japanese daimyō of the early Edo period.

== Biography ==
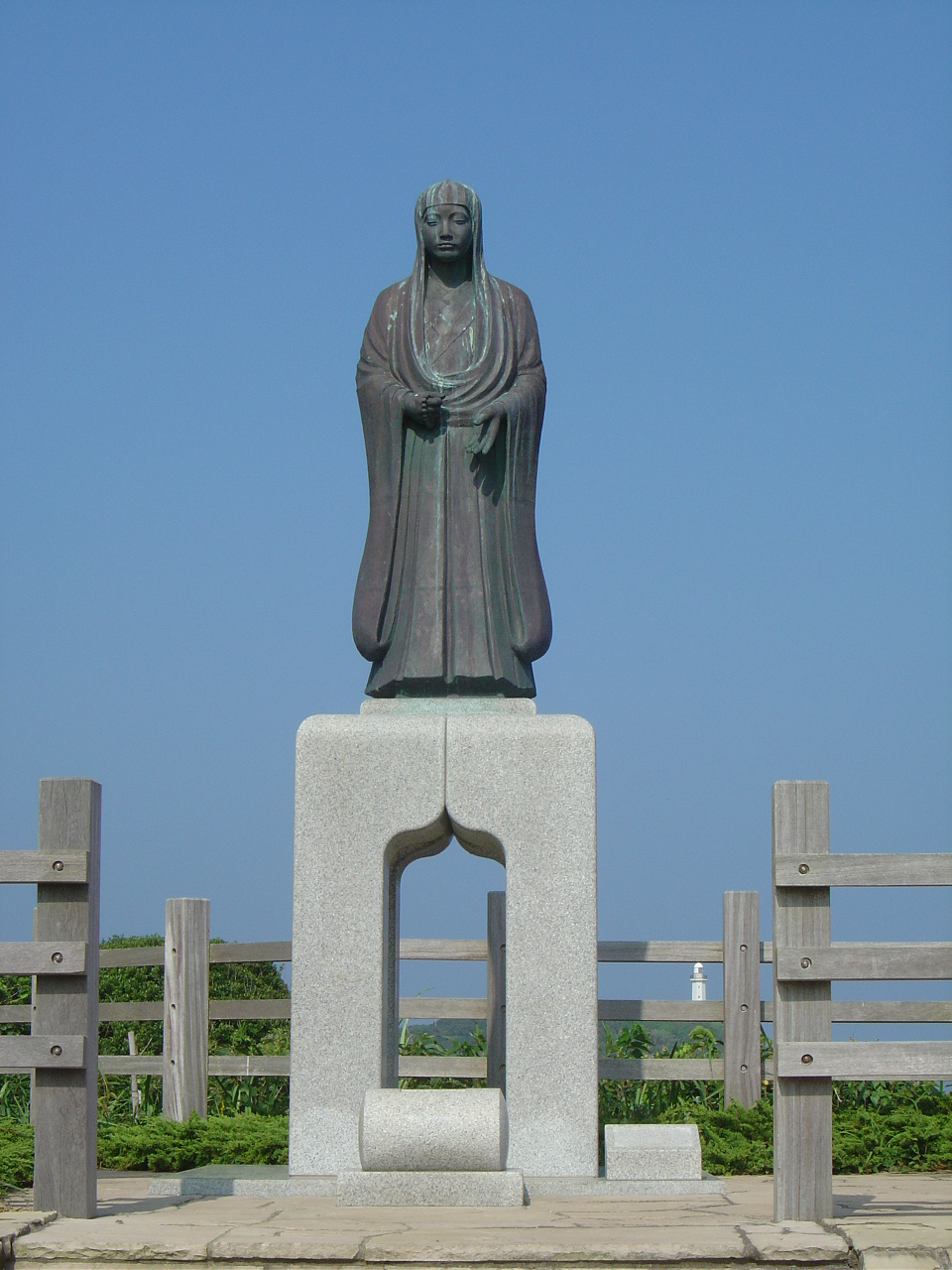
Kageyama-dono, mother of Yorinobu and Yorifusa.

Known in his childhood as Tsuruchiyomaru (鶴千代丸), he was the eleventh son of Tokugawa Ieyasu, the first Tokugawa shogun with his concubine, Kageyama-dono later adopted as Okaji no Kata's son after his younger sister, Ichihime died. Yorifusa was first enfeoffed in the Shimotsuma domain (100,000 koku) from 1606 to 1609, before being transferred to Mito (Hitachi Province, 350,000 koku) in 1610, thereby founding the Mito branch of the Tokugawa house (the junior branch of the gosanke). A holder of the junior 3rd court rank (jusanmi), Yorifusa held the title of chūnagon (middle counselor), both of which he received in 1627.

== Family ==
- Father: Tokugawa Ieyasu
- Mother: Kageyama-dono (1580–1653) later Yoju-in
- Adopted Mother: Okaji no Kata
- Wife, Concubine, Children:
  - Concubine: Hisa later Kyushoin (1604-1662), daughter of Tani Shigenori
    - Matsudaira Yorishige
    - Tokugawa Mitsukuni
  - Concubine: Okatsu no Kata later Enrin-in, daughter of Sasaki Masakatsu
    - Michiko (1624-1664) betrothed to Matsudono Michiaki
    - Kamemaru (1625-1628)
    - Man (1627-1689) married Ota Sukemasa
    - Kiku (1628-1706) married Matsudaira Yasuhiro
    - Matsudaira Yoritomo (1629-1693)
    - Sen (1635-1681) married Maki Kagenobu
    - Matsu
    - Matsudaira Yorikatsu (1630-1697)
  - Concubine: Oya no Kata later Jokoin
    - Kiihime (1627-1631)
    - Kohime (1628-1717)
    - Matsudaira Yoritaka (1629-1707)
    - Matsudaira Yoriyuki (1631-1717)
    - Ritsu (1632-1711) married Yamanobe Yoshikata
    - Suzuki Shigeyoshi (1634-1668)
  - Concubine: Kitsuke later Gyokuho-in
    - Oohime (1627-1656) married Maeda Mitsutaka
  - Concubine: Tama later Shonshin'in daughter of Banzo Sokenjikyozen
    - Matsudaira Yoritoshi (1630-1674)
  - Concubine: Aii later Tsuji'in daughter of Tanya Yorifusa
    - Matsudaira Yoriyuki (1631-1664)
    - Matsudaira Fusaji (1633-1682)
  - Concubine: Toshi later Choshoin
    - Furi (1633-1667) married Honda Masatoshi
    - Take (1636-1637)
    - Ume (1638-1697) married Utsunomiya Takatsuna
  - Concubine: Nana later Shinje-in daughter of Oida Yasunao
    - Inu (1634-1675) married Hosokawa Tsunatoshi
    - Ichi (1639-1690) married Sakai Tadaharu
  - Concubine: Iku later Kashin-in daughter of Takano Kiyohyou
    - Kuma (1649-1709) married Ito Tomotsugu

== Ancestry ==
Ancestors of Tokugawa Yorifusa

8. Matsudaira Kiyoyasu (1511-1535)
4. Matsudaira Hirotada (1526-1549)
9. Aoki
2. Tokugawa Ieyasu, 1st Tokugawa Shōgun (1543-1616)
10. Mizuno Tadamasa (1493-1543)
5. O-dainokata (1528-1602)
11. Keyōin (1492-1560)
1. Tokugawa Yorifusa, 1st Lord of Mito
12. Masaki Tokitada (1521-1576)
6. Masaki Yoritada (1551-1622)
13. Kasutani
3. Yōjuin (1580-1653)
7. Hōjō

Preceded by Tagaya Shigetsune	Daimyō of Shimotsuma; 1606–1609	Succeeded by Matsudaira Tadamasa
Preceded by Tokugawa Yorinobu	Daimyō of Mito; 1609–1661	Succeeded by Tokugawa Mitsukuni
