= Mitogaku =

School of Japanese historical and Shinto studies

Mitogaku 水戸学
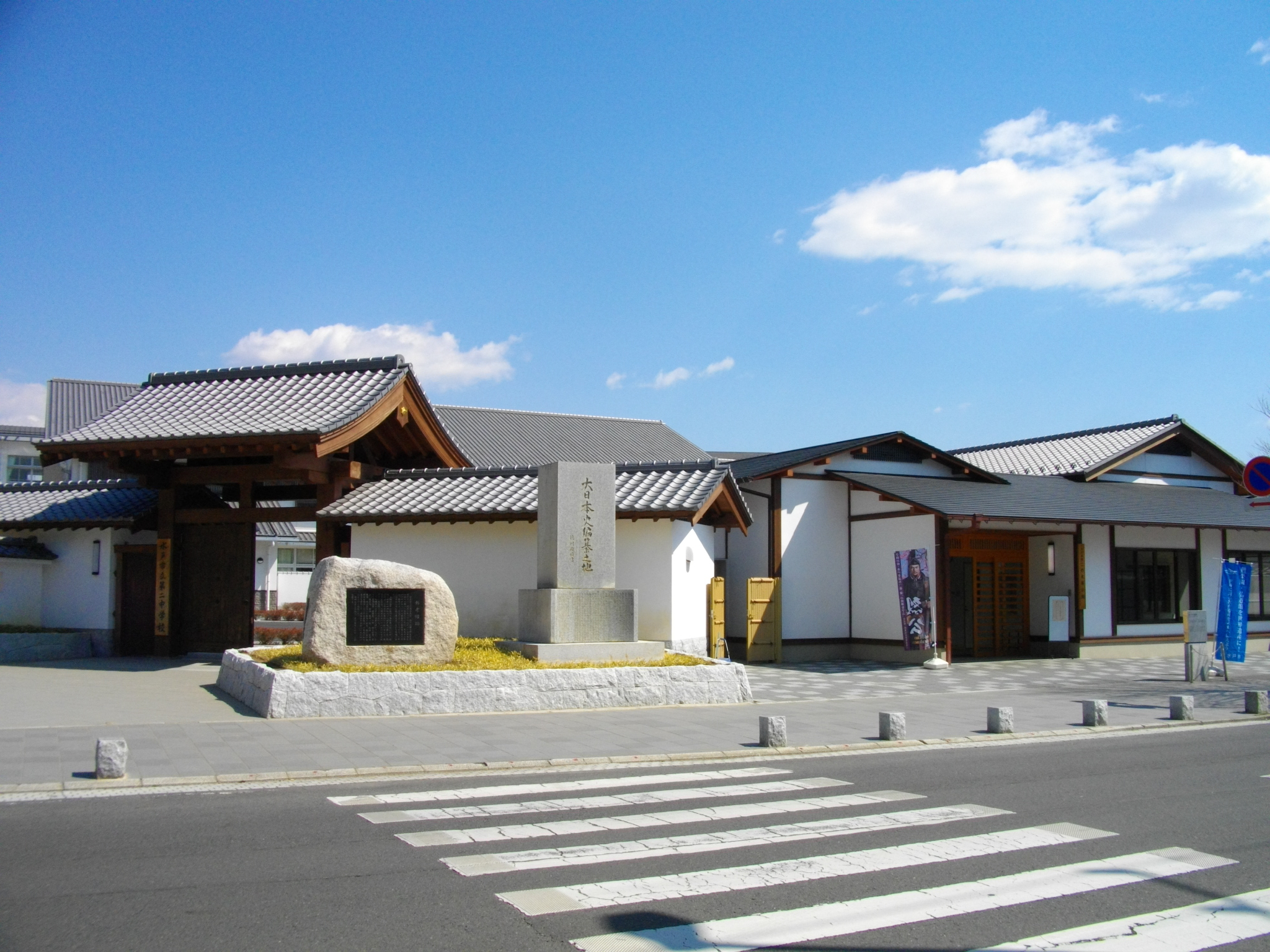
- Site of the Shōkōkan Hall
- Mito City; Japan

Information
- Type: Mito Domain
- Established: 1657

Mitogaku (水戸学) refers to a school of Japanese historical and Shinto studies that arose in the Mito Domain (modern-day Ibaraki Prefecture).

== Early history ==
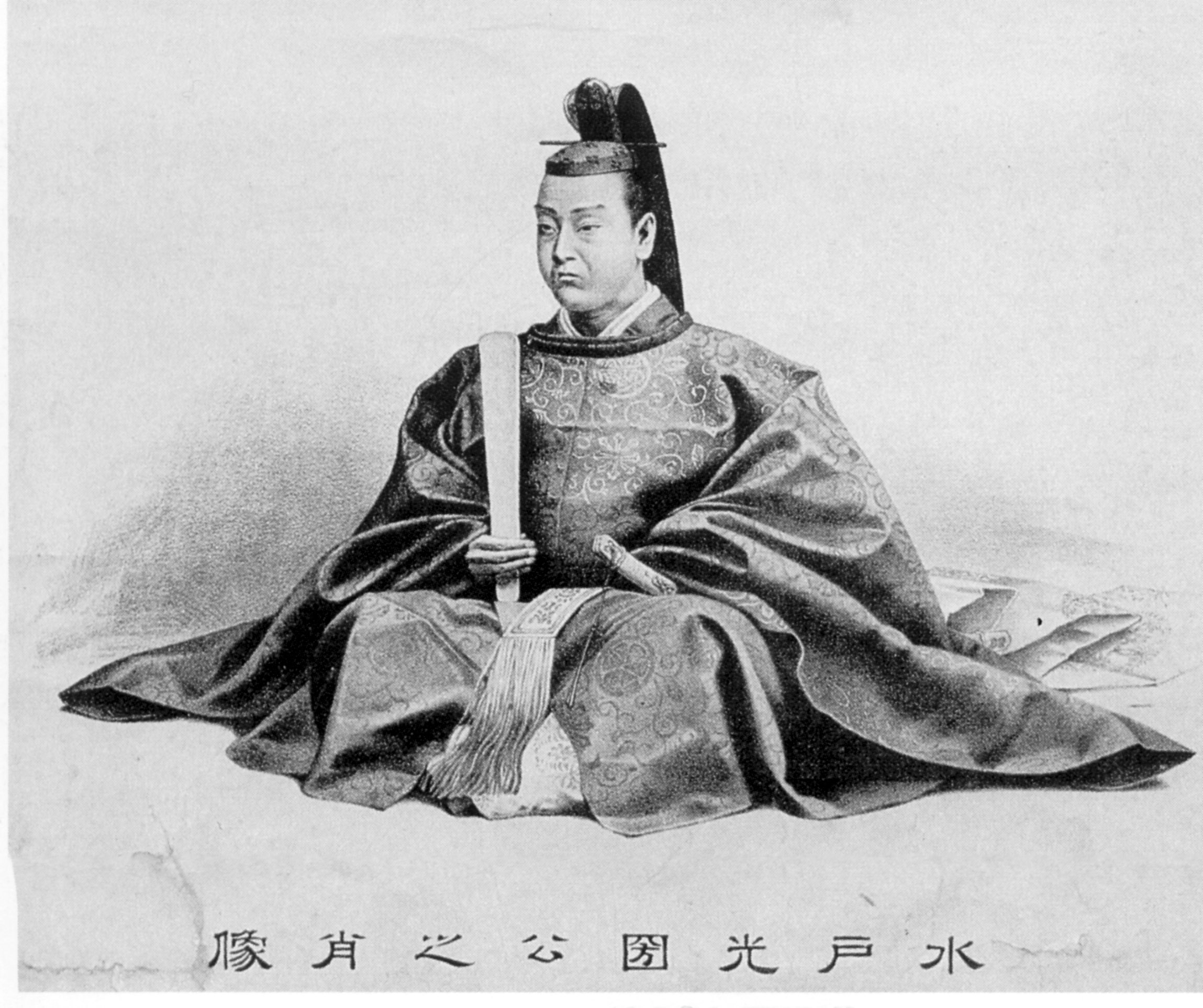
Tokugawa Mitsukuni

The school had its genesis in 1657 when Tokugawa Mitsukuni (1628–1700), second head of the Mito Domain, commissioned the compilation of the Dai Nihonshi. Among scholars gathered for the project were Asaka Tanpaku (1656–1737), Sassa Munekiyo (1640–1698), Kuriyama Senpō (1671–1706), and Miyake Kanran (1673–1718). Under the influence of Ming loyalist thinker Zhu Shunshui (1600-1682), the fundamental approach of the project was Neo-Confucianist, based on the view that historical development followed moral laws. Tokugawa Mitsukuni believed that Japan, as a nation that had long been under the unified rule of the emperor, was a perfect exemplar of a "nation" as understood in Sinocentric thought. The Dai Nihon-shi thus became a history of Japan as ruled by the emperors and emphasized respect for the imperial court and Shinto deities. In order to record historical facts, the school's historians gathered local historical sources, often compiling their own historical works in the process. Early Mitogaku scholarship was focused on historiography and scholarly work.

== Later history ==
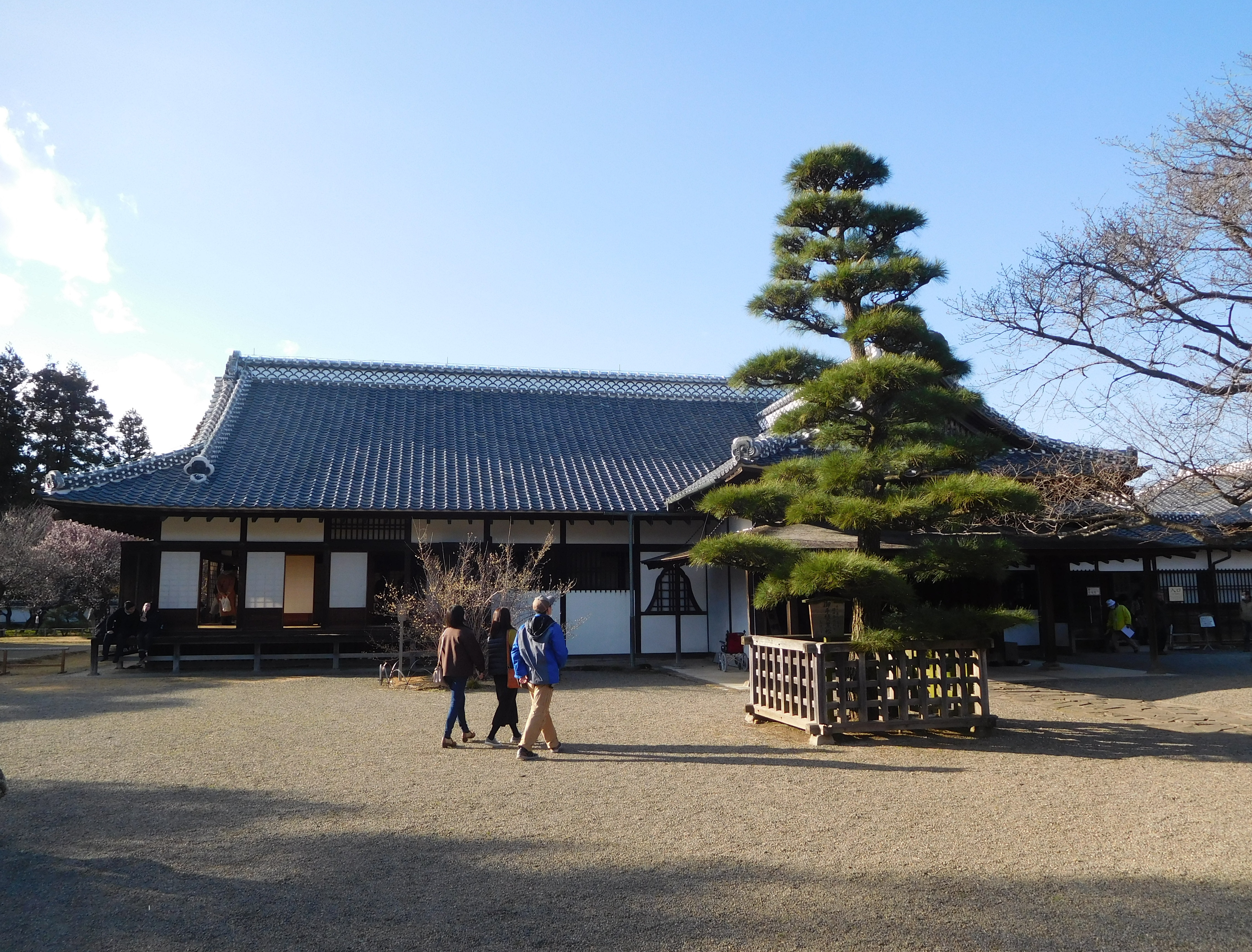
Kōdōkan (Mito)

Around the end of the 18th century, Mitogaku came to address contemporary social and political issues, beginning the era of Later Mitogaku. The ninth Mito clan leader, Tokugawa Nariaki (1800–1860), greatly expanded Mitogaku by establishing the Kōdōkan as the clan school. In addition to Confucianist and kokugaku thought, the school also absorbed knowledge from medicine, astronomy and other natural sciences. The Later Mitogaku era lasted until the Bakumatsu period. The school exerted a major influence on the sonnō jōi movement and became one of the driving forces behind the Meiji Restoration. However, it failed to gain the protection of the new government. The Kōdōkan was disbanded and its library largely taken over by the state.

== Present day ==
The Mito-shi Gakkai of Mito city, Ibaraki prefecture, is undertaking research into the historical and ideological aspects of Mitogaku. Major works of the school include Shintō shūsei, Dai Nihon Jingi Shi, and Jingi Shiryō, and collections and studies of fudoki and studies of the Kogo Shūi.

== See also ==
- Han school
- Japanese aesthetics
