= Fukoku kyōhei =

Japanese national slogan

Japanese name
- Kana: ふこくきょうへい
- Kyūjitai: 富國强兵
- Shinjitai: 富国強兵
Transcriptions
- Revised Hepburn: Fukoku kyōhei

Fukoku kyōhei (富国強兵; "Enrich the Country, Strengthen the Armed Forces") was Japan's national slogan during the Meiji period, replacing the slogan sonnō jōi ("Revere the Emperor, Expel the Barbarians"). It is a yojijukugo phrase, originally from the ancient Chinese historical work on the Warring States period, Zhan Guo Ce.

== Etymology ==
During the Warring States period of China, the Qin—through its legalist policies—placed considerable focus on the enhancement of state wealth and military power, also known by the expression Fuguo Qiangbing. This expression was adopted in Meiji Japan as Fukoku kyōhei in Japanese.

== Significance ==
The slogan was the central objective of the Meiji leaders. Fukoku kyōhei entailed the formulation of far-reaching policies to transform Japanese society in an all-out effort to catch up with the West. Although the government played a major role in providing the setting for industrialization, destroying old institutions that proved obstacles to industrialization, and creating new institutions that would facilitate economic and political modernization, private enterprise also played a critical role in the distinctly Japanese combination of public and private sector effort, later criticized in the 1980s as "Japan Inc." This symbolized an emerging nationalism in Japan.
