= Dai Nihonshi =

Japanese historical work

Dai Nihonshi Great History of Japan
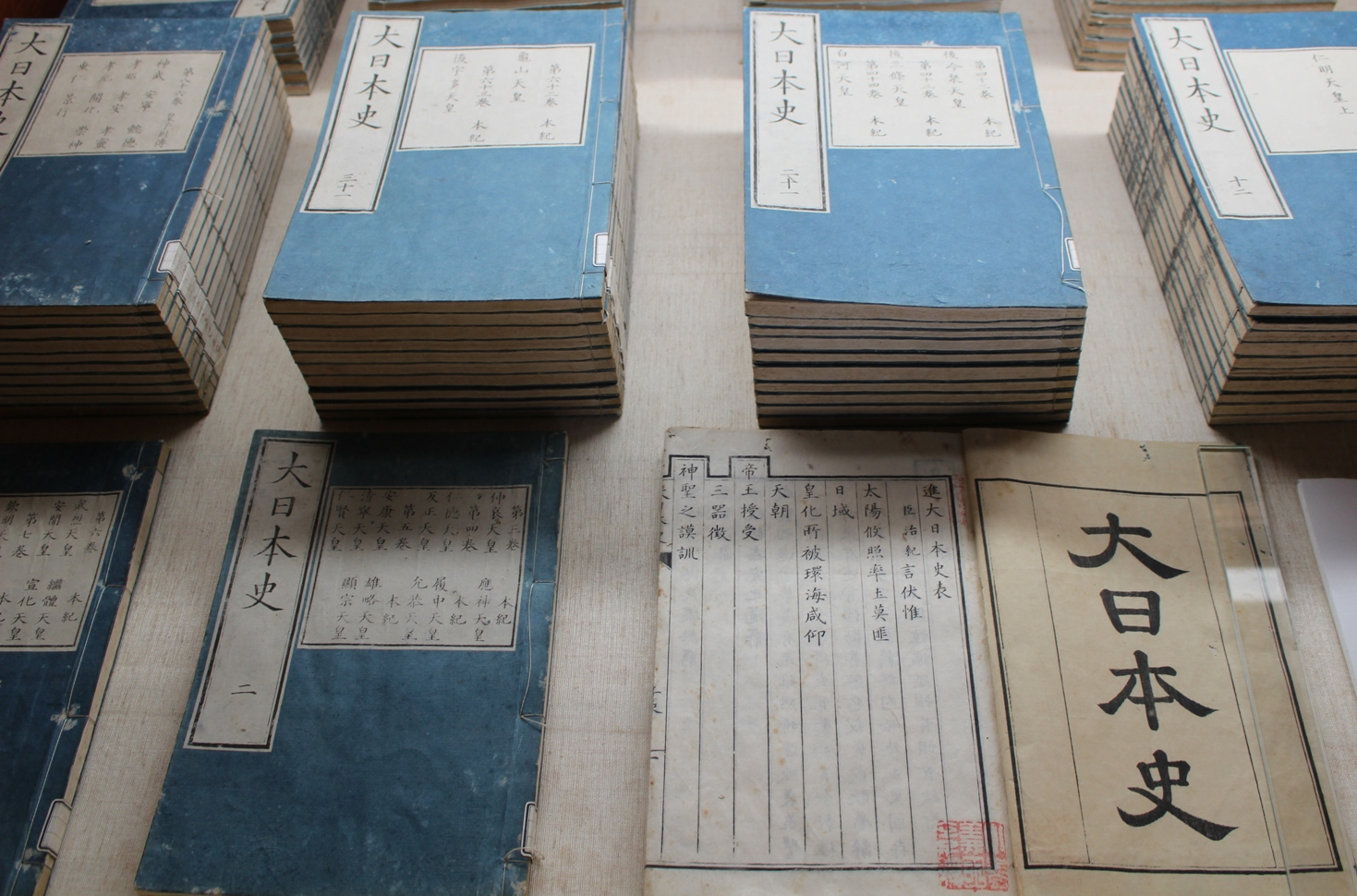
- Dai Nihonshi Collection
- Author: Mitogaku
- Original title: 大日本史
- Language: Classical Chinese (Kanbun)
- Genre: History of Japan; Took about 250 years to complete 17th century - 1906
- Publisher: Mitogaku
- Publication place: Japan

The Dai Nihonshi (大日本史), literally History of Great Japan, is a book on the history of Japan written in Classical Chinese. It was begun in the 17th century and was completed by 1715 by Tokugawa Mitsukuni, the head of the Mito branch of the Tokugawa family. After his death, work on the book was continued by the Mito branch until its completion in the Meiji era. The format of the book closely resembles the Chinese literary histories in form and structure and is considered extremely accurate. Dai Nihonshi was given its name by the feudal lord Tokugawa Tsunaeda in 1715, after the death of Tokugawa Mitsukuni. Contemporaneously it was also known by the names Honchō-shiki (lit. Historical Record of the Imperial Court), Kokushi (lit. National History), and Washi (lit. History of Wa).

== Content ==
The work starts with Emperor Jimmu, the legendary first emperor of Japan, and covers the first hundred emperors, ending with Emperor Go-Komatsu (more precisely, it ends after the merging of the Southern Court and Northern Court in 1392, before the end of Emperor Go-Komatsu's reign).

The primary contents of the book, that is, the narration of historical events, occupies the first 73 volumes, the rest consists of supplemental material, the first 170 volumes of which are biographies of other members of the royal family, and of retainers to the court, 126 descriptions and 28 tables, a total of 397. The whole work comprises 397 volumes and 5 volumes of index, total 402 volumes printed.

== Context ==
The book is one of the major scholarly works of the Edo period, and laid the foundation of the Mito school (Mitogaku) and Kokugaku. Aizawa Seishisai a Japanese nationalist thinker from Mito school, also worked on the play. It is heavily influenced by Confucianism, especially the later Neo-Confucianism under Zhu Xi. Ming loyalist Zhu Zhiyu's disciples were directly associated with this project. However, instead of focusing on the Chinese classics like other Confucian schools, it centered on the Japanese classics and Japan as a land ruled by the tennō (尊王論 sonnōron).

This school of thought led to the Sonnō jōi movement, and eventually the Mito Rebellion against the Tokugawa shogunate during the Bakumatsu period.

== See also ==
- Twenty-Four Histories
