= Tokugawa Harutoshi =

Japanese daimyō

Lord of Mito
- In office 1805–1816
- Preceded by: Tokugawa Harumori
- Succeeded by: Tokugawa Narinobu

Personal details
- Born: December 7, 1773
- Died: October 10, 1816 (aged 42)

Tokugawa Harutoshi (徳川 治紀; 1773–1816) was a Japanese daimyō of the Edo period, who ruled the Mito Domain. He presented the Dai Nihonshi, a historical record of Japan, to the Imperial Court.

The eldest son of Tokugawa Harumori, his childhood name was Tsuruchiyo (鶴千代).

== Family ==
- Father: Tokugawa Harumori (1751–1805)
- Mother: Yayohime, daughter of Ichijo Michika
- Wife: Manhime, daughter of Tokugawa Shigenori of Kishu Domain
- Concubines:
  - Jose'in
  - Shimada-dono
  - Toyama-dono
- Children:
  - Kashiwahime by Manhime
  - Yasuhime by Manhime
  - Tokugawa Narinobu (1797-1829) by Jose'in
  - Juko (1796-1844) married Nijo Narinobu by Shimada
  - Tadahime married Matsudaira Yoshitatsu of Takasu Domain by Shimada
  - Kiyoko married Takatsukasa Masamichi by Toyama
  - Tokugawa Nariaki by Toyama

Preceded by Tokugawa Harumori	7th (Tokugawa) lord of Mito; 1805–1816	Succeeded by Tokugawa Narinobu
