= Tokugawa Mitsukuni =

Japanese daimyo of the Edo period

Senior First Rank Tokugawa Mitsukuni
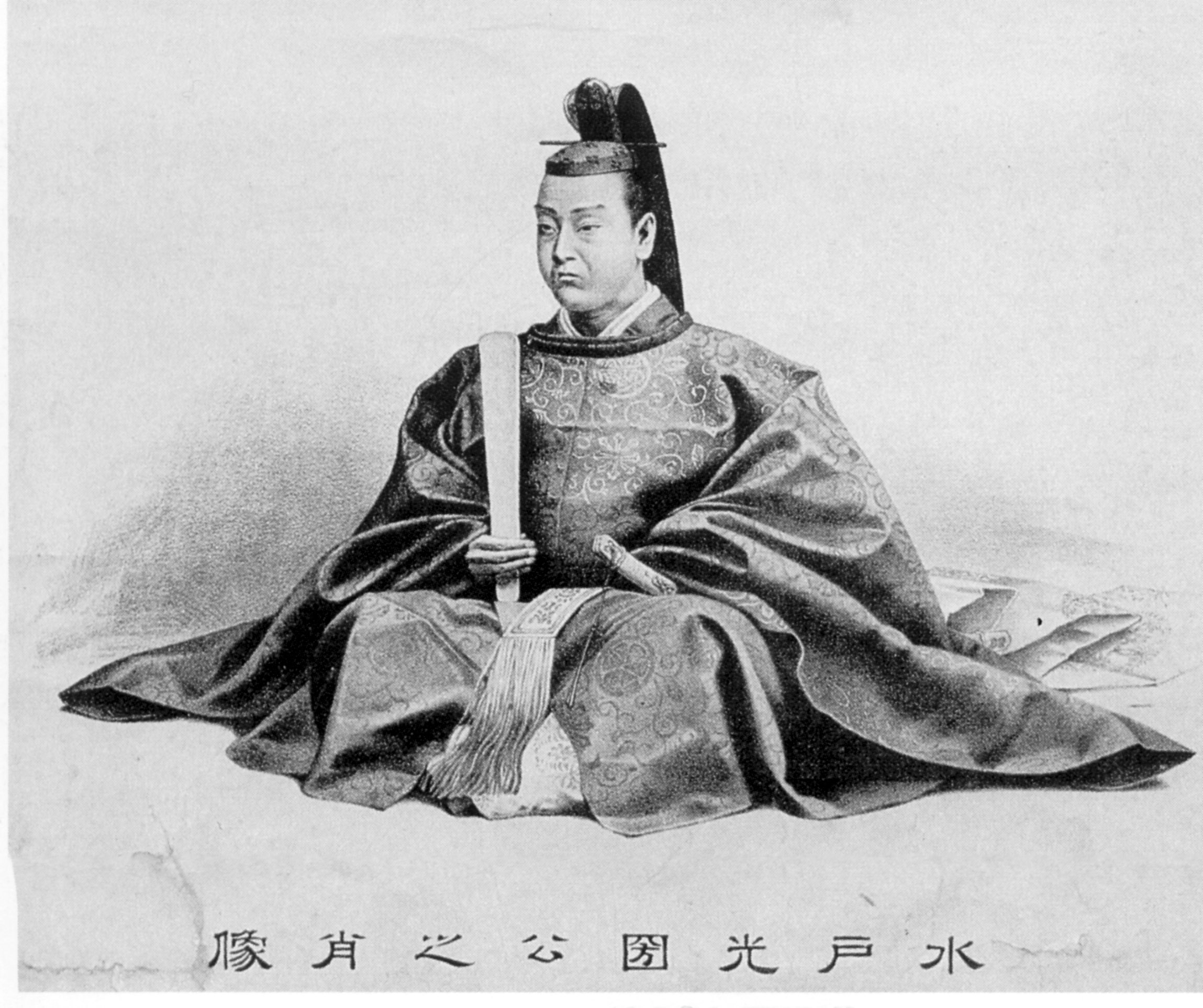

Daimyo of Mito
- In office 1661–1690
- Preceded by: Tokugawa Yorifusa
- Succeeded by: Tokugawa Tsunaeda

Personal details
- Born: 11 July 1628 Mito Domain, Hitachi Province, Japan
- Died: 14 January 1701 (aged 72)

Tokugawa Mitsukuni (徳川 光圀; Japanese pronunciation: [to.kɯꜜ.ɡa.wa | mʲi.tsɯ̥.kɯꜜ.ɲi, -kɯ.ɡa.wa mʲi.tsɯ̥.kɯꜜ-, -ŋa.wa-], 11 July 1628 – 14 January 1701), also known as Mito Kōmon (水戸黄門; [mʲi.to (|) koː.moɴ]), was a Japanese daimyo who was known for his influence in the politics of the early Edo period. He was the third son of Tokugawa Yorifusa (who in turn was the eleventh son of Tokugawa Ieyasu) and succeeded him, becoming the second daimyo of the Mito Domain.

== Biography ==
Tokugawa Mitsukuni was born on July 11, 1628, in Mito Domain, Hitachi Province as the third son of Tokugawa Yorifusa, the first daimyo of Mito Domain. His father was the eleventh son of Tokugawa Ieyasu, the founder and first shogun of the Tokugawa shogunate. At the age of six, his elder brother Yorishige became valetudinarian, and Mitsukuni was chosen to succeed his father. At the age of nine, he underwent genpuku (coming-of-age ceremony).

He was responsible for assembling the Mitogaku scholars to compile a huge Japanese history, Dai Nihonshi. In it, Japan was depicted as a nation under the Emperor, analogous to that in Chinese dynasties. This helped the rise of nationalism in the late shogunate and in the Mito Domain later. His childhood name was Chomaru (長丸) later become Chiyomatsu (千代松) this name was personally granted by his cousin and the shōgun, Tokugawa Iemitsu.

In 1661, at age 34, he became the daimyō of the Mito Domain. He anticipated the forcible division of kami and Buddhas (shinbutsu bunri) of 1868 ordering there the destruction of a thousand Buddhist temples and the construction of at least one shrine per village (one village, one shrine policy (一村一社, isson issha). At age 63, he was awarded the court office of gon-chūnagon, or provisional middle counsellor. In 1691, he retired to his villa, Seizan-sō.

He directed at Zuisen-ji the creation of the very first guide to Kamakura, the Shinpen Kamakurashi. The book would have a profound influence on the city in the following centuries, an influence which continues to this day in names for parts of the city like Kamakura's Seven Mouths, Kamakura's Ten Bridges, and other such popular monikers he coined.

In 1657 (Meireki 3) at the age of 27, he married a daughter of the kampaku Konoe Nobuhiro. He was also known as a gourmet of the Edo period. He is claimed to be one of the first Japanese to eat ramen as well as routinely enjoying such exotic food as wine and yogurt. Mitsukuni had one son, who took the Matsudaira surname. Additionally, Mitsukuni adopted the son of an elder brother; this adopted son, Tokugawa Tsunaeda, became his heir.

He died at his villa Seizansō in 1701. He posthumously received the court rank of junior first rank (1869) and first rank (1900). He is now considered to be a kami.

== Family ==
- Father: Tokugawa Yorifusa
- Mother: Hisa later Kyushoin (1604-1662)
- Wife: Hiroko (1638-1659) daughter of Konoe Nobuhiro
- Concubine: Tamai-Dono
- Son: Matsudaira Yoritsune (1652-1704) of Takamatsu Domain by Tamai

== Mito Kōmon ==
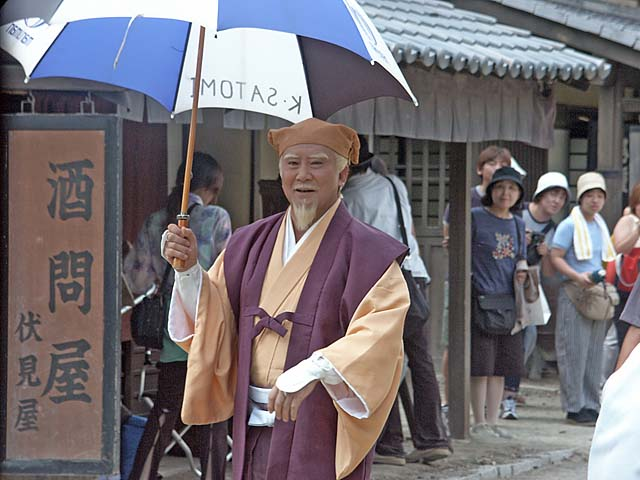
Actor Kōtarō Satomi as Tokugawa Mitsukuni in the jidaigeki "Mito Kōmon".

During the latter half of the Edo period and the Meiji period, a kōdan (narrative tale) named "Mito Mitsukuni Man'yūki" fictionalized the travels of Tokugawa Mitsukuni. This tradition of dramatizing his life continued with a novel and, in 1951, the first television series to portray him as a wanderer, masquerading as a commoner, who castigated the evil powers in every corner of the nation. From 1969 to 2011, the TBS ran the series Mito Kōmon, which continues to attract audiences in reruns. Episodes were re-broadcast in the early 1990s by WNYE-TV (New York City) under the title The Elder Lord of Mito.

Each summer, the city of Mito hosts the Mito Komon festival, which prominently features the Tokugawa seal, as well as actors representing Tokugawa Mitsukuni and his assistants.

== Honours ==
- Senior First Rank (16 November 1900; posthumous)

== See also ==
- Endoji Shopping Arcade Statues

Preceded by Tokugawa Yorifusa	Daimyō of Mito; 1661–1690	Succeeded by Tokugawa Tsunaeda
