= Sonnō jōi =

Nationalist slogan in 1850s Japan

Chinese name
- Traditional Chinese: 尊王攘夷
Transcriptions
Standard Mandarin
- Hanyu Pinyin: Zunwang Rangyi
Yue: Cantonese
- Jyutping: zyun1 wong4 joeng4 ji4

Japanese name
- Kanji: 尊王攘夷
- Kana: そんのうじょうい
Transcriptions
- Romanization: Sonnō jōi

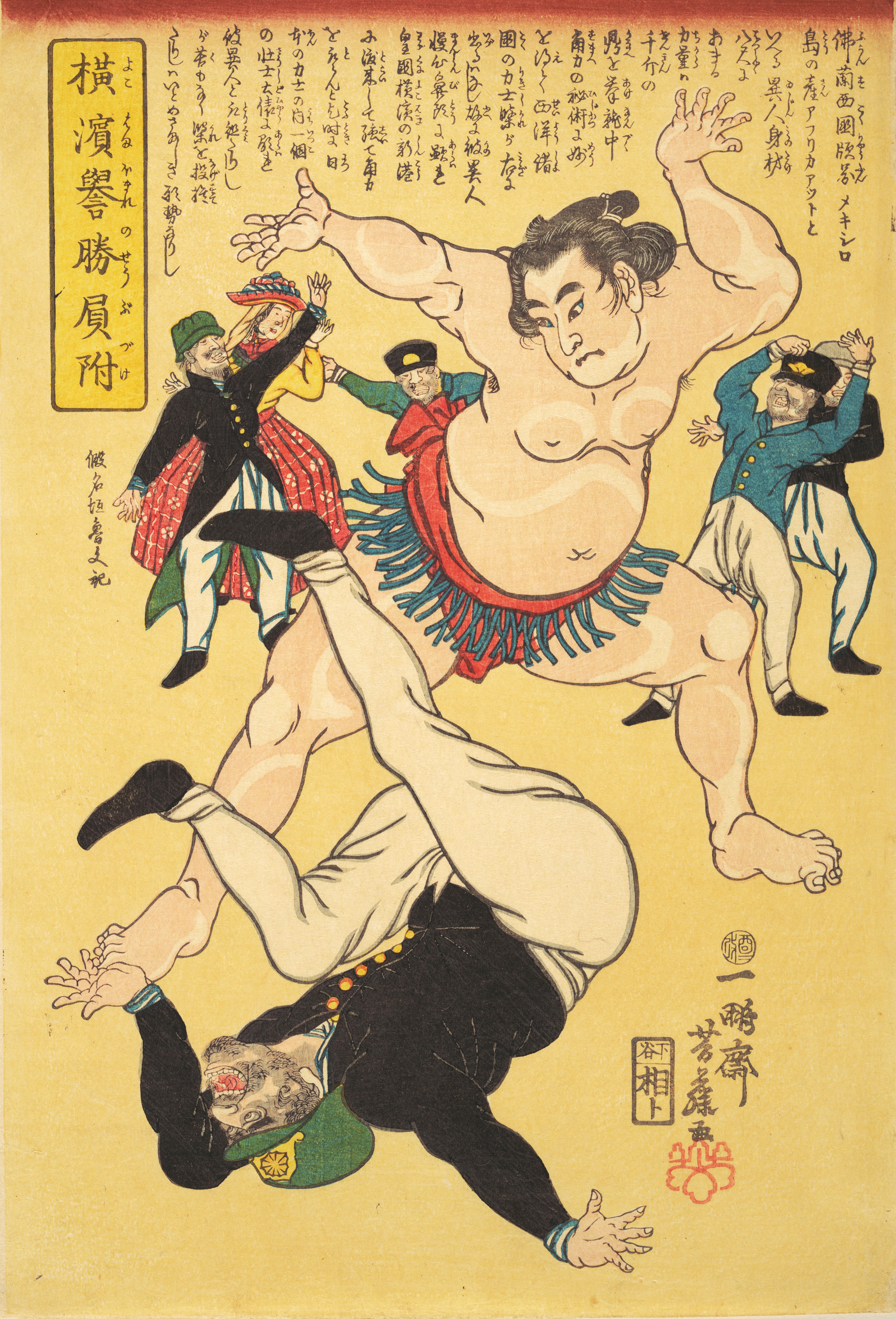
An 1861 image expressing the Jōi (攘夷, "Expel the Barbarians") sentiment

Sonnō jōi (尊王攘夷; "revere the emperor, expel the barbarians") was a yojijukugo (four-character compound) phrase used as the rallying cry and slogan of a political movement in Japan in the 1850s and 1860s, during the Bakumatsu period. Based on Neo-Confucianism and Japanese nativism, the movement sought to overthrow the Tokugawa shogunate and restore the power of the Emperor of Japan.

== Etymology ==
Sonnō jōi is the Japanese reading of the Chinese idiom 尊王攘夷 zūn wáng rǎng yí coined by Chancellor Guan Zhong of Qi during China's the Spring and Autumn period of China in reference to the Zhou kings. Adopting and adhering to it, Duke Huan of Qi assembled the Chinese feudal lords to strike down the threat of Yi foreigners/"barbarians" from China. For it, Confucius himself praised Guan Zhong for the preservation of Chinese civilization through the example of the contrast in hairstyles and clothing styles of them the Hua (華) from the Yi (夷) peoples east of them who were foreign or "barbaric" to the Hua. Through the Analects of Confucius, the Chinese expression came to be transmitted to Japan as sonnō jōi.

== Philosophy ==
The origin of the philosophy as used in Japan can be traced to the Confucian classic the Gongyang Commentary of the Chunqiu. The Tokugawa shogunate promulgated the Zhu Xi school of Neo-Confucianism (Shushi-gaku), which interpreted the Chunqiu using this concept. 17th-century Confucian scholars Yamazaki Ansai and Yamaga Sokō wrote on the sanctity of the Imperial House of Japan and its superiority to the ruling houses of other nations. These ideas were expanded by Kokugaku scholar Motoori Norinaga, and seen in Takenouchi Shikibu's theory of absolute loyalty to the Emperor of Japan (尊皇論, sonnōron), that implied that less loyalty should be given to the ruling Tokugawa shogunate.

Mitogaku scholar Aizawa Seishisai introduced the term sonnō jōi into modern Japanese in his work Shinron in 1825, where sonnō was regarded as the reverence expressed by the Tokugawa Shogunate to the emperor and jōi was the proscription of Christianity.

Sonnō jōi was an anti-imperialist expression popularized in response to Western imperialism, before Japan adopted imperialism itself against its neighbors.

== Influence ==
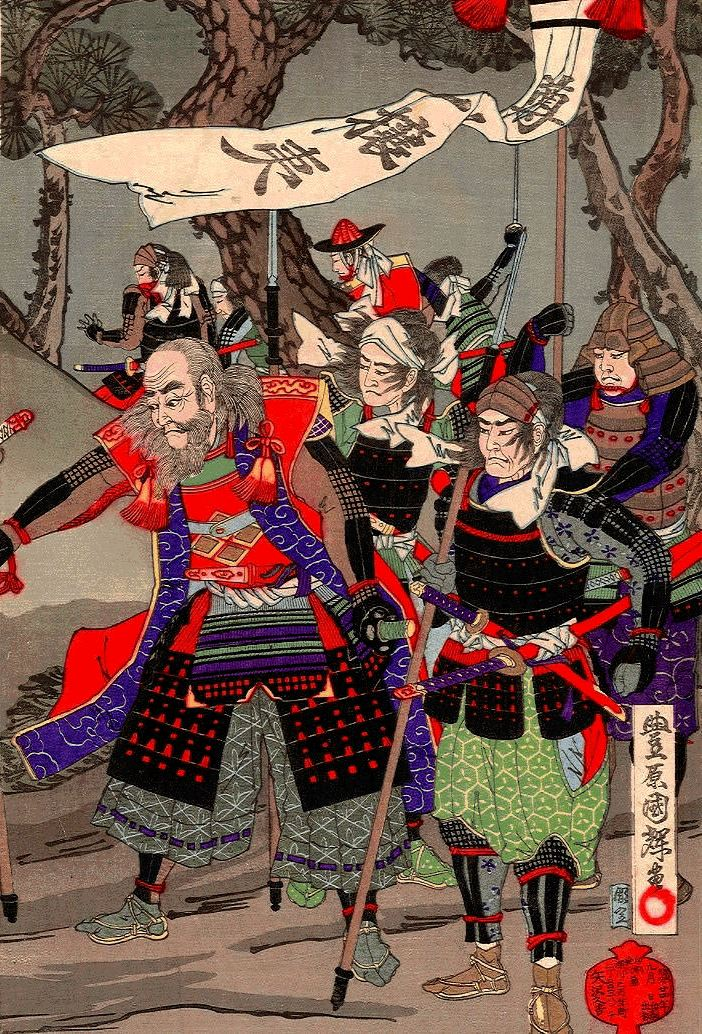
Part of a woodblock print by Utagawa Kuniteru III depicting samurai under a sonnō jōi banner during the 1864 Mito Rebellion

With the increasing number of incursions of foreign ships into Japanese waters in the late 18th and early 19th century, the sakoku ("national seclusion") policy came increasingly into question. The jōi "expel the barbarians" portion of sonnō jōi, changed into a reaction against the Convention of Kanagawa of 1854, which opened Japan to foreign trade. Under military threat from United States Navy Commodore Matthew C. Perry's so-called "black ships", the treaty was signed under duress and was vehemently opposed in samurai quarters. The fact that the Tokugawa Shogunate was powerless against the foreigners despite the will expressed by the Imperial court was taken as evidence by Yoshida Shōin and other anti-Tokugawa leaders that the sonnō (revere the Emperor) portion of the philosophy was not working, and that the Shogunate must be replaced by a government more able to show its loyalty to the Emperor by enforcing the Emperor’s will.

The philosophy was thus adopted as a battle cry of the rebellious regions of Chōshū Domain and Satsuma Province. The Imperial court in Kyoto sympathized with the movement. Emperor Kōmei personally agreed with such sentiments, and – breaking with centuries of imperial tradition – personally began to take an active role in matters of state: as opportunities arose, he fulminated against the treaties and attempted to interfere in the shogunal succession. His efforts culminated in March 1863 with his "Order to Expel Barbarians" (攘夷勅命). Although the Shogunate had no intention of enforcing the order, it nevertheless inspired attacks against the Shogunate itself and against foreigners in Japan, the most notable incident being the killing of the trader Charles Lennox Richardson during the Namamugi Incident. Other attacks included the shelling of foreign shipping in Shimonoseki. Rōnins (masterless samurai) also rallied to the cause, assassinating Shogunate officials and Westerners.

This turned out to be the zenith of the sonnō jōi movement, since the Western powers responded by demanding reparations for the assassinations and other acts by samurai against Western interests. In 1864, four Western nations launched a campaign against Shimonoseki, overrunning the meager defences and briefly occupying the region. While this incident showed that Japan was no match for Western military powers, it also served to further weaken the Shogunate, permitting the rebel provinces to ally and overthrow it, bringing about the Meiji Restoration.

The slogan itself was never actually a government or rebel policy; for all its rhetoric, Satsuma in particular had close ties with the West, purchasing guns, artillery, ships and other technology.

== Legacy ==
After the symbolic restoration of Emperor Meiji, the sonnō jōi slogan was replaced with fukoku kyōhei (富国強兵), or "enrich the nation, strengthen the armies", the rallying call of the Meiji period and the seed of its actions during World War II.

== See also ==
- This phrase is featured and examined in James Clavell's Gai-Jin: A Novel of Japan
- Kinmon incident
- Shishi
- Shōwa Restoration
- Okumura Ioko, member of the movement
