= Gosankyō =

Three branches of the Tokugawa clan of Japan

The Go-san-kyō (御三卿; "the Three Lords") were three branches of the Tokugawa clan of Japan. They were descended from the eighth of the fifteen Tokugawa shōguns, Yoshimune (1684–1751). Yoshimune established the Gosankyo to augment (or perhaps to replace) the Gosanke, the heads of the powerful han (fiefs) of Owari, Kishū, and Mito. Two of his sons, together with the second son of his successor Ieshige, established the Tayasu, Hitotsubashi, and Shimizu branches of the Tokugawa.

== Heads of Gosankyo ==
=== Tayasu House 田安家 ===
1. Munetake (1716–1771, r. 1731–1771)
2. Haruaki (1753–1774, r. 1771–1774)
3. Narimasa (1779–1846, r. 1787–1836)
4. Naritaka (1810–1845, r. 1836–1839)
5. Yoshiyori (1828–1876, r. 1839–1863)
6. Takachiyo (1860–1865, r. 1863–1865)
7. Kamenosuke (1863–1940, r. 1865–1868)
8. Yoshiyori (2nd time) (1828–1876, r. 1868–1876)
9. Satotaka (1865–1941, r. 1876–1941)
10. Satonari (1899–1961, r. 1941–1961)
11. Munefusa (1929– , r. 1961– )

=== Shimizu House 清水家 ===
1. Shigeyoshi (1745–1795, r. 1758–1795)
2. Atsunosuke (1796–1799, r. 1798–1799)
3. Nariyuki (1801–1846, r. 1805–1816)
4. Narinori (1810–1827, r. 1816–1827)
5. Narikatsu (1820–1849, r. 1827–1846)
6. Akitake (1853–1910, r. 1866–1868)
7. Atsumori (1856–1924, r. 1870–1924)
8. Yoshitoshi (r.1924-1963)
9. 豪英

=== Hitotsubashi House 一橋家 ===
- Tokugawa Ieyasu, 1st Tokugawa Shōgun (1543–1616; r. 1603–1605)
  - Tokugawa Yorinobu, 1st daimyō of Kishū (1602–1671)
    - Tokugawa Mitsusada, 2nd daimyō of Kishū (1627–1705)
      - Tokugawa Yoshimune, 8th Tokugawa Shōgun (1684–1751; 5th daimyō of Kishū: 1705–1716; 8th Tokugawa Shōgun: 1716–1745)
        - I. Tokugawa Munetada, 1st Hitotsubashi-Tokugawa family head (1721–1765; Hitotsubashi family head: 1735–1764)
          - II. Tokugawa Harusada, 2nd Hitotsubashi-Tokugawa family head (1751–1827; Hitotsubashi family head: 1764–1799)
            - Tokugawa Ienari, 11th Tokugawa Shōgun (1773–1841; r. 1786–1837)
              - Tokugawa Ieyoshi, 12th Tokugawa Shōgun (1793–1853; r. 1837–1853)
                - VI. Tokugawa Yoshimasa, 6th Hitotsubashi-Tokugawa family head (1825–1838, Hitotsubashi family head: 1837–1838)
              - Tokugawa Naritaka, 12th daimyō of Owari (1810-1845)
                - VIII. Tokugawa Shōmaru, 8th Hitotsubashi-Tokugawa family head (1846–1847, Hitotsubashi family head: 1847)
            - Tokugawa Narimasa, 3rd Tayasu-Tokugawa family head (1779–1848)
              - V. Tokugawa Narikura, 5th Hitotsubashi-Tokugawa family head (1818–1837; Hitotsubashi family head: 1830–1837)
              - VII.Tokugawa Yoshinaga, 7th Hitotsubashi-Tokugawa family head (1823–1847, Hitotsubashi family head: 1838–1847)
            - III. Tokugawa Nariatsu, 3rd Hitotsubashi-Tokugawa family head (1780–1816, Hitotsubashi family head: 1799–1816)
              - IV. Tokugawa Narinori, 4th Hitotsubashi-Tokugawa family head (1803–1830, Hitotsubashi family head: 1816–1830)
  - Tokugawa Yorifusa, 1st daimyō of Mito (1603–1661)
    - Matsudaira Yorishige, 1st daimyō of Takamatsu (1622–1695)
      - Matsudaira Yoriyuki (1661–1687)
        - Matsudaira Yoritoyo, 3rd daimyō of Takamatsu (1680–1735)
          - Tokugawa Munetaka, 4th daimyō of Mito (1705–1730)
            - Tokugawa Munemoto, 5th daimyō of Mito (1728–1766)
              - Tokugawa Harumori, 6th daimyō of Mito (1751–1805)
                - Tokugawa Harutoshi, 7th daimyō of Mito (1773–1816)
                  - Tokugawa Nariaki, 9th daimyō of Mito (1800–1860)
                    - Tokugawa Yoshiatsu, 10th daimyō of Mito (1832–1868)
                      - Tokugawa Atsuyoshi, 12th Mito family head, 1st Marquess (1855–1898; 12th family head: 1883–1898; Marquess: 1884)
                        - XII. Tokugawa Muneyoshi, 12th Hitotsubashi-Tokugawa family head, 2nd Count (1897-1989; Hitotsubashi family head: 1934–1989; 2nd Count: 1934–1947)
                          - XIII. Tokugawa Munenobu, 13th Hitotsubashi-Tokugawa family head (1929-1993; Hitotsubashi family head: 1989–1993)
                            - XIV. Tokugawa Munechika, 14th Hitotsubashi-Tokugawa family head (born 1959; Hitotsubashi family head: 1993–present)
                              - Munefumi (born 1986)
                              - Munenari (born 1994)
                    - IX. Tokugawa Yoshinobu, 15th Tokugawa Shōgun, 9th Hitotsubashi-Tokugawa family head, 1st Head and 1st Prince of the Tokugawa Yoshinobu line (1837–1913; Hitotsubashi family head: 1847–1866; Shōgun: 1866–1867, 1st Head of the Tokugawa Yoshinobu line: 1868–1913, 1st Prince of the Tokugawa Yoshinobu line: 1902–1913)
                - Matsudaira Yoshinari, 9th daimyō of Takasu (1776–1832)
                  - Matsudaira Yoshitatsu, 10th daimyō of Takasu (1800–1862)
                    - X. Tokugawa Mochinaga, 10th Hitotsubashi-Tokugawa family head (1831–1884, Hitotsubashi family head: 1866–1884)
                      - XI. Tokugawa Satomichi, 11th Hitotsubashi-Tokugawa family head, 1st Count (1872-1934, Hitotsubashi family head: 1884–1944; Count: 1884-relinquished 1934)
