= Nobusuke =

- Gender: Male

Origin
- Origin: Japanese
- Meaning: Different meanings depending on the kanji used

Nobusuke (written 信輔 or 信介) is a masculine Japanese given name. Notable people with the name include:

- Nobusuke Kishi (岸 信介; 1896–1987), Japanese politician and Prime Minister of Japan
- Nobusuke Takatsukasa (鷹司 信輔; 1890–1959), Japanese politician
