= Satonari =

- Gender: Male

Origin
- Origin: Japanese
- Meaning: Different meanings depending on the kanji used

Satonari (written: 達成 or 智成) is a masculine Japanese given name. Notable people with the name include:

- Prince Kitashirakawa Satonari (北白川宮智成親王), (1856–1872), Japanese prince
- Satonari Tokugawa (徳川 達成) (1899–1961), Imperial Japanese Navy officer
- Yonekura Satonori (米倉里矩) (1733-1749), Japanese lord
