= Iehiro =

- Gender: Male

Origin
- Origin: Japanese
- Meaning: Different meanings depending on the kanji used

Iehiro (written: 家熈 or 家広) is a masculine Japanese given name. Notable people with the name include:

- Konoe Iehiro (近衛 家熈; 1667–1736), Japanese court noble
- Iehiro Tokugawa (徳川 家広; born 1965), Japanese writer and translator
