= Toshimichi =

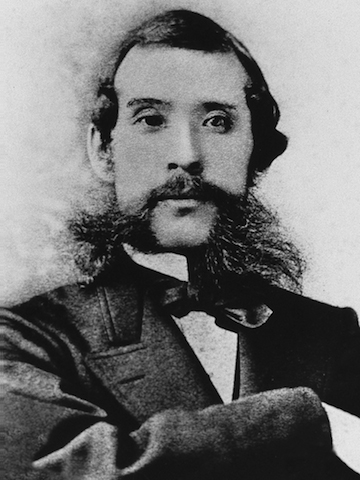
- Toshimichi Okubo (1830–1878), Japanese samurai
- Pronunciation: toɕimitɕi (IPA)
- Gender: Male

Origin
- Origin: Japanese
- Meaning: Different meanings depending on the kanji used

Other names
- Alternative spelling: Tosimiti (Kunrei-shiki) Tosimiti (Nihon-shiki) Toshimichi (Hepburn)

Toshimichi is a masculine Japanese given name.

== Written forms ==
Toshimichi can be written using different combinations of kanji characters. Some examples:

- 敏道, "agile, way"
- 敏路, "agile, route"
- 敏通, "agile, pass through"
- 俊道, "talented, way"
- 俊路, "talented, route"
- 俊通, "talented, pass through"
- 利道, "benefit, way"
- 利路, "benefit, route"
- 利通, "benefit, pass through"
- 年道, "year, way"
- 年路, "year, route"
- 寿道, "long life, way"
- 寿路, "long life, route"

The name can also be written in hiragana としみち or katakana トシミチ.

== Notable people with the name ==
- Toshimichi Okubo (大久保 利通, 1830–1878), Japanese samurai.
- Toshimichi Takatsukasa (鷹司 平通, 1923–1966), Japanese noble.
