= Princess Yoshiko (Arisugawa-no-miya) =

Japanese princess (1804–1893)

Princess Yoshiko 吉子女王
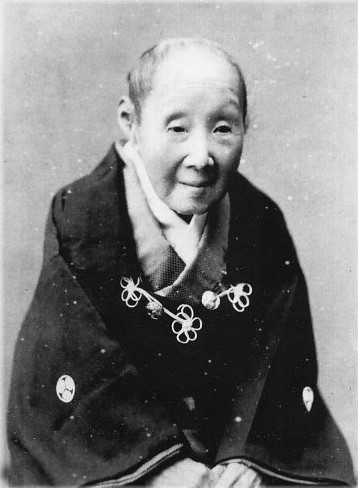
- Yoshiko in later life
- Born: Arisugawa-no-miya Tomi; October 28, 1804
- Died: 27 January 1893 (aged 88); Tokyo
- Burial: Zuiryuzan temple, Mito, Ibaraki Prefecture
- Spouse: Tokugawa Nariaki
- Issue: Yoshiatsu (ja) (her eldest son); Yoshinobu (her third son)
Names
- Tokugawa Yoshiko
- House: Chiefs of the Tokugawa shogunate as: Ieyoshi (12th, brother-in-law); Yoshinobu (15th); Feudal lords as: Yoshiatsu, Mito Domain; Tsuchiya Tsugunao, Tsuchiura Domain (stepson); Akitake, Shimizu-Tokugawa Family (stepson)
- Father: Prince Taruhito of Arisugawa-no-miya; (twelfth and the last daughter)
- Mother: Ando Kiyoko
- Occupation: Imperial princess, the first wife of feudal lord Tokugawa Nariaki of Mito Domain

Princess Yoshiko (吉子女王, 28 October 1804 – 27 January 1893) was the younger sister of Prince Tsunahito of the Arisugawa-no-miya cadet branch of the Imperial House of Japan. Yoshiko was married to Tokugawa Nariaki, and was mother to the 10th Lord Yoshiatsu, and the 15th and final Tokugawa shogun, Tokugawa Yoshinobu.

== Personal history ==
Yoshiko, the twelfth and youngest daughter of Prince Taruhito of the Arisugawa-no-miya family, was born of the union of her father and the courtesan Ando Kiyoko. She was called Princess Tomi (登美宮, Tomi no miya) as a child. She later moved to Edo from Kyoto, where her husband renamed her Teihoin (貞芳院) in case she were to be widowed. Upon her death, she was given the posthumous name Madam Bummei (文明夫人, Bummei fujin). She died in 1893 at the age of 88 in Tokyo. Tokugawa Yoshiko rests at the Zuiryusan temple, the official Bodhi temple of the Mito clan in Ibaraki Prefecture.

In 1830, at the age of 27, Yoshiko was engaged to Nariaki, who was 37 but had not yet had his first wife as he had become the head of his clan just the year before. Princess Takako was said to have arranged the marriage, and Emperor Ninkō was recorded as having issued an approving comment on the political and educational pedigrees of the Mito branch of the Tokugawa clan. The Mito branch was further renowned for having enthusiastically supported the imperial system for generations, and the emperor gladly approved of the marriage.

When Yoshiko moved to Edo and started leading the life of a samurai wife, she kept the attire of the imperial household for weeks after her marriage. In a portrait she posed for at the time, she wore a kosode and hakama, in the style of centuries past. In a letterbox with that portrait, Nariaki called his wife Yoshiko, instead Princess Yoshiko or other names. Among Nariaki's 37 children with four wives, Yoshiko was the mother of his first son, Yoshiatsu, his seventh son, Yoshinobu, and finally a daughter. A fourth child, born before Yoshinobu, died prematurely.

Yoshiko was known to be fluent in the arts, particularly waka poems, as well as Japanese calligraphy and the Arisugawa family heritage. Embroidery and playing music on the koto and the hichiriki were among her hobbies. (Note: As Yoshiko's marriage to a feudal lord was to join a lower social rank compared to the imperial household, it meant she would never come back to Kyoto, and visited the palace to bid farewell to her relatives and left a waka poem. While the cherry blossoms will be at the peak in the remote place, / let the sweet smell reach above the clouds to the palace. (天ざかるひなにはあれど櫻花／雲の上まで咲き匂はなん, Amazakaru hina niwa aredo sakurabana / kumo no ue made saki niowanan)) After relocating to Mito from Edo, she learned to fish at the river by the castle.

Being an imperial princess and a sister-in-law of the twelfth shogun, Ieyoshi, high-ranking officials including Ii Naosuke and his followers in the Edo government were said to surveil her in case she advised either the shogun or the emperor on political issues. (Note: In July, 1858 (Ansei 5th), the ko-metsuke (junior censor or intelligent survey officer) wrote the following statement to "Tairo" (ja) and Rōjū, the top rank officials. "Because for the temperament of Lady Behind the Screen (= Tomi-no-miya Yoshiko), she often writes to those she cares about on various topics, and that extends naturally to the housemaids or homemakers under her supervision, but even concerning controversial political topics related to home affairs or the maritime defenses. While the recent policy of the government was quite reasonable, it is said that she was quite upset with that arrangement. As she is a relative to Prince Nikko the Monk, it seems that both share the same sentiment. It is rumored that she wrote a letter to Kyoto (Imperial court)." This letter would be the evidence that not only in homemaking of a feudal household Yoshiko was deeply involved in politics as well as interested in national defense matters.) After Nariaki was charged during the Ansei Purge for taking part in anti-shogun movements and detained in Mito for life in 1859, it took her three months to obtain permission and move from Edo to Mito. Widowed the next year, Yoshiko followed samurai custom and cut her hair short and made a pabbajja, retiring from social activities, and was renamed as Teiho-in (貞芳院).

== Later life ==
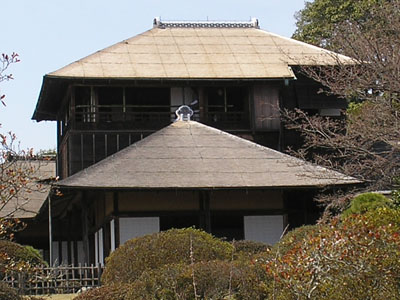
Kobuntei villa in Mito city

Between 1869 and 1873 (second and sixth years of Meiji), Yoshiko resided in the Kobuntei Villa in Kairaku-en garden, which her late husband opened. Her stepson Akitake invited Yoshiko to live in his mansion at Koume, Tokyo, which was the shimo-yashiki, or the second official residence of the Mito clan in Edo. While the samurai custom prohibited Yoshiko from living with her only surviving natural son, Yoshinobu, they did exchange letters. Yoshinobu had been adopted to the Hitotsubashi family when he was eleven to be entitled as an heir to the shogunate so that he was no longer regarded as Yoshiko's "direct family".

It took years for Yoshiko to overcome the prejudice among Meiji politicians as being anti-government, and for being the mother of Yoshinobu who had opened fire against the government supporters in Kyoto. Additionally, the Mito clan was radically against opening the country to foreign relations and trades. As the emperor governed the Meiji government, Yoshiko had been distanced from her kin in Kyoto (Note: In February 1869, her great-niece Yoshiko (28 March 1851 – 4 January 1895) by her brother's son Prince Arisugawa Takahito was married with Ii Naonori (22 May 1848 – 9 January 1904). Naonori's father was Ii Naosuke, who ordered Nariaki's detainment in Mito.) before she regained family ties with her grand nephew Prince Taruhito of the Arisugawa family (ja) (1835 – 1895). After she moved to Tokyo, Prince Taruhito wrote in his diary that after January 1873, Yoshiko invited the Prince to her residence and sent gifts when she heard Taruhito was ill and also when the engagement of Prince Taruhito was publicized in June 1873.

Yoshiko recovered her social status when late Nariaki was honored with the rank of Sho-ni-i (ja) or the Second Rank of Honor, posthumously in 1873 and commemorated the occasion by giving Prince Taruhito a handcrafted stationery. When Prince Taruhito lost his first wife Sadako to illness in 1872, Yoshiko mourned the death of her stepdaughter. She offered condolences, arranging an extended family reunion of the children of Nariaki for the deceased, with Prince Taruhito as the guest of honor. The eldest surviving son, Ikeda Yoshinori (ja), who was the lord of Tottori domain, offered his residence, inviting Akitake (Sadako's natural brother), Atsuyoshi (Yoshiatsu's son), Matsudaira Tadakazu (Shimabara domain), Tsuchiya Tsugunao (Tsuchiura domain) among others. Princess Ei, the wife of Akitake, who was Taruhito's pupil of calligraphy, joined them. (Note: Princess Ei was born to aristocrat Nakanoin Michitoyo (ja) and raised in Kyoto like Yoshiko was. They shared the aristocratic culture of Kyoto.)

Madam Bummei, her posthumous name, was given by her husband Nariaki before his death.

== See also ==
- Arisugawa family
- Mito domain
- Tokugawa Yoshinobu
