= Munefusa Tokugawa =

Munefusa Tokugawa (徳川宗英, Tokugawa Munefusa, born January 30, 1929) is the 11th-generation head of the Tokugawa clan. He is also the present head of the Tayasu branch of the Gosankyō.

== Early life ==
Munefusa was born in London. He is a graduate of Gakushūin and Keio University (Keiō Gijuku Daigaku).

He was a member of the 77th class—the last class—of the Imperial Japanese Naval Academy (Kaigun Heigakkō).

== Selected works ==
In a statistical overview derived from writings by and about Munefusa Tokugawa, OCLC/WorldCat encompasses roughly 8 works in 10 publications in 1 language and 20+ library holdings.

- 徳川家に伝わる徳川四百年の内緖話 (2004)
- 徳川家に伝わる徳川四百年の内緖話. ライバル敵将篇 (2005)
- 最後の幕閣 : 徳川家に伝わる47人の真実 (2006)
- 江田島海軍兵学校究極の人間教育 (2006)
- 徳川将軍家秘伝大老vs上さまvs大奥の舞台裏 (2008)
- 徳川家が見た幕末維新 (2010)

== Notes ==
Preceded by Satonari Tokugawa	Tayasu-Tokugawa family head 1961–present	Incumbent
