= Tsunenari Tokugawa =

Former Head of the Tokugawa House

Tokugawa Tsunenari 徳川恒孝

Head of the Tokugawa House
- Reign: 18 February 1963 – 1 January 2023
- Predecessor: Iemasa Tokugawa
- Successor: Iehiro Tokugawa
- Born: 26 February 1940 (age 86); Tokyo, Japan
- Issue: Iehiro Tokugawa 徳川家広
- Father: Ichirō Matsudaira
- Mother: Toyoko Tokugawa

Tsunenari Tokugawa (徳川 恒孝, Tokugawa Tsunenari; born 26 February 1940) is the 18th generation head of the Tokugawa clan. He is the son of Ichirō Matsudaira and Toyoko Tokugawa. His great-grandfather was the famed Matsudaira Katamori of Aizu and his maternal great-grandfather was Tokugawa Iesato. As a great-grandson of Shimazu Tadayoshi, the last lord of Satsuma Domain, he is also a second cousin of the former Emperor, Akihito.

Tsunenari was active for many years in the shipping company Nippon Yūsen, retiring in June, 2002, and is the head of the nonprofit Tokugawa Foundation. The nonprofit aims to preserve the remaining cultural treasures of the Tokugawa family, many of which were lost in the Meiji Restoration and World War II U.S. bombings. In 2007, Tsunenari published a book entitled Edo no idenshi (江戸の遺伝子), released in English in 2009 as The Edo Inheritance, which seeks to counter the common belief among Japanese that the Edo period (throughout which members of his Tokugawa clan ruled Japan as shōguns) was like a Dark Age, when Japan, cut off from the world, fell behind. On the contrary, he argues, the roughly 250 years of peace and relative prosperity saw great economic reforms, the growth of a sophisticated urban culture, and the development of the most urbanized society on the planet.

Tokugawa stepped down from being the head of the Tokugawa clan on 1 January 2023. His son, author and translator Iehiro Tokugawa, took over the role.

Preceded by Tokugawa Iesato	Tokugawa family head February 18, 1963 – January 1, 2023	Succeeded by Iehiro Tokugawa
