= Iehiro Tokugawa =

Japanese author and translator

- 19th Head of the House of Tokugawa
- Tokugawa giving a lecture in 2015, in Gamagōri city, Aichi Prefecture

19th Head of the House of Tokugawa
- Reign: 1 January 2023 – present
- Predecessor: Tsunenari Tokugawa
- Native name: 徳川 家広
- Born: February 7, 1965 (age 61); Shibuya, Tokyo
- Noble family: Tokugawa
- Father: Tsunenari Tokugawa
- Education: Keio University; University of Michigan; Columbia University
- Website: https://tokugawaiehiro.hatenadiary.org/

Iehiro Tokugawa (Shinjitai: 徳川家広, Kyūjitai: 德川家廣, Tokugawa Iehiro; born 7 February 1965) is a Japanese author and translator who is the 19th generation and current head of the main House of Tokugawa. His great-great-grandfather was the famed Matsudaira Katamori of Aizu, and his maternal great-great-grandfather was Tokugawa Iesato, the sixteenth head of the House of Tokugawa.

== Life ==
Tokugawa graduated from Keio University before completing a master's degree in economics at the University of Michigan. He is fluent in English, and translated from Japanese a book written by his father, Tsunenari Tokugawa titled Edo no idenshi (江戸の遺伝子) or The Edo Inheritance. He has translated Rajiv Chandrasekaran's book 'Green Zone' and books of Tony Blair, George Soros, George Friedman, Amy Chua, Frances McCall Rosenbluth into the Japanese language. He has also worked for the United Nations Food and Agriculture Organization.

In 2019, Tokugawa attempted to win a seat on the House of Councillors for the Shizuoka District, which he lost. He ran as a member of the Constitutional Democratic Party of Japan, and campaigned on completely decommissioning the Hamaoka Nuclear Power Plant, which was shut down following the Fukushima nuclear disaster in 2011.

External image
- Tokugawa's investiture

Tokugawa became the head of the Tokugawa clan after his father stepped down from the role on 1 January 2023.

== See also ==
- Matsudaira clan (parent house of Tokugawa clan)
- Nitta clan (parent house of Tokugawa clan)
- Minamoto clan (parent house of Matsudaira and Nitta clans)
- Imperial House of Japan (parent house of Minamoto clan)

Preceded by Tokugawa Tsunenari	Tokugawa family head January 1, 2023 – present
