= Muneyoshi Tokugawa =

Count Muneyoshi Tokugawa
- 徳川 宗敬
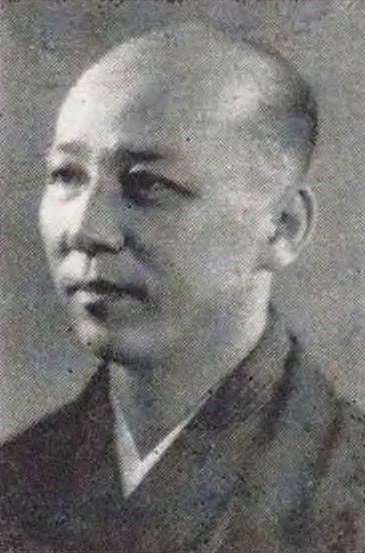

Vice President of the House of Peers
- In office 19 June 1946 – 2 May 1947
- President: Iemasa Tokugawa
- Preceded by: Tadamasa Sakai
- Succeeded by: Jiichirō Matsumoto (as Vice President of the House of Councillors)

Member of the House of Councillors
- In office 3 May 1947 – 2 May 1953
- Preceded by: Constituency established
- Succeeded by: Multi-member district
- Constituency: National district

Member of the House of Peers
- In office 10 July 1939 – 2 May 1947 Elected by the Counts

Personal details
- Born: 31 May 1897 Tokyo, Japan
- Died: 1 May 1989 (aged 91) Bunkyō, Tokyo, Japan
- Party: Ryokufūkai
- Education: Tokyo Imperial University

Military service
- Allegiance: Empire of Japan
- Branch/service: Imperial Japanese Army
- Rank: Second Lieutenant

Count Muneyoshi Tokugawa (徳川 宗敬, Tokugawa Muneyoshi; 31 May 1897 – 1 May 1989) was a Japanese forester, politician and Shintō priest. His court rank was Junior Third Rank.

== Biography ==
Muneyoshi was born on 31 May 1897, in the Mito Tokugawa family's villa in Minami-Katsushika District, Tokyo Prefecture (now part of Sumida Ward, Tokyo). He was the second son of the 12th head of the Mito Tokugawa family, Atsuyoshi Tokugawa. His mother was Tokugawa Soko. His birth name was Takanobu. Tokugawa Yoshinobu, the last shogun, was his great-uncle.

Tokugawa graduated from the Department of Forestry, Faculty of Agriculture of the Tokyo Imperial University in 1923. He later returned to his alma mater and earned a Doctorate of Agriculture in 1941.

On 19 June 1946, following the resignation of Count Tadamasa Sakai, Tokugawa assumed the position of Vice President of the House of Peers. With the enactment of the Constitution of Japan, the House of Peers was abolished, making him the last Vice President of the House of Peers (the last President of the House of Peers was Iemasa Tokugawa of the Tokugawa shogun family). In the same year, he became the third president of the Japan Association of Museums.

Tokugawa as a member of the Japanese delegation at the Treaty of San Francisco (second from the left behind Shigeru Yoshida)

In 1947, he won the first House of Councillors election for the national constituency and as one of the top candidates. He joined the conservative parliamentary faction, the Ryokufūkai, and became the chairman of the Ryokufūkai Members' General Meeting. In 1951, as chairman, he was appointed by Prime Minister Shigeru Yoshida as a plenipotentiary for the San Francisco Peace Treaty and participated in its signing.

Tokugawa was defeated in the 1953 House of Councillors election. He served as Chief Priest of Ise Shrine from 1966. After leaving that position in 1976, he was president of the Association of Shinto Shrines until his death.

Tokugawa was a recipient of the Order of the Sacred Treasure 1st class, Grand Cordon. In 1989 he posthumously received the highest distinction of the Scout Association of Japan, the Golden Pheasant Award.
