= Iemasa Tokugawa =

Japanese politician (1884–1963)

Prince Iemasa Tokugawa
- 德川 家正
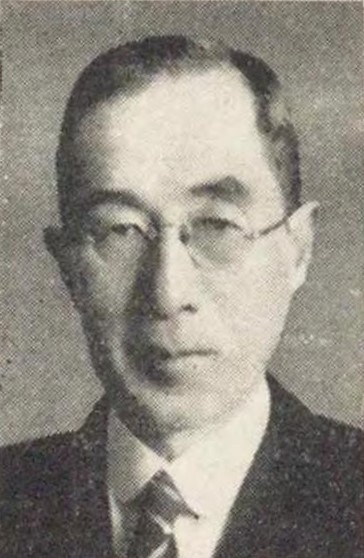
- Tokugawa as the President of the House of Peers (1946–1947)

President of the House of Peers
- In office 19 June 1946 – 2 May 1947
- Monarch: Hirohito
- Vice President: Muneyoshi Tokugawa
- Preceded by: Kuniyuki Tokugawa
- Succeeded by: Tsuneo Matsudaira (as President of the House of Councillors)

Member of the House of Peers
- In office 15 July 1940 – 2 May 1947 Hereditary peerage

Personal details
- Born: 23 March 1884 Minamitoshima, Tokyo, Japan
- Died: 18 February 1963 (aged 78) Shibuya, Tokyo, Japan
- Spouse: Naoko Shimazu
- Children: Iehide Tokugawa; Toyoko Tokugawa
- Parent(s): Tokugawa Iesato; Konoe Hiroko
- Relatives: Tsunenari Tokugawa (grandson)
- Education: Tokyo Imperial University

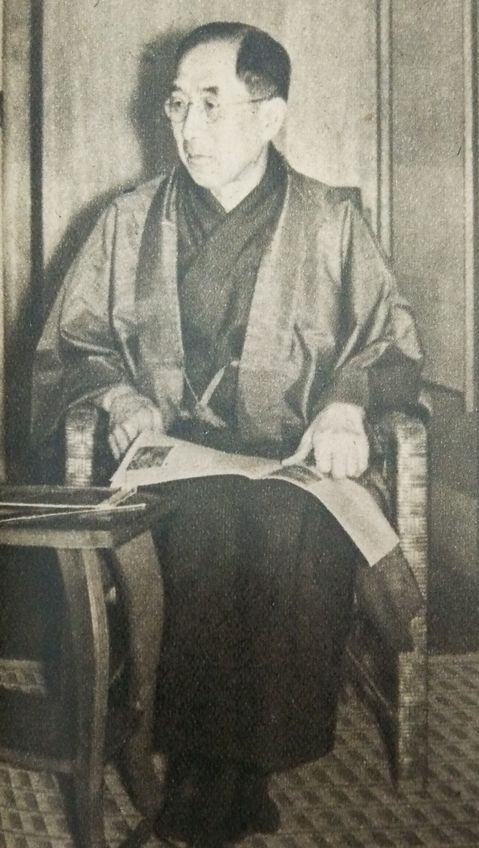
Iemasa Tokugawa

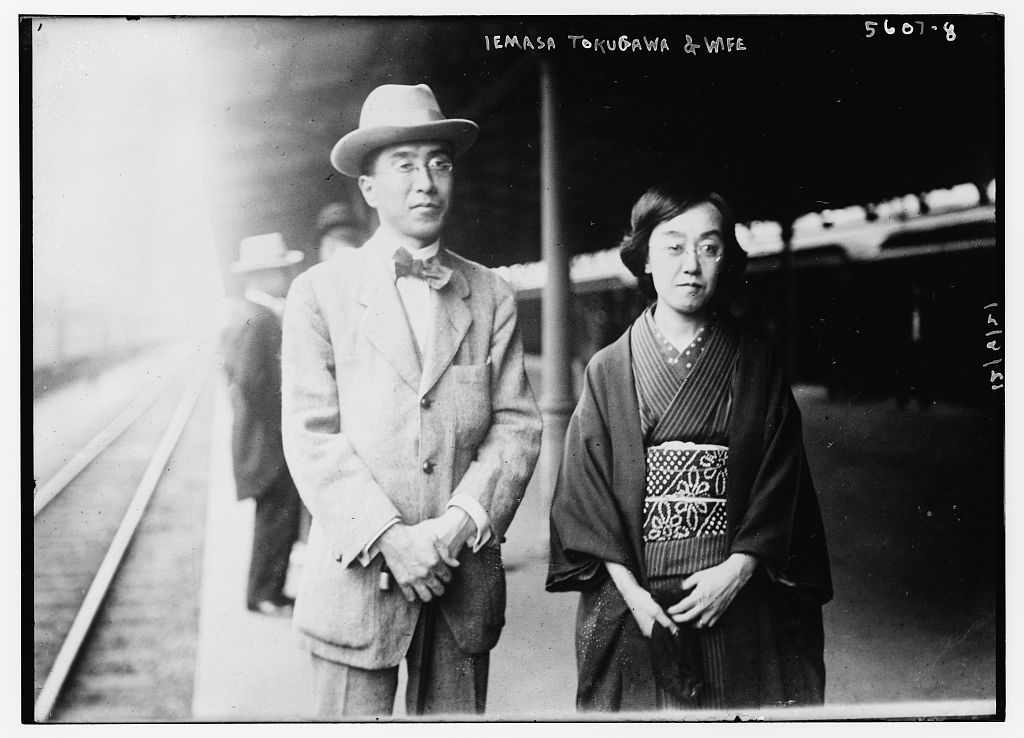
Tokugawa Iemasa and his wife, Shimazu Naoko

Prince Iemasa Tokugawa (徳川 家正, Tokugawa Iemasa; 23 March 1884 – 18 February 1963) also known as Iyemasa, was a Japanese political figure of the Taishō and early Shōwa periods. He was the 17th hereditary head of the former shogunal branch of the Tokugawa clan and the final President of the House of Peers in the Diet of Japan.

== Biography ==
Iemasa Tokugawa was born in what is now the Sendagaya district of Tokyo, as the eldest son of Tokugawa Iesato and his wife, Konoe Hiroko, daughter of Konoe Tadafusa. He graduated from the Faculty of Law at Tokyo Imperial University (the University of Tokyo) in 1909, and accepted a post in the diplomatic corps of Foreign Ministry the same year. In 1924, he was appointed Consul-general to the Japanese consulate in Sydney, Australia. In 1929, he was appointed Envoy to Canada and from 1937 to 1939 served as the Japanese ambassador to Turkey.

Iemasa often allied with his father Prince Tokugawa Iesato (aka Prince Iyesato Tokugawa) in promoting international goodwill projects between Japan and Europe, Canada, and United States. The Art of Peace book cover photo illustration presents Iemasa accompanying his father as his father receives an honorary doctor of laws degree from the president of the University of Southern California in 1934. During that same year, on 10 May 1934, Iyemasa was also recognized for his humanitarian and goodwill diplomatic efforts by a prominent North American University and was given an honorary doctor of laws degree from the University of British Columbia in Canada.

In 1940, on the death of his father, he inherited the title of kōshaku (公爵, 'prince' or 'duke') under the kazoku peerage system, and a seat as a member of the House of Peers of the Diet of Japan. On 19 June 1946, he served as the President of the House of Peers, a post which he held until 2 May 1947, when the Allied occupation authorities authorized the current Constitution of Japan abolishing the House of Peers along with the Nobility.

He died of heart disease at his home in Shibuya, Tokyo, on 18 February 1963, and was posthumously awarded the Order of the Rising Sun with Paulownia Flowers, 1st class. His grave is located at the Yanaka Cemetery in Tokyo. He was succeeded as head of the Tokugawa clan by Tsunenari Tokugawa, his grandson from Yasuko Tokugawa with Matsudaira Ichiro, son of Tsuneo Matsudaira.

== Family ==
- Father: Tokugawa Iesato
- Mother: Konoe Hiroko (1867-1944)
- Wife: Naoko Tokugawa (This marriage was decided by the will of Tenshō-in, who raised Tokugawa Iesato)
- Children
  - Iehide Tokugawa (1912-1936)
  - Toyoko Tokugawa married Ichiro Matsudaira, son of Tsuneo Matsudaira
  - Toshiko Tokugawa married Uesugi Takanori
  - Junko Tokugawa married Hoshina Mitsumasa
- Grandchild:
  - Tsunenari Tokugawa from Toyoko Tokugawa

== Honours ==
=== Japanese honours ===
- Medal with Dark Blue Ribbon (26 August 1942)
- Grand Cordon of the Order of the Rising Sun, first class (18 February 1963, upon death)

=== Foreign honours ===
- King George V Coronation Medal (5 October 1911)
- Officer of the Most Excellent Order of the British Empire (OBE) (21 February 1919)
- Order of the Precious Brilliant Golden Grain (Republic of China) (21 May 1921)
- Knight Commander of the Royal Victorian Order (KCVO) (29 July 1929)

Preceded by Tokugawa Iesato	Tokugawa family head 5 June 1940 – 18 February 1963	Succeeded by Tokugawa Tsunenari
