= Toshimichi Takatsukasa =

Japanese composer

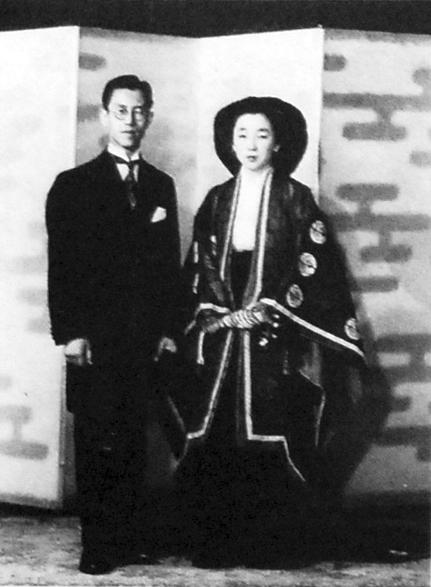
Toshimichi and Kazuko's wedding portrait, 1950

Toshimichi Takatsukasa (鷹司 平通, Takatsukasa Toshimichi; 26 August 1923 – 27 January 1966), son of Prince Nobusuke, was a Japanese researcher of railways and trains.

== Ancestry ==
Son of Prince Nobusuke, a politician and ornithologist who later became head priest of the Meiji Shrine, and Yasuko Tokugawa (1897-1976), a descendant of Tokugawa Yoshinao, Takatsukasa Toshimichi was born into an aristocratic family, but like all Japanese aristocrats, lost his title with the post-war legal reforms of 1947.

== Career ==
Takatsukasa worked at TEI Park, a railroad museum in Tokyo. He was a government railways official. His article "90 Years of Japanese Railways" was published in 1962, in the journal New Japan.

In 1966, Takatsukasa Toshimichi was found dead from carbon monoxide poisoning in the apartment of his mistress, a Ginza hostess.

== Personal life ==
Takatsukasa married the third daughter of Emperor Hirohito, Princess Kazuko. At the time of the wedding, Life magazine described him as "a commoner cousin of [Princess Kazuko's] grandmother's who makes $22.22 a week in the Government Railway Museum". In another international media report it was noted that "The bridegroom ... is son of the chief priest of the Meiji Shrine and holds a $10-a-week job in a railway museum." They had no biological children but adopted a son from the Ogyū-Matsudaira family, Naotake (born 1945), who would become president of Japan Telecommunications System Corporation (NEC Communication Systems) and head priest of the Ise Jingu Shrine; since 2022 he has been chairman of Kasumi Kaikan, an association for former kazoku, and a director of the Wild Bird Society of Japan, amongst other positions. Naotake's heir as head of the Takatsukasa family is his son, Naomichi (born 1974).

== Ancestry ==
Ancestors of Toshimichi Takatsukasa

16. Nijō Harutaka
8. Kujō Hisatada
17. Higuchi Nobuko
4. Takatsukasa Hiromichi
2. Nobusuke Takatsukasa
20. Tokudaiji Kin'ito
10. Tokudaiji Sanetsune
5. Tokudaiji Junko
22. Yamauchi Toyosuke
11. Yamauchi Kaneko
1. Toshimichi Takatsukasa
24. Tokugawa Narimasa
12. Tokugawa Yoshiyori
6. Tokugawa Iesato
3. Yasuko Tokugawa
28. Konoe Tadahiro
14. Konoe Tadafusa
29. Shimazu Kyōko
7. Konoe Hiroko
30. Shimazu Hisanaga
15. Shimazu Mitsuko
