= Takatsukasa Hiromichi =

Prince Takatsukasa Hiromichi
- 鷹司 煕通
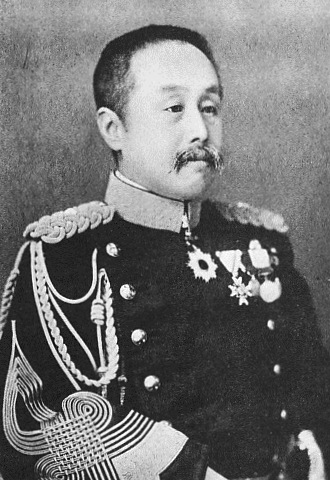

Grand Chamberlain to the Emperor
- In office 21 December 1912 – 15 May 1918
- Monarch: Taishō
- Preceded by: Katsura Tarō
- Succeeded by: Ogimachi Sanemasa

Member of the House of Peers
- In office February 1890 – 17 May 1918 Hereditary peerage

Personal details
- Born: 2 April 1855 Kyoto, Yamashiro, Japan
- Died: 17 May 1918 (aged 63) Minami-Azabu, Tokyo, Japan
- Children: Nobusuke Takatsukasa
- Parent(s): Kujō Hisatada (biological father); Takatsukasa Sukehiro (adoptive father)
- Relatives: Kujō family Takatsukasa family
- Education: Imperial Japanese Army Academy

Prince Takatsukasa Hiromichi (鷹司 煕通; 2 April 1855 – 17 May 1918), son of Kujō Hisatada and adopted son of Takatsukasa Sukehiro, was a kazoku Duke of the Meiji period who served in Imperial Japanese Army. Nobusuke and Nobuhiro were his sons.

== Family ==
His son, Nobusuke (1889–1959), a politician and ornithologist who became head priest of the Meiji Shrine, was himself father of Toshimichi Takatsukasa (d. 1966), who was married to Kazuko Takatsukasa (1929–1989; formerly Kazuko, Princess Taka). They had no children, but adopted a son named Naotake from the Ogyū-Matsudaira family.
