= Matsudaira Chikauji =

Samurai of the early Muromachi period

- 松平親氏
- Died: 1393
- Relatives: Tokugawa Arichika (biological father), Nobushige Matsudaira (adopted father)

Matsudaira Chikarauji (松平親氏, died 1393) was a Japanese feudal lord in the early Muromachi period, who was the lord of Matsudaira in Mikawa Province. He was the founder of the Matsudaira clan and the Tokugawa clan who is recorded in the Edo period genealogy Matsudaira-shi Yuishogaki.

== Life ==
His paternal lineage is said to be descended from the Shinden Genji Serada clan. The fourth son of Niida Yoshishige, Yoshiki, lived in Nitta-sho Tokugawa and called himself Tokugawa. Yoshiki's second son was Yoriji, who was named Yashiro Sarada and became the governor of Mikawa. His second son was Jiro Noriji, Noriji's son was Matajiro Ietoki, and Ietoki's son was Yajiro Mitsuyoshi. After Mitsuyoshi, he was succeeded by Masayoshi, Chikaki, and Arichika, and Arichika's son was Chikara'.

However, Japanese historian Watanabe Seisuke has argued that Tokugawa Ieyasu connected the Serada clan's genealogy with his own in 1566. In today's academic world, it is commonly believed that the genealogy was embellished by Ieyasu. However, Ieyasu's grandfather Matsudaira Kiyoyasu had already called himself the Serada clan, and Ieyasu is thought to have been influenced by him.

Chikara was defeated in the Kanto (or Shinano Province) by the forces of the Kamakura kōkata (or Shiba clan), and became a member of the Ashikaga clan, he was defeated by the forces of Kamakura lord (or Shiba clan), and to avoid Ashikaga clan capture, he entered Shōjōkō-ji, the head temple of the Toki sect, in Sagami Province with his father Arichika, and was ordained as a priest. He is sometimes described as "a Beggar monk" or "a kind of Lowborn". However, it has been revealed by Masuo Sembon that the story of rakugo at Seikouji Temple was not told until after the Genroku period, after the establishment of the "Butoku Taiseiki", and is considered to have been created in later times.

Tokuami's subordinate, Magosaburo Ishikawa, Shomyoji Sakki and Yugyo and Fujisawa Shonin no Rekishi Keifu. The name of Magosaburo Ishikawa appears as his companion. He became a guest of Matsudaira Nobushige (Ensign Tarozaemon), the lord of the area who was descended from the Zaihara clan or Kamo clan. Nobushige took Tokuami as his son-in-law because of his knowledge of waka poetry and his bravery, and Tokuami returned to secular life and took the name Matsudaira Tarozaemon Lieutenant Chikashi.

"In the "History of the Matsudaira Clan," when Nobushige asked him about his ancestry, he replied, "I am a wanderer who travels from east to west, and I am ashamed to say so. Here, the Chikara is described as a person whose identity is unknown.

After becoming the lord of Matsudaira, he built Goshiki Castle and became a legitimate son (according to the sibling theory In cooperation with Yasuchika, who is said to be his eldest son, he destroyed the neighboring lords called "Nakayama Shichina" and expanded his power, laying the foundation of the Matsudaira clan, a feudal lord. However, based on the description in the "History of the Matsudaira Clan," there is a theory that he actually acquired the land through purchase.

He built many shrines and temples in his territory, including Kogetsuin, his family temple, and did not spare any assistance to the poor people.

In addition to the aforementioned arguments, there is also a theory that doubts the existence of the second generation of the Matsudaira clan, Chikashi and Yasuchika, because their names cannot be found in historical documents of the same period.

== The year of his birth and death ==
According to the "History of the Matsudaira Clan", Chikara seems to have died suddenly. There are various theories about the year of birth and death of Chikara, and it has not reached the stage of a definite theory. According to the Folklore of the local town of Matsudaira (Toyota City), he died around the fourth year of the Meitoku reign (1393), and in the fifth year of the Heisei reign (1993), the 600th anniversary of his death was celebrated. In Heisei 5 (1993), Toyota City held the "600th Anniversary of Prince Chikaga" to commemorate the 600th anniversary of his death. As part of the event, a national seminar for castle researchers was held.

There are ten different traditions of the date of Chikara's death

- Kōan first year (1361), April 20 ("Hōzō-ji history", "Daiju-ji records", "Okuhira family records")
- Oei first year (1394) April 20 ("Mikawa Kaitōki")
- 1394 April 24 ("Kogetsuinki")
- Onei 20th year (1413) ("Shinkomyoji Enki")
- Onei 21 (1414 years) ("Matsudaira So Keifu")
- Onei 28 (1421) ("Sanyo Matsudaira Gidenki")
- Eikyō 35nen (1428nen) ("Toei Kan")
- Eikyō 9 (1437 years) ("Takimura Manshoji Genealogy" and "Ryōzan Myōshōji tablets")
- Kōshō2 (1456) ("Dai Mikawa Shi")
- Onin first year (1467 years), April 20 ("Chronicles of the Tokugawa")

There are several theories for the year of his birth, such as Einin 6th year (1298) ("Daijuji Records") and Genkō 2nd year/Shōkei 1st year (1332) ("Kogetsuin Historical Records").

== Relationship with Sakai clan ==
According to the genealogy of the Sakai clan, who later became a chief vassal of the Matsudaira clan, the founder of the clan, Hirochika, was the son-in-law of the lord of Sakai village in Hekikai County, Mikawa Province, before he succeeded the Matsudaira clan. According to this theory, the Sakai clan is a member of the Matsudaira clan. However, according to the research of Akio Hirano, the Sakai clan arose when the eldest daughter of Matsudaira Nobushige married into Sakai-go. In any case, the Matsudaira and Sakai clans are related.

== Sources ==
- Hirano, Akio (2002), Mikawa Matsudaira Ichi, New People Correspondence, ISBN 4-404-02961-6
