= Tokugawa Memorial Foundation =

Japanese foundation

- Founded: 2003
- Founder: Tokugawa Tsunenari
- Type: Non-operating private foundation
- Location: 2-35-5 Uehara, Shibuya-ku, Tokyo
- Key people: President - Tokugawa Tsunenari
- Website: Tokugawa.ne.jp

The Tokugawa Memorial Foundation (Japanese: 徳川記念財団) was established in late 2003. Its objective is to preserve and administer the historical objects, art, armor and documents that have been passed down in the Tokugawa family over the generations, display them for the general public and provide assistance to academic research on topics concerning historical Japan.

The president of the foundation is Tokugawa Tsunenari, 18th head of the Tokugawa clan.
