= Ogimachi Sanemasa =

Japanese courtier and pharmacist

Count Ogimachi Sanemasa
- 正親町 実正
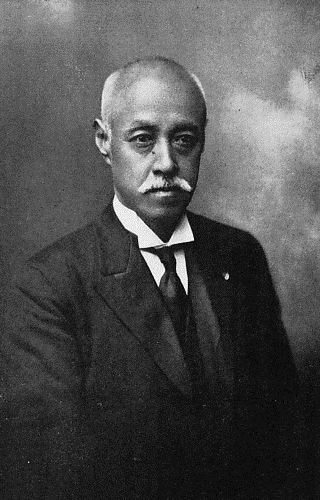
- Ogimachi in 1913

Grand Chamberlain to the Emperor
- In office 27 May 1918 – 22 March 1922
- Monarch: Taishō
- Preceded by: Takatsukasa Hiromichi
- Succeeded by: Tokugawa Satotaka

Member of the House of Peers
- In office 10 July 1890 – 31 May 1918 Elected by the Counts

Governor of Saitama Prefecture
- In office 21 February 1899 – 25 October 1900
- Monarch: Meiji
- Preceded by: Hagiwara Hiroe
- Succeeded by: Yamada Shunzō

Personal details
- Born: 20 July 1855
- Died: 26 June 1923 (aged 67)
- Education: Tokyo Imperial University

Count Ōgimachi Sanemasa (Japanese: 正親町実正; 20 July 1855 – 26 June 1923) was a Japanese courtier and pharmacist who served as Grand Chamberlain to the Emperor from 1919 to 1922.

Born to a prestigious kuge family, his father was an imperial counsellor and his aunt the biological mother of Emperor Kōmei. He was the governor of Saitama Prefecture (1899–1900). He was a recipient of the Order of the Sacred Treasure. He was made a count in 1884, a recipient of the Order of the Rising Sun, 4th class in 1906, a recipient of the Order of the Sacred Treasure in 1910 and a recipient of the World War I Victory Medal in 1915.

Preceded by Takatsukasa Hiromichi	Grand Chamberlain to the Emperor; 1919–1922	Succeeded by Tokugawa Satotaka
Preceded by Hagiwara Hiroe	Governor of Saitama Prefecture; 1899–1900	Succeeded by Yamada Shunzō
