= Tokuhisa Tsunenori =

Japanese politician

- 徳久 恒範
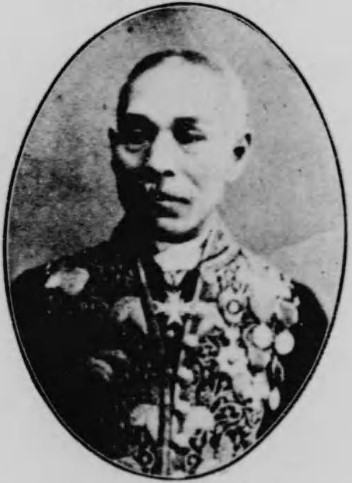

Member of the House of Peers
- In office 22 August 1904 – 30 December 1910 Nominated by the Emperor
Gubernatorial offices
Governor of Hiroshima Prefecture
In office 29 June 1903 – 25 January 1904
Monarch	Meiji
Preceded by	Egi Kazuyuki
Succeeded by	Yamada Shunzō
Governor of Kumamoto Prefecture
In office 28 July 1898 – 29 June 1903
Monarch	Meiji
Preceded by	Ōura Kanetake
Succeeded by	Egi Kazuyuki
Governor of Kagawa Prefecture
In office 11 April 1896 – 28 July 1898
Monarch	Meiji
Preceded by	Ichizō Fukano
Succeeded by	Ono Ryūsuke
Governor of Toyama Prefecture
In office 20 August 1892 – 11 April 1896
Monarch	Meiji
Preceded by	Shigeru Moriyama
Succeeded by	Andō Kensuke

Personal details
- Born: 16 February 1844
- Died: 30 December 1910 (aged 66)
- Relatives: Teiichi Suzuki (son-in-law)

Tokuhisa Tsunenori (徳久 恒範; 16 February 1844 – 30 December 1910) was a Japanese politician who served as governor of Hiroshima Prefecture from June 1903 to January 1904. He was also governor of Toyama Prefecture (1892–1896), Kagawa Prefecture (1896–1898) and Kumamoto Prefecture (1898–1903).

Preceded by Ōura Kanetake	Governor of Kumamoto Prefecture; 1898-1903	Succeeded by Egi Kazuyuki
Preceded by Egi Kazuyuki	Governor of Hiroshima Prefecture; 1903–1904	Succeeded by Yamada Shunzō
