= Kazuko Takatsukasa =

Former Japanese princess (1929–1989)

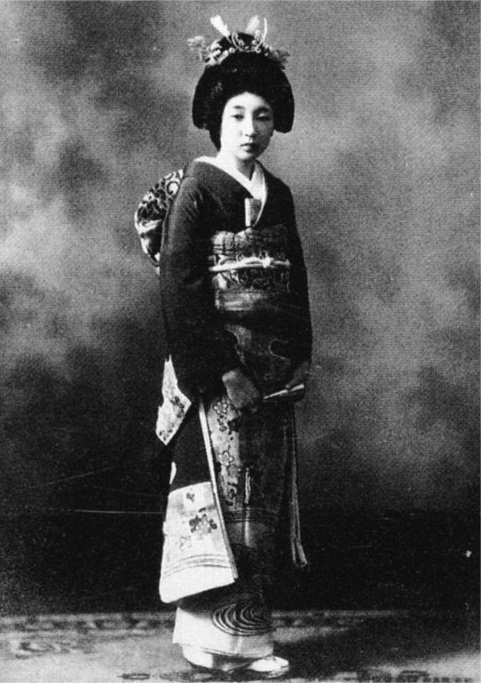
- Kazuko Takatsukasa, c. 1950
- Born: Kazuko, Princess Taka (孝宮和子内親王); 30 September 1929; Tokyo Imperial Palace, Tokyo City, Empire of Japan
- Died: 26 May 1989 (aged 59); Tokyo, Japan
- Resting place: Nison-in, Ukyō-ku, Kyoto
- Spouse: Toshimichi Takatsukasa (m. 1950; died 1966)
- Children: Naotake Takatsukasa (adopted)
- Parents: Emperor Shōwa (father); Princess Nagako Kuni (mother)
- Relatives: Imperial House of Japan

Kazuko Takatsukasa (鷹司 和子, Takatsukasa Kazuko; 30 September 1929 – 26 May 1989), formerly Kazuko, Princess Taka (孝宮和子内親王, Taka-no-miya Kazuko Naishinnō), was the third daughter of Emperor Shōwa and Empress Kōjun. She was an elder sister to Emperor Emeritus Akihito, and paternal aunt to Emperor Naruhito. She married Toshimichi Takatsukasa on 21 May 1950. As a result, she gave up her imperial title and left the Japanese Imperial Family, as required by law.

== Biography ==
Princess Taka was born at the Tokyo Imperial Palace. Her childhood appellation was Taka-no-miya (孝宮). As was the practice of the time, she was not raised by her biological parents, but by a succession of court ladies at a separate palace built for her and her younger sisters in the Marunouchi district of Tokyo. She graduated from the Gakushuin Peer's School in March 1948, and spent a year in the household of former Chamberlain of Japan Saburo Hyakutake learning skills to be a bride.

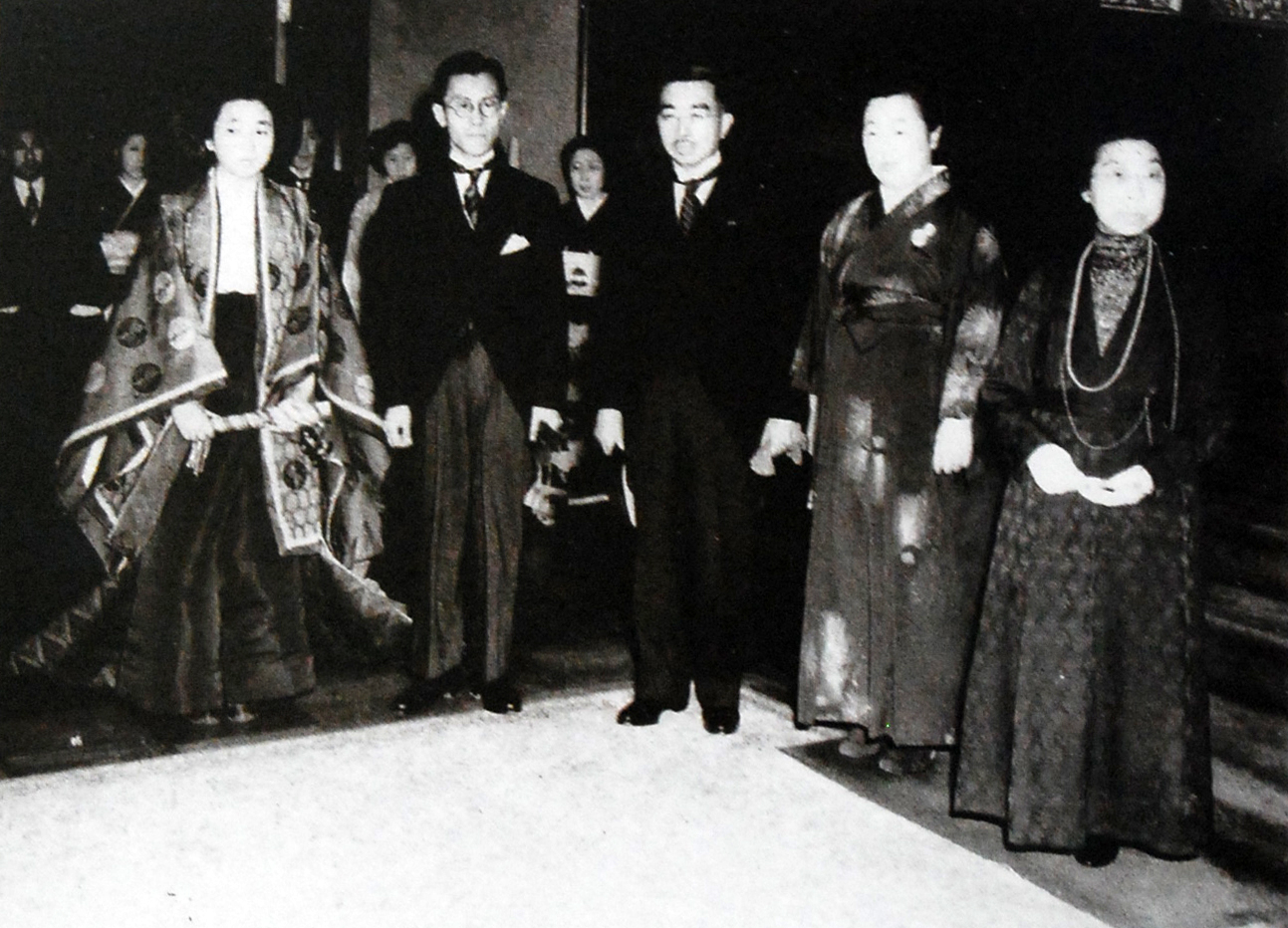
The Princess and her husband, parents and grandmother on their wedding day. From left to right: Princess Kazuko, Toshimichi Takatsukasa, Emperor Hirohito, Empress Nagako, Empress Dowager Sadako (20 May 1950)

On 20 May 1950, she married Toshimichi Takatsukasa, the eldest son of former Prince and guji of Meiji Shrine, Nobusuke Takatsukasa. The marriage received much publicity as it was the first marriage of a member of the imperial family to a commoner. Though legally commoners following the Second World War, the Takatsukasa family had been part of the ancient court nobility (kuge), with the peerage title of Prince in the pre-war kazoku peerage (and would therefore have been considered a traditional family for an Imperial marriage). Nobusuke Takatsukasa was the first cousin of Empress Teimei through his father Takatsukasa Hiromichi, making his son and daughter-in-law second cousins once removed (as the groom's grandfather and the bride's great-grandfather were siblings).

On 28 January 1966, Toshimichi Takatsukasa was found dead of carbon monoxide poisoning at the apartment of his mistress, Michiko Maeda, a Ginza nightclub hostess, giving rise to widely speculative rumors in the Japanese press about his alleged double suicide. After her husband's death, Kazuko's misfortunes continued, as seven months later, on 22 August 1966, a knife-wielding intruder broke into her home in the middle of the night and assaulted her, causing injuries to her right and left hands and resulting in hospitalization for one week. A shocked Emperor Shōwa ordered that she relocate to within the Akasaka Estate in Akasaka, Tokyo, where she lived until her death of heart failure at the age of 59, four months after her father died.

From 1974 to 1988 she served as chief priestess (saishu) of Ise Grand Shrine, taking over the role from her great-aunt Fusako Kitashirakawa.

The Takatsukasas had no biological children due to a miscarriage in 1955 but adopted a son from the Ogyū-Matsudaira family, Naotake (born 1945), who would become president of Japan Telecommunications System Corporation (NEC Communication Systems) and head priest of the Ise Jingu Shrine; since 2022 he has been chairman of Kasumi Kaikan, an association for former kazoku, and a director of the Wild Bird Society of Japan, amongst other positions. Naotake's heir as head of the Takatsukasa family is his son, Naomichi (born 1974).

== Ancestry ==
Ancestors of Kazuko Takatsukasa

8. Mutsuhito, Emperor Meiji
4. Yoshihito, Emperor Taishō
9. Lady Naruko Yanagiwara
2. Hirohito, Emperor Shōwa
10. Prince Kujō Michitaka of the Fujiwara Clan
5. Lady Sadako Kujō
11. Lady Ikuko Noma
1. Kazuko, Princess Taka
12. Asahiko, 1st Imperial Prince Kuni
6. Kuniyoshi, 2nd Imperial Prince Kuni
13. Lady Makiko Izumi
3. Princess Nagako of Kuni
14. Prince Shimazu Tadayoshi
7. Princess Chikako Shimazu
15. Lady Sumako Yamazaki

== Gallery ==
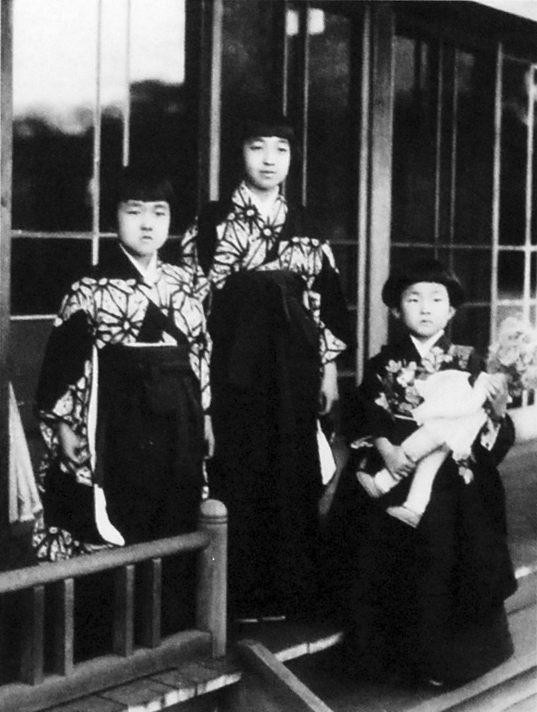
Princess Kazuko and her sisters

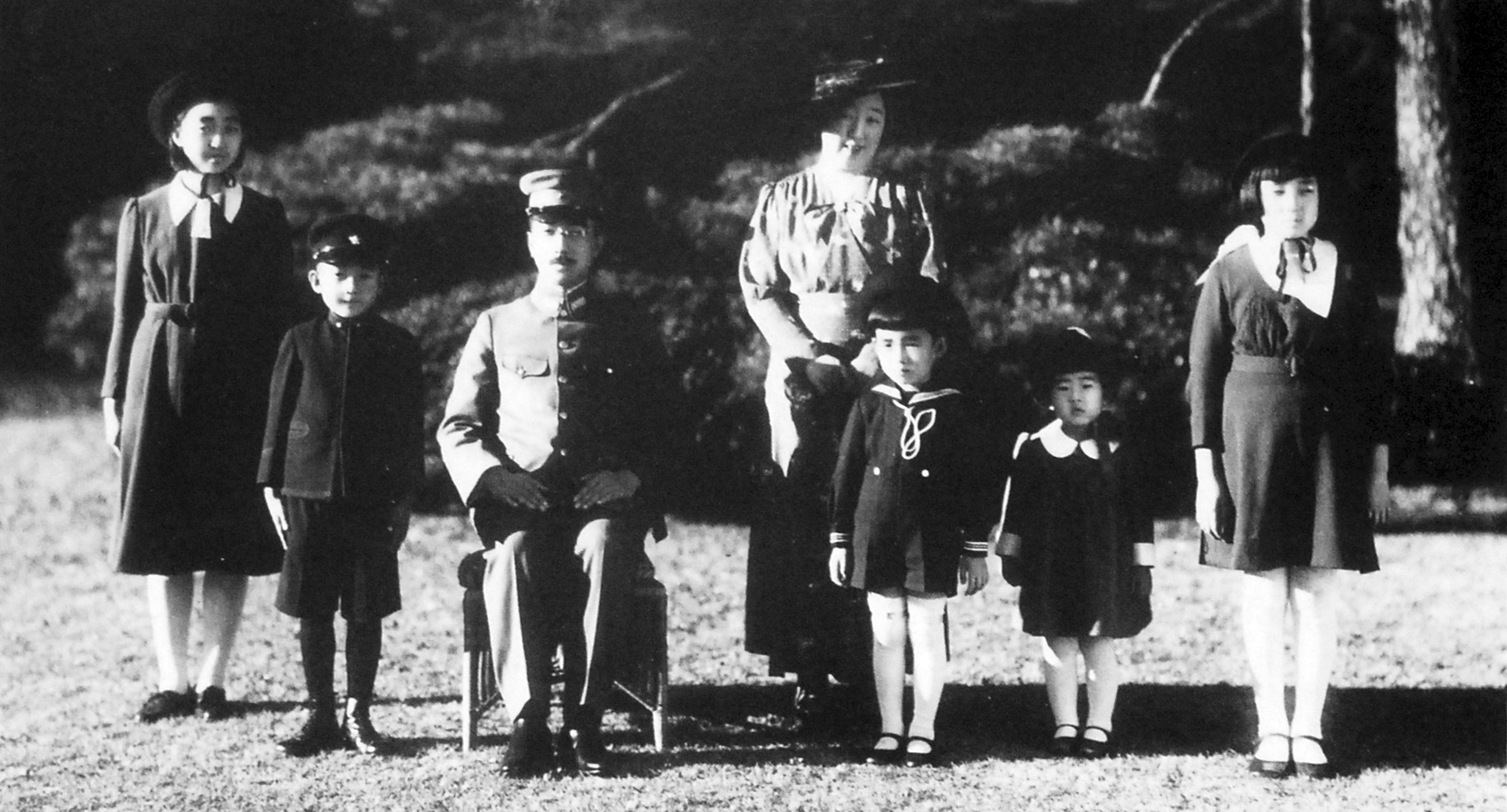
Emperor Shōwa's family in 1945

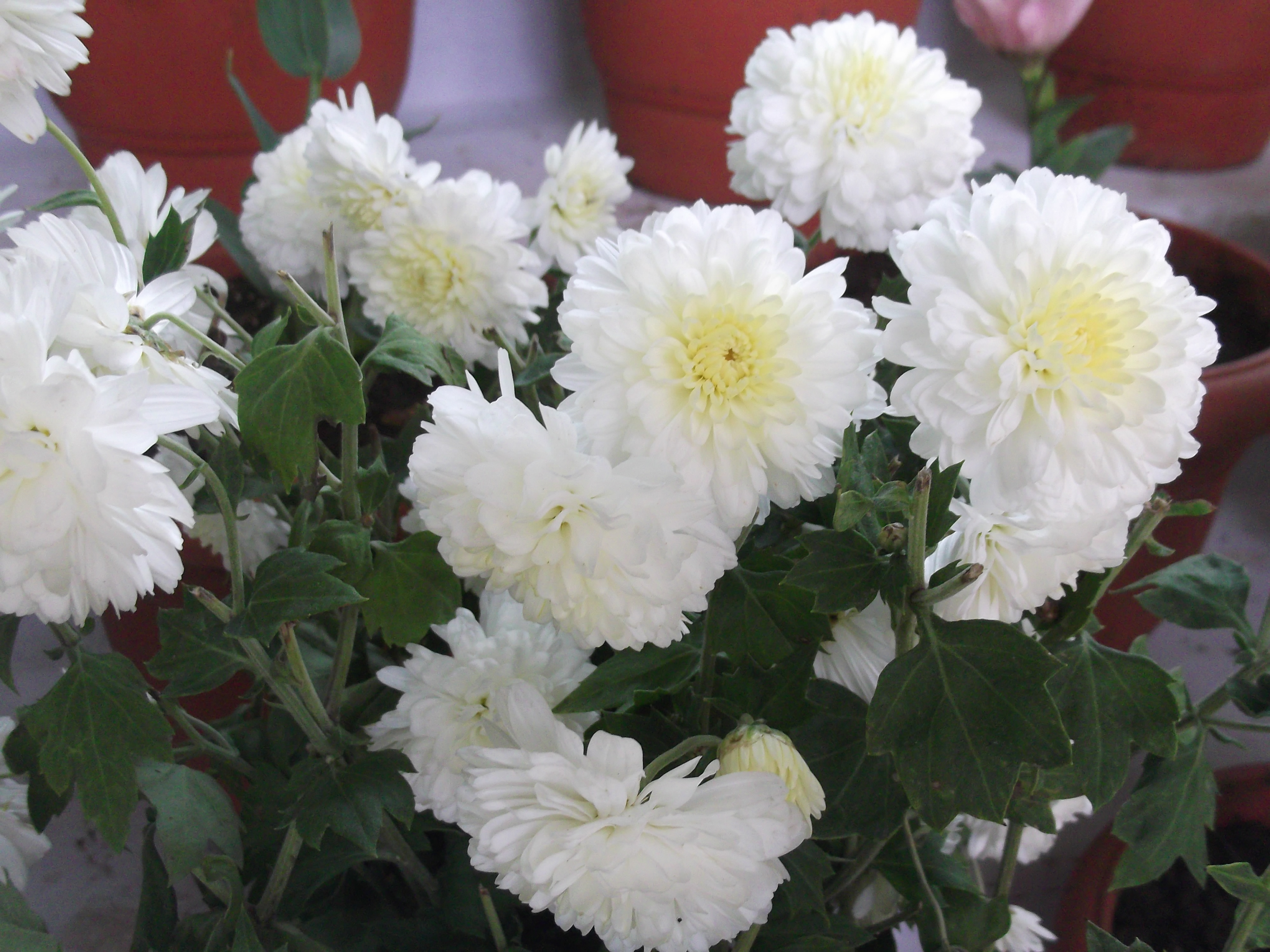
White Chrysanthemum × morifolium, designated imperial personal emblem of Kazuko

== Sources ==
- Takie Sugiyama Lebra, Above the Clouds: Status Culture of the Modern Japanese Nobility (Berkeley: University of California Press, 1992).
- Bix, Herbert P. (2001). Hirohito and the Making of Modern Japan. Harper Perennial. ISBN 0-06-093130-2.
