= Yamada Shunzō =

Japanese politician

- 山田 春三
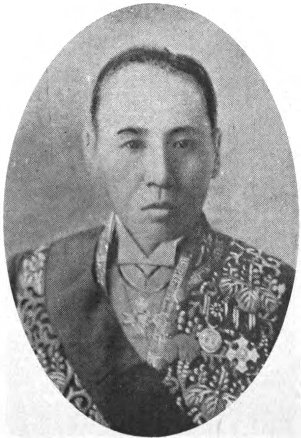

Member of the House of Peers
- In office 15 December 1906 – 13 September 1921 Nominated by the Emperor
Gubernatorial offices
Governor of Hiroshima Prefecture
In office 25 January 1904 – 11 January 1907
Monarch	Meiji
Preceded by	Tokuhisa Tsunenori
Succeeded by	Tadashi Munakata
Governor of Shizuoka Prefecture
In office 8 February 1902 – 25 January 1904
Monarch	Meiji
Preceded by	Shiba Sankuro
Succeeded by	Eizaburō Kamei
Governor of Saitama Prefecture
In office 25 October 1900 – 8 February 1902
Monarch	Meiji
Preceded by	Ogimachi Sanemasa
Succeeded by	Shūichi Kinoshita
Governor of Fukushima Prefecture
In office 14 April 1898 – 25 October 1900
Monarch	Meiji
Preceded by	Kanemichi Anraku
Succeeded by	Arita Yoshisuke

Personal details
- Born: 31 July 1846 Abu, Nagato, Japan
- Died: 13 September 1921 (aged 75)

Yamada Shunzō (山田 春三; 31 July 1846 – 13 September 1921) was a Japanese politician who served as governor of Hiroshima Prefecture from 1904 to 1907. He was also governor of Fukushima Prefecture (1898–1900), Saitama Prefecture (1900–1902) and Shizuoka Prefecture (1902–1904). He was a recipient of the Order of the Rising Sun.

Preceded by Ogimachi Sanemasa	Governor of Saitama Prefecture; 1900-1902	Succeeded by Shuichi Kinoshita
Preceded by Tokuhisa Tsunenori	Governor of Hiroshima Prefecture; 1904–1907	Succeeded by Tadashi Munakata
