= Tokugawa Yoshinobu =

Japanese samurai and Military ruler from 1866 to 1868 (1837–1913)

Prince Yoshinobu Tokugawa
- 德川 慶喜
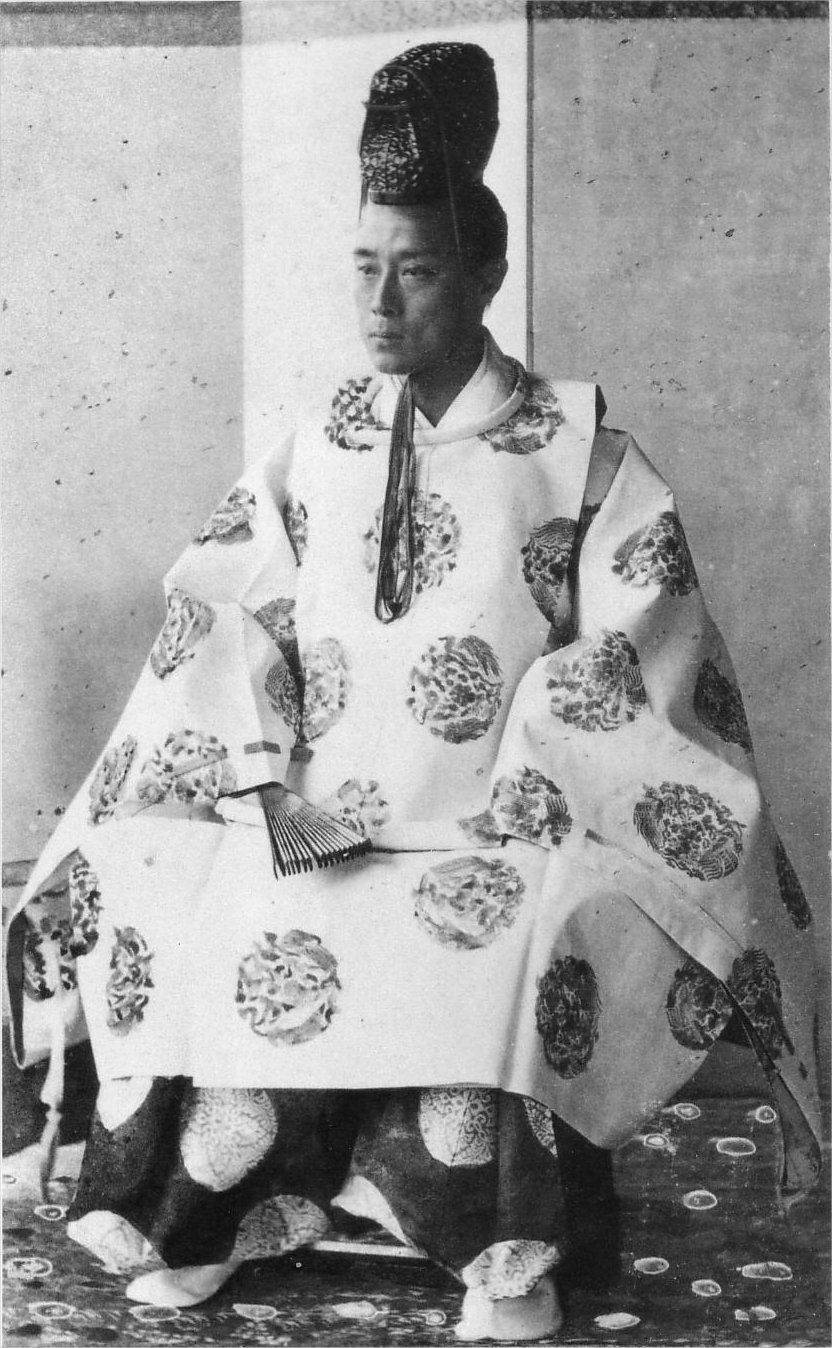
- Tokugawa in 1867

Shōgun
- In office 10 January 1867 – 3 January 1868
- Monarchs: Kōmei; Meiji
- Preceded by: Tokugawa Iemochi
- Succeeded by: Position abolished

Head of the Tokugawa clan
- In office October 1866 – June 1868
- Preceded by: Tokugawa Iemochi
- Succeeded by: Tokugawa Iesato

Member of the House of Peers
- In office 3 June 1902 – 8 December 1910

Personal details
- Born: 28 October 1837 Edo, Tokugawa Shogunate, Japan,
- Died: 22 November 1913 (aged 76) Koishikawa, Tokyo, Empire of Japan
- Resting place: Yanaka Cemetery
- Spouse: Ichijō Mikako
- Parents: Tokugawa Nariaki (father); Arisugawa Yoshiko (mother)
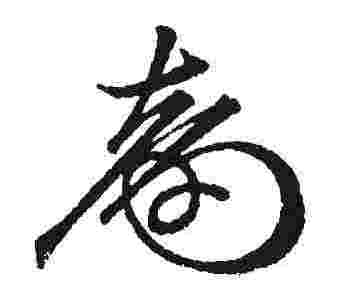
- Signature

Prince Yoshinobu Tokugawa (Note: also known as Keiki and Yoshihisa) (Japanese: 德川 慶喜, Hepburn: Tokugawa Yoshinobu; 28 October 1837 – 22 November 1913) was a Japanese samurai, daimyo and the 15th and last shōgun of the Tokugawa shogunate. He was part of a movement which aimed to reform the aging shogunate, but was ultimately unsuccessful. He resigned his position as shogun in late 1867, while aiming at keeping some political influence. After these efforts failed following the defeat at the Battle of Toba–Fushimi in early 1868, he went into retirement, and largely avoided the public eye for the rest of his life. Despite his fall from power, he was later raised to a prince, the highest title of nobility in the new Japanese peerage.

== Early life ==
Tokugawa Yoshinobu was born in Edo as the seventh son of Tokugawa Nariaki, daimyō of Mito. Mito was one of the gosanke, the three branch families of the Tokugawa clan which were eligible to be chosen as shōgun. His birth name was Matsudaira Shichirōmaro (松平七郎麻呂) His mother, Princess Arisugawa Yoshiko, was a member of the Arisugawa-no-miya, a cadet branch of the imperial family; through her, he was a third cousin (once removed) of the then-Emperor Ninkō. Shichirōmaro was brought up under strict supervision and tutelage. His father Nariaki followed the example of the second Mito daimyo, Tokugawa Mitsukuni (1661–1690), who had sent all his sons after the firstborn to be raised in Mito. Shichirōmaro was seven months old when he arrived in Mito in 1838. He was taught in the literary and martial arts, as well as receiving a solid education in the principles of politics and government at Kōdōkan.

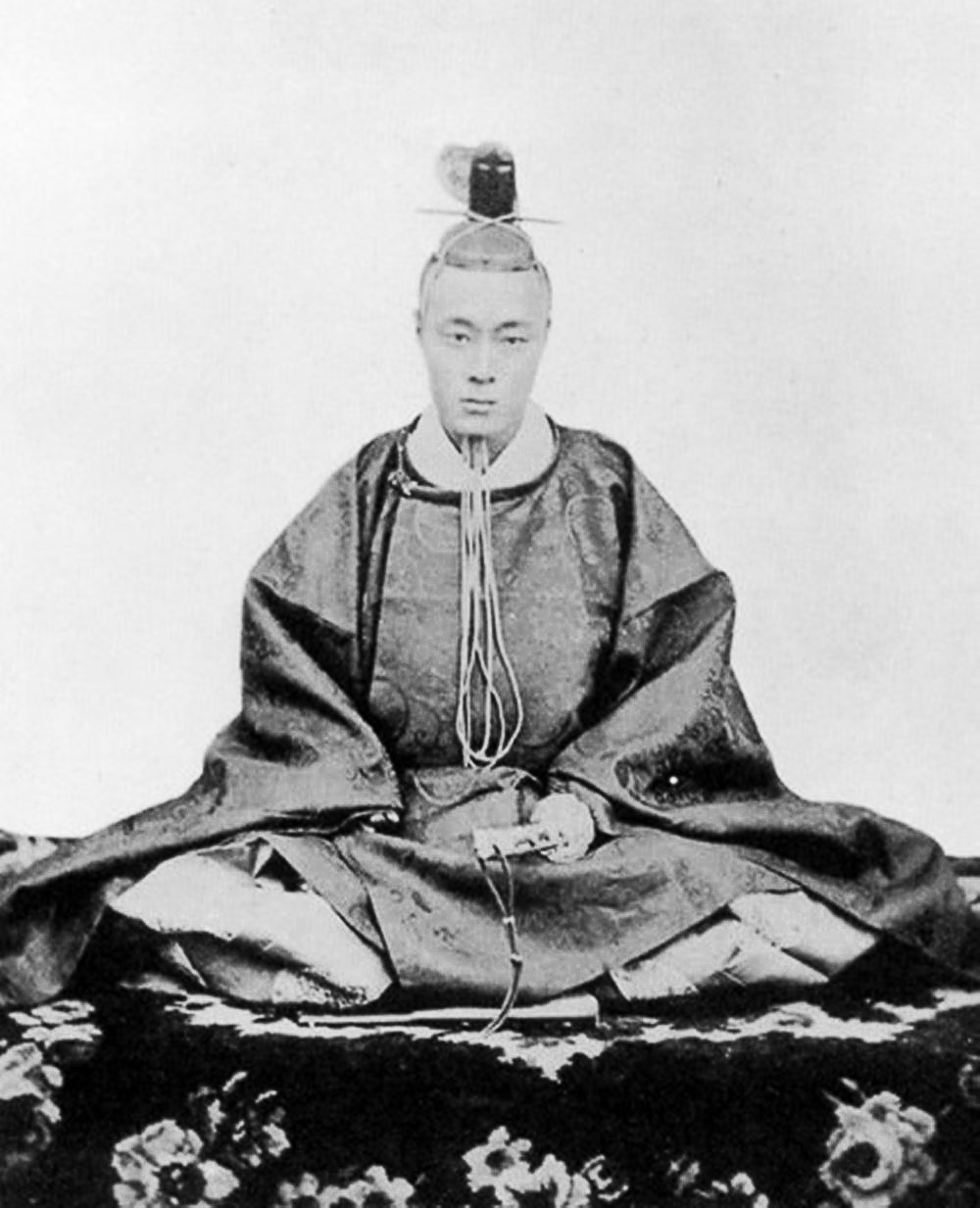
Yoshinobu in ceremonial dress

At the instigation of his father, Shichirōmaro was adopted by the Hitotsubashi-Tokugawa family in order to have a better chance of succeeding to the shogunate and changed his first name to Akimune (昭致). He became family head in 1847, coming of age that year, receiving court rank and title, and taking the name Yoshinobu. Upon the death of the 13th shōgun, Iesada, in 1858, Yoshinobu was nominated as a potential successor. His supporters touted his skill and efficiency in managing family affairs. However, the opposing faction, led by Ii Naosuke, won out. Their candidate, the young Tokugawa Yoshitomi, was chosen, and became the 14th shōgun Iemochi. Soon after, during the Ansei Purge, Yoshinobu and others who supported him were placed under house arrest. Yoshinobu himself was made to retire from Hitotsubashi headship.

The period of Ii's domination of the Tokugawa government was marked by mismanagement and political infighting. Upon Ii's assassination in 1860, Yoshinobu was reinstated as Hitotsubashi family head, and was nominated in 1862 to be the shōgun's guardian (将軍後見職, shōgun kōken-shoku), receiving the position soon afterwards. At the same time, his two closest allies, Matsudaira Yoshinaga and Matsudaira Katamori, were appointed to other high positions: Yoshinaga as chief of political affairs (政治総裁職, seiji sōsai shoku), Katamori as Guardian of Kyoto (京都守護職, Kyoto Shugoshoku). The three men then took numerous steps to quell political unrest in the Kyoto area, and gathered allies to counter the activities of the rebellious Chōshū Domain. They were instrumental figures in the kōbu gattai political party, which sought a reconciliation between the shogunate and the imperial court.

In 1864, Yoshinobu, as commander of the imperial palace's defense, defeated the Chōshū forces in their attempt to capture the imperial palace's Hamaguri Gate (蛤御門, Hamaguri-Gomon) in what is called the Kinmon Incident. This was achieved by use of the forces of the Aizu–Satsuma coalition.

== Shōgun (1867–1868) ==
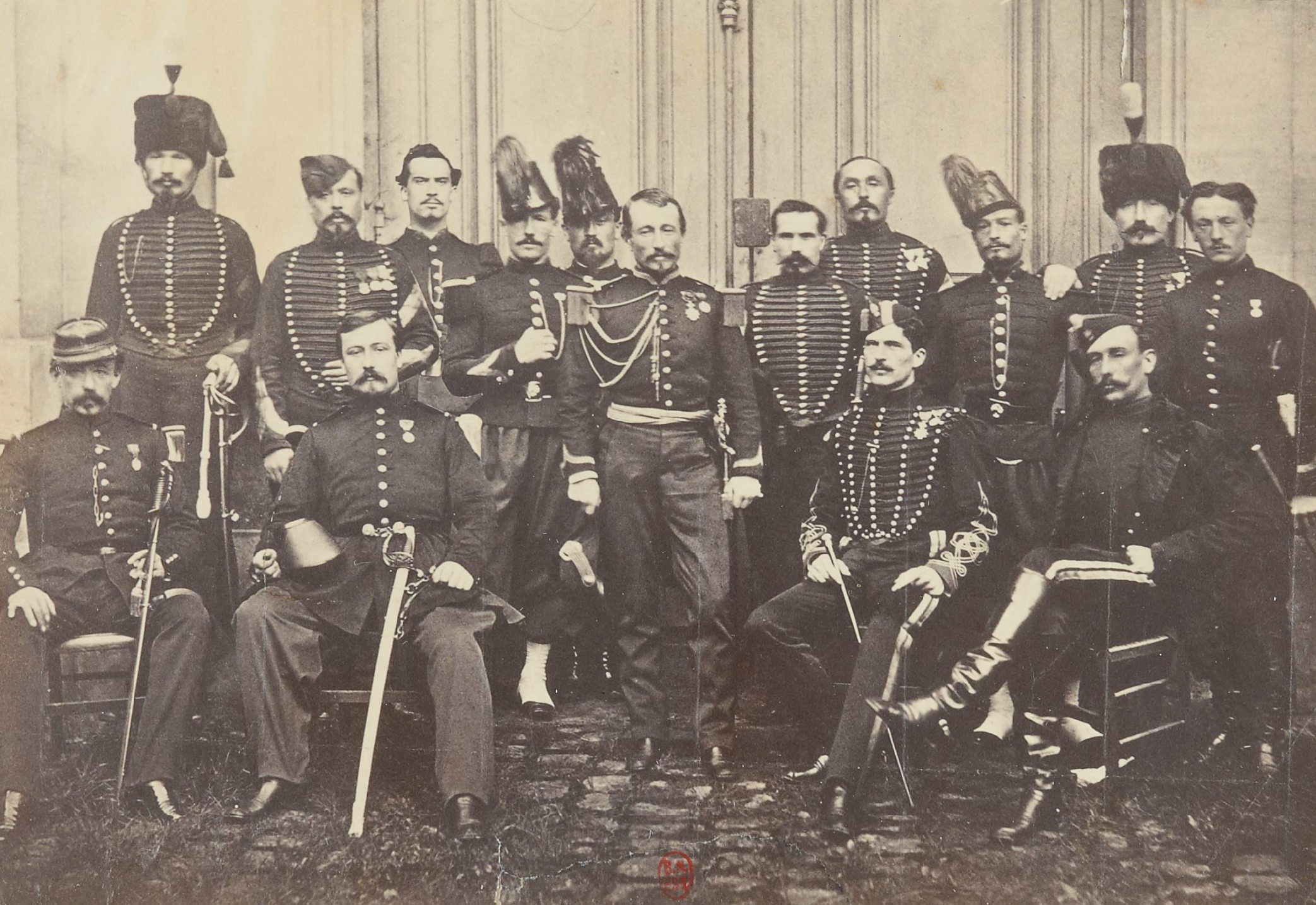
Members of the French military mission to Japan, invited by Tokugawa Yoshinobu for the modernization of his forces, in 1867

Shōgun Tokugawa Iemochi died without issue in August 1866. In his will, he named Tokugawa Kamenosuke of the Tayasu branch as heir, but since he was only a child and the shogunate was in the middle of a war, shogunal officials and vassals decided to nominate Yoshinobu instead. Yoshinobu initially declined. After strong persuasion from the Rōjū Itakura Katsukiyo and others he became head of the Tokugawa main family in October, while continuing to refuse the title of shōgun until January 1867.

Tokugawa Yoshinobu was the only Tokugawa shōgun to spend his entire tenure outside of Edo: he never set foot in Edo Castle as shōgun. Immediately upon his ascension, major changes were initiated. A massive government overhaul was undertaken to initiate reforms that would strengthen the Tokugawa government. In particular, assistance from the Second French Empire was organized, with the construction of the Yokosuka arsenal under Léonce Verny, and the dispatch of a French military mission to modernize the armies of the bakufu.

The national army and navy, which had already been formed under Tokugawa command, were strengthened by the assistance of the Russians, and the Tracey Mission provided by the British Royal Navy. Equipment was also purchased from the United States. The outlook among many was that the Tokugawa Shogunate was gaining ground towards renewed strength and power; however, it fell in less than a year.

== Boshin War (1868–1869) ==
Fearing the renewed strengthening of the Tokugawa shogunate under a strong and wise ruler, samurai from Satsuma, Chōshū and Tosa formed an alliance to counter it. Under the banner of sonnō jōi ("revere the Emperor, expel the barbarians!") coupled with a fear of the new shōgun as the "Rebirth of Ieyasu" (家康の再来) who would continue to usurp the power of the Emperor, they worked to bring about an end to the shogunate, though they varied in their approaches. In particular, Tosa was more moderate; it proposed a compromise whereby Yoshinobu would resign as shōgun, but preside over a new national governing council composed of various daimyōs. To this end, Yamanouchi Toyonori, the lord of Tosa, together with his advisor, Gotō Shōjirō, petitioned Yoshinobu to resign in order to make this possible.

On 9 November 1867, Yoshinobu tendered his resignation to the Emperor and formally stepped down ten days later, returning governing power to the Emperor. He then withdrew from Kyoto to Osaka. However, Satsuma and Chōshū, while supportive of a governing council of daimyōs, were opposed to Yoshinobu's leading it. They secretly obtained an imperial edict calling for the use of force against Yoshinobu (later shown to be a forgery) and moved a massive number of Satsuma and Chōshū troops into Kyoto. There was a meeting called at the imperial court, where Yoshinobu was stripped of all titles and land, despite having taken no action that could be construed as aggressive or criminal. Any who would have opposed this were not included in the meeting. Yoshinobu opposed this action, and composed a message of protest, to be delivered to the imperial court; at the urging of the leaders of Aizu, Kuwana, and other domains, and in light of the immense number of Satsuma and Chōshū troops in Kyoto, he dispatched a large body of troops to convey this message to the court.

When the Tokugawa forces arrived outside Kyoto, they were refused entry, and were attacked by Satsuma and Chōshū troops, starting the Battle of Toba–Fushimi, the first clash of the Boshin War. Though the Tokugawa forces had a distinct advantage in numbers, Yoshinobu abandoned his army in the midst of the fight once he realized the Satsuma and Chōshū forces raised the Imperial banner, and escaped to Edo. He placed himself under voluntary confinement, and indicated his submission to the imperial court. However, a peace agreement was reached wherein Tayasu Kamenosuke, the young head of a branch of the Tokugawa family, was adopted and made Tokugawa family head; On 11 April 1868, Edo Castle was handed over to the imperial army, and the city spared from all-out war.

Together with Kamenosuke (who took the name Tokugawa Iesato), Yoshinobu moved to Shizuoka. Tokugawa Ieyasu, founder of the Tokugawa Shogunate, had also retired to Shizuoka, centuries earlier. Iesato was made the daimyō of the new Shizuoka Domain, but lost this title a few years later, when the domains were abolished. Even after losing his position as ruling shogun, Yoshinobu strove to promote his son Iesato's political career so that he could attain the highest level of influence in the Japanese Imperial court, and also serve as a bridge between old world Japan and modern emerging Japan both domestically and internationally. The close relationship between father and son is highlighted in the illustrated biography on Prince Tokugawa Iesato titled The Art of Peace.

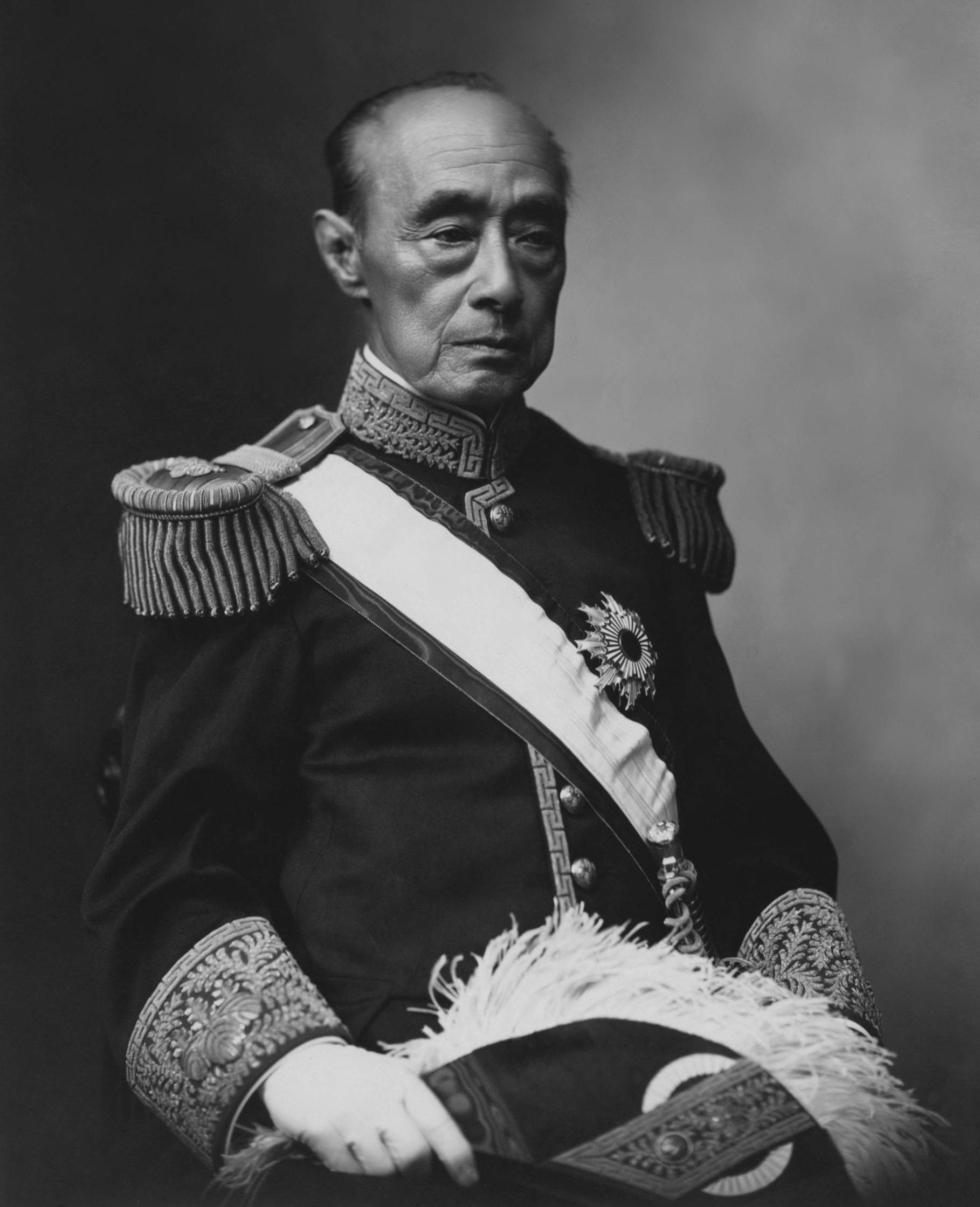
Tokugawa Yoshinobu in court uniform

Many of the hatamoto also relocated to Shizuoka; a large proportion of them did not find adequate means to support themselves. As a result, many of them resented Yoshinobu, some of them to the point of wanting him dead. Yoshinobu was aware of this, and was so afraid of assassination that he redesigned his sleeping arrangement to confuse any potential assassin.

== Later life ==
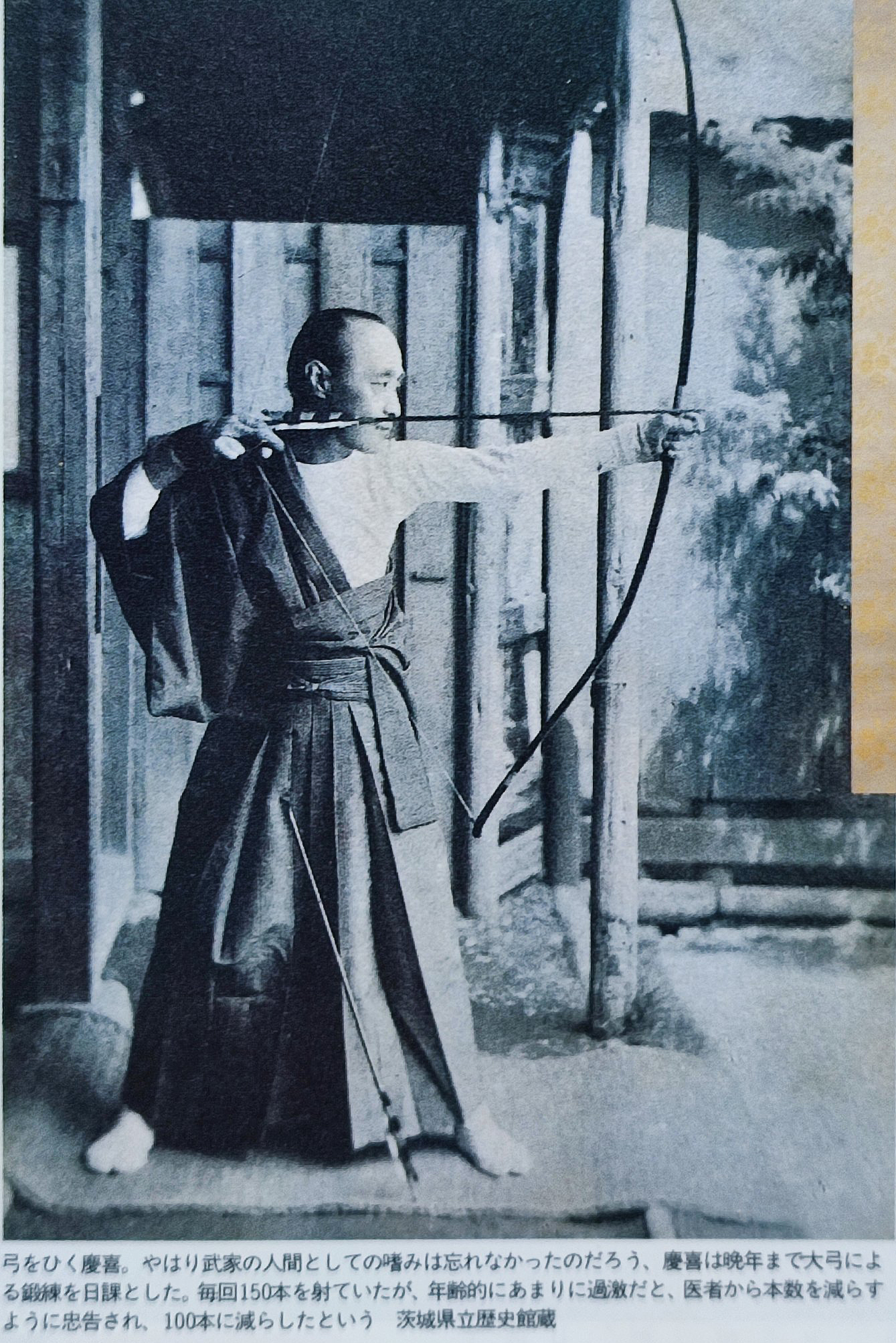
Kyūdō was one of his elaborate hobbies, and it is said that he continued to draw a bow every day until the spring of his 77th year.

Living a life in quiet retirement, Yoshinobu indulged in many hobbies, including oil painting, kyūdō (archery), hunting, photography, and cycling. Some of Yoshinobu's photographs have been published in recent years by his great-grandson, Yoshitomo. His other great-grandson, Yasuhisa Tokugawa of the Mito line, is the former Chief Priest at Yasukuni Shrine and current Kaicho of the Kokusai Budoin (IMAF).

On 3 June 1902, the Emperor Meiji allowed him to re-establish his own house as a Tokugawa branch (bekke) with the highest rank in the peerage, that of prince (kōshaku), for his loyal service to Japan. He took a seat in the House of Peers, and resigned in 1910. Tokugawa Yoshinobu died on 21 November 1913 and is buried in Yanaka Cemetery, Tokyo.

On 9 January 1896, his ninth daughter Tsuneko Tokugawa (1882–1939) married Prince Fushimi Hiroyasu, a second cousin to both Emperor Hirohito and Empress Kōjun and nephew of Prince Kan'in Kotohito.

On 26 December 1911, his granddaughter Kikuko Tokugawa was born. She married Prince Takamatsu, the brother of Emperor Hirohito, to become Princess Takamatsu.

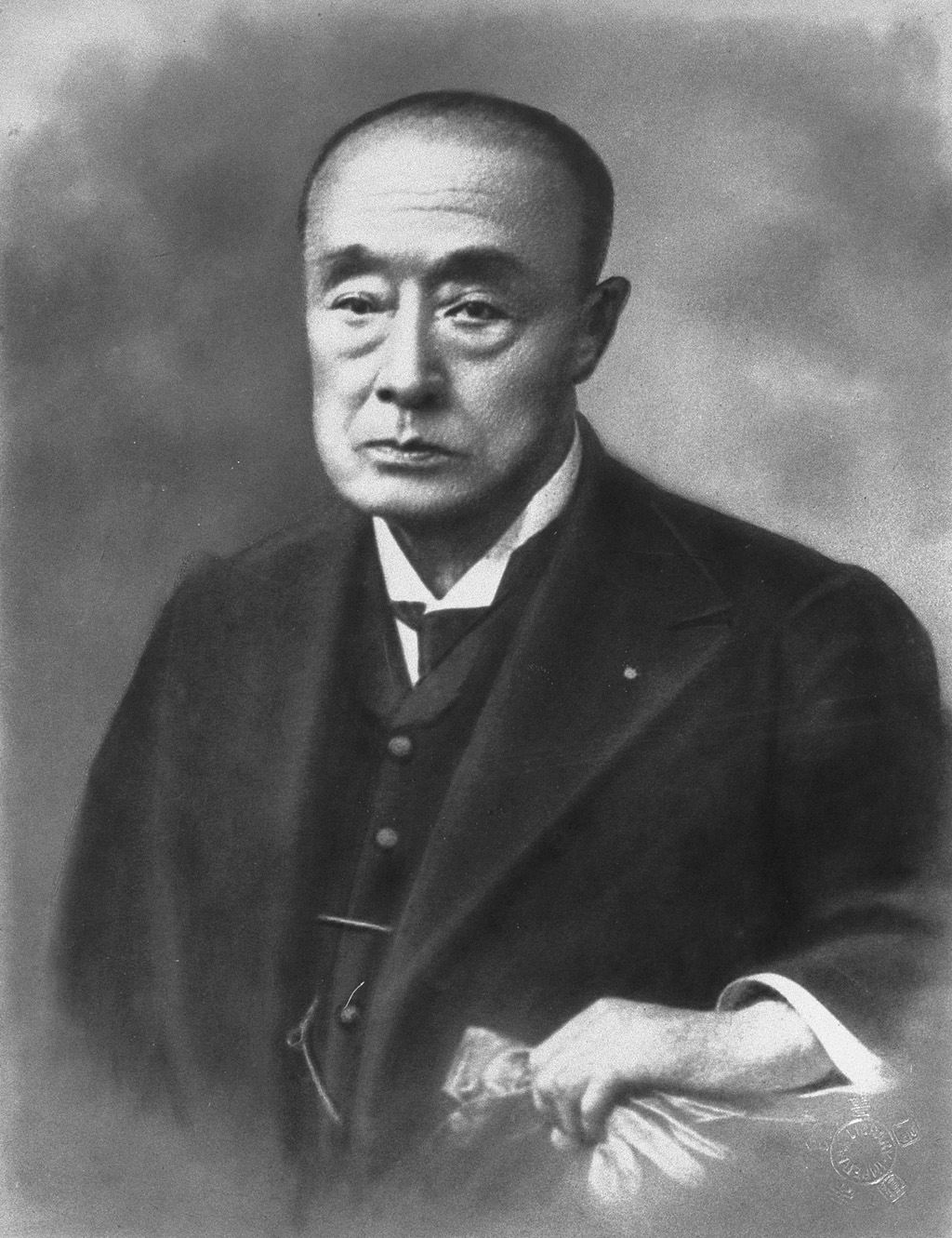
Portrait of Tokugawa Yoshinobu in his later years

== Honors ==
- Prince (3 June 1902)
- Grand Cordon of the Order of the Rising Sun (30 April 1908)
- Grand Cordon of the Order of the Rising Sun with Paulownia Flowers (22 November 1913; posthumous)

=== Order of precedence ===
- Third rank (first day, 12th month of the fourth year of Koka (1847))
- Second rank (10th day, 12th month of the first year of Keio (1865))
- Senior second rank (fifth day, 12th month of the second year of Keio (1866); degraded 28th day, ninth month of the second year of Meiji (1869))
- Fourth rank (appointed 6 January 1872, following degradation in 1869)
- Senior second rank (18 May 1880, restored)
- Junior first rank (20 June 1888)

== Eras of Yoshinobu's bakufu ==
The years in which Yoshinobu was shōgun are more specifically identified by more than one era name or nengō.

- Keiō (1865–1868)
- Meiji (1868–1912)

== Family ==
- Father: Tokugawa Nariaki
- Mother: Arisugawa Yoshiko (1804–1893)
- Wife: Ichijō Mikako (1835–1894)
- Concubines:
  - Shinmura Nobu (1852–1905)
  - Nakane Sachi (1851–1915)
- Children:
  - Kyokoin Tonoike Mizukage Gendaidōjō (1858–1858) by Mikako
  - Akiko (1862–1862) by Mikako
  - Sumiko (1863–1927) by Mikako
  - unknown daughter by Mikako
  - Genji (1871–1872) by Nobu
  - Kaito (1871–1872) by Sachi
  - Takuma (1873–1873) by Sachi
  - Tokugawa Kyoko (1873–1893) married Tokugawa Satotaka (1856–1941) by Nobu
  - Tokugawa Atsushi (1874–1930) by Sachi
  - Kaneko (1875–1875) by Sachi
  - Tokugawa Tetsuko (1875–1921) married Tokugawa Satomichi by Nobu
  - Hachisuka Fudeko (1876–1907) married Hachisuka Masaaki by Sachi
  - Ikeda Nakahiro (1877–1948) inherited Tottori Domain by Nobu
  - Hitoshi (1878–1878) by Nobu
  - Yoshiko (1878–1878) by Sachi
  - Ryōko (1880–1880) by Nobu
  - Namiko (1880–1954) by Sachi, married Matsudaira Hitoshi, son of Matsudaira Naritami
  - Kuniko (1882–1942) by Sachi, married Okouchi Kiko
  - Tokugawa Tsuneko (1882–1939) by Nobu, married Prince Fushimi Hiroyasu
  - Itoko (1883–1953) by Sachi, married Shijo Ryuai
  - stillborn boy (1884–1884) by Sachi
  - Tokugawa Yoshihisa (1884–1922) by Nobu
  - Yasushi (1885–1886) by Sachi
  - Tokugawa Eiko (1887–1924) married Tokugawa Satotaka
  - Tokugawa Makoto (1887–1968) by Sachi
  - Katsu Kuwashi (1888–1932) by Nobu
  - Yoshiko (1891–1891) by Sachi
- Adopted children:
  - Tokugawa Iesato (1863–1940) adopted son, who became 16th head of the Tokugawa Clan, after the end of the Shogunate dynasty.

His grandson Tokugawa Hiromi graduated as part of the 65th Class of the Imperial Japanese Naval Academy in March 1938. On 12 July 1943, he was killed in action during World War II when the submarine Ro-101 he was deployed on was fired on by the destroyer USS Taylor in Indispensable Strait near Guadalcanal in the Solomon Islands. Shrapnel cut down Tokugawa and two enlisted lookouts, but the submarine was able to dive and escape. Tokugawa was posthumously promoted to the rank of Lieutenant Commander.

== See also ==
- Bakumatsu
- Meiji Restoration
- Tokugawa Yoshinobu-ke

== Notes ==
Military offices
Preceded by Tokugawa Iemochi	Sei-i Taishōgun; August 29, 1866 – January 3, 1868	Shogunate abolished
Preceded by Tokugawa Iemochi	— TITULAR — Sei-i Taishōgun; January 3, 1868 – June 19, 1868; Reason for succession failure: Shogunate abolished	Succeeded by Tokugawa Iesato
