= Tokugawa Yoshiyori =

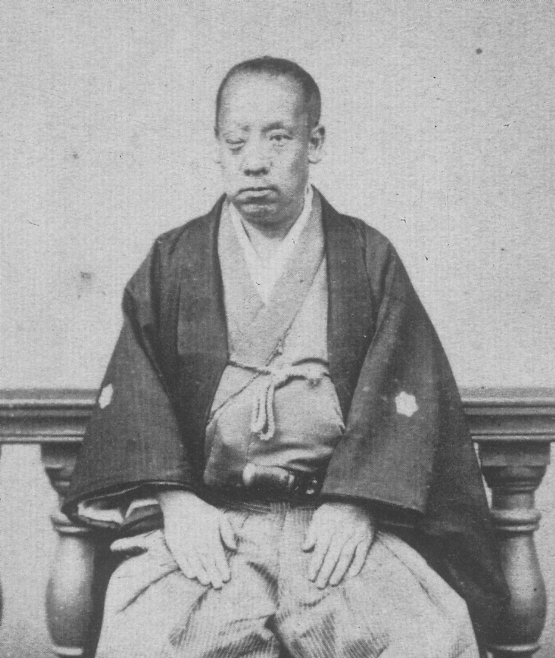
Tokugawa Yoshiyori

Tokugawa Yoshiyori (徳川 慶頼; November 19, 1828 – September 21, 1876) was a Japanese samurai of the late Edo period. Son of the 3rd generation Tayasu family head, Narimasa, he was head of the Tayasu house twice: in 1839–1863 and 1868–1876. He went to Shizuoka Domain in 1868, and served as the guardian of his son the young daimyō Tokugawa Iesato. He was also the father of Tokugawa Takachiyo and Tokugawa Satotaka. His childhood name was Konnosuke (耕之助).

== Family ==
- Father: Tokugawa Narimasa
- Mother: Shinozaki-dono (1794-1858)
- Wives:
  - Teruhime (1826–1840) daughter of 12th shōgun Tokugawa Ieyoshi
  - Kan’in no Miya Yoshiko (1829-1906)
- Concubines:
  - Takai-dono
  - Sawai-dono
- Children:
  - Kikuhime (1856-1865) by Takai
  - Tokugawa Takachiyo by Takai
  - son later Shiun’in (1862-1862) by Takai
  - Tokugawa Iesato by Takai
  - Tokugawa Satotaka by Takai
  - Haruhime (1868-1868) by Takai
  - Okimaru (1871-1871) by Takai
  - Ryumaro (1862-1862) by Sawai
  - Shizuhime (1866-1912) married Sakai Tadazumi by Sawai
  - Kagahime (1867-1868) by Sawai
  - Tokugawa Yorimichi (1872-1925) of Kii-Tokugawa Family by Sawai

== Ancestry ==
Ancestors of Tokugawa Yoshiyori

16. Tokugawa Yoshimune, 8th Tokugawa Shōgun (1684-1751)
8.Tokugawa Munetada, 1st Hitotsubashi-Tokugawa family head (1721-1765)
17. Shinshin'in (1700-1721)
4. Tokugawa Harusada, 2nd Hitotsubashi-Tokugawa family head (1751-1827)
9.Hosoda (Oyuka no Kata)
2. Tokugawa Narimasa, 3rd Tayasu-Tokugawa family head (1779-1848)
5. Maruyama
1. Tokugawa Yoshiyori, 5th Tayasu-Tokugawa family head
3. Shinozaki (1794-1854)

Preceded by Tokugawa Naritaka	Tayasu-Tokugawa family head 1839–1863	Succeeded by Tokugawa Takachiyo
Preceded by Tokugawa Kamenosuke	Tayasu-Tokugawa family head 1868–1876	Succeeded by Tokugawa Satotaka
