= Tokugawa Iesato =

Japanese politician (1863–1940)

Junior First Rank Prince Tokugawa Iesato
- 徳川 家達
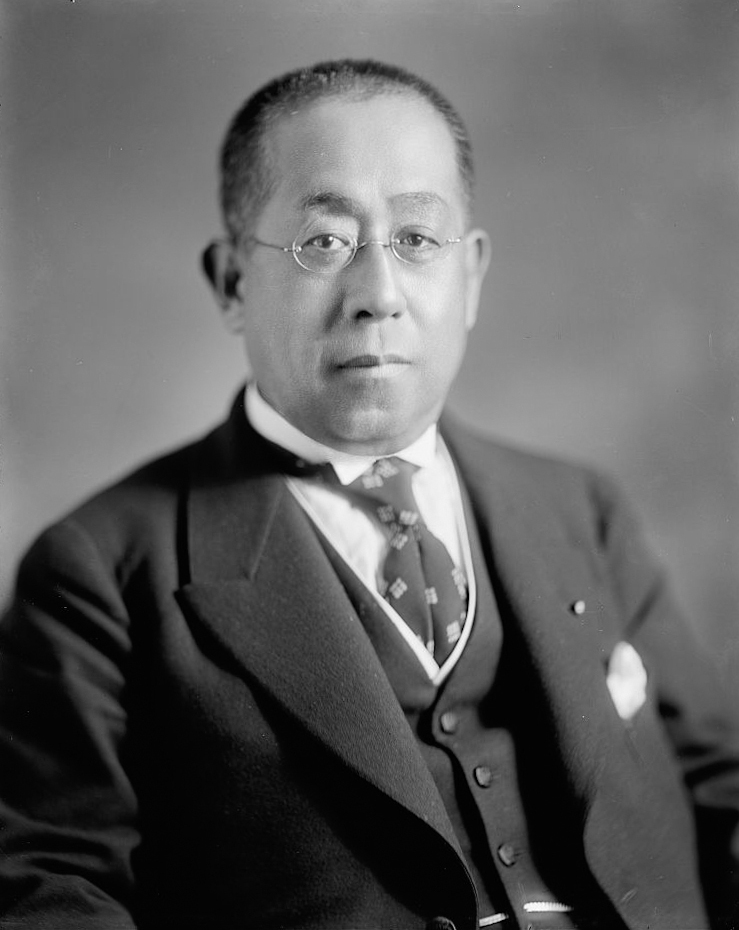

President of the House of Peers
- In office 4 December 1903 – 9 June 1933
- Monarchs: Meiji; Taishō; Shōwa
- Vice President: Nagashige Kuroda; Masaaki Hachisuka; Fumimaro Konoe
- Preceded by: Prince Konoe Atsumaro
- Succeeded by: Prince Fumimaro Konoe

Member of the House of Peers
- In office February 1890 – 5 June 1940 Hereditary peerage

Head of the Tokugawa clan
- In office June 1868 – 5 June 1940
- Preceded by: Tokugawa Yoshinobu
- Succeeded by: Iemasa Tokugawa

Personal details
- Born: Tokugawa Kamenosuke; 24 August 1863 Edo, Musashi, Japan
- Died: 5 June 1940 (aged 76) Sendagaya, Tokyo, Japan
- Spouse: Konoe Hiroko (m. 1882)
- Children: Iemasa Tokugawa; Ayako Matsudaira; Yasuko Takatsukasa; Shigeko Matsudaira
- Education: Eton College; University of Southern California

Prince Tokugawa Iesato (徳川 家達; 24 August 1863 – 5 June 1940) was a Japanese aristocrat and politician who was the first head of the Tokugawa clan after the overthrow of the Tokugawa shogunate in 1868. He was President of the House of Peers from 1903 to 1933. When he travelled to other nations representing Japan during his diplomatic journeys, he usually presented his name as Prince Iyesato Tokugawa. As President of the House of Peers, Tokugawa promoted democratic principles and international goodwill. It was only after his death in 1940 that Japanese militants were able to push Japan into joining the Axis Powers in World War II.

== Early life ==
Tokugawa Iesato was born to the Tayasu branch of the Tokugawa clan, under the name Kamenosuke. He became its 16th head on 19 June 1868, following the resignation of the last shōgun, Tokugawa Yoshinobu. His brothers were Tokugawa Satotaka and Tokugawa Takachiyo, who also held the Tayasu headship at different times. Iesato was also briefly the daimyō of the short-lived Shizuoka Domain, before the abolition of the han system in the early 1870s. His guardian at the time was Matsudaira Naritami, the former lord of the Tsuyama Domain. He was an adopted son of the fourteenth shogun, Tokugawa Iemochi, and his wife, Kazu-no-Miya Chikako or Seikan'in no Miya. (Although Iesato was Iemochi's adopted son, they only met once. Later, Iemochi's foster mother, Tenshō-in, raised Iesato.) In 1866, he was sent to Edo Castle as Iemochi's son and was raised by Tenshō-in and Kazu-no-Miya Chikako. In 1868, he was sent to Kyoto by his mother, Kazu-no-Miya Chikako and met with Emperor Meiji. He married the daughter of Konoe Tadafusa, Konoe Hiroko, who bore him Iemasa Tokugawa, the seventeenth Tokugawa family head, Yasuko Tokugawa, who married Nobusuke Takatsukasa and bore him Toshimichi Takatsukasa, Ryōko Tokugawa, and Toshiko Tokugawa.

== Career ==
In 1877, Iesato was sent to Eton College in Great Britain to study. He aspired to be matriculated at either the University of Cambridge or Oxford, but on Tenshō-in's request, he decided to give up his studies in England and went back to Japan in 1882. In 1884, when the nobility system was reformed to align more with the British system, he was given the title of kōshaku (公爵, prince or duke) in the newly created kazoku peerage system. He became a member of the House of Peers of the Diet of Japan from its creation in 1890, and served as President of the House of Peers from 1903 to 1933. When the administration of Prime Minister Yamamoto Gonnohyōe was brought down by the Siemens scandal, there was a strong movement to have Tokugawa Iesato nominated to be his successor as the new Prime Minister.

Japan not only militarily supported its western allies in their war efforts, it also aided the Allies’ sick and wounded during and after the war. In 1917, out of empathy for the suffering resulting from the enormous death and destruction in Europe during World War I, Prince Iyesato Tokugawa and his close friend and ally Baron Shibusawa Eiichi, along with their other Japanese associates, published a condolence booklet honoring their western allies. This 1917 condolence booklet described the Japanese creating an association to collect a monetary fund which was given to Allied nations to help with their war-related health costs. This association was headed by Prince Iyesato Tokugawa as its president, and Baron Eiichi Shibusawa and S. Shimada as its vice-presidents. Many of Japan's top leaders contributed articles to this booklet expressing their support of the Allies. This condolence booklet was published in a French and English edition. The condolence booklet was titled Japan to her Allies: A Message of Practical Sympathy from the Japan Association for Aiding the Sick and Wounded Soldiers and Others Suffering from the War in the Allied Countries, Published in Tokyo, Japan, 1917. The illustrated biography The Art of Peace by Stan S. Katz highlights the alliance between Prince Iyesato Tokugawa and Baron Eiichi Shibusawa as they promoted democracy and international goodwill.

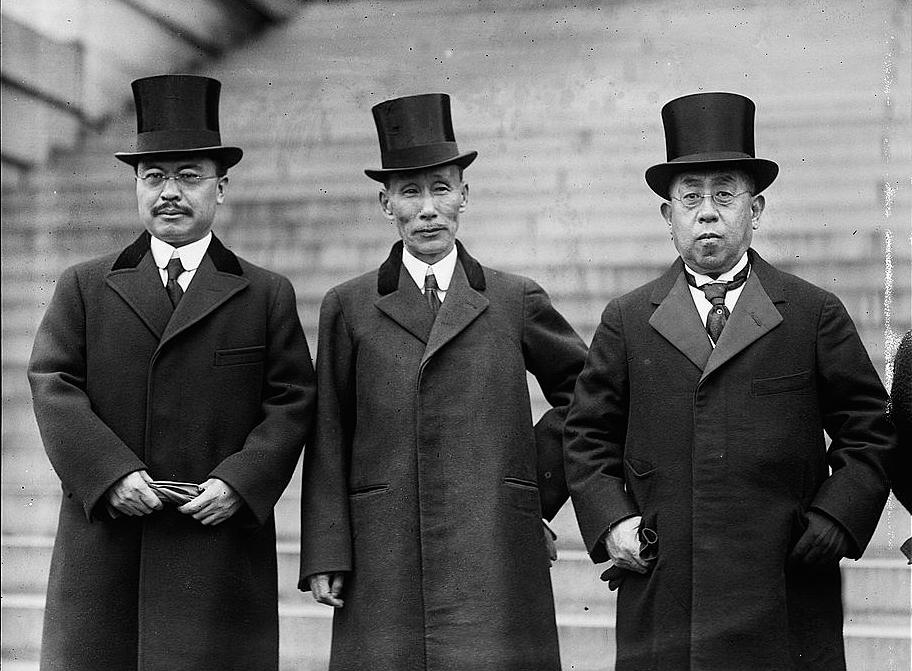
From left to right, Kijūrō Shidehara, Katō Tomosaburō, and Iesato on 3 November 1921, to attend the Washington Naval Conference.

Following World War I, Iesato headed the Japanese delegation to the Washington Naval Conference. His support of the United States position on the 10:10:6 division of naval strength between the United States, Great Britain and Japan drew considerable wrath from the ultra-rightist movements and conservative factions within the Imperial Japanese Navy.

Iesato recovered the political fortunes and reputation of the Tokugawa family, holding many senior government positions before his retirement, including in 1928, being appointed as the 7th President of the Japanese Red Cross Society, head of the Japan-America Society, and President of the national organizing committee for the 1940 Olympics. Iesato is quoted as once having said about his adoptive father: "Yoshinobu destroyed the Tokugawa house; I rebuilt it."

In 1930, Rotary International wished to recognize and honor Prince Iyesato Tokugawa's lifelong devotion to maintaining international goodwill by selecting him to be the Keynote speaker at their Silver (25th) Anniversary Convention celebration. There are photos available from 1930 that present the founder of Rotary International, Paul Harris, along with the current President of Rotary (1929-1930) M. Eugene Newsom, introducing their Keynote speaker Prince Tokugawa to the 15,000 Rotarians attending the event from around the world.

One of Prince Tokugawa's close allies during the 1930s in the promotion of goodwill between Japan and the United States was Ambassador Joseph Grew. In 1932, Prince Tokugawa honored Grew with a reception when he first became U.S. Ambassador to Japan.

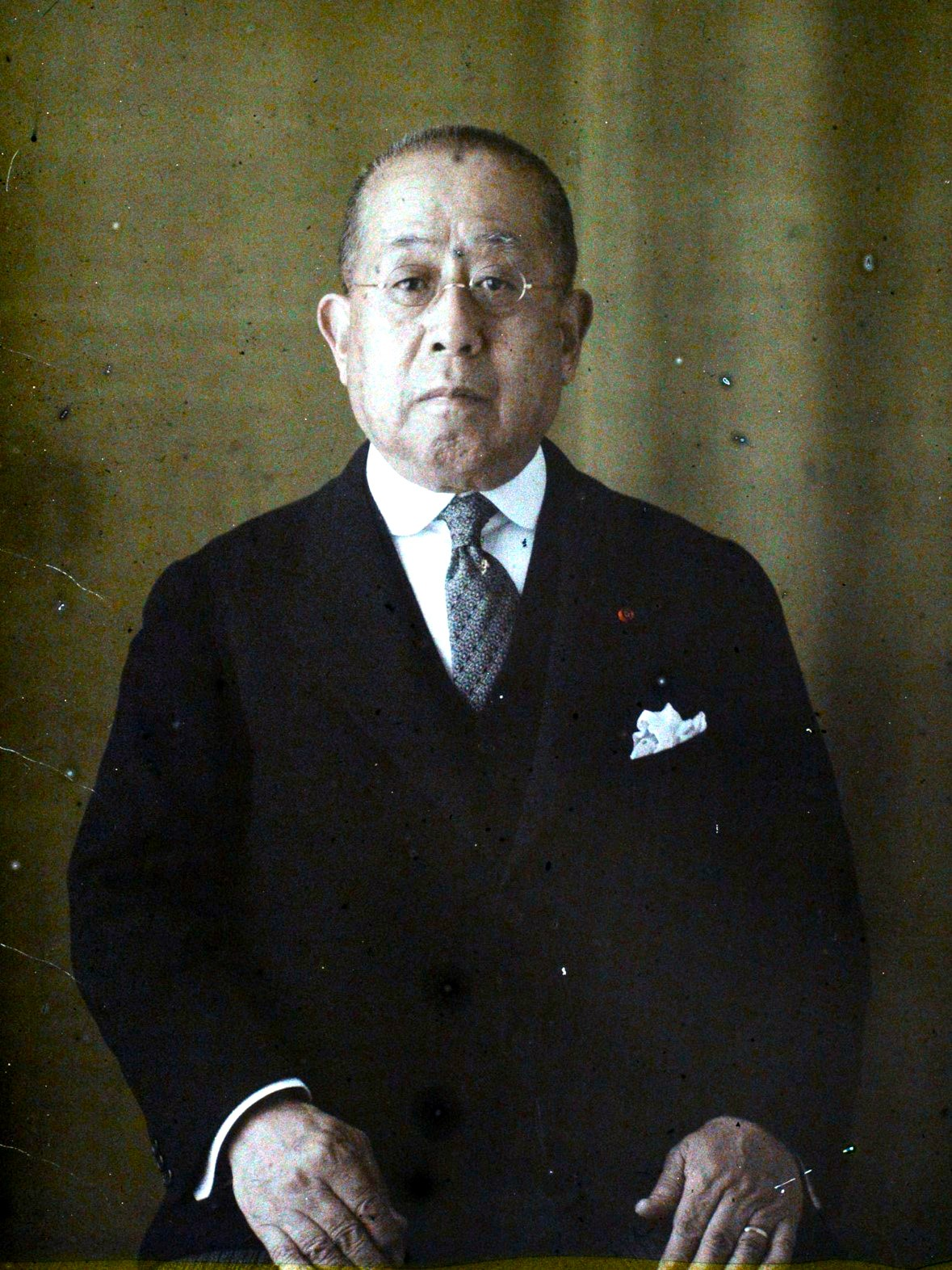
Autochrome portrait by Georges Chevalier, 1930

From late 1933 and into 1934, Prince Iyesato Tokugawa went on a world tour. He first arrived in the U.S. in San Francisco, California. He had only recently retired from his distinguished thirty-year career as President of Japan's upper house of congress, the House of Peers. He arrived aboard the Chichibu Maru ocean liner en route to England. During his travels, he stated he wished to renew old friendships. Prince Tokugawa first visited America in 1882, after completing his studies in England. The Prince mentioned he looked forward to visiting the World's Fair being held in Chicago. Besides being a pleasant vacation, Prince Tokugawa's world travels were very much directed at attempting to further strengthen Japan's relationship with its allies in the U.S. and Europe so as to better resist a rising global militarism and fascism. While in the U.S., Prince Tokugawa delivered a radio address to the American public describing the long enduring and friendly relations between United States and Japan; he also met with President Franklin Delano Roosevelt, as well as other U.S. congressional leaders, encouraging a united front to prevent a potential upcoming war.

During his visit in 1934, Prince Iyesato Tokugawa received an honorary Doctor of Laws degree from the University of Southern California. The president of the university, Dr. Rufus B. von KleinSmid, handed the degree to Prince Tokugawa. This presentation took place during a special luncheon given 19 March 1934 in Los Angeles, hosted by George I. Cochran, the president of the school's board of trustees. The Los Angeles Times stated that this honorary degree was given to Prince Tokugawa "in recognition of distinguished service in international statesmanship", and for his "support of many philanthropic and educational movements." In accepting the honor, Prince Tokugawa respectfully said, "He wished to receive it in the name of the Japanese people as a whole rather than as a personal distinction." Prince Iyesato Tokugawa was accompanied by his son Iyemasa, who was the newly appointed Minister to Canada, and by his granddaughter Miss Toyo Tokugawa. The Japan-America Society of Los Angeles (part of the National Association of Japan-America Societies) was to host a banquet dinner that evening to honor Prince Tokugawa's visit; California Governor James Rolph and former Mayor of Los Angeles John C. Porter planned to attend.

Iesato died on 5 June 1940, in Tokyo, aged 76. His grave is at the Tokugawa family cemetery at the temple of Kan'ei-ji in Ueno, Tokyo. He was succeeded by his son Tokugawa Iemasa.

== Family ==
- Father: Tokugawa Yoshiyori
- Mother: Takai Takeko
- Adoptive Father: Tokugawa Iemochi
- Adoptive Mother: Kazu-no-Miya Chikako
- Wife: Konoe Hiroko (1867–1944)
- Children:
  - Tokugawa Iemasa
  - Tokugawa Yasuko married Nobusuke Takatsukasa
  - Tokugawa Ryoko married Matsudaira Yasumasa
  - Tokugawa Toshiko married Matsudaira Naokuni

Preceded by Tokugawa Yoshinobu	Tokugawa family head June 19, 1868 – June 5, 1940	Succeeded by Tokugawa Iemasa
Preceded by Tokugawa Takachiyo	Tayasu-Tokugawa family head 1865 – 1868	Succeeded by Tokugawa Yoshiyori
Political offices
Preceded by Konoe Atsumaro	President of the House of Peers; 1903–1933	Succeeded by Konoe Fumimaro
