= Tokugawa Satonari =

Motoko Tokugawa and Satonari Tokugawa

Satonari Tokugawa (徳川 達成, Tokugawa Satonari; May 3, 1899 – March 28, 1961) was a Japanese naval officer. He was the 10th head of the Tayasu branch of the Tokugawa clan. Born in Tokyo, Satonari was the eldest son of Count Tokugawa Satotaka. He went on to graduate from Tokyo Imperial University's engineering college.

He held the rank of captain in the Imperial Japanese Navy prior to World War II, and subsequently worked for K. Hattori.

== Family ==
- Father: Tokugawa Satotaka
- Mother: Shimazu Tomoko
- Wife: Todo Motoko
- Children:
  - Munefusa Tokugawa by Motoko
  - Masako married Tokugawa Yoshiyasu of Owari-Tokugawa Family by Motoko
  - Tokugawa Munemasa (1930-1999) by Motoko
  - Tokugawa Munehiro by Motoko
  - Sumiko married Hitoguchi Michiobu by Motoko
  - Matsudaira Munetoshi (b.1940) by Motoko

Preceded by Tokugawa Satotaka	Tayasu-Tokugawa family head 1941–1961	Succeeded by Munefusa Tokugawa
