= Tokugawa Satotaka =

Japanese courtier

Count Tokugawa Satotaka
- 徳川 達孝
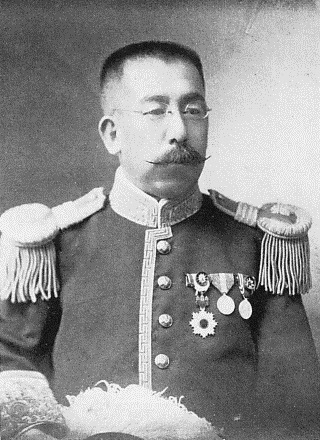
- Tokugawa in 1913

Grand Chamberlain to the Emperor
- In office 22 March 1922 – 3 March 1927
- Monarchs: Taishō; Hirohito
- Preceded by: Ogimachi Sanemasa
- Succeeded by: Chinda Sutemi

Member of the House of Peers
- In office 8 July 1897 – 6 June 1914 Elected by the Counts

Personal details
- Born: 25 May 1865 Edo, Musashi, Japan
- Died: 18 February 1941 (aged 75) Sendagaya, Tokyo, Japan
- Children: Tokugawa Satonari
- Parent: Tokugawa Yoshiyori (father)
- Relatives: Tayasu-Tokugawa family

Count Tokugawa Satotaka (徳川 達孝; 25 May 1865 – 18 February 1941) was a Japanese aristocrat and politician who was Grand Chamberlain of Japan from 1922 to 1927.

== Biography ==
He was born on 25 May 1865, the fourth son of Tokugawa (Tayasu) Yoshiyori and the younger brother of Tokugawa Iesato. His childhood name was Gunnosuke (群之助).

In 1897, he became a member of the House of Peers. He also served on the Board of Trustees of Gakushūin. He served as Grand Chamberlain from 1922 to 1927, and went on to become chairman of the Japan Kōdōkai.

He died on 18 February 1941.

== Family ==
- Father: Tokugawa Yoshiyori
- Mother: Takai Takeko
- Wives:
  - Kyoko, Daughter of 15th shōgun Yoshinobu
  - Shimazu Tomoko, Daughter of Shimazu Tadayoshi (2nd)
- Children:
  - Sumiko married Naoyoshi Mizoguchi by Kyoko
  - Tokiko married Tsuchiya Kennao by Kyoko
  - Tsuyako married Tachibana Kantoku by Kyoko
  - Shuko married Tokugawa Takesada of Matsudo-Tokugawa Family by Kyoko
  - Satonari Tokugawa by Tomoko
  - Keiko married Okubo Kan’ichi by Tomoko

Preceded by Ogimachi Sanemasa	Grand Chamberlain to the Emperor; 1922–1927	Succeeded by Chinda Sutemi
Preceded by Tokugawa Yoshiyori	Tayasu-Tokugawa family head 1876–1941	Succeeded by Satonari Tokugawa
