= Nobusuke Takatsukasa =

Japanese nobleman and politician

- 鷹司 信輔
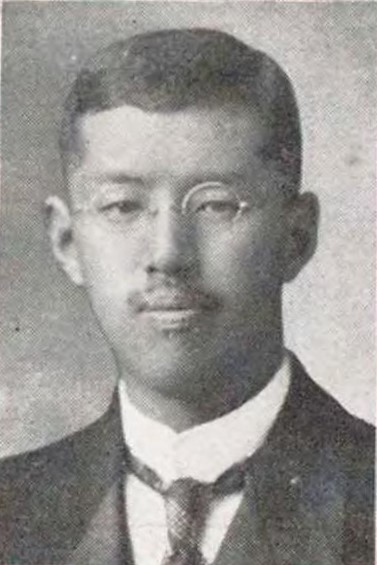
- Takatsukasa in a 1940 publication

Member of the House of Peers
- In office 10 June 1918 – 2 May 1947 Hereditary peerage

Personal details
- Born: 29 April 1889 Chiyoda, Tokyo, Japan
- Died: 1 February 1959 (aged 69) Yoyogi, Tokyo, Japan
- Children: Toshimichi Takatsukasa
- Parent: Takatsukasa Hiromichi (father)
- Relatives: Takatsukasa family
- Education: Tokyo Imperial University

Prince Nobusuke Takatsukasa (鷹司 信輔, Takatsukasa Nobusuke; 29 April 1889 – 1 February 1959), son of Hiromichi, was a Japanese nobleman and politician of the Meiji era (1868–1912) who served as a member of House of Peers in the Diet of Japan. Takatsukasa Nobuhiro was his brother, and Toshimichi was his son. He was a keen ornithologist who went by the nickname of “Bird Prince” (Kotori no koshaku).

== Education and career ==
Takatsukasa graduated in zoology from the Imperial University of Tokyo (1914) where he studied under Isao Ijima and received a doctorate in 1943. He was a specialist on birds and published several papers and books on the birds of Japan, collaborating with other Japanese ornithologists including Yoshimaro Yamashina and Masauji Hachisuka. He also worked with Oliver L. Austin Jr. (1903-1988). He was also a keen aviculturist. He presided over the Ornithological Society of Japan from 1922 to 1946. His books included Kaidori (1917), Kaidori Shusei (1930) and Japanese Birds (1941). In 1944, he became high priest for the Meiji Shrine and was involved in the "Great Zoo Massacre" of 1943 at the Ueno zoological gardens. He presided over the "Memorial Service for Martyred Animals" following the killing of the animals.

== Personal life ==
He married Yasuko Tokugawa (1897–1976), a descendant of Tokugawa Yoshinao. Their son Toshimichi married Kazuko Takatsukasa, daughter of Emperor Hirohito.
