= Tokugawa clan =

Japanese samurai family and noble family which ruled as a shogunate from 1603 to 1867

Tokugawa 徳川
- Tokugawa clan mon
- Home province: Mikawa
- Parent house: Minamoto clan; Nitta clan (Via a female member via marriage); Matsudaira clan
- Titles: Various
- Founder: Tokugawa Ieyasu
- Final ruler: Tokugawa Yoshinobu
- Current head: Iehiro Tokugawa
- Founding year: 1567
- Ruled until: 1868 (abolition of the shogunate); 1871 (abolition of the han system)
- Cadet branches: Various, including: Gosanke: Owari-Tokugawa family; Kishū-Tokugawa family, with 3 cadet branches Gosankyō: Tayasu family; Hitotsubashi family; Shimizu family; Mito-Tokugawa family; Matsudo-Tokugawa family; Tokugawa Yoshinobu family

The Tokugawa clan (徳川氏, Tokugawa-shi, Tokugawa-uji; Japanese pronunciation: [to.kɯꜜ.ɡa.wa, -ŋa.wa, -kɯ.ɡa.waꜜ.ɕi, -ŋa.waꜜ-]) is a Japanese samurai clan and dynasty which produced the Tokugawa shoguns who ruled Japan from 1603 to 1868 during the Edo period. It was formerly a powerful daimyō family. They nominally descended from Emperor Seiwa (850–880) and were a branch of the Minamoto clan (Seiwa Genji) through the Matsudaira clan. The early history of the clan remains a mystery. Nominally, the Matsudaira clan is said to be descended from the Nitta clan, a branch of the Minamoto clan, but this is considered to be untrue or unlikely.

== History ==
Minamoto no Yoshishige (1135–1202), grandson of Minamoto no Yoshiie (1041–1108), was the first to take the name of Nitta. He sided with his cousin Minamoto no Yoritomo against the Taira clan (1180) and accompanied him to Kamakura. Nitta Yoshisue, 4th son of Yoshishige, settled at Tokugawa (Kozuke province) and took the name of that place. Their provincial history book did not mention Minamoto clan or Nitta clan.

The nominal originator of the Matsudaira clan was reportedly Matsudaira Chikauji, who was originally a poor Buddhist monk. He reportedly descended from Nitta Yoshisue in the 8th generation and witnessed the ruin of the Nitta in their war against the Ashikaga. He settled at Matsudaira (Mikawa province) and was adopted by his wife's family. Their provincial history book claimed that this original clan was Ariwara clan. Because this place is said to have been reclaimed by Ariwara Nobumori, one theory holds that Matsudaira clan was related to Ariwara no Narihira.

The lineage as recorded in Tokugawa sources, including the Tokugawa Jikki (徳川実紀) and Kansei Chōshū Shokafu (寛政重修諸家譜), was presented as follows:

Emperor Seiwa

→ Minamoto no Tsunemoto

→ Minamoto no Mitsunaka

→ Minamoto no Yorinobu

→ Minamoto no Yoriyoshi

→ Minamoto no Yoshiie

→ Minamoto no Yoshikuni

→ Nitta Yoshishige

→ (Tokugawa/Nitta branch of Kōzuke Province) (Claimed)
→ Nitta Yoshiki (4th son, lived in Nitta-sho Tokugawa and called himself Tokugawa)

→ Nitta Yoriji (2nd son, named Yashiro Sarada and became the governor of Mikawa)

→ Jiro Noriji

→ Matajiro Ietoki

→ Yajiro Mitsuyoshi

→ Masayoshi

→ Chikaki

→ Arichika

→ Arichka's son was supposedly Chikauji, which would make him the same as Nobumitsu. Some sources say Arichka was the biological father and Nobumitsu the adoptive father of Chikauji.
→ Matsudaira Nobumitsu (c. 1404- c. 1488)

→ Matsudaira Chikauji (jp) (c. 1431-1501)

→ Matsudaira Nagachika (1473-1519)

→ Matsudaira Nobutada (jp) (1490-1531)

→ Matsudaira Kiyoyasu (1511–1535)

→ Matsudaira Hirotada (1526– 1549)

→ Tokugawa Ieyasu

The authenticity of the Tokugawa claim to Minamoto descent remains debated among historians. Genealogical records from the Kamakura and Muromachi periods do not clearly document a continuous line from the Nitta to the Matsudaira, leading some scholars to regard the claim as a politically motivated reconstruction during Ieyasu’s rise to power.

Nonetheless, the assertion proved effective in providing Ieyasu with the symbolic authority to assume the title of Seii Taishōgun, a rank historically limited to descendants of the Seiwa Genji line. In 1603, the Imperial Court officially recognized his Minamoto lineage, allowing him to be styled Minamoto no Ieyasu (源家康).

Matsudaira Nobumitsu (15th century), son of Chikauji, was in charge of Okazaki Castle, and strengthened the authority of his family in the Mikawa province. Nobumitsu's great-great-grandson Matsudaira Kiyoyasu made his clan strong, but was assassinated. In 1567, Matsudaira Motonobu—then known as Tokugawa Ieyasu (1542–1616)—grandson of Kiyoyasu, was recognized by Emperor Ōgimachi as a descendant of Seiwa Genji; he also started the family name Tokugawa. According to historical documents from the same period, some of the three generations of the Matsudaira clan, including Nobumitsu, took the surname Kamo no Ason (Kamo), and the Matsudaira clan's hollyhock crest also suggests a connection to the Kamo clan, so some have pointed out that they were actually vassals of the Kamo clan. Tokugawa Ieyasu himself signed the letter of assurance to the Suganuma clan in 1561, shortly after independence from the Imagawa clan, as "Minamoto no Motoyasu" ("Suganuma Family Genealogy" and "Documents Possessed by Kunozan Toshogu Shrine")

The clan rose to power at the end of the Sengoku period. as their political influences and territories they controlled expanded during this period, they developed many new offices such as many magistrate official such as Kōriki Kiyonaga, Amano Yasukage, Honda Shigetsugu, and many others, to control their new territories and vassals. In 1566, as Ieyasu declared his independence from the Imagawa clan, he reformed the order of Mikawa province starting with the Matsudaira clan, after he pacified Mikawa. This decision was made after he counseled by his senior vassal Sakai Tadatsugu to abandon their allegiance with the Imagawa clan. He also strengthened his powerbase by creating a military government system of Tokugawa clan in Mikawa which based from his hereditary vassals Fudai daimyō. The system which called "Sanbi no gunsei" (三備の軍制) with the structure divide the governance into three sections:

1. Hatamoto-Senshi: Ieyasu's direct vassals unit of army. Their task was to personally protect Ieyasu, the earliest commanders of this unit such as Matsudaira Ietada (Tojo), Torii Mototada, Honda Tadakatsu, Sakakibara Yasumasa, Ōkubo Tadayo, Osuga Yasutaka, Uomura Iezumi, and others
2. Higashi Mikawa: unit of Western Mikawa province army, put under the control of Sakai Tadatsugu as overall commander, the commanders of this unit consisted of many Matsudaira clansmen and other hereditary vassals of Tokugawa such as Matsudaira Ietada (Fukōzu), Matsudaira Tadamasa, Matsudaira Ietada (Katahara), and others
3. Nishi-Mikawa: unit of Eastern Mikawa province army, put under the control of Ishikawa Ienari (De jure, De facto was his nephew, Ishikawa Kazumasa) as overall commander, the commanders of this unit consisted of many Matsudaira clansmen and other hereditary vassals which assigned on eastern side of the province, such as Shimada Heizo, Hiraiwa Chikayoshi, Naitō Ienaga, Sakai Tadatoshi, Matsudaira Shinichi, and others.

To the end of the Edo period they ruled Japan as shoguns. During the Edo period There were fifteen Tokugawa shoguns. Their dominance was so strong that some history books use the term "Tokugawa era" instead of "Edo period". Their principal family shrine is the Tōshō-gū in Nikkō, and their principal temples (bodaiji) are Kan'ei-ji and Zōjō-ji, both in Tokyo. Heirlooms of the clan are partly administered by the Tokugawa Memorial Foundation.

After the death of Ieyasu, in 1636, the heads of the gosanke (the three branches with fiefs in Owari, Kishū, and Mito) also bore the Tokugawa surname, so did the three additional branches, known as the gosankyō: the Tayasu (1731), Hitotsubashi (1735), and Shimizu (1758) family, after the ascension of Tokugawa Yoshimune. Once a shogun died without a living heir, both the heads of gosanke (except Mito-Tokugawa family) and gosankyō had priority to succeed his position. Many daimyōs descended from cadet branches of the clan, however, retained the surname Matsudaira; examples include the Matsudaira of Fukui and Aizu. Members of the Tokugawa clan intermarried with prominent daimyo and the Imperial family.

On November 9, 1867, Tokugawa Yoshinobu, the 15th and the last shogun of Tokugawa, tendered his resignation to Emperor Meiji. He formally stepped down ten days later, returning governing power to the Emperor, marking the end of the ruling power of the Tokugawa shogunate. In 1868, Tokugawa Iesato (1863–1940, from Tayasu family) was chosen as the heir to Yoshinobu as the head of Tokugawa clan. On July 7, 1884, Iesato became a prince, just like the heads of some of other notable Japanese noble families, known as Kazoku.

The 1946 Constitution of Japan abolished the kazoku and the noble titles, making Iesato's son, Iemasa Tokugawa, no longer a prince. Iemasa had a son Iehide, who died young, so he was succeeded by one of his grandsons, Tsunenari. Tsunenari is the second son of Toyoko (eldest daughter of Iemasa) and Ichirō Matsudaira (son of Tsuneo Matsudaira), and he is also a patrilineal descendant of Tokugawa Yorifusa, the youngest son of Tokugawa Ieyasu.

In 2007, Tsunenari published a book entitled Edo no idenshi (江戸の遺伝子), released in English in 2009 as The Edo Inheritance, which seeks to counter the common belief among Japanese that the Edo period was like a Dark Age, when Japan, cut off from the world, fell behind. On the contrary, he argues, the roughly 250 years of peace and relative prosperity saw great economic reforms, the growth of a sophisticated urban culture, and the development of the most urbanized society on the planet. Tsunenari formed the Tokugawa Memorial Foundation in 2003 to preserve and administer the historical objects, art, armor and documents that have been passed down in the Tokugawa family over the generations, display them for the general public and provide assistance to academic research on topics concerning historical Japan.

== Symbol ==
The Tokugawa's clan symbol, known in Japanese as a "mon", the "triple hollyhock" (although commonly, but mistakenly identified as "hollyhock", the "aoi" actually belongs to the birthwort family and translates as "wild ginger"—Asarum), has been a readily recognized icon in Japan, symbolizing in equal parts the Tokugawa clan and the last shogunate.

The symbol derives from a mythical clan, the Kamo clan, which legendarily descended from Yatagarasu. Matsudaira village was located in Higashikamo District, Aichi Prefecture. Although Emperor Go-Yōzei offered a new symbol, Ieyasu continued to use the symbol, which was not related to Minamoto clan.

In jidaigeki, the symbol is often shown to locate the story in the Edo period. In works set in during the Meiji Restoration movement, the symbol is used to show the bearer's allegiance to the shogunate—as opposed to the royalists, whose cause is symbolized by the Imperial throne's chrysanthemum symbol.

== Family members ==
- Tokugawa Ieyasu
- Tokugawa Hidetada
- Matsudaira Nobuyasu
- Kamehime
- Yūki Hideyasu
- Matsudaira Ietada
- Matsudaira Tadaaki
- Matsudaira Tadanao
- Tokuhime
- Komatsuhime
- Tokugawa Iemitsu
- Senhime
- Tokugawa Mitsukuni
- Tokugawa Iesada
- Tsunenari Tokugawa
- Muneyoshi Tokugawa
- Yoshitomo Tokugawa
- Iehiro Tokugawa

== Retainers ==
=== Clans ===
- Abe clan of Mikawa Province
- Gosankyō
- Honda clan
- Ii clan
- Ishikawa clan
- Ōkubo clan
- Sakai clan
- Toda clan

=== Important retainers ===
- Abe Masakatsu
- Akaza Naoyasu
- Amano Yasukage
- Ando Naotsugu
- Ando Shigenobu
- Aoyama Tadanari
- Ariyama Toyouji
- Asano Nagaakira
- Baba Nobushige
- Fukushima Masanori
- Fukushima Masayori
- Furuta Shigekatsu
- Hattori Hanzō
- Hattori Masanari
- Hiraiwa Chikayoshi
- Hirose Kagefusa
- Hisamatsu Sadakatsu
- Honda Hirotaka
- Honda Masanobu
- Honda Masazumi
- Honda Narishige
- Honda Shigetsugu
- Honda Tadakatsu
- Honda Tadamasa
- Honda Tadatoki
- Honda Tadatsugu
- Honda Tadazumi
- Honda Yasutoshi (1569–1621)
- Honda Yasutoshi (1693–1747)
- Hoshina Masamitsu
- Hoshina Masanao
- Hoshina Masatoshi
- Ii Naotora
- Ii Naomasa
- Ii Naotaka
- Ii Naotsugu
- Ina Tadatsugu
- Ishikawa Kazumasa
- Ishin Sūden
- Kikkawa Hiroie
- Kobayakawa Hideaki
- Kōriki Kiyonaga
- Kutsuki Mototsuna
- Mizuno Nobumoto
- Naitō Ienaga
- Naitō Nobunari
- Natsume Yoshinobu
- Ogasawara Ujisuke
- Ogawa Suketada
- Ōkubo Tadayo
- Ōkubo Tadasuke
- Ōkubo Tadachika
- Ōkubo Nagayasu
- Okudaira Sadamasa
- Sakai Tadatsugu
- Sakakibara Yasumasa
- Suganuma Sadamitsu
- Torii Tadayoshi
- Torii Mototada
- Uemura Masakatsu
- Wakisaka Yasuharu
- Watanabe Moritsuna

== See also ==
- Matsudaira clan (parent house of Tokugawa clan)
- Nitta clan (parent house of Tokugawa clan)
- Minamoto clan (parent house of Matsudaira and Nitta clans)
- Imperial House of Japan (parent house of Minamoto clan)

== Appendix ==
=== Bibliography ===
- Arthur Lindsay Sadler (2014). The Maker of Modern Japan The Life of Tokugawa Ieyasu. Taylor & Francis. pp. 123–124. ISBN 9781136924705.
- Kasatani, Kazuhiko (1997). "徳川家康の源氏改姓問題". 日本研究 (16). 国際日本文化研究センター: 33–48.
- Tokugawa memorial foundation
