= Daihō Castle =

- 大宝城
- Shimotsuma, Ibaraki Prefecture, Japan
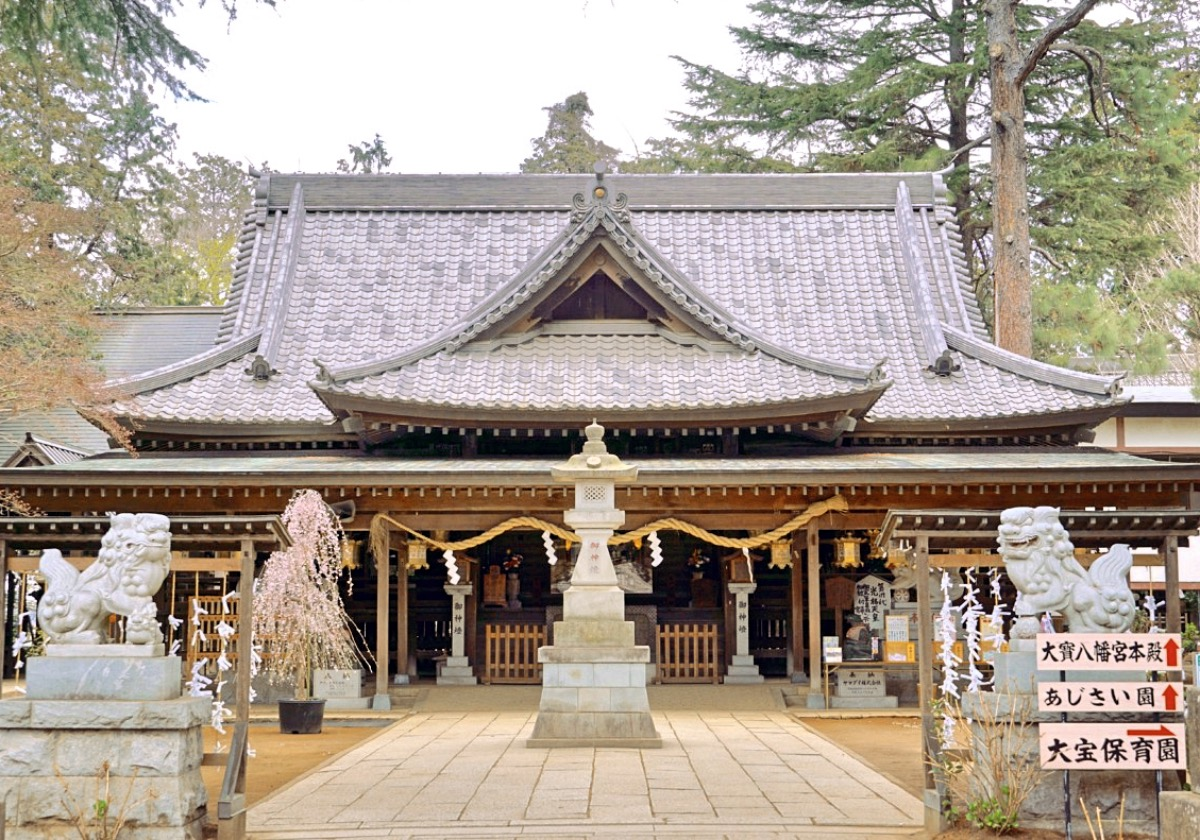
- Daihō Hachiman-gu, built on the site of Daihō Castle

Site information
- Type: hirayama-style Japanese castle
- Open to the public: yes (no public facilities)
- Condition: ruins

Location
- Daihō Castle Daihō Castle (Japan)
- Coordinates: 36°9′2″N 140°6′39.2″E

Site history
- Built: Kamakura period
- Built by: Shimotsuma clan
- In use: Kamakura to Nanboku-chō period
- Demolished: 1232

Daihō Castle (大宝城, Daihō jō) was a hirayama-style Muromachi period Japanese castle located in what is now the city of Shimotsuma, Ibaraki Prefecture, in the northern Kantō region of Japan. Its ruins have been protected as a National Historic Site since 1934.

== Background ==
Daihō Castle is located at the northern end of a cape-shaped plateau surrounded by paddy fields. It was the site of a major battle during the Nanboku-chō period. Since 1981, archaeological excavations have been carried out to confirm the remains of the site, which is currently occupied by the Daihō Hachiman-gu, a Shinto shrine. The castle had dimensions of roughly 288 meters east-to-west by 576 meters north-to-south. There are few remaining physical remains. This castle and its neighbor, Seki Castle are separated by 2.5 kilometers of what was once swamp during the medieval period. The castle site is about 5 minutes on foot from Daihō Station on the Kantō Railway’s Jōsō Line.

== History ==
Shimotsuma Nagamasa built this castle in 1232. It was a "water castle" built on a hill surrounded by a large swamp on three sides, and was connected by boat to neighboring Seki Castle. In the Nanboku-chō period, Shimotsuma Masayasu was a supporter of the Southern Court against Ashikaga Takauji, and therefore came under attack by Northern Court armies led by Kō no Morofuyu. After Southern Court general Kitabatake Chikafusa was defeated at Oda Castle, he sought shelter at Daihō Castle and recognized the Shimotsuma clan as shugo of Hitachi Province before escaping to Yoshino. However, the castle fell to northern forces in 1344 and was destroyed along with the Shimotsuma clan. Today, only some fragments of its earthen ramparts and moats remain.

== See also ==
- List of Historic Sites of Japan (Ibaraki)
