= Kiyotaki-ji (Tsuchiura) =

Buddhist temple in Ibaraki Prefecture, Japan

- 清滝寺
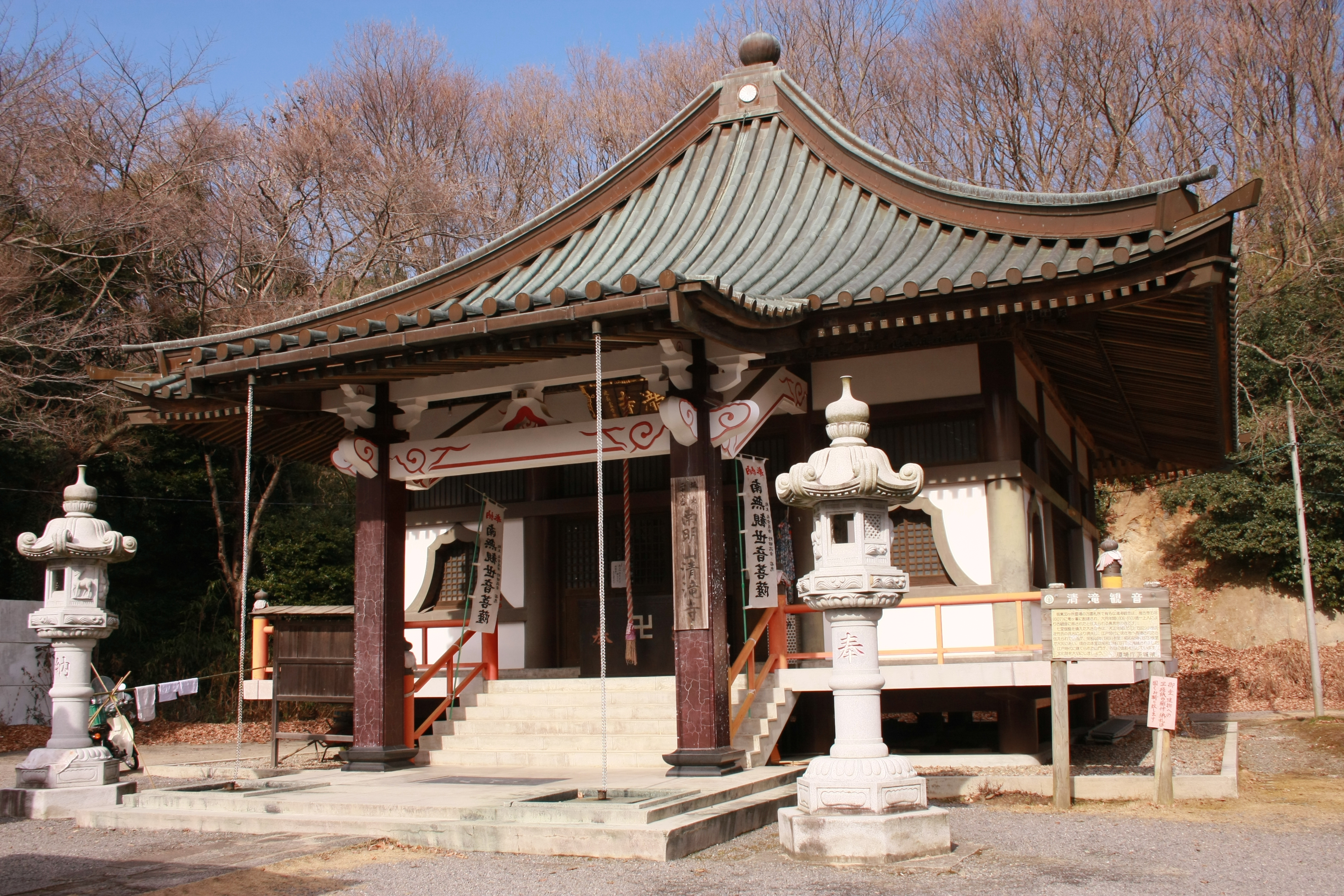
- Kannon-do (Hondo)

- Location within Ibaraki Prefecture Location within Japan

Religion
- Affiliation: Buddhist
- Deity: Kannon Bosatsu
- Rite: Shingon-shu Buzan-ha
- Status: functional

Location
- Location: 1151 Ono, Tsuchiura-shi, Ibaraki-ken
- Country: Japan
- Interactive map of Kiyotaki-ji
- Coordinates: 36°09′54.7″N 140°10′02.5″E

Architecture
- Completed: c.607

Kiyotaki-ji (清滝寺) is a Buddhist temple located in the Ono neighborhood of the city of Tsuchiura, Ibaraki Prefecture, Japan. It belongs to the Buzan-branch of Shingon Buddhism and its honzon is a statue of Kannon Bosatsu, also popularly known as the Kiyotaki Kannon (清滝観音). The temples full name is Nanmyō-zan Jigen-in Seirū-ji (南明山慈眼院清滝寺). The temple is the 26th stop on the Bandō Sanjūsankasho pilgrimage route.

== History ==
The origins of this temple are uncertain. According to the temple's legend, it was founded in 607 (the second year of Emperor Suiko's reign) when a statue of Kannon created by Prince Shōtoku was enshrined on Mount Ryūgamine (the hill behind the temple). An alternative account is written in the Bando Reijoki, stating that when the kami of Mount Tsukuba visited this area, they felt thirsty and pierced the mountain with their staff, causing springs to gush out in the north and south. The monk Gyōki built a chapel at the southern spring, enshrining a statue Kannon which he had carved himself.

During the Daidō era (806-810) the priest Tokuitsu moved it from the mountain to its present location. Again, an alternative account states that it was the cloistered-Emperor Kazan, who revived the Bandō Sanjūsankasho pilgrimage, who relocated the temple, and (according to the legend), came here in person to pray.

Until the end of the Sengoku period, the temple flourished under the protection of the Oda clan, lords of nearby Oda Castle; however, the temple was destroyed due to the wars of the Tenshō era (1573-1592). Furthermore, the Oda were destroyed by Toyotomi Hideyoshi for failing to support him in the Siege of Odawara (1590).

The temple was protected by the Tokugawa shogunate in the Edo period and the main hall was rebuilt in the Genroku era (1688-1701). After the Meiji restoration, the temple rapidly declined due to the Meiji government's anti-Buddhist Haibutsu kishaku policies.

In 1969, a fire due to arson destroyed most of the temple, including the temple treasures and historical records - only the Sanmon gate built during the Tenpō era (1830-1844) remains. The main hall was rebuilt in 1977.

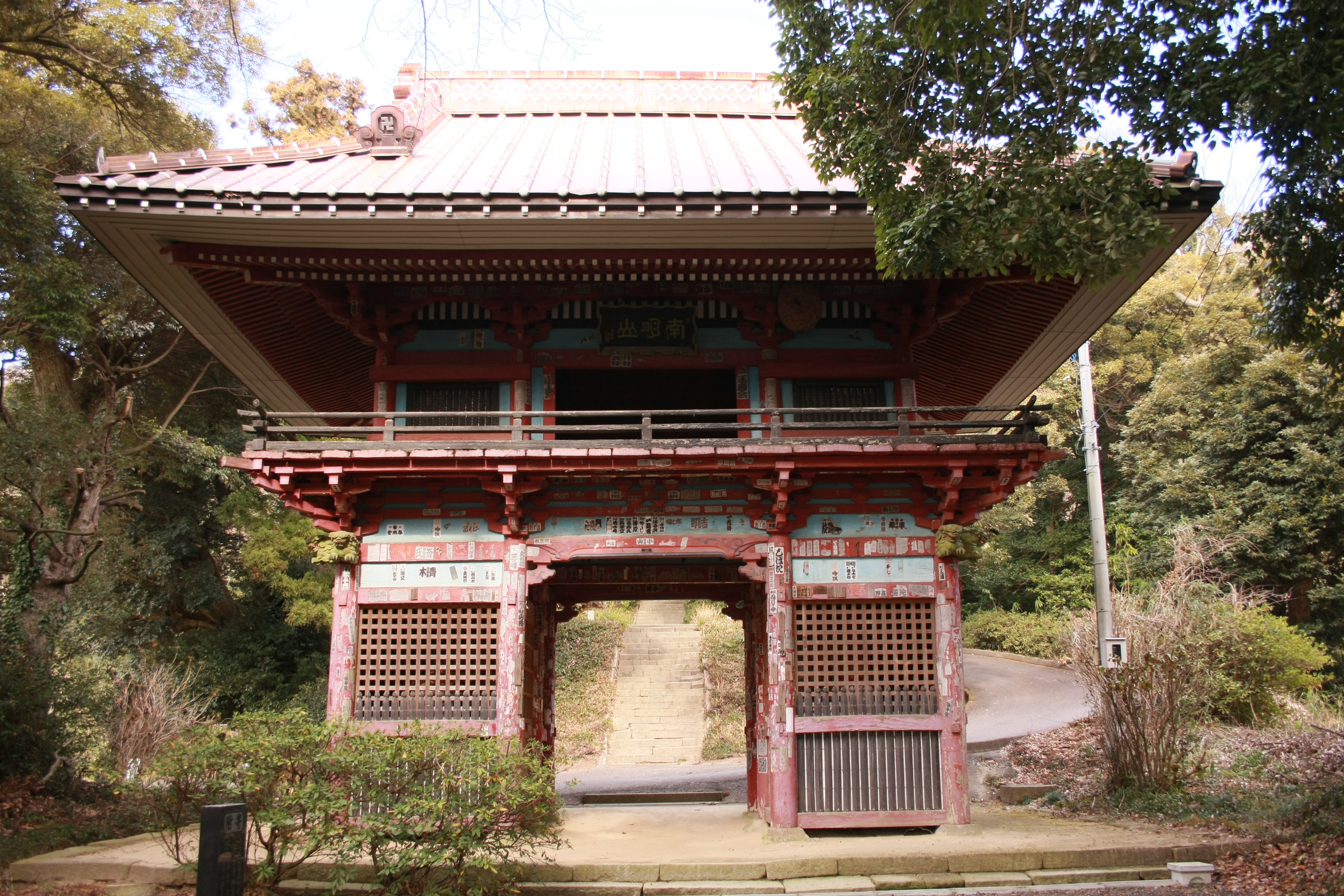
Sanmon

== Bandō Sanjūsankasho (Bandō 33 temple pilgrimage) ==
The temple is the 26th temple on the 33 temple Bandō Sanjūsankasho pilgrimage route.

== Access ==
The temple is located 12 kilometers northwest, or approximately 25-minutes by car, from Tsuchiura Station on the JR East Jōban Line.
