= Seki Castle (Chikusei) =

- 関城
- Tsukuba, Ibaraki Prefecture, Japan
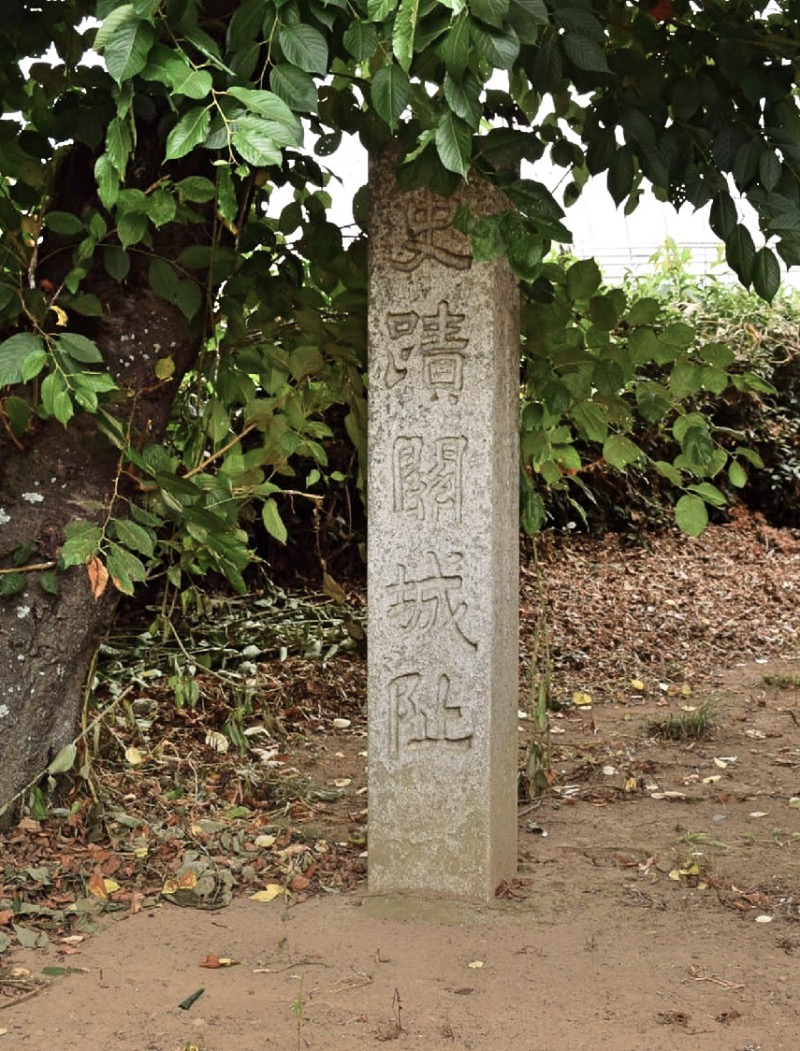
- Site of Seki Castle

Site information
- Type: hirayama-style Japanese castle
- Open to the public: no (No public facilities)
- Condition: ruins

Location
- Seki Castle Seki Castle (Japan)
- Coordinates: 36°13′31.6″N 139°57′49.7″E

Site history
- Built: 1192 AD Kamakura period
- Built by: Seki clan
- In use: Nanboku-chō period
- Demolished: 1343

Seki Castle (関城, Seki-jō) is a hirayama-style Kamakura period Japanese castle located in the Makabe District, Hitachi Province in what is now the city of Chikusei, Ibaraki Prefecture, in the northern Kantō region of Japan. The ruins have been protected as a National Historic Site since 1934.

== Background ==
Seki Castle is located in the Sekitate neighborhood of the southern end of Chikusei City. The castle site is on a plateau on the western part of the Hitachi Plateau surrounded by Kinugawa River and Kokaigawa River. The castle is protected by wetlands to the east, south and west, with earthen ramparts and moats.

The exact date of the castle's foundation is uncertain, but it be believed to have been founded by the fourth son of Yūki Tomohiro, Yūki Tomoyasu, who established a cadet branch of the Yūki clan in the early Kamakura period. During the Nanboku-chō period, Seki Munesuke and his son, Seki Munemasa fought for the Southern Court, and provided shelter for Southern Court general Kitabatake Chikafusa after his defeat at Oda Castle in 1341. This made the castle a target for the Northern Court armies led by Kō no Morofuyu, and after a battle lasting for two years, Seki Castle was overwhelmed and the Seki clan perished. Kitabatake Chikafusa, who wrote an impassioned letter to Yūki Chikatomo based at Shirakawa Castle for assistance, managed to escape the disaster. The castle was abandoned in 1343 along with Daihō Castle.

At present, the site of the castle is mostly under private houses and paddy fields, but fragmentary ruins of earthworks and empty moats remain in various places. The earthworks to the northeast has a height of four meters and a width of five meters at the top, indicating something of the scale of the fortifications. Traces of a pier in the swamp on the lower west side have also been found, indicating that primary access to the castle, for at least part of the year, was by boat. There is also a tunnel dug by sappers during the battle. The site is marked with a number of stone monuments, including a large stone hōkyōintō said to mark the grave of Seki Munesuke and Seki Munemasa.

The castle site is about a 20-minute walk from Tobanoe Station on the Kantō Railway Jōsō Line.

== See also ==
- List of Historic Sites of Japan (Ibaraki)
