= Ōmi-dō =

Buddhist temple in Ibaraki Prefecture, Japan

- 大御堂
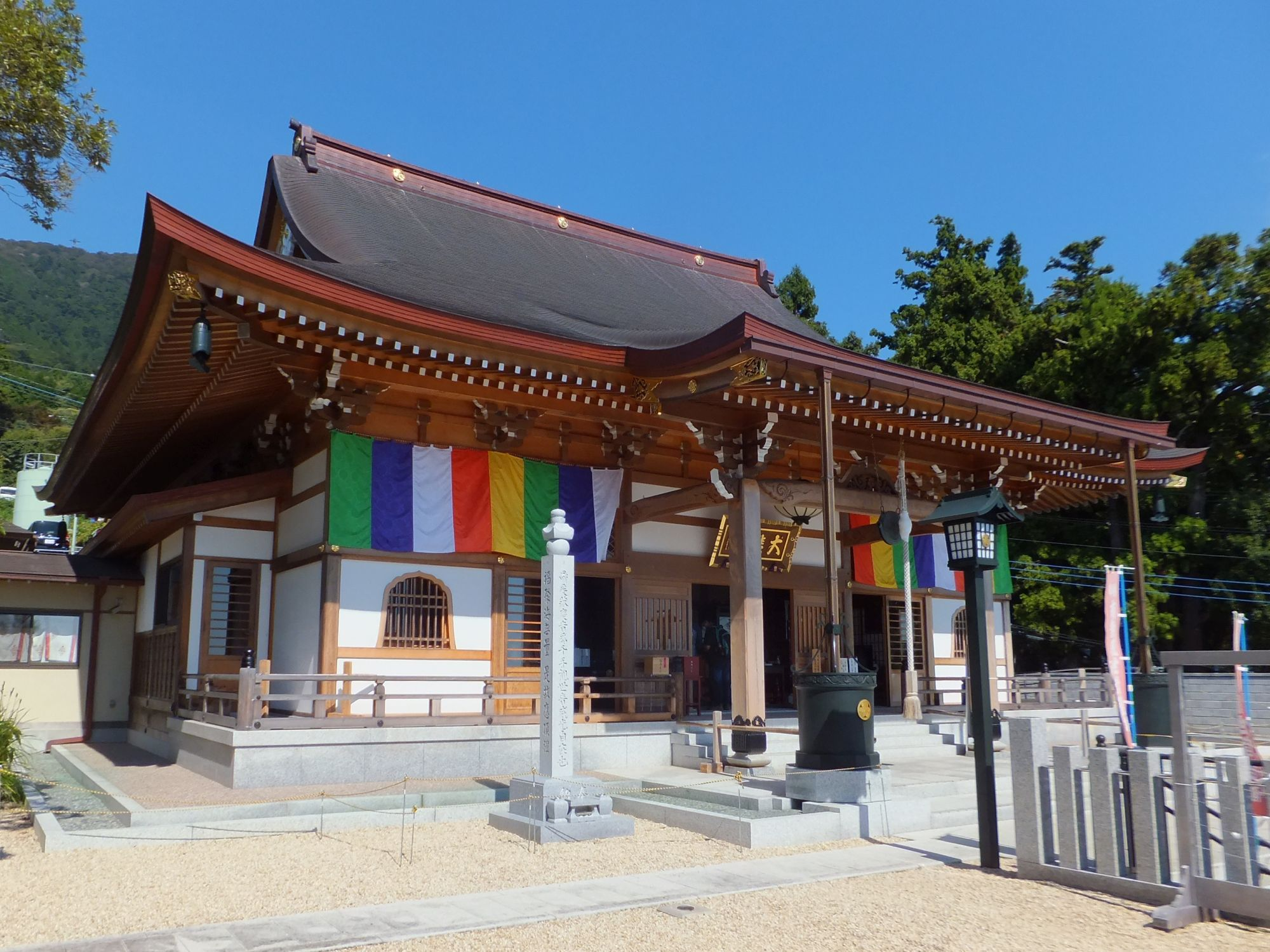
- Ōmi-dō Hondo

- Location within Ibaraki Prefecture Location within Japan

Religion
- Affiliation: Buddhist
- Deity: Jūichimen Kannon Bosatsu
- Rite: Shingon-shu Buzan-ha
- Status: functional

Location
- Location: 748-2 Tsukuba, Tsukuba-shi, Ibaraki-ken
- Country: Japan
- Coordinates: 36°12′45.5″N 140°5′57.9″E

Architecture
- Founder: c.Tokuitsu
- Completed: c.Enryaku period (782-806)

Website
- Official website

Ōmi-dō (大御堂) is a Buddhist temple located in the city of Tsukuba, Ibaraki Prefecture, Japan. It belongs to the Shingon-shu Buzan-ha sect and its honzon is a statue of Juichimen Kannon Bosatsu. The temple's full name is Gokoku-ji Betsuin Tsukuba-zan Chisoku-in Chūzen-ji Ōmi-dō ( 護国寺別院 筑波山 知足院 中禅寺 大御堂).The temple is the 25th stop on the Bandō Sanjūsankasho pilgrimage route. It is a branch of Gokoku-ji in Tokyo.

== Overview ==
Circumstances surrounding the founding of this temple are uncertain. According to the temple's legend, the "Tsukuba Daigongen" was founded by the Hosso sect priest Tokuitsu in the Enryaku period (782–806) on the middle slopes of Mount Tsukuba. Later, Kukai rebuilt the temple as a Shingon sect temple and renamed it Chisoku-in Chūzen-ji (which should not be confused with the temple of Chūzen-ji on the shores of the lake of the same name near Nikko). Since ancient times, Mount Tsukuba has been revered as a "holy mountain", and the temple was closely connected with the Tsukubasan Shrine and the Shugendō mountain cults.

The temple fell into decline, and was revived in 1394 as a Tendai temple, and revived again in the early Edo Period, when it reverted to the Shingon sect. During the Edo period, it was responsible for the prayers of the Tokugawa shogunate and the Shogun's family, and possessed a large amount of temple land, especially in the Kanda area of downtown Edo, who the Edo Chisoku-in was noted for its goma fire ceremonies.

Shogun Tokugawa Iemitsu sponsored a large-scale rebuilding of the temple at Mount Tsukuba, creating a shichidō garan full temple complex. However, with the anti-Buddhist Haibutsu kishaku movement of the early Meiji government the temple lost its estates, most of its treasures and most of its ancient documentation, and was abandoned 1871, with the only honzon image protected by local believers.

The Ōmi-dō chapel was rebuilt in 1930 to house this image, under the protection of Gokoku-ji in Tokyo. In February 2020, a new Main Hall was completed.

== Bandō Sanjūsankasho (Bandō 33 temple pilgrimage) ==
The temple is the 25th temple on the 33 temple Bandō Sanjūsankasho pilgrimage route.

== Access ==
The Ōmi-dō is located approximately 15.4 kilometers, or 30-minutes by car from Shimotsuma Station on the Kantō Railway Jōsō Line.
