= Satake-ji =

Buddhist temple in Ibaraki Prefecture, Japan

- 佐竹寺
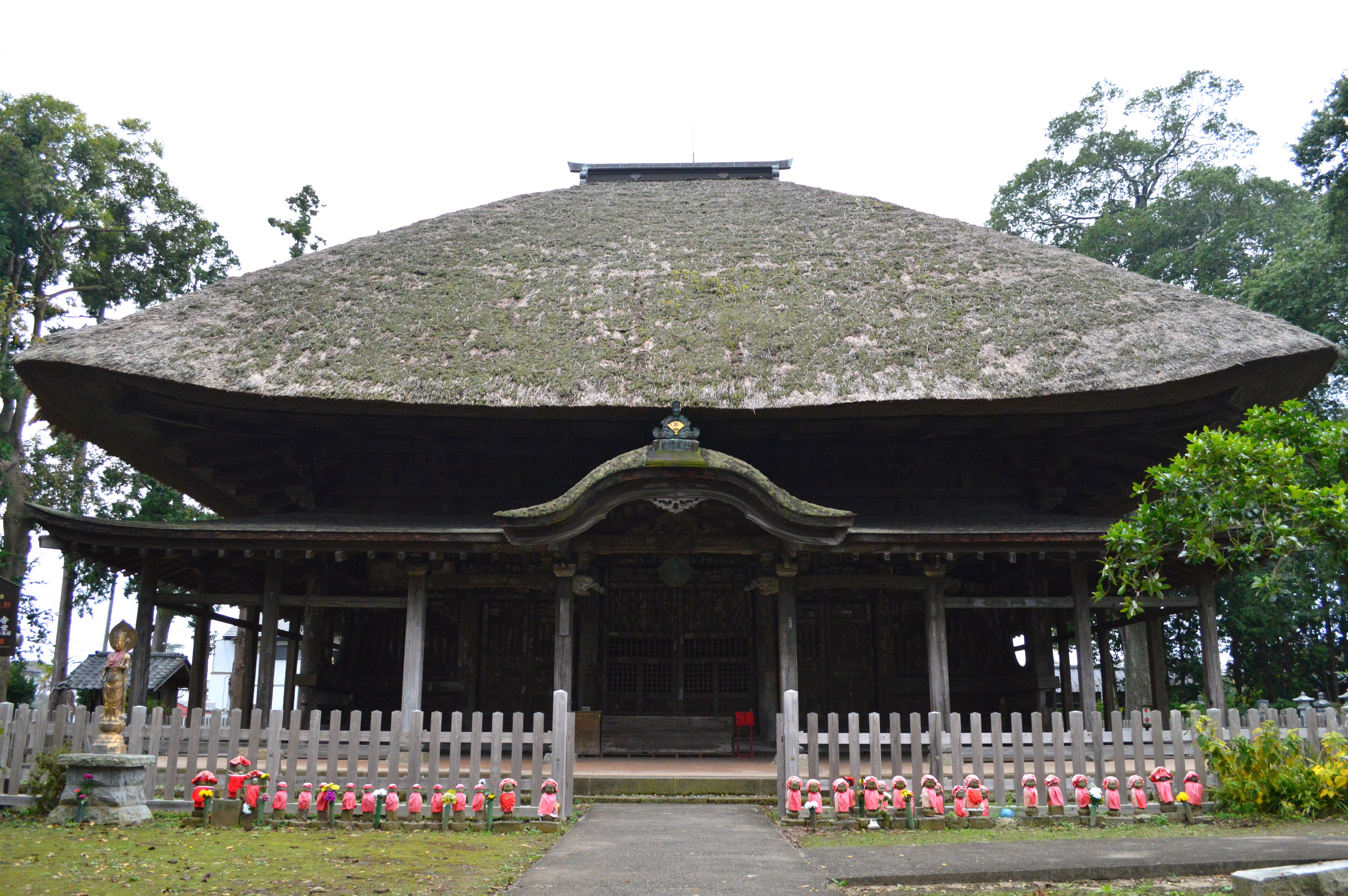
- Kannon-dō (ICP)

- Location within Ibaraki Prefecture Location within Japan

Religion
- Affiliation: Buddhist
- Deity: Jūichimen Kannon Bosatsu
- Rite: Shingon-shu Buzan-ha
- Status: functional

Location
- Location: 2404 Tenjinbayashicho, Hitachiota-shi, Ibaraki-ken
- Country: Japan
- Interactive map of Satake-ji
- Coordinates: 36°31′33.7″N 140°30′16.8″E

Architecture
- Founder: c.Tokuitsu or Emperor Kazan
- Completed: c.807 or c.985
- Important Cultural Property

Satake-ji (佐竹寺) is a Buddhist temple located in the Tenjinbayashi-chō neighborhood of the town of Hitachiōta, Ibaraki Prefecture, Japan. It belongs to the Buzan-branch of Shingon Buddhism and its honzon is a statue of Jūichimen Kannon Bosatsu, also popularly known as the Kitamuke Kannon (北向観音). The temple's full name is Myōfuku-zan Myōn-in Satake-ji (妙福山 明音院 佐竹寺).The temple is the 22nd stop on the Bandō Sanjūsankasho pilgrimage route.

== Overview ==
The exact circumstances surrounding the foundation of this temple are uncertain. According to the temple's legend, it was founded by the scholar-monk Tokuitsu in the second year of Daidō (807). However it is mentioned, in the official records of the Bandō Sanjūsankasho pilgrimage, that the cloistered Emperor Kazan, who was on a pilgrimage to the area in the first year of Kanwa (985), found a book written by Prince Shotoku stating that he established a temple to house a statue of the Jūichimen Kannon that had been carved by Genmitsu Shonin.

Cloistered Emperor Kazan had a dream in which many incarnations of the gods appeared and demanded that a temple be built at this location, which was sacred to Yamato Takeru and seven generations of kami, for the protection of the nation.

At the time of its construction, the temple was called "Kannon-ji" and was located on the peak of Horosaki, a hill northwest of its current location. Minamoto no Yoshimitsu's grandson, Minamoto no Masayoshi, donated territory to the temple in 1140 and used it as a place of prayer. It is said that Masayoshi found a bamboo with only one knot at this temple, and thus changed the name of his clan to the Satake clan. The temple was reconstructed again in 1269 by Satake Nagayoshi.

The temple was burnt down in the battles of the Sengoku period in 1543, but was rebuilt at its current location in 1546 by Satake Yoshiaki, the 18th generation chieftain of the Satake clan, to protect Satake Castle (Ota Castle) from evil spirits.

The temple declined after the 1600 Battle of Sekigahara, when the Satake clan was transferred to Dewa Province. Even so, during the Edo period it was popular as a pilgrimage destination, and was patronized by Mito Domain, who made it the 11th of a miniature pilgrimage circuit of 33 temples sacred to Kannon within Mito Domain.

After the Edo period, the temple fell into disrepair due to the anti-Buddhist Haibutsu kishaku policies of the early Meiji period. It was abandoned for several decades until it was revived in 1940.

== Temple buildings ==
The Niōmon gate was rebuilt in 1940, but contains statues from the Hōei era (1704–1711). The Main Hall dates from the late Momoyama period (1467–1572) and is unusual in that it is orientated to the north. It was designated as a National Important Cultural Property (ICP) in 1906.

== Temple building images ==
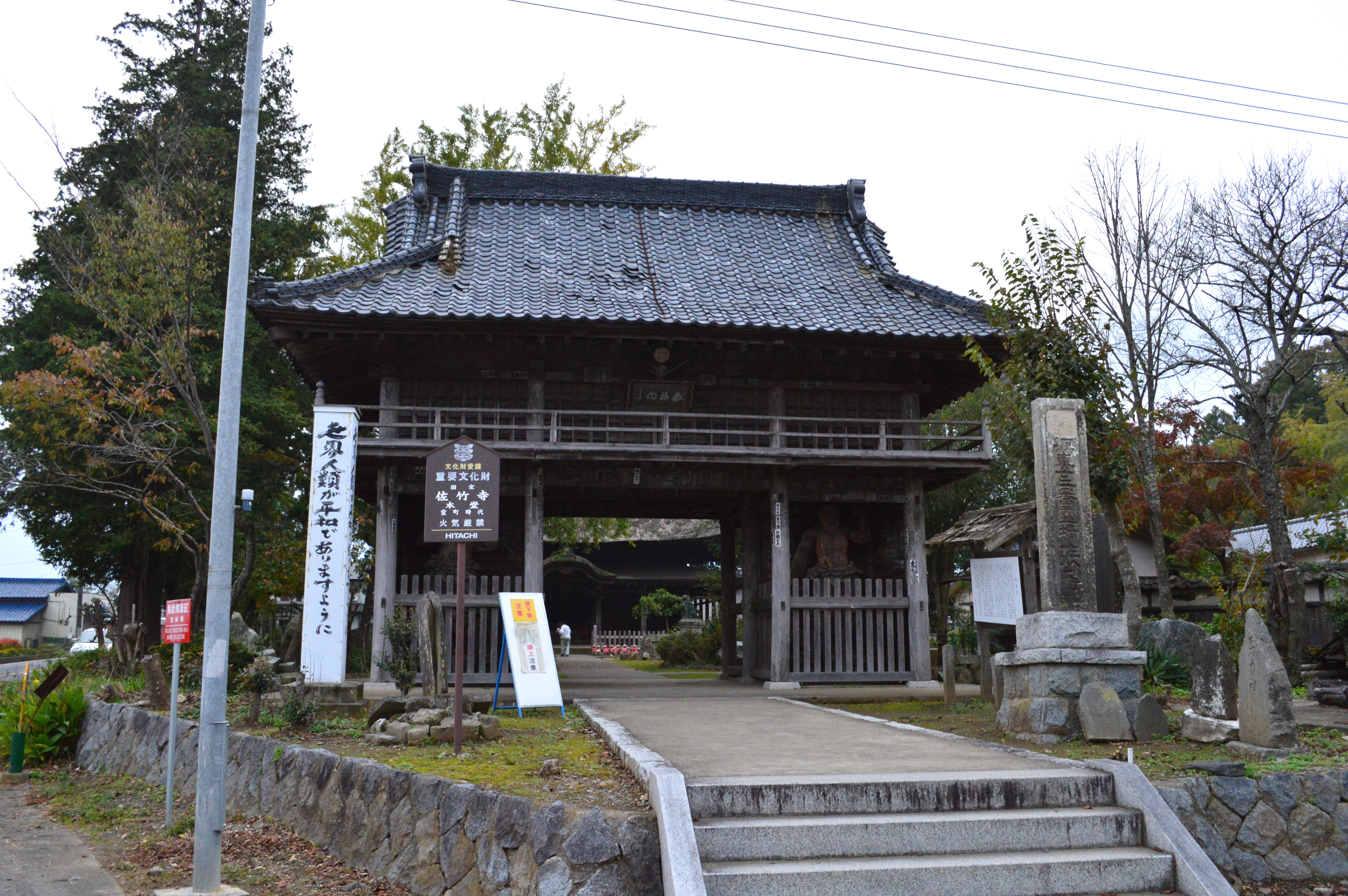
Niōmon

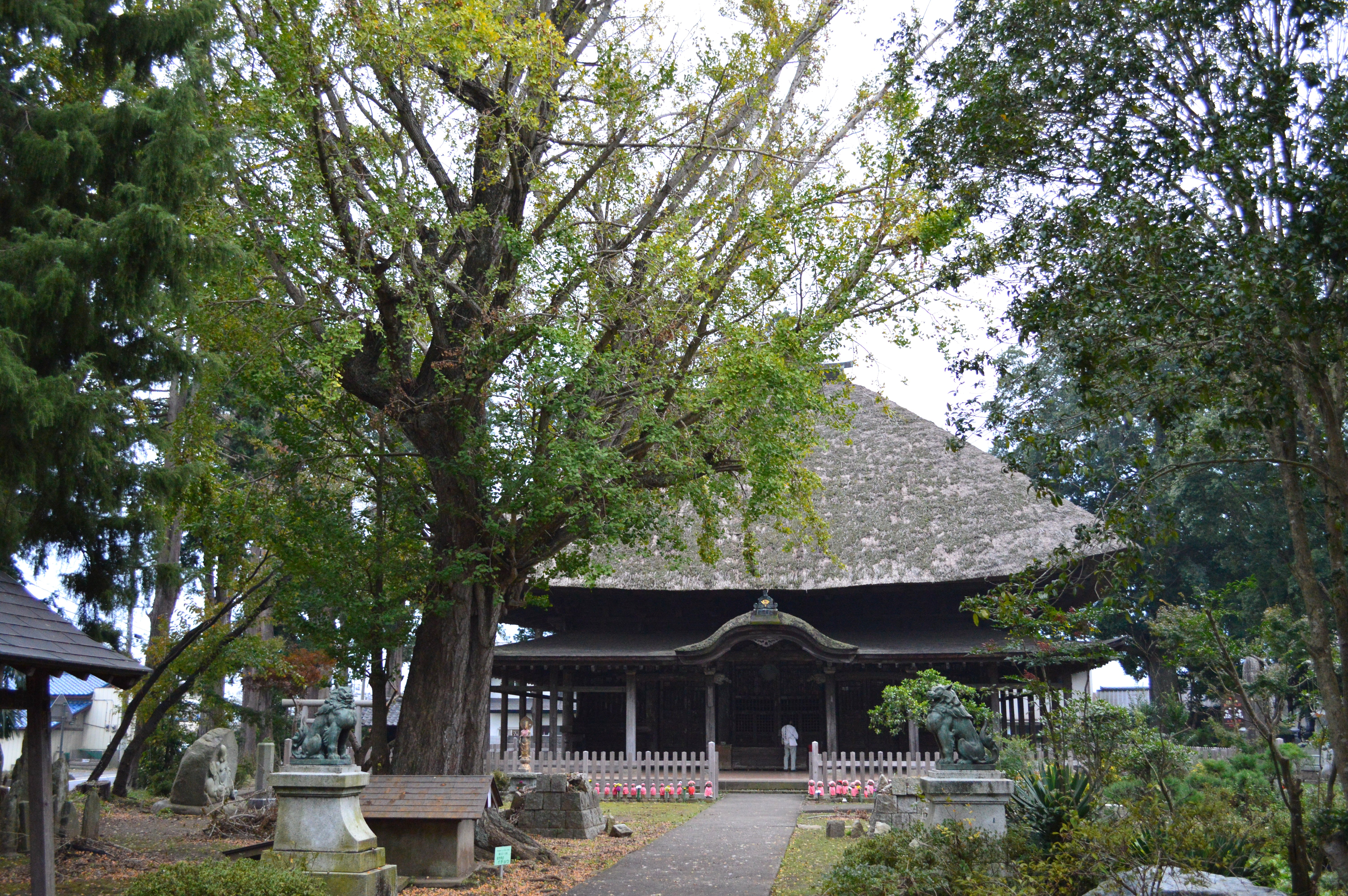
Precincts

== Bandō Sanjūsankasho (Bandō 33 temple pilgrimage) ==
The temple is the 22nd temple on the 33 temple Bandō Sanjūsankasho pilgrimage route.

== Access ==
The temple is located 2.6 kilometers west, or approximately five minutes by car, from Hitachi-Ōta Station on the JR East Suigun Line.

== Cultural Properties ==
=== National Important Cultural Properties ===
- Hondō (本堂), early Momoyama period. The main hall is a hipped five x five bay structure with a thatched roof, with a shingle-roofed veranda surrounding the main building, and a gabled entry. During the Genroku era, a major remodeling was carried out by inserting large beams, removing the six pillars in the hall, replacing the floor with tile paving, installing a coffered ceiling, modifying the area around the windows and doorways. The front flower-headed window, the pillars, the connecting beams of the outer temple, the shrimp rainbow liangs, and the kumihimo, all retain the characteristics of Momoyama period architecture.
