= Ōtagō Station =

Railway station in Chikusei, Ibaraki Prefecture, Japan

Ōtagō Station 大田郷駅
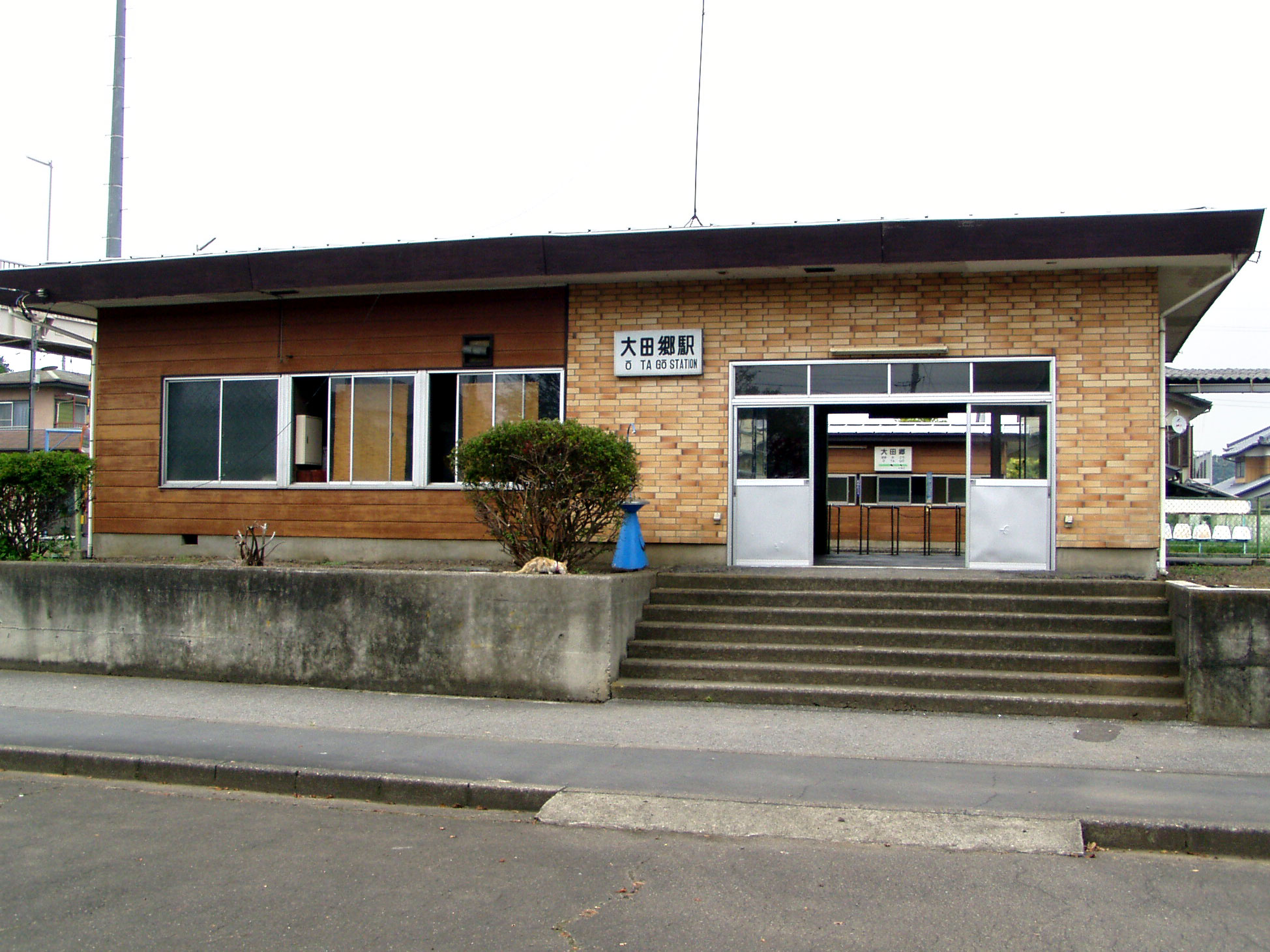
- Ōtagō Station, August 2007

General information
- Location: Tamado 1623-2, Chikusei-shi, Ibaraki-ken 308-0847; Japan
- Coordinates: 36.2782°N 139.9596°E
- Operator: Kantō Railway
- Line: ■ Jōsō Line
- Distance: 47.3 km from Toride
- Platforms: 2 side platforms

Other information
- Status: Unstaffed
- Website: Official website

History
- Opened: 11 January 1913; 113 years ago

Passengers
- FY2018: 149 daily

Services
Preceding station	Kantō Railway	Following station
Kurogo towards Toride	Jōsō Line Local	Shimodate Terminus
Location
- Location within Ibaraki Prefecture Location within Japan

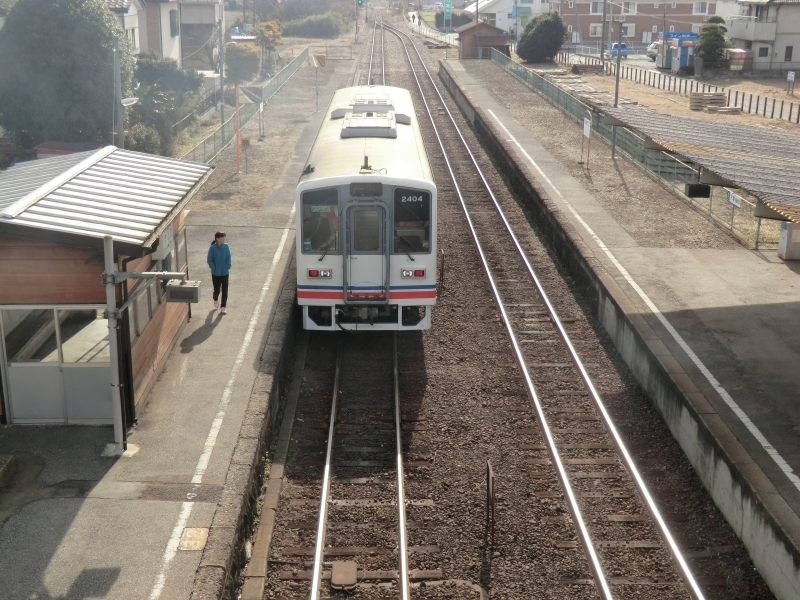
Platforms, 2012

Ōtagō Station (大田郷駅, Ōtagō-eki) is a passenger train station in the city of Chikusei, Ibaraki, Japan, operated by the private railway company Kantō Railway.

== Lines ==
Ōtagō Station is a station on the Jōsō Line, and is located 47.3 km (29.4 mi) from the official starting point of the line at Toride Station.

== Station layout ==
The station consists of two opposed side platforms, connected to the station building by a level crossing.

=== Platforms ===
1	■ Jōsō Line	for Shimodate
2	■ Jōsō Line	for Moriya and Toride

== History ==
Ōtagō Station was opened on 11 January 1913 as a station on the Jōsō Railroad, which became the Kantō Railway in 1965. The now defunct Jōsō Railroad Kinugawa Line operated from this station from 1926 to 1964.

== Passenger statistics ==
In fiscal 2018, the station was used by an average of 149 passengers daily (boarding passengers only).

== Surrounding area ==
- Shimodate Nishikata Post Office

== See also ==
- List of railway stations in Japan
