= Oda Ujiharu =

16th century Japanese warlord

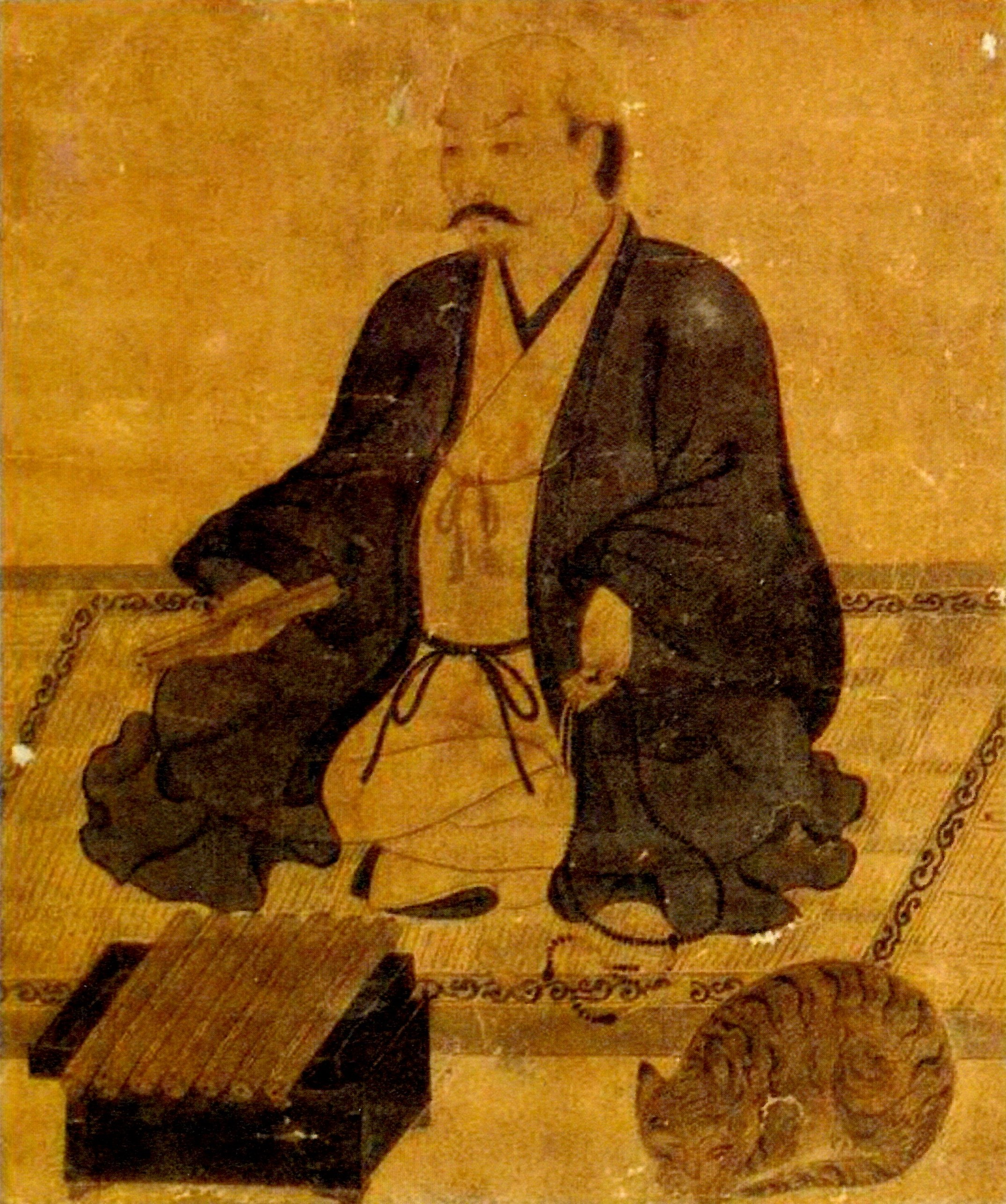
Oda Ujiharu (c.1534–1602)

Oda Ujiharu (小田 氏治) (1534–1602) was a warlord of the Japanese province of Hitachi during the Sengoku Period of the 16th century.

== Family ==
Ujiharu was the son of Oda Masaharu and held the Oda Castle in Hitachi Province as a local power.

== History ==
When Ujiharu came to power from 1548, Ujiharu was very hard pressed by the Yūki and Satake clans and the state of his clan was in decline.

He participated in the Siege of Odawara (1561) under Uesugi Kenshin against Hōjō clan.

Ujiharu was defeated by the Satake in 1569 and lost Oda Castle. He finally surrendered to the Satake in 1583, having to give all of his family as hostages.

From 1590, Ujiharu was completely deprived of his remaining holdings.

== Personality ==
It is known that Ujiharu deeply loved renga.
