= Kurogo Station =

Railway station in Chikusei, Ibaraki Prefecture, Japan

Kurogo Station 黒子駅
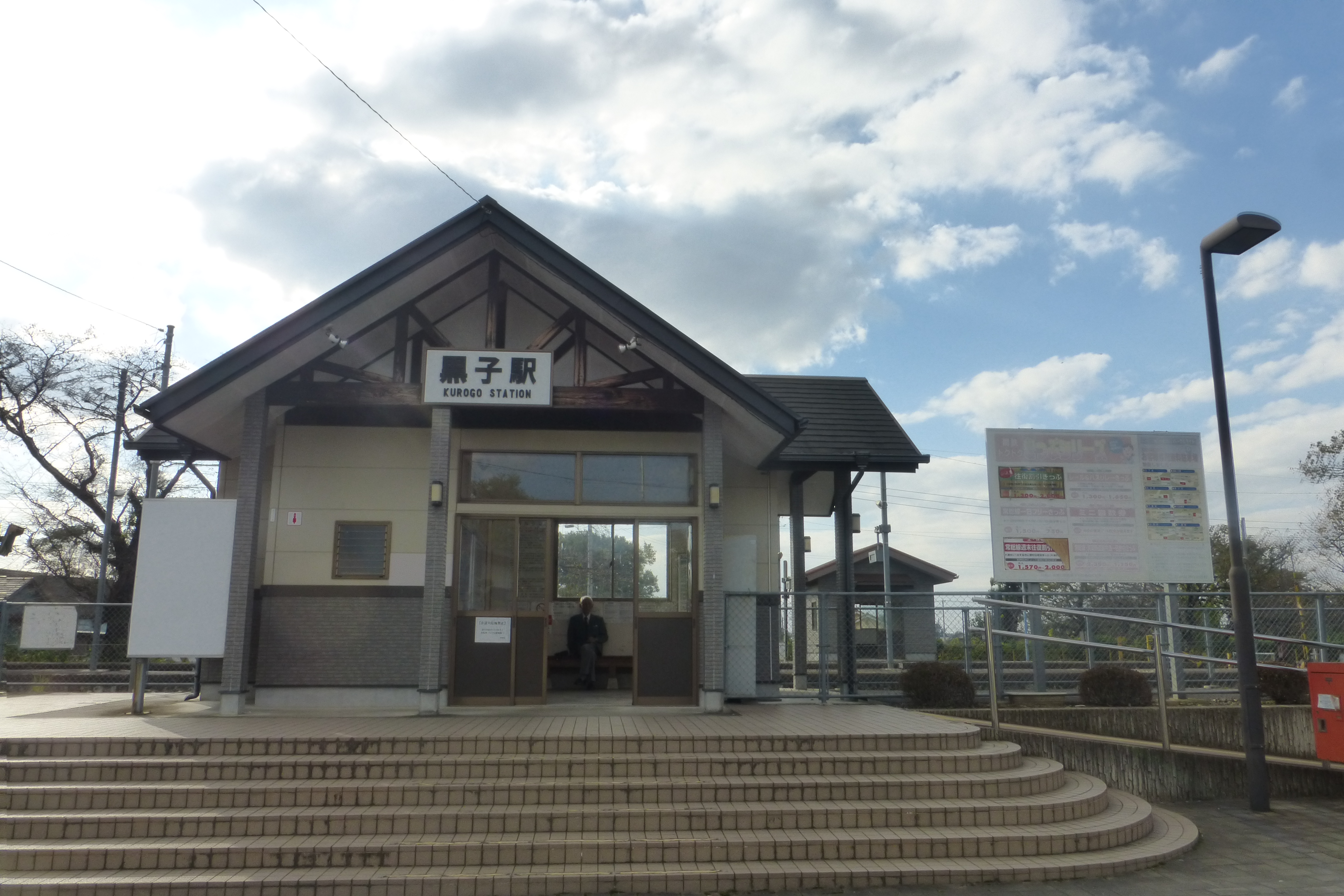
- Kurogo Station, October 2016

General information
- Location: Tsuji 1520-3, Chikusei-shi, Ibaraki-ken 308-0103; Japan
- Coordinates: 36.2473°N 139.9753°E
- Operator: Kantō Railway
- Line: ■ Jōsō Line
- Distance: 43.6 km from Toride
- Platforms: 1 side + 1 island platforms

Other information
- Status: Unstaffed
- Website: Official website

History
- Opened: 11 January 1913; 113 years ago

Passengers
- FY2018: 78 daily

Services
Preceding station	Kantō Railway	Following station
Tobanoe towards Toride	Jōsō Line Local	Ōtagō towards Shimodate
Location
- Location within Ibaraki Prefecture Location within Japan

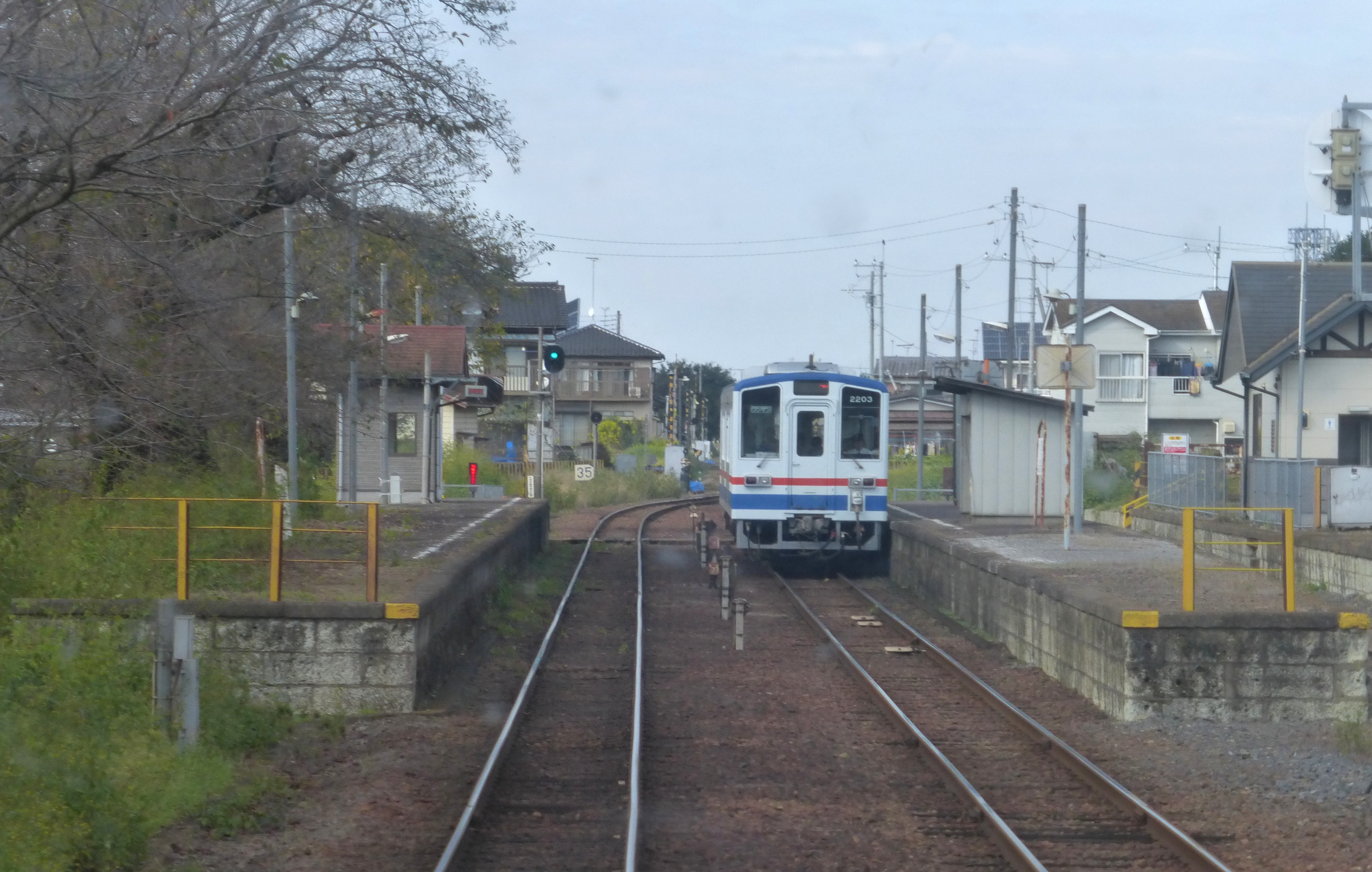
Platforms, 2016

Kurogo Station (黒子駅, Kurogo-eki) is a passenger train station in the city of Chikusei, Ibaraki, Japan, operated by the private railway company Kantō Railway.

== Lines ==
Kurogo Station is a station on the Jōsō Line, and is located 43.6 km (27.1 mi) from the official starting point of the line at Toride Station.

== Station layout ==
The station consists of one side platform and one island platform, connected to the station building by a level crossing. The station is unattended.

=== Platforms ===
1	■ Jōsō Line	not in normal operation
2	■ Jōsō Line	for Moriya and Toride
3	■ Jōsō Line	for Shimodate

== History ==
Kurogo Station was opened on 11 January 1913 as a station on the Jōsō Railroad, which became the Kantō Railway in 1965. The station building was rebuilt in August 2003.

== Passenger statistics ==
In fiscal 2018, the station was used by an average of 78 boarding passengers daily.

== Surrounding area ==
- Kurogo Post Office

== See also ==
- List of railway stations in Japan
