= Daihō Station =

Railway station in Shimotsuma, Ibaraki Prefecture, Japan

Daihō Station 大宝駅
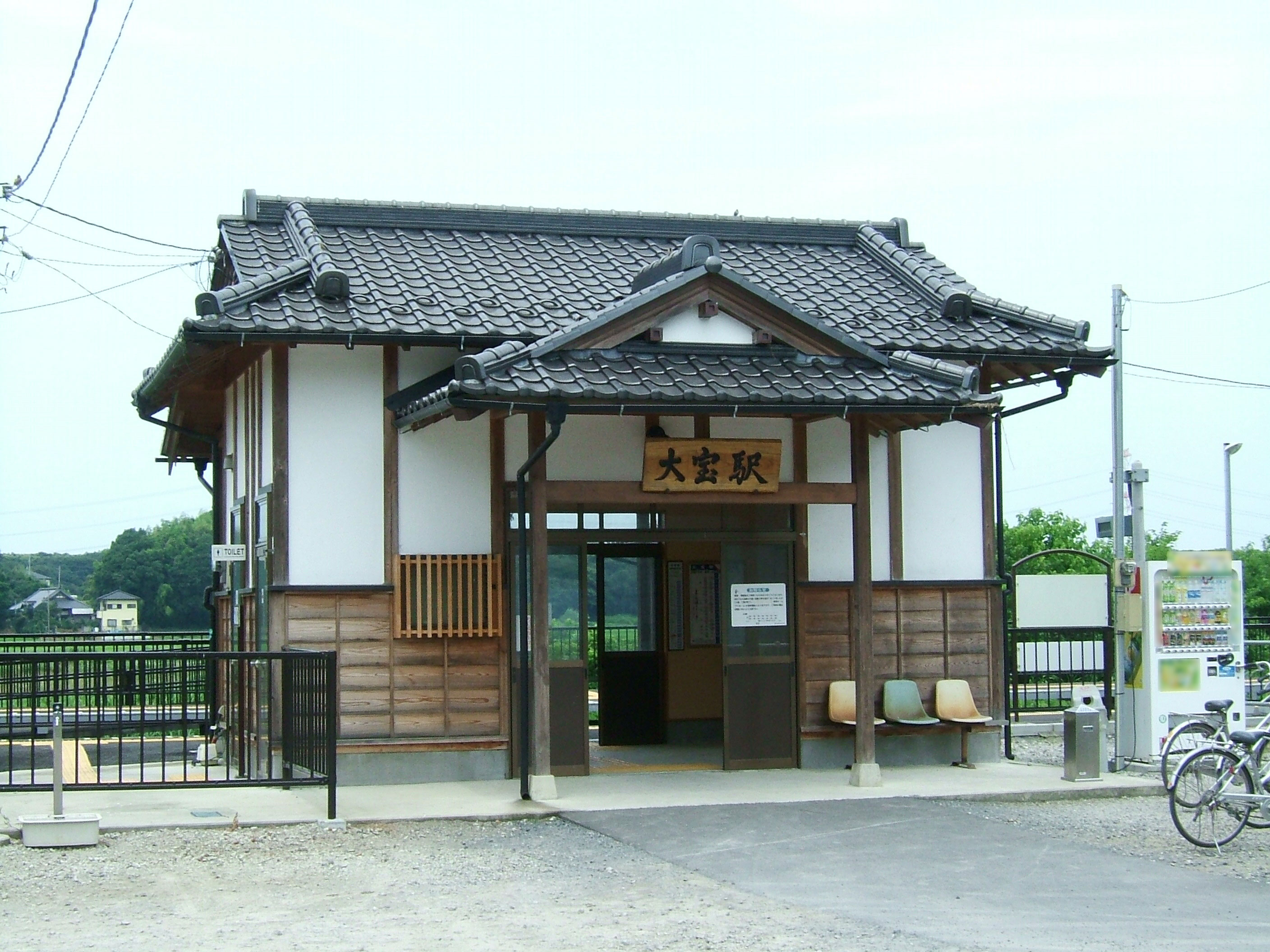
- Daihō Station, July 2008

General information
- Location: Daihō 233-9, Shimotsuma-shi, Ibaraki-ken 304-0027; Japan
- Coordinates: 36°12′11″N 139°58′13″E
- Operator: Kantō Railway
- Line: ■ Jōsō Line
- Distance: 38.7 km from Toride
- Platforms: 2 side platforms

Other information
- Status: Unstaffed
- Website: Official website

History
- Opened: 1917; 109 years ago

Passengers
- FY2017: 96

Services
Preceding station	Kantō Railway	Following station
Shimotsuma towards Toride	Jōsō Line Local	Tobanoe towards Shimodate
Location
- Location within Ibaraki Prefecture Location within Japan

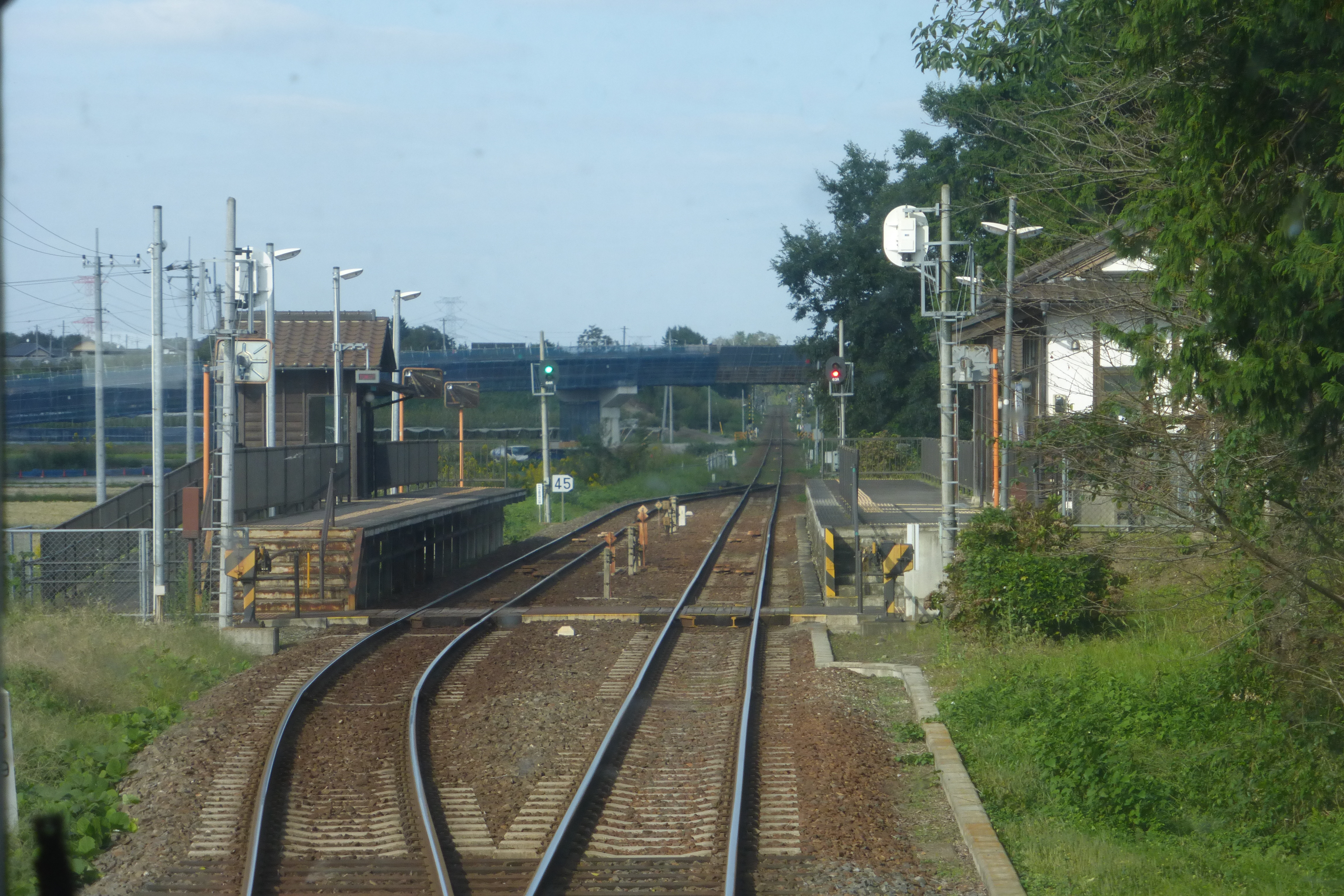
Platforms, 2016

Daihō Station (大宝駅, Daihō-eki) is a passenger railway station in the city of Shimotsuma, Ibaraki Prefecture, Japan operated by the private railway company Kantō Railway.

== Lines ==
Daihō Station is a station on the Jōsō Line, and is located 38.7 km (24.0 mi) from the official starting point of the line at Toride Station.

== Station layout ==
The station consists of two opposed side platforms connected to the station building by a level crossing. The station is unattended.

=== Platforms ===
1	■ Jōsō Line	for Moriya and Toride
2	■ Jōsō Line	for Shimodate

== History ==
Daihō Station was opened in 1917 as a station on the Jōsō Railroad, which became the Kantō Railway in 1965. The station building was rebuilt in 2005.

== Passenger statistics ==
In fiscal 2017, the station was used by an average of 96 passengers daily (boarding passengers only).

== Surrounding area ==
- Daihō Post Office
- Daihō Hachiman-gu

== See also ==
- List of railway stations in Japan
