= Shimotsuma Station =

Railway station in Shimotsuma, Ibaraki Prefecture, Japan

Shimotsuma Station 下妻駅
- Shimotsuma Station, April 2026

General information
- Location: Shimotsumaotsu 363-2, Shimotsuma-shi, Ibaraki-ken 304-0067; Japan
- Coordinates: 36.1822°N 139.9651°E
- Operator: Kantō Railway
- Line: ■ Jōsō Line
- Distance: 36.1 km from Toride
- Platforms: 1 side + 1 island platform

Other information
- Status: Staffed
- Website: Official website

History
- Opened: 1 November 1913; 112 years ago

Passengers
- FY2017: 1734

Services
Preceding station	Kantō Railway	Following station
Ishige towards Toride	Jōsō Line Rapid	Shimodate Terminus
Sōdō towards Toride	Jōsō Line Local	Daihō towards Shimodate
Location
- Location within Ibaraki Prefecture Location within Japan

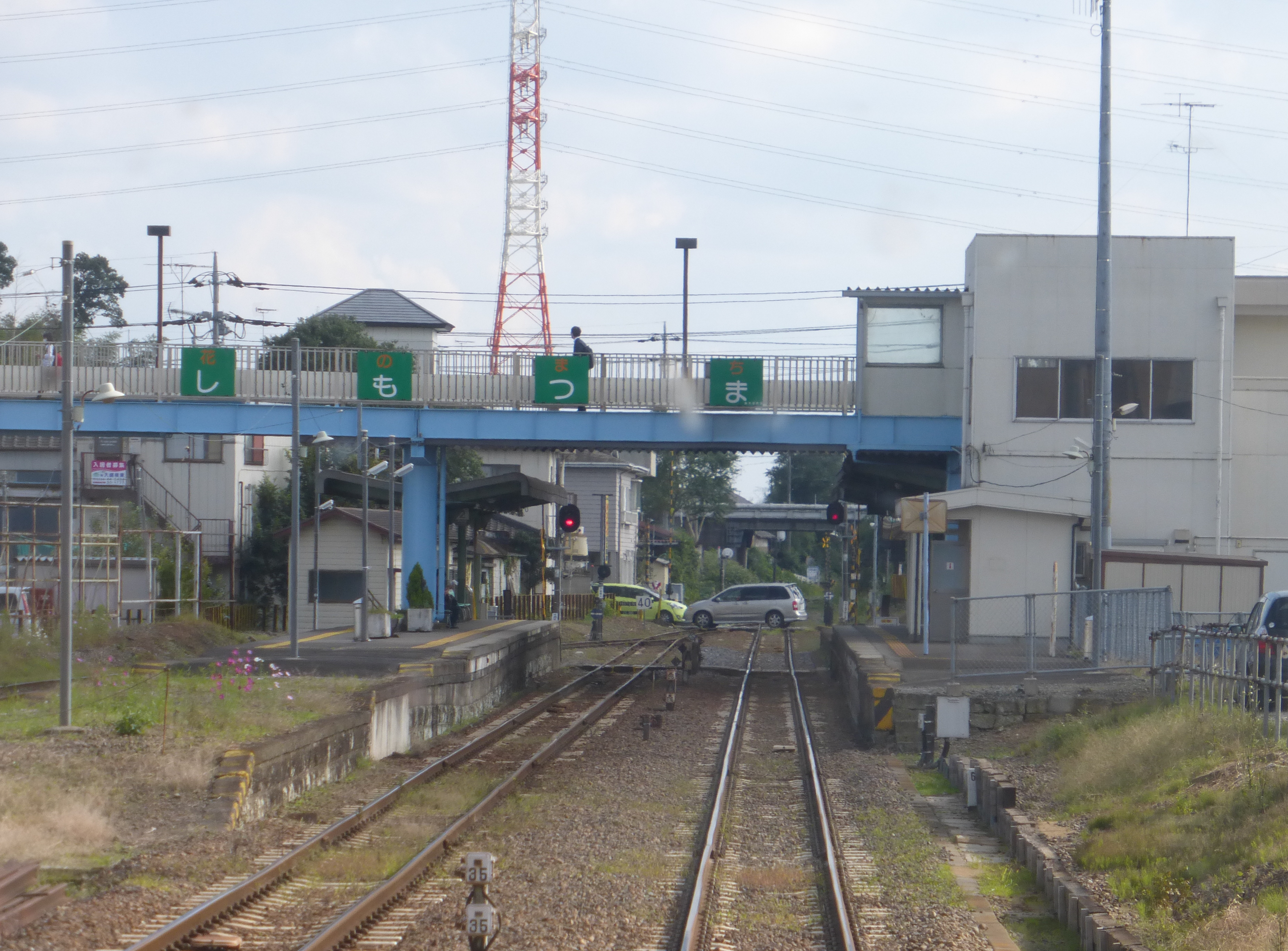
Platforms, 2016

Shimotsuma Station (下妻駅, Shimotsuma-eki) is a passenger railway station in the city of Shimotsuma, Ibaraki Prefecture, Japan operated by the private railway company Kantō Railway.

== Lines ==
Shimotsuma Station is a station on the Jōsō Line, and is located 36.1 km (22.4 mi) from the official starting point of the line at Toride Station.

== Station layout ==
The station has one side platform and one island platform, connected to the station building by both a level crossing and a footbridge. The station is staffed.

=== Platforms ===
1	■ Jōsō Line	for Shimodate
2	■ Jōsō Line	for Moriya and Toride
3	■ Jōsō Line	not in normal operation

== History ==
Shimotsuma Station was opened on 1 November 1913 as a station on the Jōsō Railroad, which became the Kantō Railway in 1965. The station building was rebuilt in 2005.

== Passenger statistics ==
In fiscal 2017, the station was used by an average of 1734 passengers daily (boarding passengers only).

== Surrounding area ==
- Shimotsuma City Hall
- Shimotsuma Post Office
- National Route 125

== See also ==
- List of railway stations in Japan
