= Tobanoe Station =

Railway station in Shimotsuma, Ibaraki Prefecture, Japan

Tobanoe Station 騰波ノ江駅
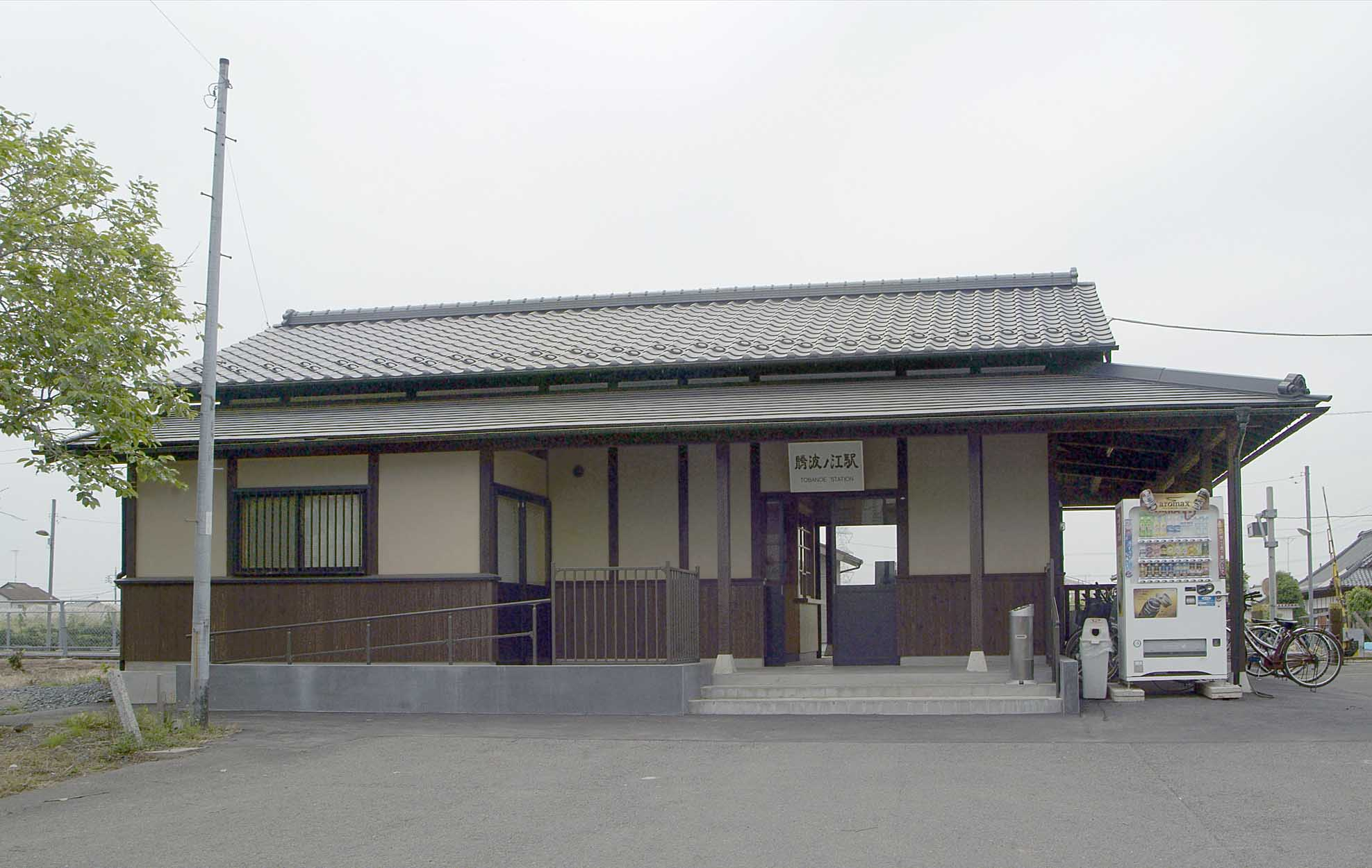
- Tobanoe Station, May 2009

General information
- Location: Wakayanagi 533-7, Shimotsuma-shi, Ibaraki-ken 304-0012; Japan
- Coordinates: 36.2232°N 139.9765°E
- Operator: Kantō Railway
- Line: ■ Jōsō Line
- Distance: 41.0 km from Toride
- Platforms: 2 side platforms

Other information
- Status: Unstaffed
- Website: Official website

History
- Opened: 15 August 1926; 100 years ago

Passengers
- FY2017: 79

Services
Preceding station	Kantō Railway	Following station
Daihō towards Toride	Jōsō Line Local	Kurogo towards Shimodate
Location
- Location within Ibaraki Prefecture Location within Japan

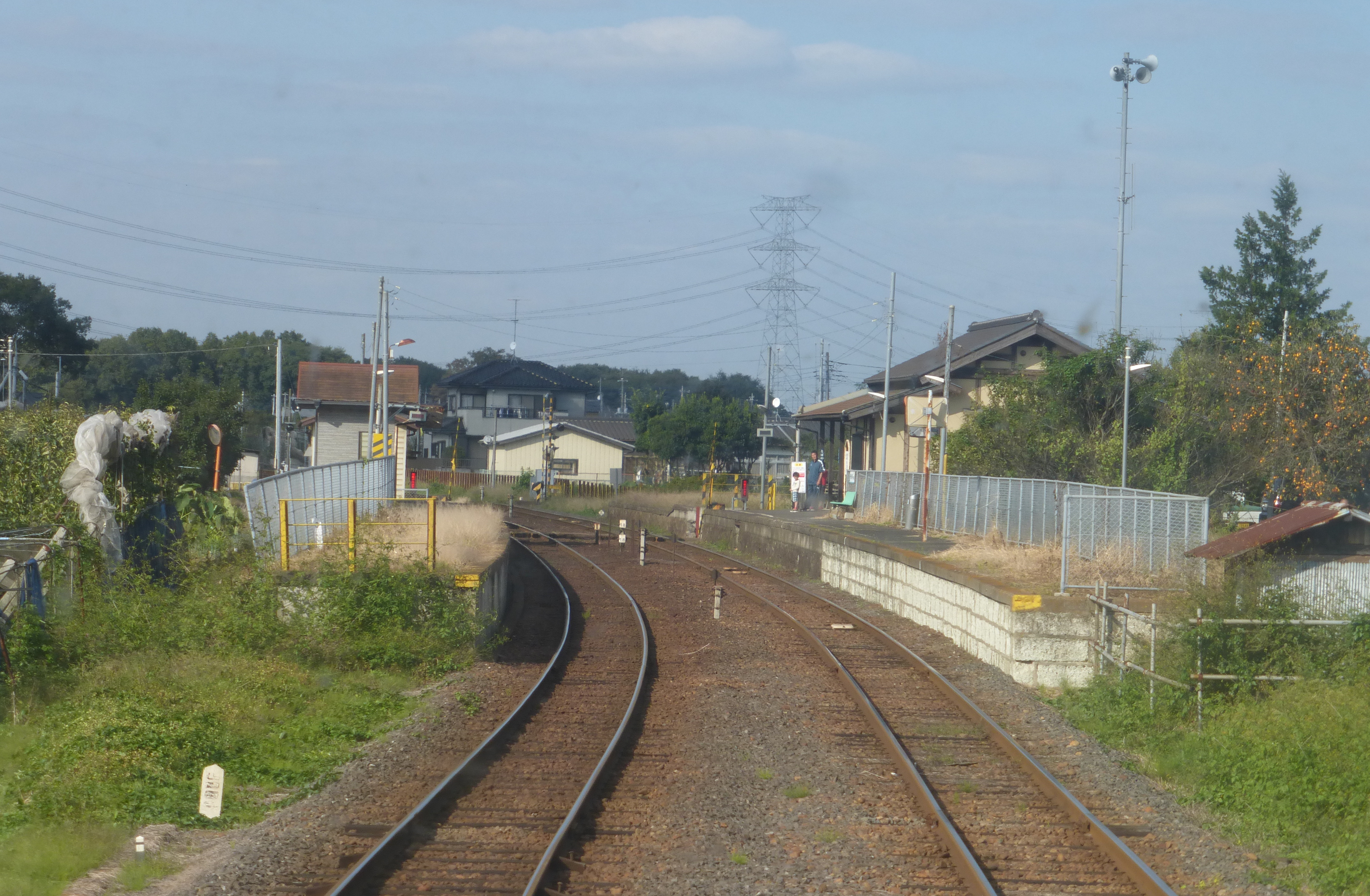
Platforms, 2016

Tobanoe Station (騰波ノ江駅, Tobanoe-eki) is a passenger railway station in the city of Shimotsuma, Ibaraki Prefecture, Japan operated by the private railway company Kantō Railway.

== Lines ==
Tobanoe Station is a station on the Jōsō Line, and is located 41.0 km (25.5 mi) from the official starting point of the line at Toride Station.

== Station layout ==
The station has two opposed side platforms connected to the station building by a level crossing. The station is unattended.

=== Platforms ===
1	■ Jōsō Line	for Shimodate
2	■ Jōsō Line	for Moriya and Toride

== History ==
Tobanoe Station was opened on 15 August 1926 as a station on the Jōsō Railroad, which became the Kantō Railway in 1965. The station building was rebuilt in October 2008.

== Passenger statistics ==
In fiscal 2017, the station was used by an average of 79 passengers daily (boarding passengers only).

== Surrounding area ==
- Shimotsuma Road Station

== See also ==
- List of railway stations in Japan
