= Kō no Morofuyu =

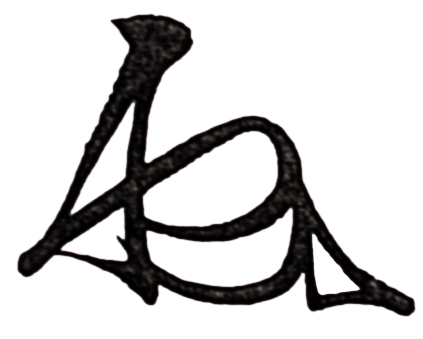
Morofuyu's kaō (monogram)

Kō no Morofuyu (高師冬; died 13 February 1351) was a Japanese samurai lord who, together with his cousins Moronao and Moroyasu, was one of shogun Ashikaga Takauji's most important generals during the Nanboku-chō period. He was adopted as a son by Moronao. He was kami (守・長官; highest of the four administrative positions of the ritsuryō system) of Mikawa Province, shugo (governor) of Musashi Province and Kantō kanrei. Defeated by Uesugi Noriaki during the Kannō disturbance, he committed seppuku in Kai in 1351.

== Career ==
Like many others men of this period, Morofuyu began his career in 1336, at the end of the Kenmu Restoration. He fought many battles all over the country, including 1336's attack to Mount Hiei. In 1338, together with cousin Moroyasu, he went to fight against Southern Court forces in Aonohara, Mino Province, to help contain Kitabatake Akiie, who was threatening Kyoto. The next year he was made Kantō shitsuji, counsellor to Ashikaga Yoshiakira, holding the post until 1344. He proved successful in this role against both the pro-Ashikaga Tadayoshi Uesugi clan and against Hitachi Province's Kitabatake Chikafusa, who was the main military force behind the Southern court. He left Kamakura to attack loyalist troops in 1339 and 1340 in Hitachi and then proceeded to defeat Chikafusa again in December 1341. On September the following year, he surrounded and attacked Seki Castle, a major fort of the Southern court. Two years later in 1343, Chikafusa was driven out of Kantō where he then left for Yoshino. He was concurrently also shugo of Musashi Province from 1341 to 1344.

Morofuyu was then ordered to return to Kyoto, and in 1347 sent to Ise Province as shugo, in which role he fought several battles. In 1349 Takauji sent his son Motouji to the Kantō to take the place of his other son Yoshiakira, whom he wanted in Kyoto, stabilize the area and protect his interests there. Since Motouji was then just a child, real power was in the hands of the two shitsuji Uesugi Noriaki and Morofuyu himself, men who were politically enemies. In 1350, during the so-called Kannō disturbance, a civil war that saw the two Ashikaga brothers fight each other, the differences between the two deepened past the breaking point. He remained with Takauji, while Noriaki defected and went with Tadayoshi. In 1351 he left Motouji in Kamakura to attack Noriaki. Defeated and pursued by his forces, he committed seppuku at Suzawa Castle (須沢城) in Kai Province.

== See also ==
- Go-Daigo
