= Oda Castle =

- 小田城
- Tsukuba, Ibaraki Prefecture, Japan
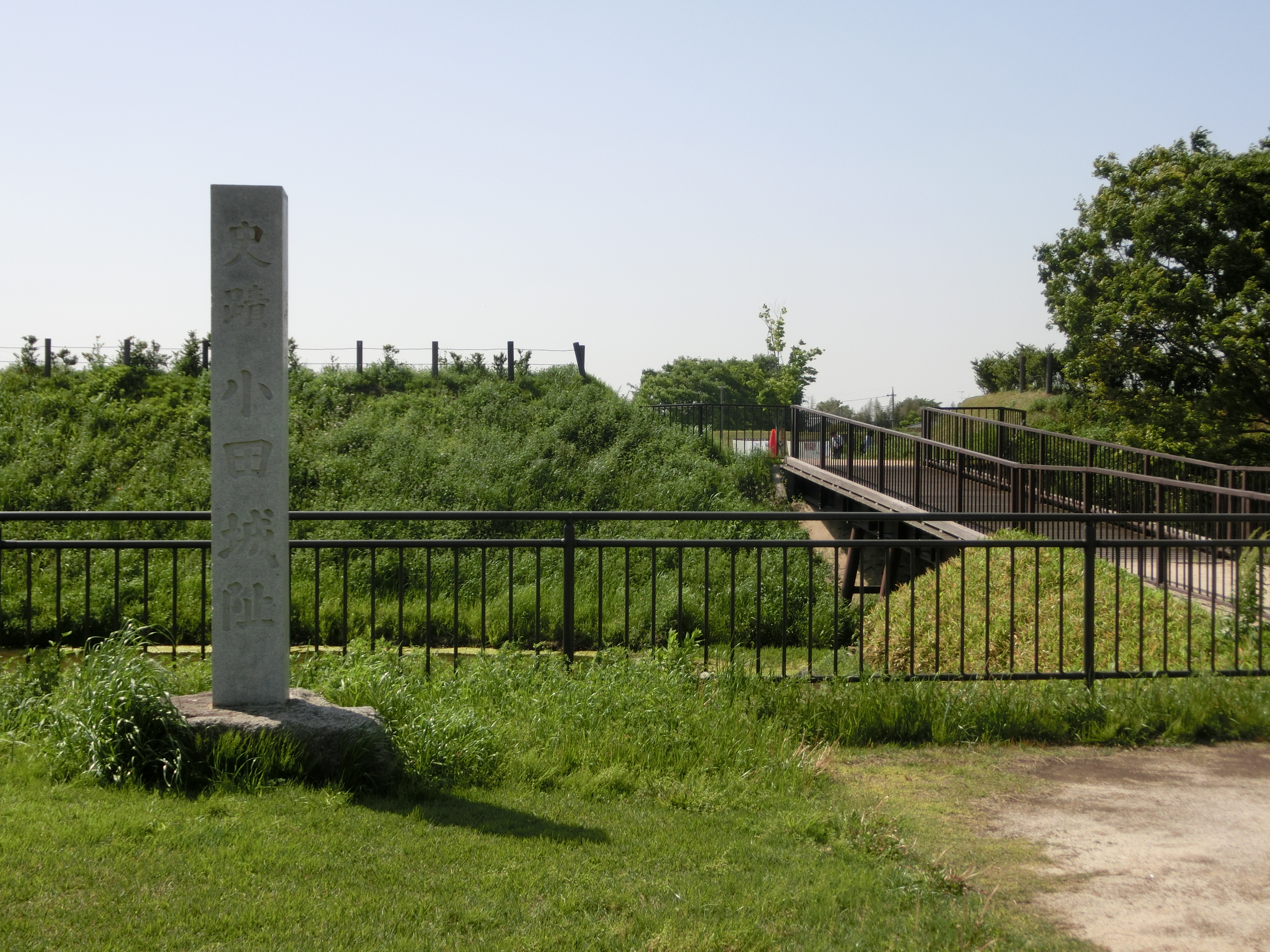
- Oda Castle ruins

Site information
- Type: hira-style Japanese castle
- Open to the public: yes (museum on site)
- Condition: ruins, partial reconstruction

Location
- Oda Castle
- Location within Ibaraki Prefecture Location within Japan
- Coordinates: 36°9′2″N 140°6′39.2″E

Site history
- Built: Kamakura period
- Built by: Hatta clan
- In use: Kamakura to Sengoku period
- Demolished: 1600

Oda Castle (小田城, Oda jō) is a hira-style Muromachi period Japanese castle located in what is now the city of Tsukuba, Ibaraki Prefecture, in the northern Kantō region of Japan. It has been protected by the central government as a National Historic Site since 1935.

== Background ==
Oda Castle is located 5 kilometers south of Mount Tsukuba, in southwestern Hitachi Province, overlooking the Sakura River which flows from the northern slope of Mount Tsukuba towards Lake Kasumigaura. Although the surrounding area is a large plain, when the castle was built Lake Kasumigaura extended further inland, and the area surrounding the castle consisted of many smaller rivers and marshes, which divided the territory into numerous defensible islands. Of the many smallholdings in the area, the Oda clan, Hitachi with Oda Castle, was the most powerful. The Oda clan was a cadet branch of the Hatta clan, who were the shugo of Hitachi Province in the Kamakura period.

== History ==
Hotta Tomoie achieved distinction in the campaign against the Northern Fujiwara and was awarded estates in Hitachi Province by Minamoto no Yoritomo. He constructed a fortified residence at the foot of Mount Oda, and his descendants took the surname of "Oda" after this place name. However, later in the Kamakura period, the Hōjō clan gradually expanded into Hitachi, usurping many of the Oda clan's estates. For this reason, the Oda were early and strong supporters of the Kenmu restoration of Emperor Go-Daigo and the overthrow of the Kamakura shogunate. The Oda remained loyal to the Southern Court against Ashikaga Takauji, and during the Nanboku-chō period, Southern Court general Kitabatake Chikafusa made Oda Castle his field headquarters for over a year, and wrote the Jinnō Shōtōki (Chronicles of the Authentic Lineages of the Divine Emperors) defending the Southern Court's claims, while he was at Oda Castle. However, as the Southern Court gradually waned in power, the Oda clan was finally forced to pledge fealty to the Muromachi shogunate. Although the titular title of shugo was lost to the Satake clan, the Oda remained ranked as one of the eight most prestigious clans of the Kantō region.

Into the Sengoku period, the Oda clan was surrounded by more powerful and aggressive neighbors. As the Uesugi clan and Satake clan formed an alliance against the Late Hōjō clan and the Oda and Satake were traditionally hostile to one another, the Oda allied with the Hōjō. Oda Castle was greatly expanded and its defenses strengthened. However, Oda Ujiharu was defeated by the Satake in 1559, and lost Oda Castle in battles with Uesugi Kenshin in 1564 and again in 1566. Each time he retreated to Tsuchiura Castle (which the clan also held) and was able to recover Oda Castle with the support of the local populace. The castle fell to the Satake in 1569, but before Oda Ujiharu could retake it, he was besieged and defeated at Tsuchiura as well in 1573. Normally, this would have been the end of the Oda clan, but Oda Ujiharu was very persistent and waged a ceaseless guerrilla campaign against the Sakate for the next 20 years, at times coming close to recovering Oda Castle. His hopes were extinguished by Toyotomi Hideyoshi in 1590, when the Satake clan submitted and were rewarded with all of Hitachi Province.

The Satake victory was short-lived, as they were transferred to Dewa Province shortly after the Battle of Sekigahara in 1600 by Tokugawa Ieyasu. Oda Castle was abandoned at that time.

== Structure ==
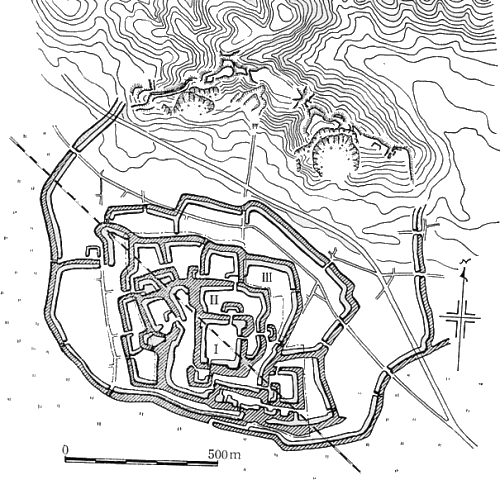
Layout of Oda Castle

Oda Castle is located at the foot of Mount Oda and was originally little more than a fortified manor house with a moat and earthen rampart. During the Sengoku period, it was expanded to include a second, third and fourth concentric enclosure, each with an elaborate maze-like system of water moats. The main residence was located between the inner most and second moat, and occupies as rectangular area approximately 120 by 140 meters. Yagura watchtowers were located at the west, east and south corners. The main gate of the castle was to the north, and the clan's bodaiji temple was to the west. In total, the castle measures approximately one kilometer from east to west, and 700 meters north–south.

== Current situation ==
After the Meiji restoration, the outer area of the castle was lost to urban development, and the ruins of the castle were bisected by the tracks of the now defunct Kanto Railway Tsukuba Line (with the Visitor Center near the castle located on the grounds of the former train station). The main area of the castle remains relatively well preserved and archaeological excavations began to be carried out from 1997 through 2004. A portion of its clay ramparts and marshy moats were restored and the site opened to the public in 2016 as the "Oda Castle Ruins History Plaza".

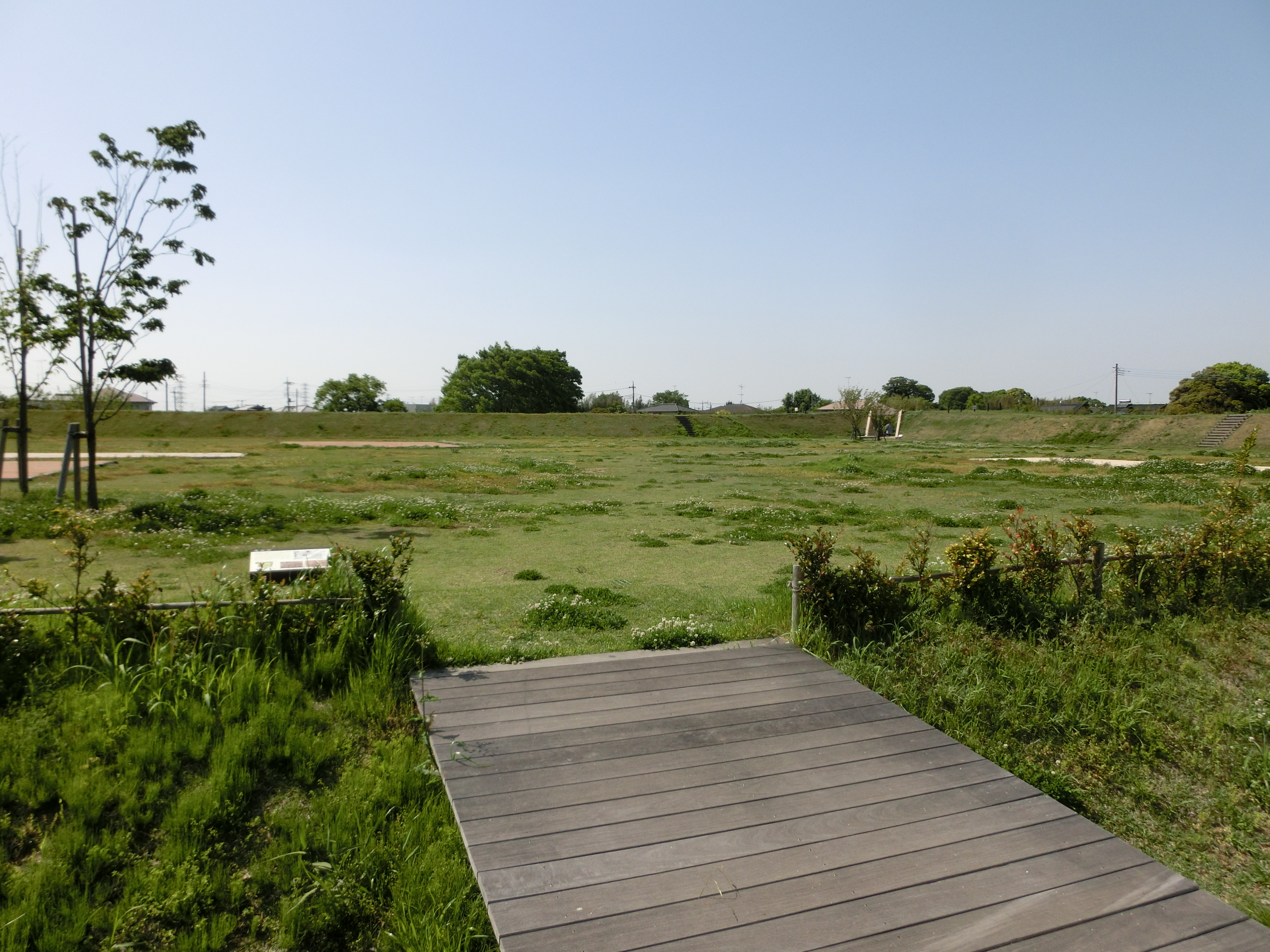
Inner Bailey

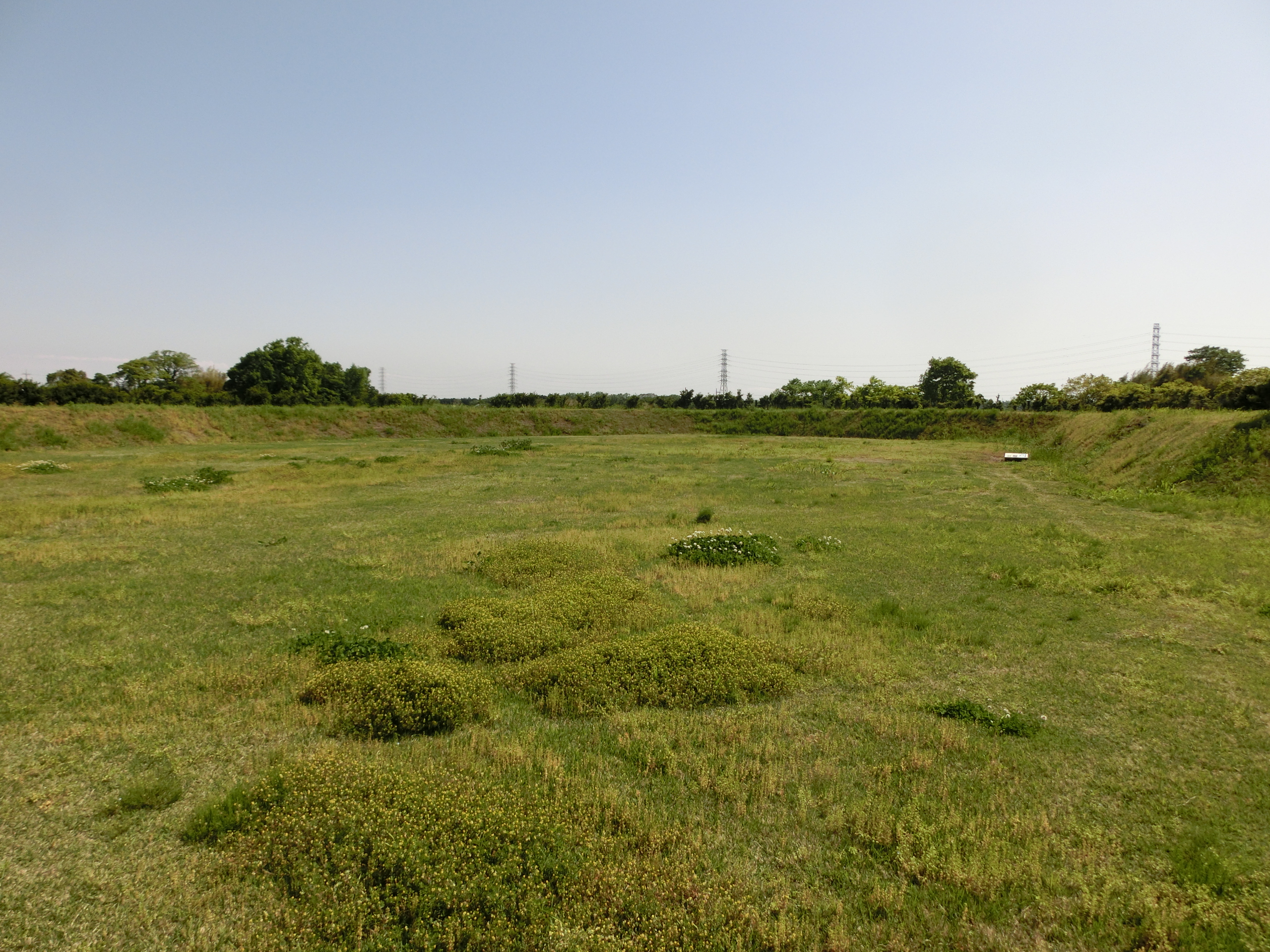
East Kuruwa

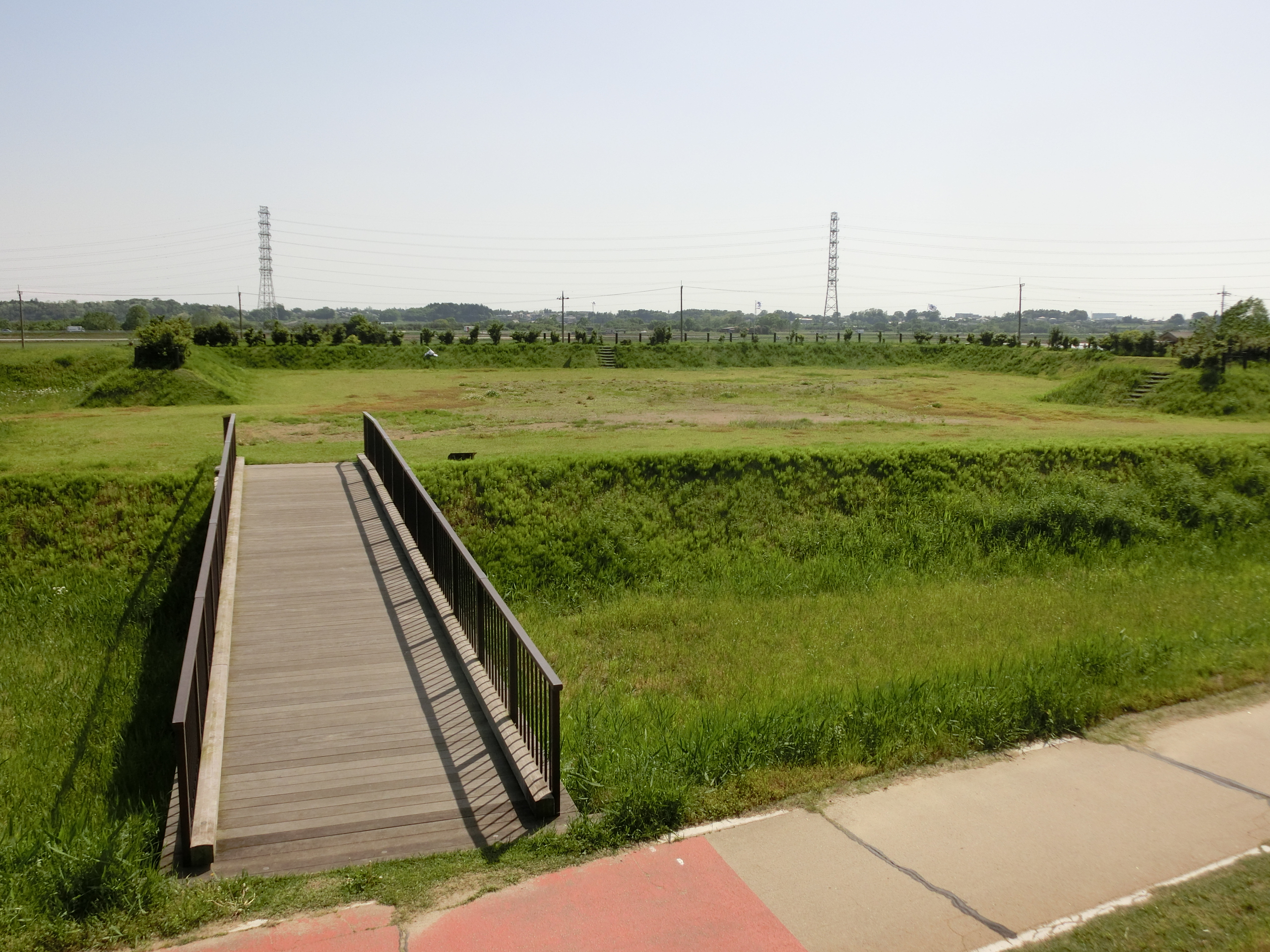
Nishi-umadashi Kuruwa

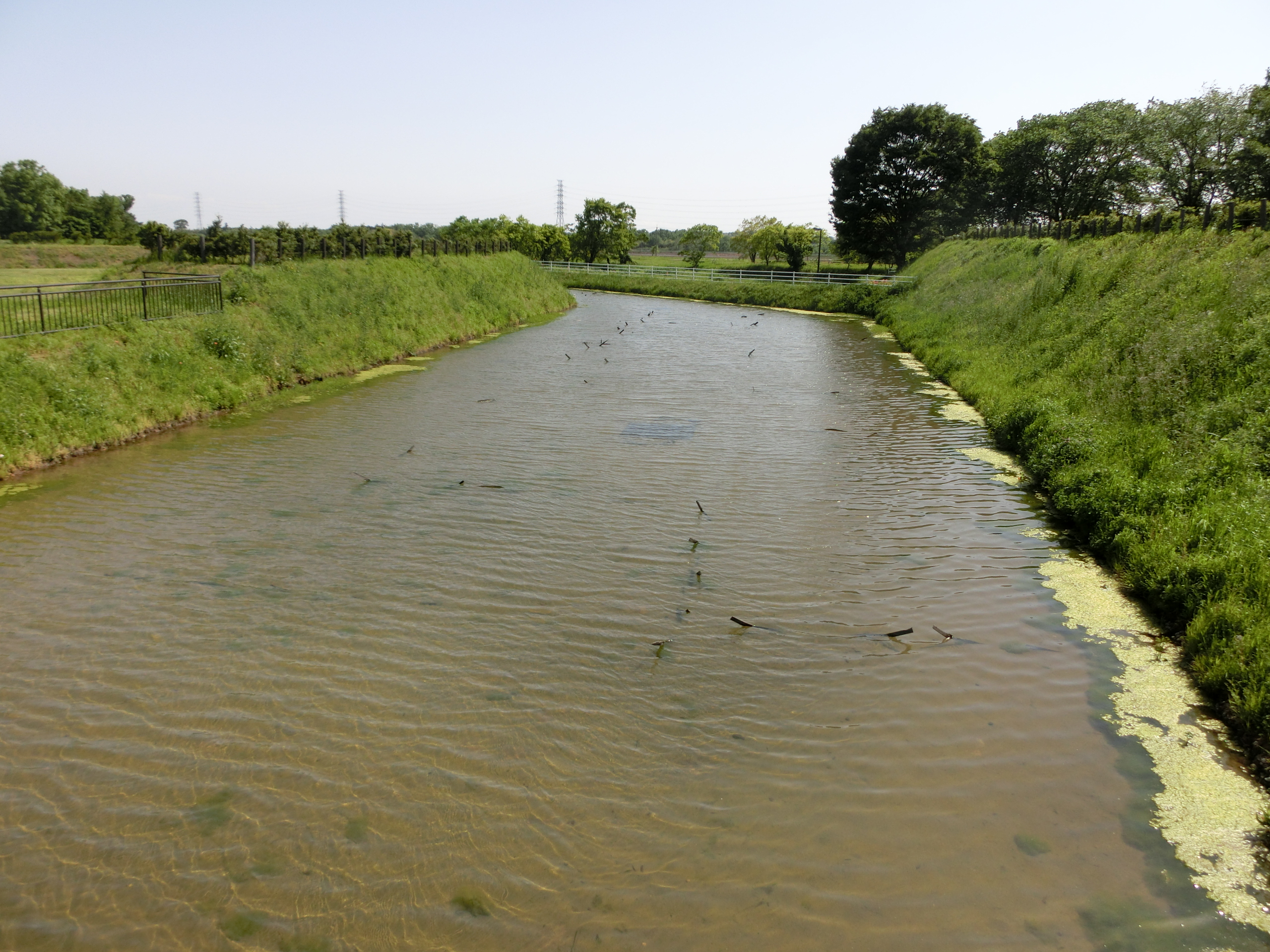
East Moat

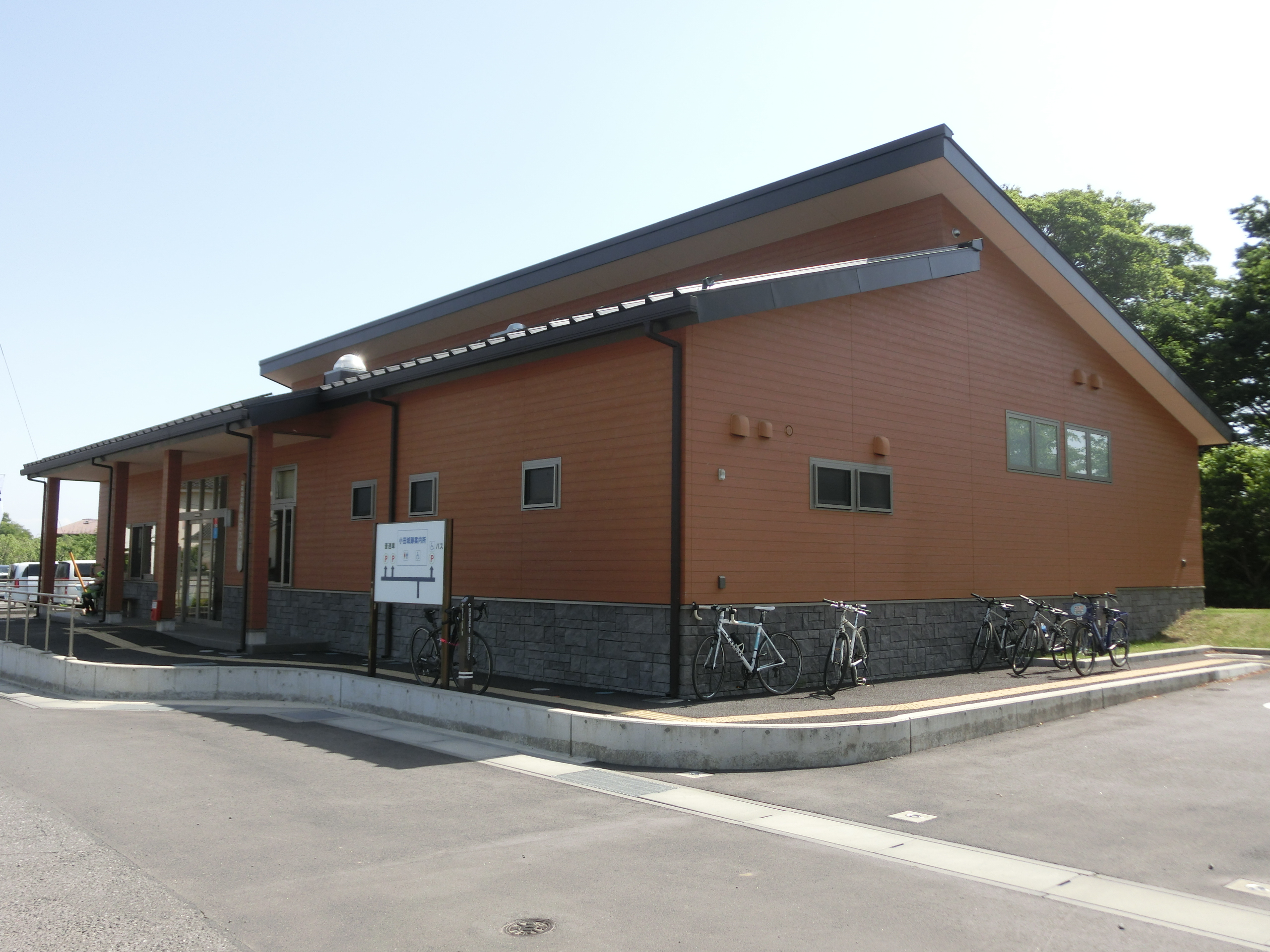
Oda Castle Remains History Plaza Information Center

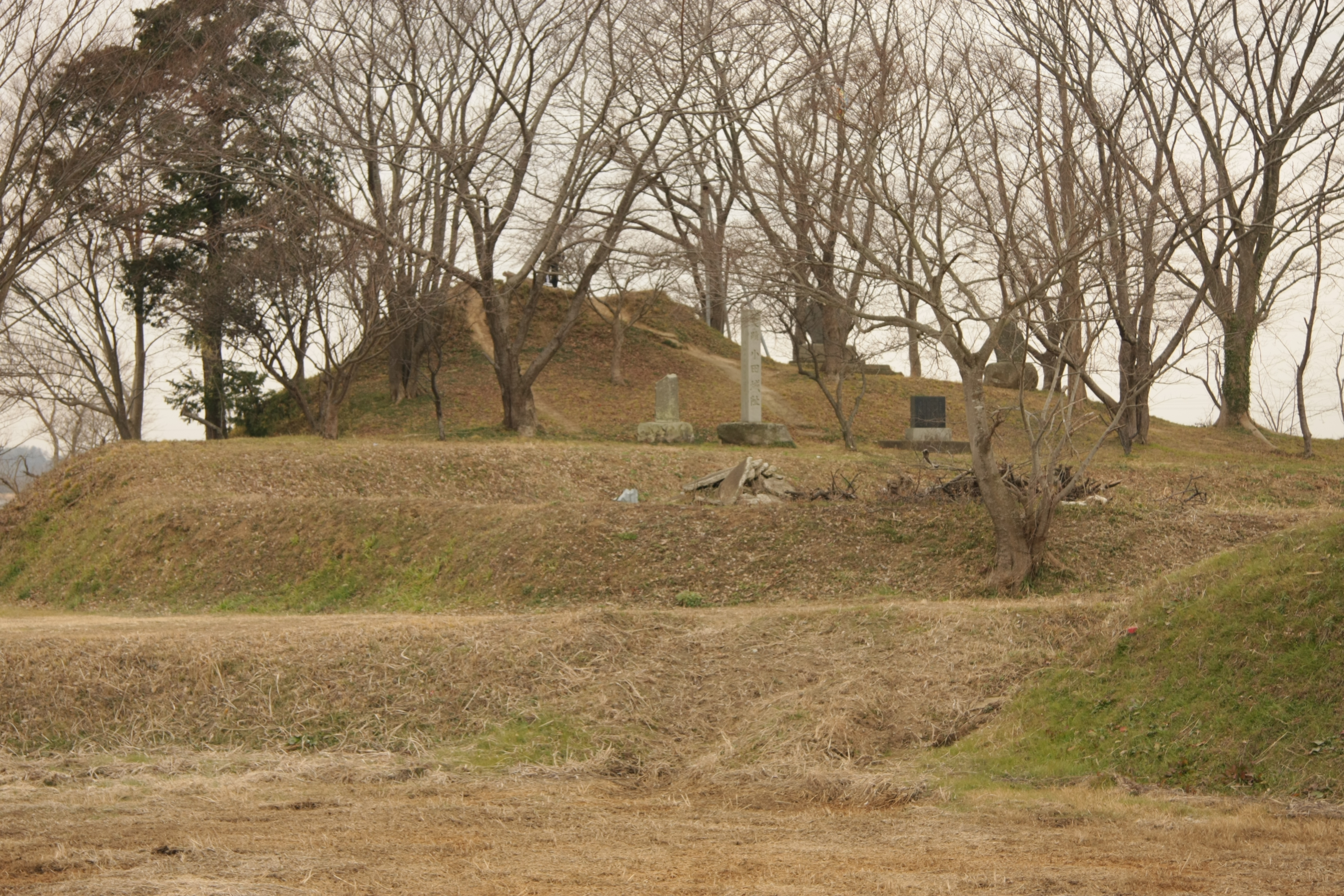
Yagura foundation

== See also ==
- List of Historic Sites of Japan (Ibaraki)

== Literature ==
- Schmorleitz, Morton S. (1974). Castles in Japan. Tokyo: Charles E. Tuttle Co. pp. 144–145. ISBN 0-8048-1102-4.
- Motoo, Hinago (1986). Japanese Castles. Tokyo: Kodansha. p. 200 pages. ISBN 0-87011-766-1.
- Mitchelhill, Jennifer (2004). Castles of the Samurai: Power and Beauty. Tokyo: Kodansha. p. 112 pages. ISBN 4-7700-2954-3.
- Turnbull, Stephen (2003). Japanese Castles 1540-1640. Osprey Publishing. p. 64 pages. ISBN 1-84176-429-9.
