= Tokuitsu =

Tokuitsu (徳一) (781?-842?) was a scholar-monk of East Asian Yogācāra in Japanese Buddhism. He is best known for his debates with other leading Buddhists of the time, Kūkai and Saichō, and for asserting a more orthodox Mahayana view based on the state-sanctioned schools of Nara.

== Biography ==
Little is known about Tokuitsu's early life, but records state that he studied East Asian Yogācāra doctrine at an early age at Kōfuku-ji, then later Tōdai-ji. His teacher is believed to be the eminent scholar Shūen (769-834). Saichō writes that Tokuitsu left the capital at age 20, and resided in the outer provinces in eastern Japan, apparently at the temples of Chūzen-ji in Tsukuba and Enichi-ji in Aizu. The bulk of his writings were concerned with challenging the Ekayana, Tiantai doctrines espoused by Saichō. Where Saichō advocated the notion of universal buddhahood in all beings, Tokuitsu countered with the orthodox Hossō view that buddhahood is not inherent in all beings, but can be awakened through the Dharma. In time, the debate grew heated, and insults were exchanged with Saichō criticizing Tokuitsu as "one who eats only coarse, meager food", an allusion to the Pratimokṣa monastic precepts, while Tokuitsu criticized the patriarch of Tendai Buddhism, Zhiyi, of being a "country rustic".

By contrast, Tokuitsu's correspondence with Kūkai was more cordial, but Tokuitsu's letters expressed great interest, persistent confusion, and doubt about Kūkai's teachings on the Dharmakāya. Kūkai, in deference to Tokuitsu's authority, adopted a more humble, conciliatory tone and sought to assert the validity of his esoteric-only teachings. Tokuitsu conceded some points to Kūkai's argument, but remained unconvinced otherwise.
