= Tōkai-ji =

Tōkai-ji may refer to:

== Places ==
- Tōkai-ji (Utsunomiya), a Shingon-shū Chisan-ha temple in Utsunomiya, Tochigi, noted for the Sanuki Stone Buddha
- Tōkai-ji (Chiba), a Shingon-shu Buzan-ha temple in Kashiwa, Chiba
- Tōkai-ji (Shinagawa), a Rinzai school Zen temple in Shinagawa, Tokyo associated with Takuan Sōhō
- Tōkai-ji (Kagawa), a Shingon temple in Higashikagawa, Kagawa
- Tōkai-ji (Tokushima), a Kōyasan Shingon-shū temple in Tokushima, Tokushima
