= Kogane Ichirizuka =

Koganei Ichirizuka
- 小金井一里塚 (Japanese)
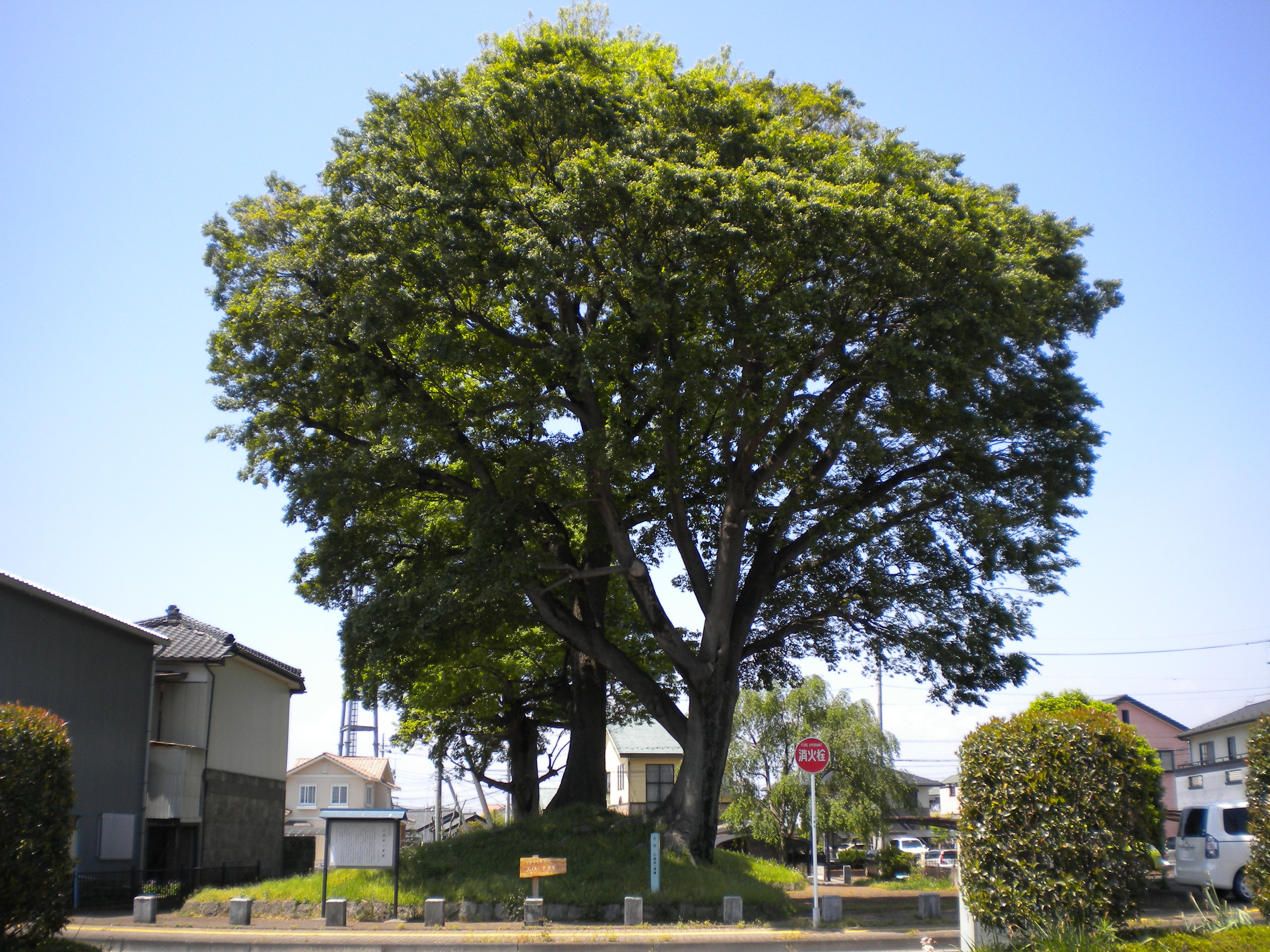
- Koganei Ichirizuka

- Koganei Ichirizuka Kogane Ichirizuka (Japan)
- 36°22′40″N 139°50′28″E
- Periods: Edo period
- Location: Shimotsuke, Tochigi, Japan
- Region: Kantō region

Site notes
- Public access: Yes

The Koganei Ichirizuka (小金井一里塚) is a historic Japanese distance marker akin to a milestone, comprising a pair of earthen mounds located in what is now part of the city of Shimotsuke, Tochigi Prefecture in the northern Kantō region of Japan. It was designated a National Historic Site of Japan in 1922.

== Overview ==
During the Edo period the Tokugawa shogunate established ichirizuka on major roads, enabling calculation both of distance travelled and of the charge for transportation by kago or palanquin. These mounds denoted the distance in ri (3.927 kilometres (2.440 mi)) to Nihonbashi, the "Bridge of Japan", erected in Edo in 1603. They were typically planted with an enoki or Japanese red pine to provide shelter for travelers. Since the Meiji period, most of the ichirizuka have disappeared, having been destroyed by the elements, modern highway construction and urban encroachment. In 1876, the "Ichirizuka Abolition decree" was issued by the Meiji government and many were demolished at that time. Currently, 17 surviving ichirizuka are designated as national historic sites.

In the case of the Koganei Ichirizuka, the mounds flank the Nikkō Kaidō (日光街道), and is 22 ri (approximately 88 kilometers) from Nihonbashi. The Nikkō Kaidō was one of the Edo Five Routes and it was built to connect Edo with the temple-shrine complex of Nikkō for pilgrimages by the Shōgun and major daimyō. The Koganei Ichirizuka is the only surviving pair of mounds on the Nikkō Kaidō. Each originally occupied a square that was nine meters on a side, but the Koganei Ichirizuka mounds have collapsed into a circular shape due to rain and exposure to the elements for centuries, and now have diameters of about 12 meters, with height of 2.7 meters. Due to the road renovation carried out in 1884, the main route of what was once the Nikkō Kaidō was relocated to the east, becoming Japan National Route 4. The original highway deteriorated into a village road, and thus this ichirizuka was spared from demolition.

Per an archaeological excavation conducted in 1997, the gravel of the original road and its gutters was uncovered, and a string of 50 pcs of mon coins from the Kan'ei era (1624-1649) was discovered.

The Koganei Ichirizuka is about 10 minutes on foot from Koganei Station on the JR East Tōhoku Main Line.

== See also ==
- List of Historic Sites of Japan (Tochigi)
