= List of places of scenic beauty of Japan (Tochigi) =

This list is of the places of scenic beauty of Japan located within the Prefecture of Tochigi.

== National Places of Scenic Beauty ==
As of 1 January 2021, three Places have been designated at a national level.

Site	Municipality	Comments	Image	Coordinates	Type	Ref.
Kegon Falls and Lake Chūzenji 華厳瀑および中宮祠湖（中禅寺湖）湖畔; Kegon-baku oyobi Chūgūshi-ko (Chūzenji-ko) ko-han	Nikkō			36°43′23″N 139°28′29″E	6, 7	
Ōya Rock Formations 大谷の奇岩群; Ōya no kigan-gun	Utsunomiya	designation includes Otome-yama (御止山) and Koshiji Iwa (越路岩); see also Ōya Stone		36°35′50″N 139°49′18″E	5	
Landscape of Oku no Hosomichi おくのほそ道の風景地; Oku no Hosomichi no fūkei-chi	Nasu, Nikkō, Ōtawara	designation spans twelve prefectures, including four component properties in Tochigi: Ganmanga-fuchi (Jiun-Ji Precinct) (ガンマンガ淵（慈雲寺境内）), Hachiman-gū (Nasu Jinja Precinct) (八幡宮（那須神社境内）), Sesshō-seki (殺生石), and Yugyō-yanagi (遊行柳（清水流るゝの柳）); Sesshō-seki is also a Prefectural Historic Site		37°05′59″N 140°00′02″E		

== Prefectural Places of Scenic Beauty ==
As of 1 May 2020, one Place has been designated at a prefectural level.

Site	Municipality	Comments	Image	Coordinates	Type	Ref.
Jōin-ji Precinct 行道山浄因寺境内; Gyōdō-san Jōinji keidai	Ashikaga			36°22′49″N 139°26′25″E		

== Municipal Places of Scenic Beauty ==
As of 1 May 2020, five Places have been designated at a municipal level.

Site	Municipality	Comments	Image	Coordinates	Type	Ref.
Ryūō-kyō 龍王峡; Ryūō-kyō	Nikkō			36°51′48″N 139°42′36″E		

== Registered Places of Scenic Beauty ==
As of 1 January 2021, four Monuments have been registered (as opposed to designated) as Places of Scenic Beauty at a national level.

Place	Municipality	Comments	Image	Coordinates	Type	Ref.
Utsunomiya University Gardens 宇都宮大学庭園; Utsunomiya daigaku teien	Utsunomiya			36°33′19″N 139°52′57″E		
Ganga-en 巖華園; Ganga-en	Ashikaga			36°21′41″N 139°27′52″E		
Shindō Family Gardens 新藤氏庭園; Shindō-shi teien	Ashikaga			36°21′07″N 139°24′42″E		
Butsugaiken Gardens 物外軒庭園; Butsugaiken teien	Ashikaga			36°20′21″N 139°26′29″E		

== See also ==
- Cultural Properties of Japan
- List of parks and gardens of Tochigi Prefecture
- List of Historic Sites of Japan (Tochigi)
