= Fujimoto Kannonyama Kofun =

- 藤本観音山古墳 (Japanese)
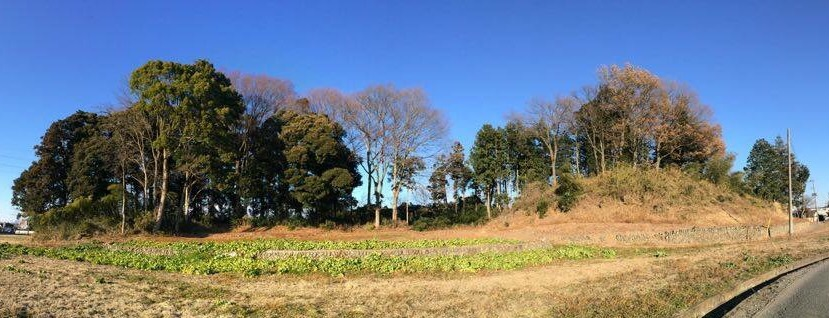
- Fujimoto Kannonyama Kofun

- Fujimoto Kannonyama Kofun Fujimoto Kannonyama Kofun (Japan)
- 36°18′2.8″N 139°26′12.3″E
- Type: kofun
- Periods: Kofun period
- Location: Ashikaga, Tochigi, Japan
- Region: Kantō region

History
- Built: late 4th century AD

Site notes
- Public access: Yes

The Fujimoto Kannonyama Kofun (藤本観音山古墳) is a "two conjoined rectangles" shaped (前方後方墳, zenpō-kōhō-fun) kofun burial mound located in the city of Ashikaga in Tochigi Prefecture in the northern Kantō region of Japan. It received protection as a National Historic Site in 2006.

== Overview ==
The Fujimoto Kannonyama Kofun is located in the Fujimoto neighborhood of Ashikaga City surrounded by rice fields, in the northern end of the Kantō Plain near the border with Gunma Prefecture. It is located on a plateau on the right bank of the Yaba River. The surrounding area has numerous smaller kofun and was densely settled in the ancient period.

The tumulus has a total length of 117.8 meters, and consists of a front part with two tiers and a height of 5.4 meters, and a back part with three tiers and a height of 11.8 meters. In the rear part, fukiishi covered the third tier, and although no haniwa were found, a clay pot with a double rim was placed on top of the mound. The tumulus was surrounded by a moat, and including the dimensions of the moat, the total length exceeds 210 meters. This is the fifth largest zenpō-kōhō-fun in Japan, and the third largest in eastern Japan. It dates from the middle of the 4th century, based on a pumice layer from a 4th century eruption of Mount Asama which was found in the topsoil beneath the tumulus.

The tumulus has not been excavated and the burial chamber appears to be intact, as no trace of digging has been detected. The first excavation survey was carried out in 1984, and further surveys were conducted for seven times by 2003. On the south side of tumulus, the remains of 21 pit dwellings and three storage pits dating from the same time as the kofun have been discovered. It is believed that this was a settlement either related to the construction of the tumulus, or connected to rituals associated with the kofun after its completion.

The kofun is located approximately a 30 minute walk from Fukui Station on the Tobu Isesaki Line.

== See also ==
- List of Historic Sites of Japan (Tochigi)
