= Nishikata Castle =

- 西方城
- Tochigi, Tochigi Prefecture, Japan
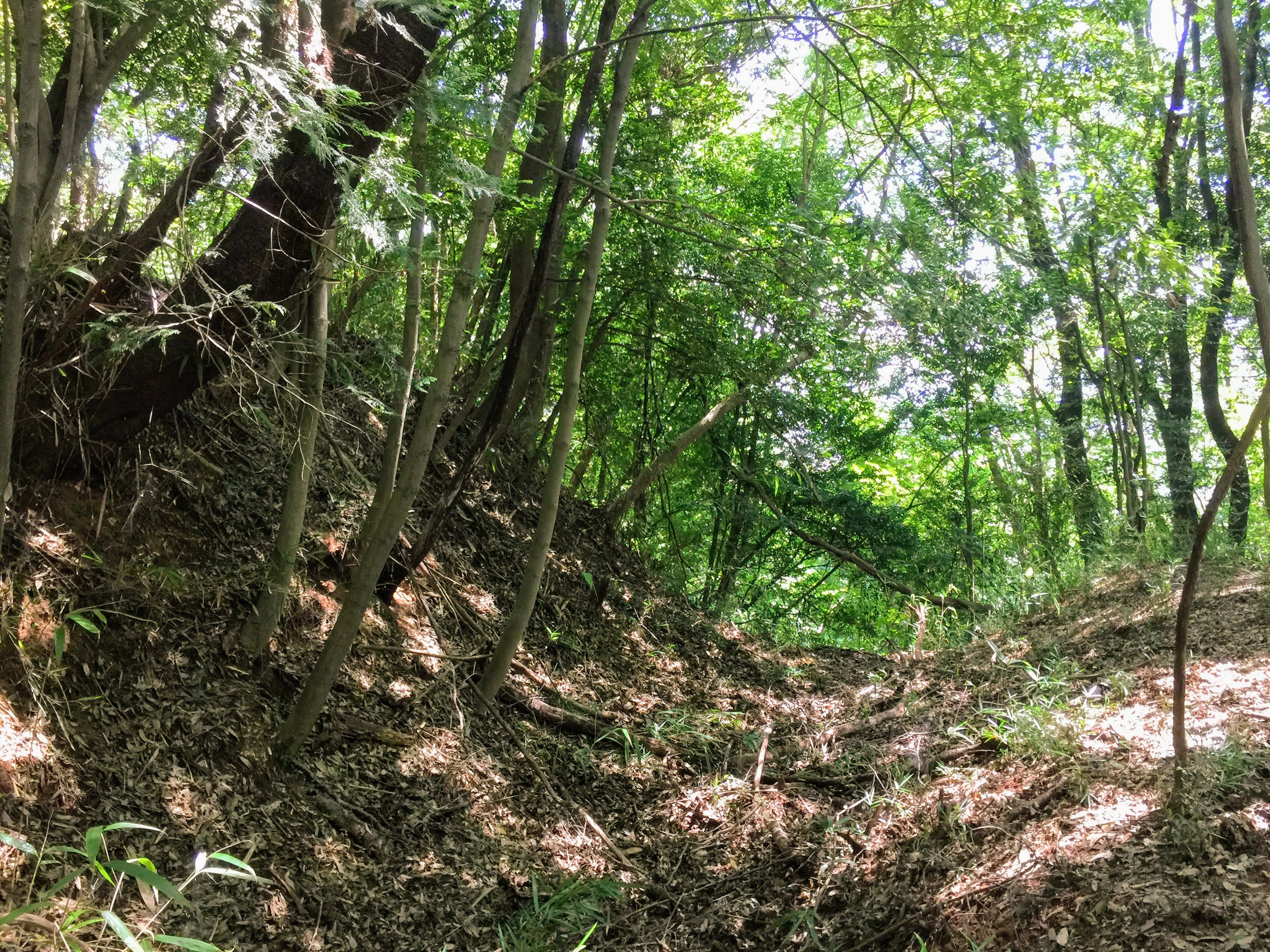
- ruins of Nishikata Castle

Site information
- Type: yamajiro-style Japanese castle
- Open to the public: yes
- Condition: Ruins

Location
- Location within Tochigi Prefecture Location within Japan
- Coordinates: 36°28′25″N 139°43′12″E

Site history
- Built: 1293
- Built by: Utsunomiya clan
- In use: Sengoku period
- Demolished: 1615
- National Historic Site of Japan

Nishikata Castle (西方城, Nishikata-jō) was a yamajiro-style Japanese castle located in the Nishikatahonjō neighborhood of the city of Tochigi, Tochigi Prefecture, in the southern Tōhoku region of Japan. The ruins were designated a National Historic Site in 2022.

== Overview ==
Nishikata Castle was built from the eastern foot to the summit of the 221.3-meter Mount Shiroyama at the eastern end of the Ashio Mountains. It comprises eight enclosures, separated north and south by earthworks, moats, and earthen bridges. The history of the castle is uncertain, but it is believed to have been built on the Kamakura period in 1293 by Utsunomiya Kageyasu, who took the name "Nishikata" from the local place name. During the tenure of Nishikata Tsunayoshi, Toyotomi Hideyoshi attacked the Odawara Hōjō clan at the Siege of Odawara (1590). Tsunayoshi, who refused the summons the pledge fealty to Hideyoshi, had his territory confiscated. The former Nishikata territory was given to Yūki Hideyasu. However, after the Battle of Sekigahara in 1600, the Yūki clan was transferred to Echizen Province, and the former Nishikata lands were given to Fujita Nobuyoshi (becoming the 15,000 koku Nishikata Domain). Fujita Nobuyoshi constructed a new castle, commonly known as "Nijō Castle," at an elevation of about 150 meters on the southeast side of the Nishikata Castle ruins. However, the domain was short-lived. Fujita Nobuyoshi was demoted after the Siege of Osaka (1615). Various reasons were cited for his demotion, including a blunder while serving as a military inspector, or a gaffe resulting from dissatisfaction with his military achievements, but in any event his domain was abolished and he died the same year. Nishikata Castle was abandoned at that time.

The main enclosures are lined up on the north-south hill ridges at the summit, while the foothills are made up of a group of enclosures centered around a square enclosure. Excavations have uncovered traces of pillars, but whether buildings were ever erected there remains to be verified. It is possible to infer the history of the castle itself, with the summit being the site during the Nishikata clan's period, both the summit and foothills during the Yūki clan's period, and the eastern foothills during the Fujita clan's period. The role of the castle also changed greatly over time; during the time of the Nishikata clan, it was an enclave of the Utsunomiya domain and a boundary castle against the Odawara Hōjō clan, and during the time of the Yūki clan, it was the northern limit of the Tokugawa domain and came to have a stronger meaning as a boundary against the Uesugi clan.

The castle ruins remain largely intact, except for a portion of its eastern side, which has been cut away by the Tohoku Expressway. The main bailey in the center has high walls, with some stone walls remaining. A tower base also remains in the northwest corner. A huge double moat (or possibly triple moat, including the lower moat surrounding the main castle) has been dug along the western ridge, blocking off the area.

The castle site is approximately 14 kilometers north of Tochigi Station on the JR East Ryōmō Line.

== See also ==
- List of Historic Sites of Japan (Tochigi)

== Literature ==
- Schmorleitz, Morton S. (1974). Castles in Japan. Tokyo: Charles E. Tuttle Co. pp. 144–145. ISBN 0-8048-1102-4.
- Motoo, Hinago (1986). Japanese Castles. Tokyo: Kodansha. p. 200 pages. ISBN 0-87011-766-1.
- Turnbull, Stephen (2003). Japanese Castles 1540-1640. Osprey Publishing. p. 64 pages. ISBN 1-84176-429-9.
