= Teranohigashi Site =

Archaeological site in Oyama, Japan

- 寺野東遺跡 (Japanese)
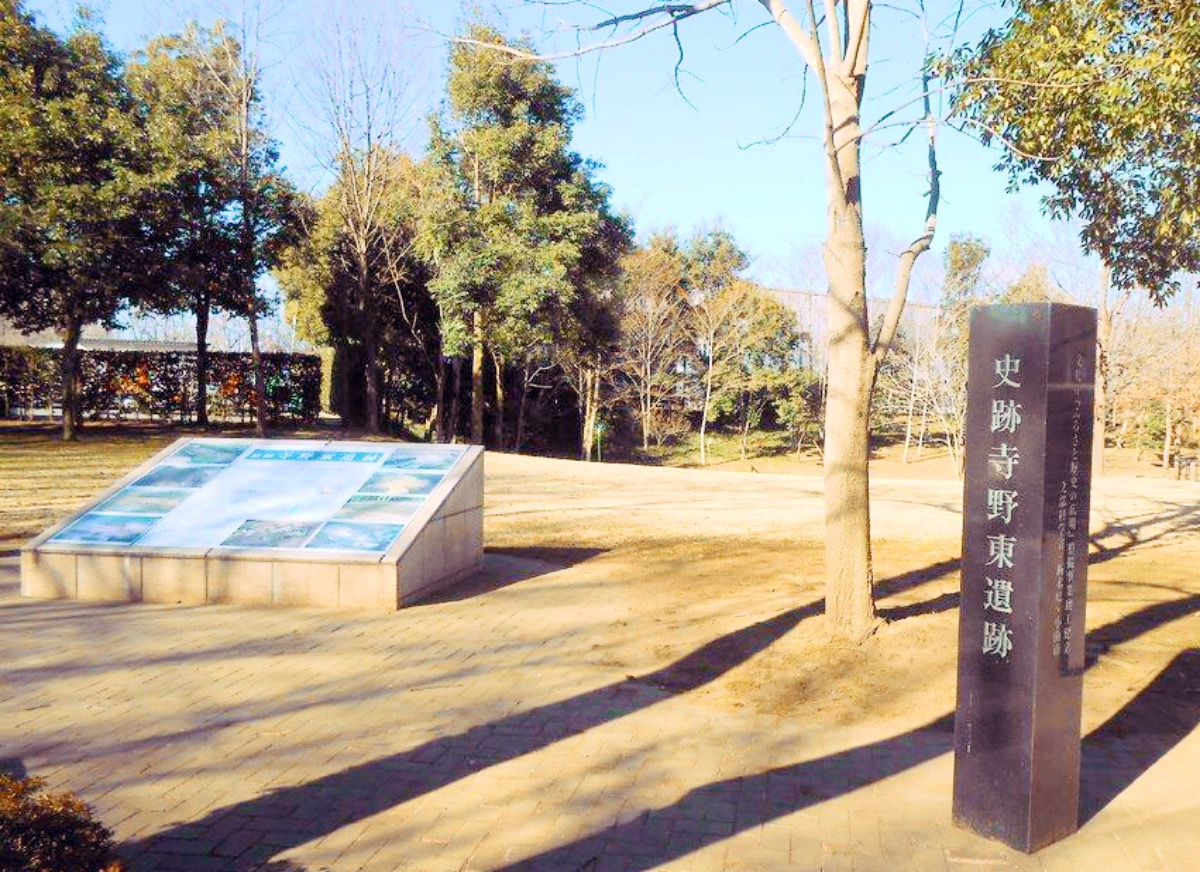
- Teranohigashi ruins

- Teranohigashi ruins Teranohigashi Site (Japan)
- 36°19′36″N 139°52′52″E
- Type: settlement
- Periods: Jōmon period
- Location: Oyama, Tochigi, Japan
- Region: Kantō region

Site notes
- Excavation dates: 1990
- Public access: Yes (archaeological park)

The Teranohigashi Site (寺野東遺跡, Teranohigashi iseki) is a complex archaeological site in the city of Oyama, Tochigi Prefecture, in the northern Kantō region of Japan. The site was designated a National Historic Site in 1995 by the Japanese government.

== Overview ==
The site is located approximately 43 meters above sea level at the eastern end of the Takaragi Plateau, which extends north to south on the right bank of the Tagawa River. The eastern side of the plateau is eroded by the Tagawa and Kinugawa rivers, with Mount Tsukuba to the southeast, Mount Shirane and Mount Akagi in the northwest, and Mount Kogen in the north. It is located about 7 kilometers east-northeast from Oyama city.

The site was discovered and partially excavated from 1990 to 1994 in conjunction with the development of an industrial park. Stone tools belonging to the late Japanese Paleolithic era were found at four locations, and the ruins of the middle to late Jōmon period (4600 to 4300 years ago) settlement with 74 pit dwellings, the ruins an early Kofun period burial mound and settlement, and traces of occupation in the Nara period and Heian period were found.

Of especial note was the discovery of a massive semi-circular ring embankment shaped like a donut with a diameter of about 165 meters north–south and embankment width of 15 to 20 meters, and a height of about two meters at its highest point. The embankment contained four layers of the red fired soil alternating with normal soil, indicating that the embankment was formed by repeated burning and compacting over many years. It is presumed that it was a ritual site in the Jōmon period rather than a defensive structure. It was constructed approximately 3800 years ago and maintained for at least 1000 years. Much of the eastern half has disappeared due to erosion, but four large sections remain.

A wide variety of artifacts, including earthenware, clay figurines, stone weights, and stone swords have been found. This site was designated as a National Historic Site as it provides valuable materials for studying the settlements, social structures, lifestyles and transitions over several thousand years of continual settlement. In 2004, the site was opened as an archaeological park named "Oyama Jōmon Festival Square". It is located about 5 minutes by car from Yūki Station on the JR East Mito Line.

== See also ==
- List of Historic Sites of Japan (Tochigi)
