= Chausuyama Kofun (Mibu) =

Historic burial ground

- 茶臼山古墳 (Japanese)
- Chausuyama Kofun Chausuyama Kofun (Mibu) (Japan)
- 36°29′22.1″N 139°46′41.2″E
- Type: kofun
- Periods: Kofun period
- Location: Mibu, Tochigi, Japan
- Region: Kantō region

History
- Built: late 6th century AD

Site notes
- Public access: Yes (no public facilities)

The Chausuyama Kofun (茶臼山古墳) is a Kofun period burial mound located in the town of Mibu, Shimotsuga District, Tochigi Prefecture in the northern Kantō region of Japan. It received protection as a National Historic Site in 1958. It is also sometimes referred to as the Hanyu Chausuyama Kofun (羽生田茶臼山古墳) to distinguish it from many other kofun named "Chausuyama" all over Japan.

== Overview ==
The Chausuyama Kofun is a zenpō-kōen-fun (前方後円墳), which is shaped like a keyhole, having one square end and one circular end, when viewed from above. It is located at an elevation of about 100 meters above sea level in former Hanyu Village, on the left bank of the Kurokawa River, surrounded by a golf course to the north and east. Te surrounding area contains several other large tumuli from the same time period. The Chausuyama Kofun has an overall length of 91 meters, height of 12 meters, and was built in two-tiers. It was once encircled by a moat. Fragments of haniwa were discovered on top of the burial mound, which when reconstructed proved to be a very large (180 cm) model of a house. Fragments of other haniwa and Sue ware pottery were also discovered during an excavation conducted in 1895; however, the interior of the tumulus has not been excavated. From the shape of the tumulus and the types of haniwa, the tumulus is believed to date from the second half of the 6th century AD.

The kofun is located about 25 minutes by car from Mibu Station on the Tōbu Railway Utsunomiya Line.

== See also ==
- List of Historic Sites of Japan (Tochigi)
