= Ōya-ji =

Buddhist temple in Tochigi Prefecture, Japan

Ōya-dera
- 大谷寺
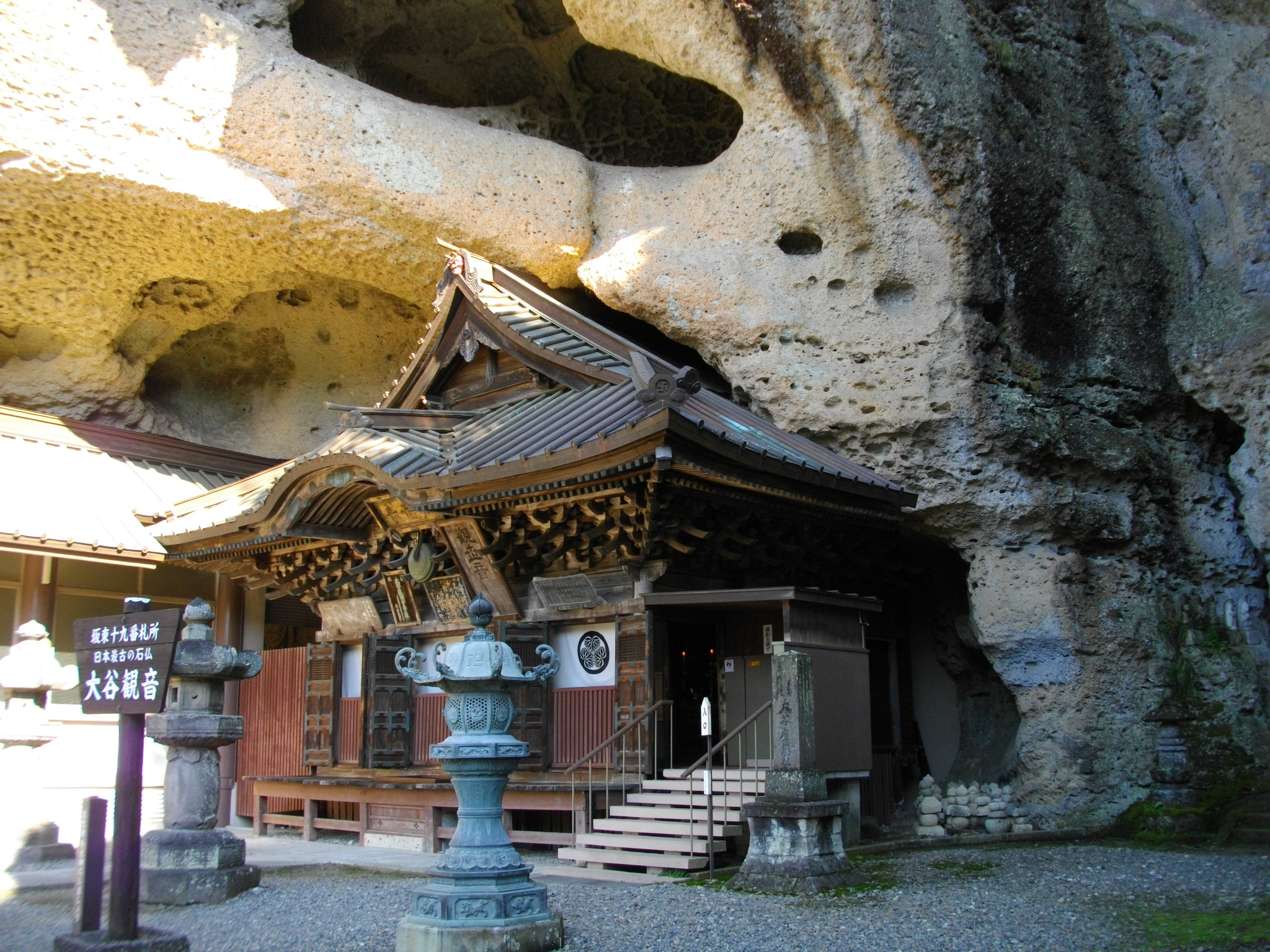
- Ōya-dera Kannon-do

- Location within Tochigi Prefecture Location within Japan

Religion
- Affiliation: Buddhist
- Deity: Senjū Kannon Bosatsu ( Sahasrabhūja)
- Rite: Tendai
- Status: functional

Location
- Location: 1198 Ōya-machi, Utsunomiya-shi, Tochigi-ken
- Country: Japan
- Coordinates: 36°35′47″N 139°49′15″E

Architecture
- Founder: Kūkai
- Completed: c.810 AD

Website
- Official website
- } Special National Historic Site of Japan National Important Cultural Property

Ōya-dera (大谷寺) is a Buddhist temple located in the city of Utsunomiya, Tochigi Prefecture, in northern Kantō region of Japan. The temple is famous for its bas-relief carvings on a cliff face. It belongs to the Tendai sect and its honzon is a statue of Senjū Kannon Bosatsu (Sahasrabhūja). The temple's full name is Tenkai-zan Jodo-in Ōya-ji (天開山 浄土院 大谷寺).The temple is the 19th stop on the Bandō Sanjūsankasho pilgrimage route.

== History ==
The history and foundation of the temple is uncertain, but it appears to date from the late Nara period to early Heian period. The temple is located in a valley which contains the ruins of a Jōmon period settlement. According to the temple's own legend, it was founded by Kūkai in 810 AD after he returned from Tang dynasty China. The honzon image of Senjū Kannon Bosatsu is approximately 4.5 meters tall and was completed before the end of the Heian period. The temple became part of the Bandō Sanjūsankasho route in the Kamakura period. It was under the protection of the powerful Utsunomiya Futaarayama Jinja and the Utsunomiya clan through the Muromachi period. The temple went into decline after the destruction of the Utsunomiya clan by Toyotomi Hideyoshi, but was revived under the sponsorship of the Okudaira clan, who became daimyō of Utsunomiya Domain in the early Edo period. The temple was rebuilt by Kamehime, the eldest daughter of Shōgun Tokugawa Ieyasu, with the assistance of Tenkai as a resting place between Edo and the Shrines and Temples of Nikkō. The temple has burned down on several occasions, and most of its documentary history has been lost. Its precincts were excavated in 1965, and Buddha statues from the Kamakura period, votive stones dated 1363, and a copper bowl dated 1551 were found.

The temple complex also includes a small museum. Across from the temple is an Ōya stone quarry that has been converted into a park. The park features a massive statue of Kannon, called the "Kannon of Peace" (平和観音, Heiwa Kannon) created after World War II.

The temple is approximately 30 minutes by car from JR East Utsunomiya Station.

== Cultural Properties ==
=== Special National Historic Site ===
- The Ōya Stone Buddhas (大谷磨崖仏, Ōya magaibutsu) is a set of ten bas-relief carvings of various Buddhist divinities located on a cliff at Ōya-dera. These carvings were designated a National Historic Site of Japan in 1926 and reclassified as a Special National Historic Site in 1954.

The carvings are located on the wall of a large natural cave on the southwestern side of a hill made of Ōya stone called Otomeyama. The wall is divided into four large and small quadrants. In the first quadrant, facing west, is a statue of Senjū Kannon with a height of four meters. This is the honzon image of the temple. According to temple legend, the statue was carved by Kūkai himself, and was once covered by lacquer and gold leaf. In the second quadrant is a sitting image of Shaka Nyōrai with a height of 3.5 meters, flanked to the left and right by Monju Bosatsu and Fugen Bostasu. The statue in the third quadrant a sitting Yakushi Nyōrai with a height of 1.2 meters, flanked by Nikkō Bosatsu and Gakkō Bosatsu. The fourth quadrant is believed to be a seated Amida Nyōrai with a height of 2.6 meters, flanked by status of Kannon Bosatsu and Seishi Bosatsu. In addition, several sitting images depicted on the wall on the right side of the Kannon statue, and a statue of a Buddha above. The statues of Senjū Kannon and Yakushi Nyōrai are believed to date from the early Heian period, with the statue of Shaka Nyōrai from the late Heian period, and the remaining statues from the late Heian to early Kamakura period.

These statues are regarded as having extremely high artistic and academic value, along with the more famous Usuki Stone Buddhas in Oita Prefecture, and the carvings were also designated an Important Cultural Property of Japan in 1986.

=== Tochigi Prefecture Tangible Cultural Properties ===
- Bronze Bell (銅鐘), Edo period. This bronze bonshō was cast in 1710.

=== Utsunomiya City Tangible Cultural Properties ===
- Bronze Waniguchi (銅製鰐口), Edo period. A waniguchi is a bronze gong that is hung under the eaves of the front of shrines and temples, and is sounded by worshipers pulling a thick rope woven from cloth. This bronze example was made in 1667.
- Bronze Lantern (銅製灯篭), Edo period. This octagonal bronze tōrō lantern was donated in 1716.

== See also ==
- List of Historic Sites of Japan (Tochigi)
