= Kabasaki-ji =

Buddhist temple in Ashikaga, Japan

- 樺崎寺
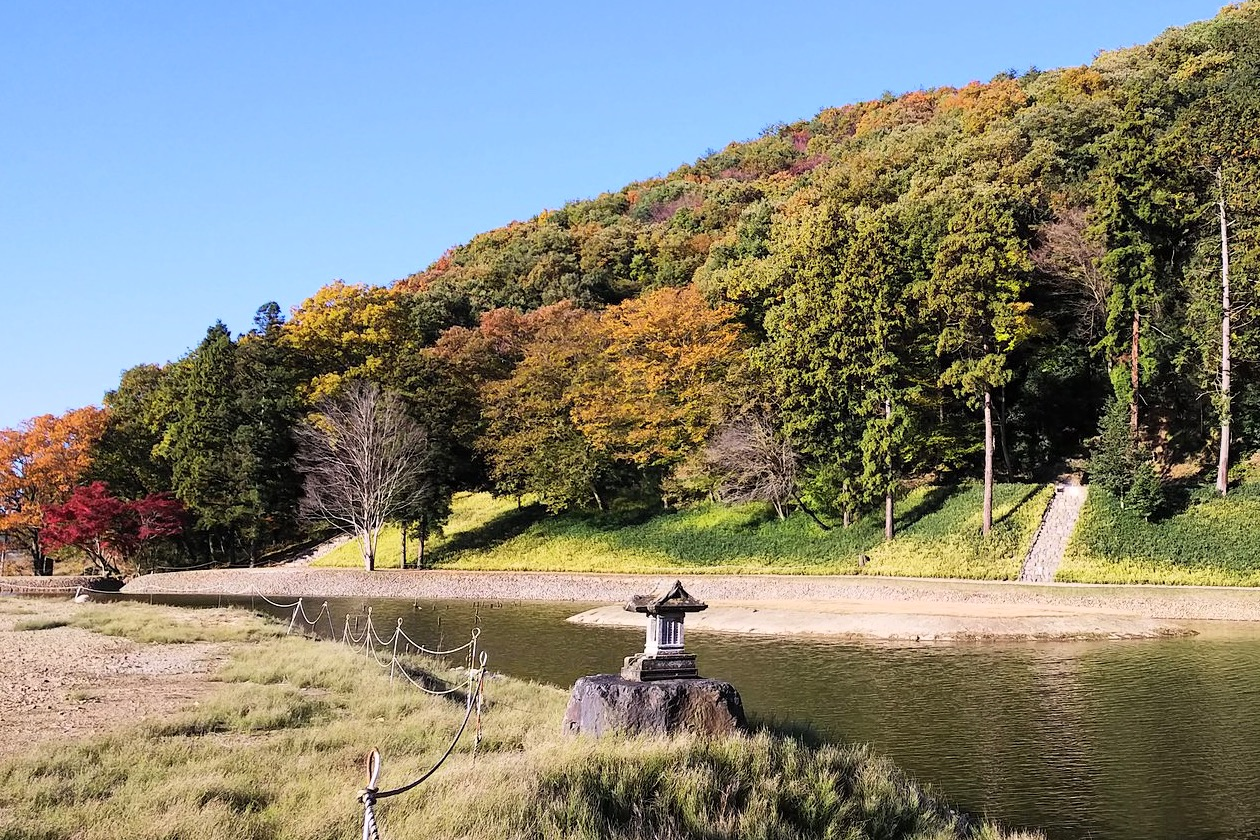
- Kabasaki-ji

- Location within Tochigi Prefecture Location within Japan

Religion
- Affiliation: Buddhist
- Status: ruins

Location
- Location: Ashikaga-shi, Tochigi-ken
- Country: Japan
- Interactive map of Kabasaki-ji
- Coordinates: 36°21′41″N 139°29′39″E

Architecture
- Founder: Ashikaga Yoshikane
- Completed: 1189 AD

Kabasaki-ji (樺崎寺) was a Buddhist temple located in what is now the city of Ashikaga, Tochigi Prefecture, in northern Kantō region of Japan. It is noted for its connections to the Ashikaga clan, who ruled Japan during the Muromachi period. The temple is now an archaeological site and has been designated by the national government as a National Historic Site since 2001.

== History ==
Kabasaki-ji was located in a valley along the Kabasaki River, about 4.5 kilometers northeast of the remains of the Ashikaga residence (Banna-ji). It was constructed by Ashikaga Yoshikane in the early Kamakura period to pray for victory over the Northern Fujiwara during Minamoto no Yoritomo's campaign against the forces of Hiraizumi in 1189. In 1195, Ashikaga Yoshikane became a Buddhist monk at this temple, where he died in 1198. The temple thereafter became his memorial temple and bodaiji for the Ashikaga clan. However, by the Sengoku period, the power and influence of the Ashikaga clan had waned, and the temple fell into near ruin. It was maintained in the Edo period by the Kitsuregawa clan, who claimed descent from the Ashikaga, and a Hachiman shrine was built in its precincts. With the post-Meiji restoration haibutsu kishaku movement, the remnants of the Buddhist temple were destroyed, and only the Shinto shrine remained.

Excavations have been carried out continuously since 1984. The foundations of the main buildings are in good condition, and there are remains of a "Pure Land" style Jōdo garden with a large pond, and using the borrowed scenery of nearby Mount Yawata. Numerous ceramic shards and fragments of wood with inscriptions have been found. The traces of Ashikaga Yoshikane's mausoleum and the layout of the buildings matches what is described in contemporary documents. The temple area measures approximately 200 meters square. It is located 15 minutes by car from Ashikaga Station on the JR East Ryōmō Line.

In 2024, 200 copper sheets used as roofing for the Shinto shrine were stolen.

== See also ==
- List of Historic Sites of Japan (Tochigi)
