= Shimotsuke Provincial Capital =

Shimotsuke Provincial Capital ruins
- 下野国庁跡 (Japanese)
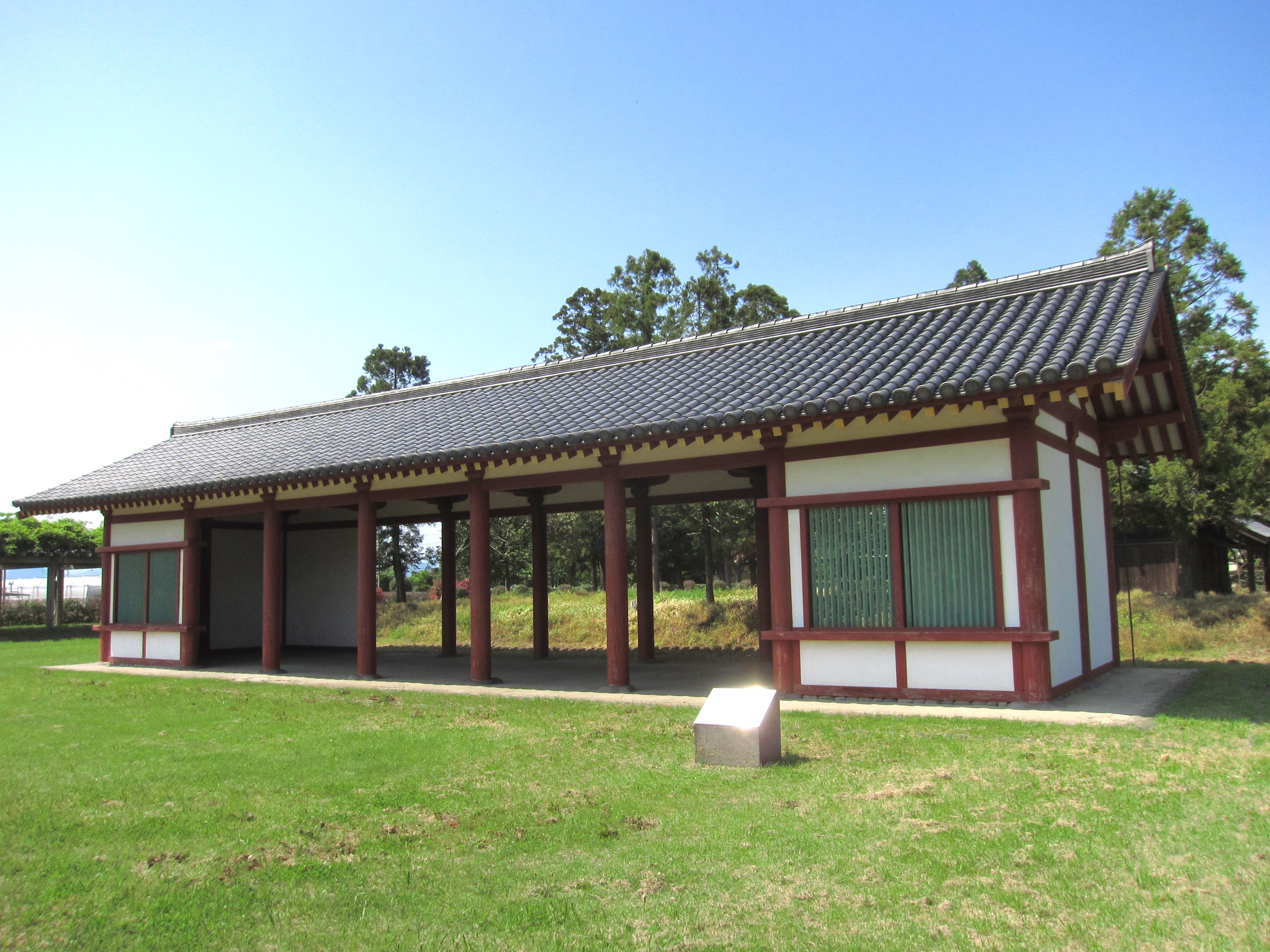
- reconstructed building at the Shimotsuke Provincial Capital ruins

- Shimotsuke Provincial Capital ruins Shimotsuke Provincial Capital (Japan)
- 36°22′47.5″N 139°47′6.3″E
- Periods: Nara - Heian period
- Location: Tochigi, Tochigi, Japan
- Region: Kantō region

History
- Built: 729 AD

Site notes
- Public access: Yes (museum on site)

The Shimotsuke Provincial Capital ruins (下野国庁跡, Shimotsuke kokuchō ato) is an archaeological site with the ruins of a Nara to Heian period government administrative complex located in what is now part of the city of Tochigi, Tochigi prefecture in the northern Kantō region of Japan. Identified as the ruins of the kokufu (provincial capital) of Shimotsuke Province, the site is protected by the national government as a National Historic Site from 1982.

== Overview ==
In the late Nara period, after the establishment of a centralized government under the Ritsuryō system, local rule over the provinces was standardized under a kokufu (provincial capital), and each province was divided into smaller administrative districts, known as (郡, gun, kōri), composed of 2–20 townships in 715 AD. The kokufu complex contained the official residence and offices of the kokushi, the official sent from the central government as provincial governor, along with buildings housing offices concerned with general administration, farming, finance, police and military. In the periphery there was a provincial school (kokugaku), the garrison and storehouses for taxes.

The Shimotsuke Provincial Capital ruins are located in the precincts of Miyanobe Shrine, in the countryside on the right bank of a river running along the eastern edge of the city of Tochigi. An excavation survey conducted from 1976 to 1979 confirmed that layout of structures corresponded to that of the semi-standardized format for a government office complex and dated the site to 729 AD in the Nara period. The location also corresponds to the one given in the Wamyō Ruijushō from 935 AD, which contains the earliest surviving listing of the capitals of the provinces and their location. The foundation stones for various buildings were in good preservation. The site was a square area measuring one chō on each side (approximately 110 meters), surrounded by a wooden palisade. In the center was an administrative building, with a large main hall behind it. Side halls flanked these buildings to the east and west. The complex had a gate in each of the cardinal directions, with the main gate to the south. A road nine-meters in width led from the south gate to the center of the administrative complex.

The structures were rebuilt in roughly four periods. The initial construction burned down around 780 AD, and again in 791 AD. The third construction was destroyed in the 9th century and the final construction fell into ruins around the beginning of the 10th century. Most of the site is still unexcavated, and it is believed that the ruins of a settlement which surrounded the provincial capital extend for several hundred meters in all directions. One of the buildings in the administrative complex, a 7 x 2 bay building measuring 22 meters by 4.8 meters, has been reconstructed and the site is open to the public as an archaeological park. Excavated artifacts, including wooden blocks with various inscriptions, lacquerware, and ceramic shards, are exhibited at a museum on site and at the Prefectural Museum in Utsunomiya.

The site is located about 10 minutes by car from Tochigi Station on the JR East Ryōmō Line.

== See also ==
- List of Historic Sites of Japan (Tochigi)
