= Negoyadai Site =

Archaeological site in Japan

Coordinates: 36°32′6″N 139°49′59″E

- 根古谷台遺跡 (Japanese)
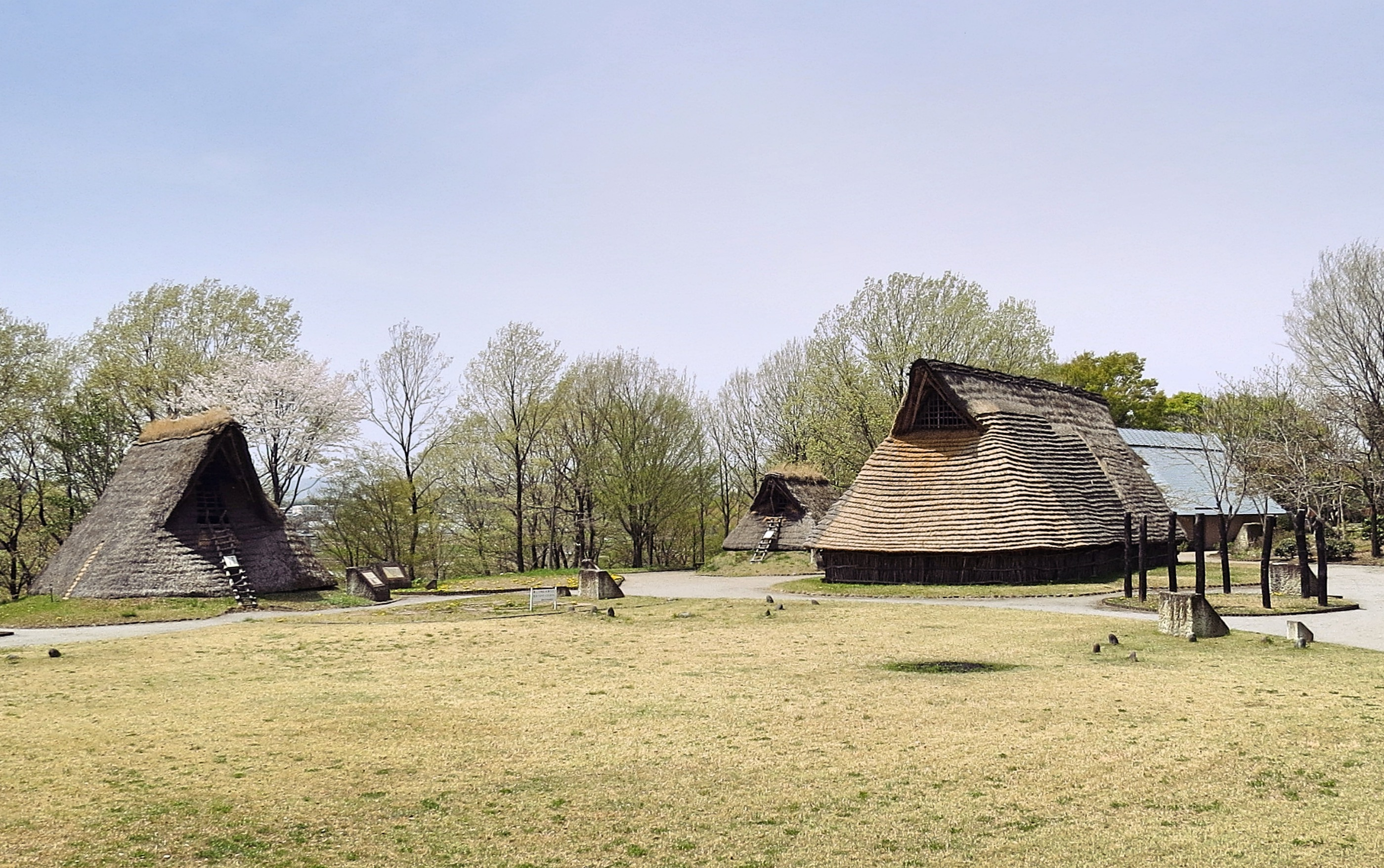
- reconstructed pit dwellings at Negoyadai ruins

- Location within Tochigi Prefecture Location within Japan
- Type: settlement, necropolis
- Periods: Jōmon period
- Location: Utsunomiya, Tochigi, Japan
- Region: Kantō region

Site notes
- Excavation dates: 1982-1986
- Public access: Yes (archaeological park)

The Negoyadai Site (根古谷台遺跡, Negoyadai iseki) is an archaeological site in the city of Utsunomiya, Tochigi Prefecture, in the northern Kantō region of Japan with a Jōmon period settlement trace and necropolis. The site was designated a National Historic Site in 1988 by the Japanese government. It is also referred to as the Seizankōen isseki (聖山公園遺跡).

== Overview ==
The Negoyadai Site is located in the Kamikake neighborhood of Utsunomiya, on the right fluvial terrace of the Sugatagawa River, and was discovered during the construction of the modern Utsunomiya Municipal Cemetery. Per excavations carried out from 1982 to 1988, and the remains of pit dwellings, square pillar buildings, and more than 339 grave pits were discovered. The grave pits were grouped in clusters of five to ten pits per group, and are arranged so as to surround a central plaza. Each grave is around one meter in diameter, with a depth of 50-60 centimetres. Several of the pit dwellings were unusually large, over eight meters long and with several hearths, indicating that more than one family unit resided in the same building. Likewise, some of the rectangular raised-floor buildings were unusually large, with a length of 14 to 24 meters. As the size of the necropolis is far larger than the number of buildings would normally indicate, it is assumed that this was more of a ritual site rather than a settlement location.

The grave goods excavated from the grave pits included stone earrings, cylindrical beads, and stone implements. These artifacts were collectively designated as an Important Cultural Property of Japan in 1990.

As a result of the National Historic Site designation, the city of Utsunomiya City has reduced the size of the cemetery and has maintained the area around the ruins as park with four reconstructions of pit dwellings. It is located about 30 minutes by car from Utsunomiya Station on the Tōhoku Shinkansen.

== See also ==
- List of Historic Sites of Japan (Tochigi)
