= Chōjagadaira Kanga ruins =

Archaeological site in Nakagawa, Japan

- 長者ヶ平官衙遺跡 (Japanese)
- Chōjagadaira Kanga ruins Chōjagadaira Kanga ruins (Japan)
- 36°40′53″N 140°02′45″E
- Periods: Nara - Heian period
- Location: Nakagawa, Tochigi, Japan
- Region: Tōhoku region

History
- Built: 8th century AD
- Abandoned: 10th century AD

Site notes
- Public access: No (no public facilities)

The Chōjagadaira Kanga ruins (長者ヶ平官衙遺跡, Chōjagadaira kanga iseki) is an archaeological site with the ruins of a Nara to Heian period government administrative complex located in what is now on the border of the cities of Nasukarasuyama, and Sakura in Tochigi prefecture in the northern Kantō region of Japan. It is protected by the central government as a National Historic Site from 2009.

== Overview ==
In the late Nara period, after the establishment of a centralized government under the Ritsuryō system, local rule over the provinces was standardized under a kokufu (provincial capital), and each province was divided into smaller administrative districts, known as (郡, gun, kōri), composed of 2–20 townships in 715 AD.

The Chōjagadaira Kanga ruins are located on the Kitsuregawa hills near the Ara River of the Naka River system that flows southeast in the eastern part of Tochigi Prefecture. The ruins are also on the ancient Tōsandō highway which connected central and northern Japan with the Kansai area. A small 10-meter wide fragment of the original highway survives and is also included in the National Historic Site designation. The government administrative complex ruins were discovered during an archaeological excavation from 2001 to 2005, and consist of the remnants of a rectangular enclosure, approximately 350 meters east–west by 220 meters north–south, with remnants of a moat and earthen rampart, presumably surmounted by a wooden palisade. Inside the enclosure, the elevated foundation base of a large building and the foundation pillars for many warehouse structures for storing tax rice were discovered. This arrangement was common to Nara period and Heian period county administrative complexes in other parts of the country. The site appears to have been occupied from the eighth through the end of the tenth centuries.

It is uncertain when the complex was abandoned, but per local legend, the site as the fortified home of a rich magnate (chōja) that was burned down by Minamoto no Yoshiie on his way back from either the Zenkunen War or the Later Three Years' War.

The ruins were backfilled after excavation, and are now an empty field. The site is located about six minutes by car from Ogane Station on the JR East Karasuyama Line.

== See also ==
- List of Historic Sites of Japan (Tochigi)
