= List of historic sites of Japan (Tochigi) =

This list is of the historic sites of Japan located within the Prefecture of Tochigi.

== National Historic Sites ==
As of 24 June 2024, thirty-nine Sites have been designated as being of national significance (including two *Special Historic Sites).

Site	Municipality	Comments	Image	Coordinates	Type	Ref.
*Ōya Stone Buddhas 大谷磨崖仏 Ōya magaibutsu	Utsunomiya	Heian/Kamakura period bas-relief carvings	Ōya Stone Buddhas	36°35′47″N 139°49′15″E	3	470
*Nikkō Cedar Avenue 日光杉並木街道 附 並木寄進碑 Nikkō sugi namiki kaidō tsuketari namiki kishin hi	Nikkō, Kanuma	designation includes an associated monument; also a Special Natural Monument	Nikkō Cedar Avenue	36°44′41″N 139°42′24″E	6	467
Atagozuka Kofun 愛宕塚古墳 Atagozuka kofun	Mibu	Kofun period tumulus	Atagozuka Kofun	36°25′58″N 139°48′36″E	1	473
Otomefudōhara Tile Kiln ruins 乙女不動原瓦窯跡 Otomefudōhara kawara gama ato	Oyama	late Nara / early Heian period kiln	Otomefudōhara Tile Kiln ruins	36°15′44″N 139°45′22″E	6	490
Shimotsuke Provincial Capital ruins 下野国庁跡 Shimotsuke kokuchō ato	Tochigi	late Nara / early Heian period Kokufu	Shimotsuke Provincial Capital ruins	36°22′46″N 139°47′06″E	2	493
Shimotsuke Kokubun-ji ruins 下野国分寺跡 Shimotsuke Kokubunji ato	Shimotsuke	provincial temple of Shimotsuke Province	Shimotsuke Kokubunji ruins	36°23′08″N 139°48′23″E	3	463
Shimotsuke Kokubunni-ji ruins 下野国分尼寺跡 Shimotsuke Kokubunniji ato	Shimotsuke	provincial nunnery of Shimotsuke Province	Shimotsuke Kokubunniji ruins	36°23′08″N 139°48′46″E	3	485
Shimotsuke Yakushi-ji ruins 下野薬師寺跡 Shimotsuke Yakushiji ato	Shimotsuke	Nara period temple ruins	Shimotsuke Yakushiji ruins	36°24′06″N 139°52′34″E	3	462
Kabasaki-ji ruins 樺崎寺跡 Kabasaki-ji ato	Ashikaga	Kamakura period temple ruins	Kabasaki-ji ruins	36°21′41″N 139°29′39″E	3	3312
Ushizuka Kofun 牛塚古墳 Ushizuka kofun	Mibu	Kofun period tumulus	Ushizuka Kofun	36°26′14″N 139°48′28″E	1	475
Azuma Kofun 吾妻古墳 Azuma kofun	Tochigi, Mibu	Kofun period tumulus	Azuma Kofun	36°24′16″N 139°48′41″E	1	487
Negoyadai Site 根古谷台遺跡 Negoyadai iseki	Utsunomiya	Jōmon period settlement ruins	Negoyadai Site	36°32′07″N 139°49′58″E	1	495
Sanuki Stone Buddha 佐貫石仏 Sanuki sekibutsu	Shioya		Sanuki Stone Buddha	36°45′01″N 139°47′58″E	3	471
Sakuramachi Jin'ya 桜町陣屋跡 Sakuramachi jin'ya ato	Mooka	Edo period fortified residence	Sakuramachi Jin'ya	36°24′29″N 140°00′53″E	2	478
Samuraizuka Kofun 侍塚古墳 Samuraizuka Kofun	Ōtawara	designation comprises Kami-Samuraizuka Kofun (上侍塚古) and Shimo-Samuraizuka Kofun (下侍塚古墳)	Samuraizuka Kofun	36°48′47″N 140°07′22″E	1	483
Teranohigashi Site 寺野東遺跡 Teranohigashi iseki	Oyama		Teranohigashi Site	36°19′36″N 139°52′52″E	1	497
Kurumazuka Kofun 車塚古墳 Kurumazuka Kofun	Mibu	Kofun period tumulus	Kurumazuka Kofun	36°26′14″N 139°48′33″E	1	474
Kogane Ichirizuka 小金井一里塚 Kogane ichirizuka	Shimotsuke	Edo period highway marker	Kogane Ichirizuka	36°22′40″N 139°50′28″E	6	466
Oyama clan Castle Sites 小山氏城跡 Oyama-shi shiro ato	Oyama	designations comprises the sites of Washi Castle (鷲城跡), Gion Castle (祇園城跡), and Nakakuki Castle (中久喜城跡)	Oyama clan Castle Sites	36°19′09″N 139°48′00″E	2	496
Kamikōnushi-Mobara Kanga ruins 上神主・茂原官衙遺跡 Kamikōnushi・Mobara kanga iseki	Utsunomiya, Kaminokawa	Nara-Heian period local government complex ruins	Kamikōnushi-Mobara Kanga ruins	36°27′54″N 139°53′01″E	2	3374
Mibu Ichirizuka 壬生一里塚 Mibu ichirizuka	Mibu	Edo period highway marker	Mibu Ichirizuka	36°24′57″N 139°48′12″E	6	476
Senju-ji Precincts 専修寺境内 Senjuji keidai	Mooka		Senjuji Precincts	36°23′38″N 140°01′23″E	3	486
Ashio Copper Mine 足尾銅山跡 Ashio dōzan ato	Nikkō	designation includes the Tsūdō Mine (通洞坑) and Utsuno Magazine (宇都野火薬庫跡)	Ashio Copper Mine	36°38′01″N 139°26′16″E	6	00003567
Ashikaga Gakkō 足利学校跡（聖廟及び附属建物を含む) Ashikaga Gakkō	Ashikaga	designation includes the shrine and annex	Ashikaga Gakkō	36°20′09″N 139°27′12″E	4	464
Ashikaga Family Residence 足利氏宅跡（鑁阿寺） Banna-ji	Ashikaga		Ashikaga Family Residence (Banna-ji)	36°20′15″N 139°27′08″E	2, 8	468
Chausuyama Kofun 茶臼山古墳 Chausuyama kofun	Mibu	Kofun period tumulus		36°29′23″N 139°46′41″E	1	484
Chōjagadaira Kanga ruins 長者ヶ平官衙遺跡附東山道跡 Chōjagadaira kanga iseki tsuketari Tōsandō ato	Nasukarasuyama, Sakura			36°40′53″N 140°02′45″E	2, 6	00003619
Karanogosho Cave Tomb 唐御所横穴 Karanogosho yokoana	Nakagawa	Kofun period cave tomb	Karanogosho Cave Tomb	36°44′37″N 140°09′24″E	1	479
Fujimoto Kannonyama Kofun 藤本観音山古墳 Fujimoto Kannonyama kofun	Ashikaga	Kofun period tumulus	Fujimoto Kannonyama Kofun	36°18′02″N 139°26′09″E	1	00003498
Nasu Kanga ruins 那須官衙遺跡 Nasu Kanga iseki	Nakagawa		Nasu Kanga ruins	36°46′52″N 140°06′35″E	2	488
Nasu Ogawa Kofun Cluster 那須小川古墳群 Nasu Ogawa kofun-gun	Nakagawa	designation includes Komagata Ōzuka Kofun (駒形大塚古墳), Yoshida Yuzen Jinja Kofun Cluster (吉田温泉神社古墳群), and Nasu Hachimanzuka Kofun Cluster (那須八幡塚古墳群)		36°45′41″N 140°07′16″E	1	492
Nasu Kanda Castle ruins 那須神田城跡 Nasu Kanda-jō ato	Nakagawa	Heian period castle ruins		36°45′07″N 140°07′38″E	2	494
Shrines and Temples of Nikkō 日光山内 Nikkō-san nai	Nikkō	UNESCO World Heritage Site	Shrines and Temples of Nikkō	36°45′31″N 139°35′52″E	3	3211
Tobiyama Castle ruins 飛山城跡 Tobiyama-jō ato	Utsunomiya	Kamakura period castle ruins	Tobiyama Castle ruins	36°33′20″N 139°57′58″E	2	489
Biwazuka Kofun 琵琶塚古墳 Biwazuka kofun	Oyama	Kofun period tumulus	Biwazuka Kofun	36°22′29″N 139°48′25″E	1	472
Marishitenzuka Kofun 摩利支天塚古墳 Marishitenzuka kofun	Oyama	Kofun period tumulus	Marishitenzuka Kofun	36°22′20″N 139°48′21″E	1	491
Karasawayama Castle ruins 唐沢山城跡 Karasawayama-jō ato	Sano		Karasawayama Castle ruins	36°18′52″N 139°34′42″E	2	00003835
Karasuyama Castle Site 烏山城跡 Karasuyama-jō ato	Nasukarasuyama		Karasuyama Castle Site	36°39′51″N 140°08′51″E	2	00004173
Nishikata Castle Site 西方城跡; Nishikata-jō ato	Tochigi			36°28′25″N 139°43′12″E		

== Prefectural Historic Sites ==
As of 1 May 2023, forty-nine Sites have been designated as being of prefectural importance.

Site	Municipality	Comments	Image	Coordinates	Type	Ref.
Tsukayama Kofun 塚山古墳; Tsukayama kofun	Utsunomiya			36°30′22″N 139°51′39″E		
Sendazuka Kofun 千駄塚古墳; Sendazuka kofun	Oyama			36°16′55″N 139°46′29″E		
Ōzukadai Kofun 大塚台古墳; Ōzukadai kofun	Haga			36°34′59″N 140°03′34″E		
Hyōtanzuka Kofun 瓢箪塚古墳; Hyōtanzuka kofun	Mooka			36°25′25″N 139°59′20″E		
Kazatozuka Kofun 風戸塚古墳; Kazatozuka kofun	Mashiko			36°29′11″N 140°05′45″E		
Nagaoka Hyakuana Kofun 長岡百穴古墳; Nagaoka Hyakuana kofun	Utsunomiya			36°35′47″N 139°52′50″E		
Hachimanyama Kofun Cluster 八幡山古墳群; Hachimanyama kofun-gun	Ashikaga			36°19′26″N 139°26′09″E		
Myōtetsu Zenji Grave 妙哲禅師の墓 附 墓碑; Myōtetsu Zenji no haka tsuketari bohi	Utsunomiya			36°39′15″N 139°49′35″E		
Sesshō-seki 殺生石; Sesshō seki	Nasu			37°05′59″N 140°00′02″E		
Kamenokozuka Kofun 亀の子塚古墳; Kamenokozuka kofun	Haga			36°30′06″N 140°01′05″E		
Sasazuka Kofun 笹塚古墳; Sasazuka kofun	Utsunomiya			36°28′53″N 139°53′53″E		
Ōzuka Kofun 大塚古墳; Ōzuka kofun	Utsunomiya			36°35′27″N 139°52′26″E		
Ōmasuzuka Kofun 大桝塚古墳; Ōmasuzuka kofun	Sano			36°19′31″N 139°35′35″E		
Tanaka Shōzō Former Residence 田中正造旧宅; Tanaka Shōzō kyū-taku	Sano			36°20′16″N 139°33′16″E		
Ninomiya Sontoku Grave 二宮尊徳の墓; Ninomiya Sontoku no haka	Nikkō			36°43′32″N 139°41′21″E		
Atagozuka Kofun 愛宕塚古墳; Atagozuka kofun	Oyama			36°18′55″N 139°49′18″E		
Bishamonyama Kofun 毘沙門山古墳; Bishamonyama kofun	Oyama			36°17′28″N 139°44′45″E		
Ōuchi Haiji Site and Tōhōdadō 大内廃寺跡 附 塔法田堂跡; Ōuchi Haiji ato tsuketari Tōhōdadō ato	Mooka			36°28′32″N 140°01′47″E		
Shōdō Shōnin Birthplace 日光開山勝道上人誕生地; Nikkō kaizan Shōdō shōnin tanjō-chi	Mooka	at Butsusei-ji (仏生寺)		36°24′27″N 140°03′13″E		
Fujiyama Kofun 富士山古墳; Fujiyama kofun	Mibu			36°29′19″N 139°46′56″E		
Nagatsuka Kofun 長塚古墳; Nagatsuka kofun	Mibu			36°28′36″N 139°46′18″E		
Kamezuka Kofun 亀塚古墳; Kamezuka kofun	Mibu			36°29′58″N 139°49′51″E		
Ōtsuka Kofun 大塚古墳; Ōzuka kofun	Nogi			36°12′52″N 139°45′02″E		
Kanayamazuka Kofun 金山塚古墳; Kanayamazuka kofun	Iwafune			36°18′03″N 139°41′58″E		
Nishihara Kofun 西原古墳; Nishihara kofun	Sakura			36°44′43″N 139°58′57″E		
Niwatorizuka Kofun 鶏塚古墳; Niwatorizuka kofun	Mooka			36°28′57″N 140°01′51″E		
Yoneyama Kofun 米山古墳; Yoneyama kofun	Sano			36°19′32″N 139°36′31″E		
Nyūjōzuka Kofun 入定塚古墳; Nyūjōzuka kofun	Mashiko			36°29′14″N 140°05′55″E		
Oyake Kofun Cluster 小宅古墳群; Oyake kofun-gun	Mashiko			36°30′38″N 140°06′47″E		
Nakamura Castle Site 中村城跡; Nakamura-jō ato	Mooka			36°24′34″N 139°57′26″E		
Koyama Castle Site 児山城跡; Koyama-jō ato	Shimotsuke			36°26′51″N 139°51′08″E		
Jinzen Tomoe Inn 深山巴の宿; Jinzen Tomoe no juku	Kanuma			36°38′53″N 139°30′27″E		
Tenjinyama Kofun 天神山古墳; Tenjinyama kofun	Mooka			36°22′50″N 140°00′40″E		
Gozenbara Castle Site 御前原城跡; Gozenbara-jō ato	Yaita			36°47′20″N 139°56′41″E		
Nogi Maresuke Residence at Nasu 乃木希典那須野旧宅; Nogi Maresuki Nasu no kyū-taku	Nasushiobara			36°53′15″N 140°00′10″E		
Murakami Castle Site 村上城跡; Murakami-jō ato	Ichikai			36°33′27″N 140°07′08″E		
Utsunomiya Family Grave Site 宇都宮家の墓所; Utsunomiya-ke bosho	Mashiko			36°27′07″N 140°08′11″E		
Senbon Castle Site 千本城跡; Senbon-jō ato	Motegi			36°34′35″N 140°09′09″E		
Tsukayama-nishi Kofun 塚山西古墳; Tsukayama-nishi kofun	Utsunomiya			36°30′21″N 139°51′35″E		
Tsukayama-minami Kofun 塚山南古墳; Tsukayama-minami kofun	Utsunomiya			36°30′18″N 139°51′37″E		
Saimyō-ji Precinct 西明寺境内; Saimyōji keidai	Mashiko			36°27′10″N 140°07′02″E		
Hosokawa Clan Graves 細川家の墓所; Hosokawa-ke no haka	Motegi	at Nōji-in (能持院)		36°32′33″N 140°12′07″E		
Maruzuka Kofun 丸塚古墳; Maruzuka kofun	Shimotsuke			36°23′31″N 139°48′41″E		
Atagozuka Kofun 愛宕塚古墳; Atagozuka kofun	Shimotsuke			36°23′31″N 139°48′36″E		
Shakadō Junshi Graves and Fudai Family Graves 釈迦堂殉死の墓及び譜代家臣の墓; Shakadō junshi no haka oyobi Fudai-ka shin no haka	Nikkō	at Rinnō-ji		36°45′16″N 139°36′03″E		
Mumo Castle Site 武茂城跡（乾徳寺境内を含む） Mumo-jō ato (Kentokuji keidai o fukumu)	Nakagawa	designation includes the precinct of Kentoku-ji (乾徳寺)		36°44′31″N 140°10′22″E		
Horikoshi Site 堀越遺跡; Horikoshi iseki	Yaita			36°49′34″N 139°55′01″E		
Prefectural Office Moat 県庁堀 附 漕渠; Kenchō bori tsuketari sōkyo	Tochigi			36°22′52″N 139°43′48″E		
Sengenzuka Kofun 浅間塚古墳; Sengenzuka kofun	Mashiko			36°29′12″N 140°05′04″E		

== Municipal Historic Sites ==
As of 1 May 2023, a further four hundred and five Sites have been designated as being of municipal importance.

== See also ==
- Cultural Properties of Japan
- Shimotsuke Province
- Tochigi Prefectural Museum
- List of Places of Scenic Beauty of Japan (Tochigi)
