= Karanogosho Cave Tomb =

- 唐御所横穴 (Japanese)
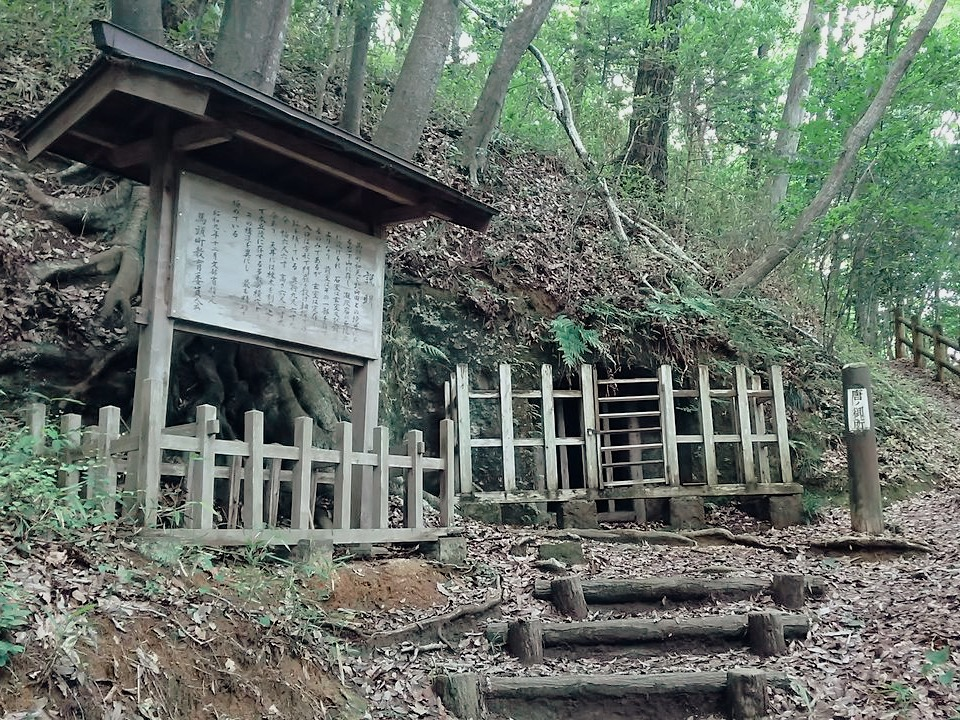
- Karanogosho Cave Tomb

- Karanogosho Cave Tomb Karanogosho Cave Tomb (Japan)
- 36°44′37.6″N 140°9′23.9″E
- Periods: Kofun period
- Location: Nakagawa, Tochigi, Japan
- Region: Kantō region

Site notes
- Public access: Yes (public park)

The Karanogosho Cave Tomb (唐御所横穴, Karanogosho yokoana) is a yokoanabo tomb located in the town of Nakagawa, Tochigi Prefecture in the northern Kantō region of Japan. It was designated a National Historic Site of Japan in 1934.

== Overview ==
The tomb is one of many which were dug into the southern slope of the tuff hills on the eastern bank of the Naka River during the late Kofun period. The Karanogosho Cave Tomb is presumed to have been built in the 7th century. The ceiling of the entrance vestibule, which is about 2.75 meters long, is made to resemble a gable roof. Within is a burial chamber with a 1.9 meter ceiling, 2.34 meter width and 4.78 meter length, containing U-shaped stands for three caskets. The tomb is the most elaborate of the many tombs in the area, and can be viewed by a walkway with facilities for rest and explanation placards.

The tomb is associated in legend with the rebellion of Taira no Masakado in the Heian period and is variously claimed to have been used as a cave-prison, or as a hiding place for one of Masakado's daughters, who is claimed to have given birth to a son in this location. Fearing for the infant's safety should his identity be revealed, she claimed to have been a princess from Tang China, hence the name of the tomb was called the Kara no Gosho, or "Tang Palace". There is no documentary evidence to support any of these legends.

The site is about 30 minutes by car from Karasuyama Station on the JR East Karasuyama Line.

== See also ==
- List of Historic Sites of Japan (Tochigi)
