= Tobiyama Castle =

Castle in Utsunomiya, Tochigi Prefecture, Japan

- 飛山城
- Utsunomiya, Tochigi Prefecture, Japan
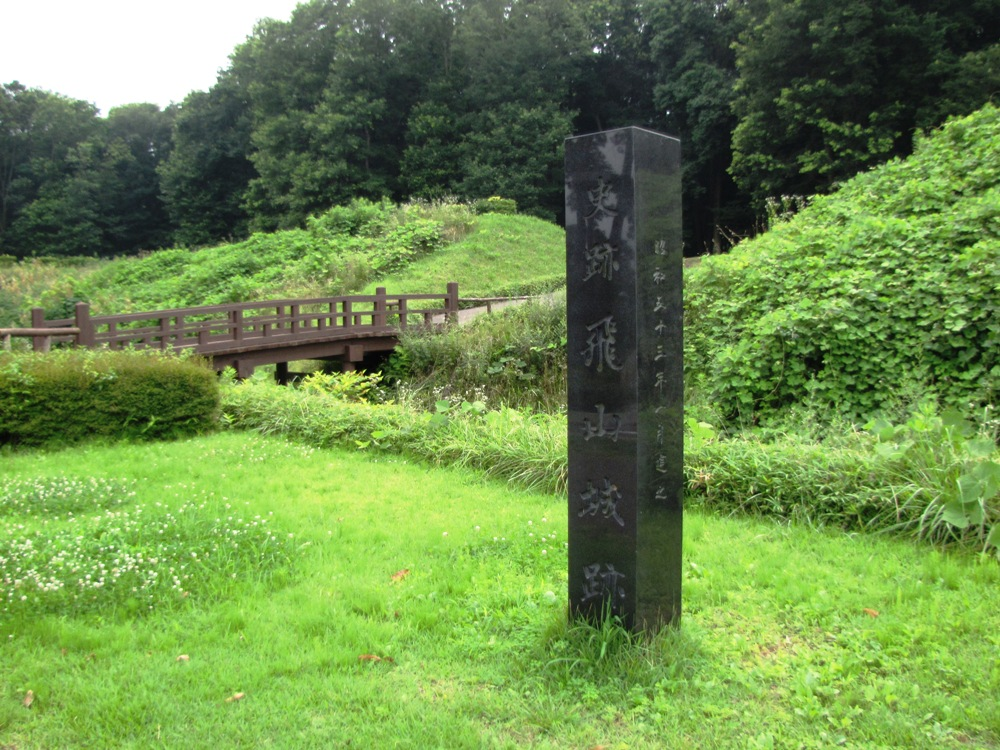
- Tobiyama Castle Front Entrance

Site information
- Type: hirayama-style Japanese castle
- Open to the public: yes
- Condition: ruins

Location
- Location within Tochigi Prefecture Location within Japan
- Coordinates: 36°33′20.1″N 139°57′57.6″E

Site history
- Built: late Kamakura period
- Built by: Haga clan
- In use: Sengoku period
- Demolished: 1590

Tobiyama Castle (飛山城, Tobiyama jō) was a Muromachi period Japanese castle located in what is now part of the city of Utsunomiya, Tochigi Prefecture, in the northern Kantō region of Japan. The site has been protected as a National Historic Site since 1977.

== History ==
Tobiyama Castle was built as the stronghold of the Haga clan, retainers of the Utsunomiya clan, in the 13th century. The Haga were an ancient gōzoku clan of Mutsu Province who claimed descent from the Kiyohara clan. The clan was noted for its fierce independence from the Hiraizumi-based Northern Fujiwara, but became vassals of the Utsunomiya, the lords of Shimotsuke Province, from the 11th century. During the Nanboku-chō period, the power of the Utsunomiya clan waned due to conflicts with the neighboring Oyama clan and the Kantō kubō, and the Haga clan gradually supplanted the Utsunomiya.

Under Utsunomiya Shigetsuna (1468-1516), the Utsunomiya reasserted its control over the Haga clan. During the early Sengoku period. the Utsunomiya allied with the Satake clan of Hitachi Province against the increasing aggression of the Later Hōjō clan, with Tobiyama Castle forming a key point in the line of defense. However by the 1580s, the Hōjō clan had largely defeated the Utsunomiya and had extended their hegemony into the northern Kantō region. The Hōjō were in turn destroyed by Toyotomi Hideyoshi in the 1590 Battle of Odawara. The Utsunomiya survived, but were ordered by Toyotomi Hideyoshi to destroy all secondary fortifications within their territories, which included Tobiyama Castle. In 1597, the Utsunomiya were deprived of their holdings by Hideyoshi, and the Haga clan suffered from the same fate.

== Description of Tobiyama Castle ==
Tobiyama Castle is located on a river terrace on the east bank of the Kinugawa River, which runs north-south through Shimotsuke Province. The remains are spread over an area of approximately 14 hectares. River cliffs with a height of 25 meters on the western and northern sides provide a natural defense. The total size of the castle is 420 meters north-south by 240 meters east-west, and the castle consists of clay ramparts and dry moats forming three concentric enclosures. The Inner bailey and the middle bailey are the oldest parts of the castle, with relatively low walls and narrow moats, which are 15 meters wide and 4 meters deep The outer bailey is much larger and had higher walls and deeper moats and five yagura watchtowers. Each wall had embrasures to enable defenders to fire upon attackers from the side.

None of the internal structures of the castle remain intact, but its moats and ramparts are largely intact and preserved as Tobiyama Castle Historic Park since 2005. Adjacent to the park, the Tobiyama History Museum displays discovered artifacts, and provides an explanation of the historical context of the site. The castle site is roughly five kilometers east of the city center of Utsunomiya.

== See also ==
- List of Historic Sites of Japan (Tochigi)
