= Sakuramachi Jin'ya =

Sakuramachi jin'ya
- 桜町陣屋
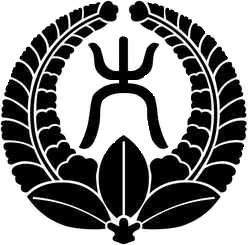
- Okubo clan crest

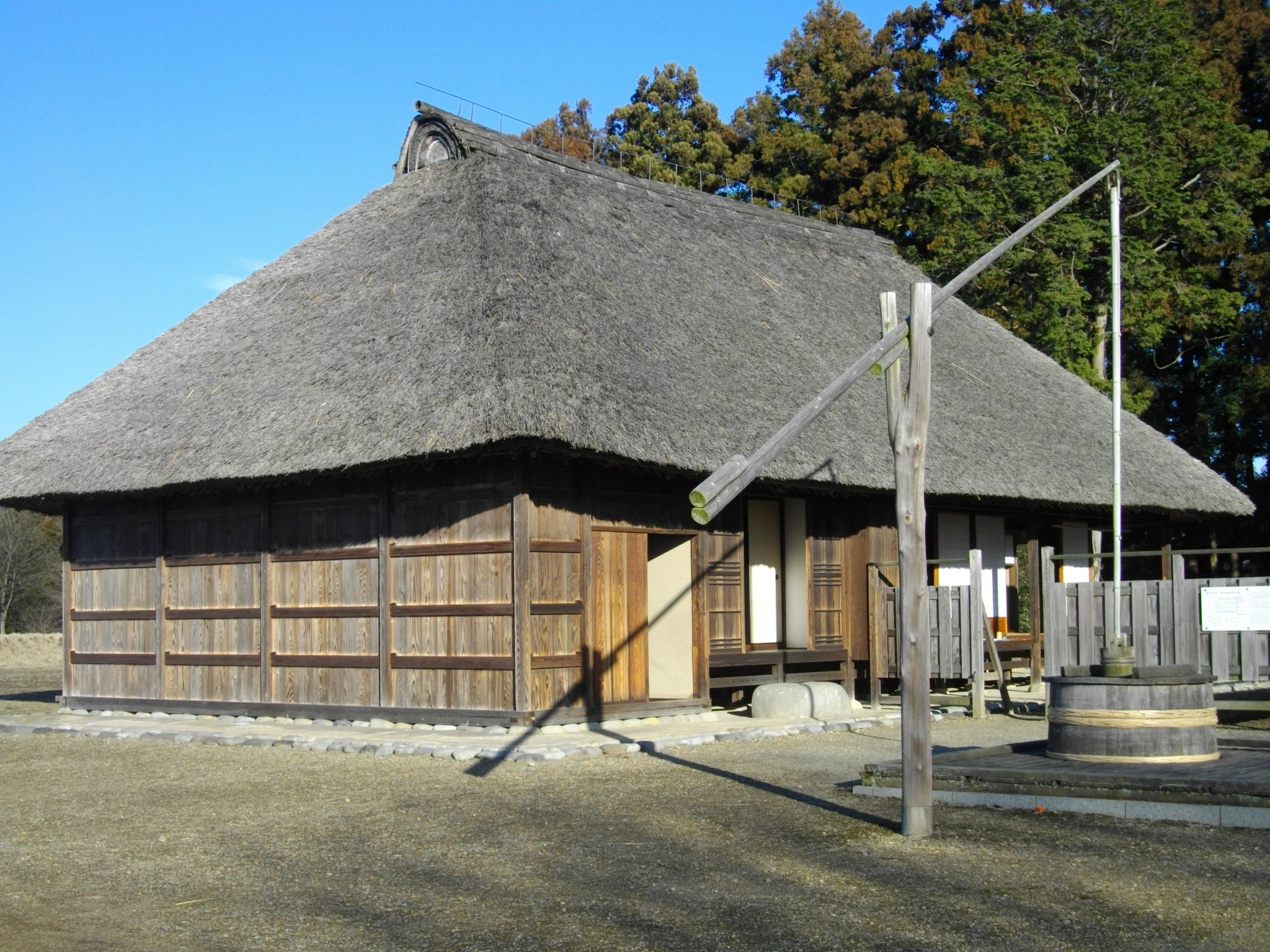
- Sakuramachi jin'ya

- Location within Tochigi Prefecture Location within Japan

General information
- Type: jin'ya
- Location: Mooka, Tochigi, Japan
- Coordinates: 36°24′29″N 140°00′53″E

The Sakuramachi jin'ya (桜町陣屋) was a jin'ya built in the Edo period located in the city of Mooka, Tochigi Prefecture in the northern Kantō region of Japan. It was designated a National Historic Site of Japan in 1932.

== Overview ==
Under the Edo period Tokugawa shogunate, Odawara Domain in Sagami Province was controlled by the Ōkubo clan. As with most domains in the han system, Odawara Domain consisted of several discontinuous territories calculated to provide its assigned kokudaka, and one of these holdings was a 4000 koku fief in Shimotsuke Province. The daimyō of Odawara, Ōkubo Tadatomo and constructed a fortified residence the following year for his third son to administer this exclave.

Originally, the jin'ya was a complex of 12-13 buildings with a large office, warehouses and stables, all surrounded by an earthen rampart.

Over time, due to poor farming practices and neglect, the lands of the Ōkubo holding became exhausted, with its yield dropping to less than 1000 koku. In 1823, Ōkubo Tadazane dispatched the noted scholar and agrarian reformer Ninomiya Sontoku to the territory in an attempt to restore it to productivity. Ninomiya spent 26 years at this location, implementing his theories of agrarian management, and was able to restore the territory to its former prosperity.

After the Meiji restoration, the jin'ja was abolished, and its surviving structures were destroyed, with the exception of the current single thatch-roof building and a fragment of the earthenworks on its south side. The National Historic site designation encompasses an area measuring 100 meters by 110 meters and includes a Shinto shrine dedicated by Ninomiya Sontoku and a local history museum, the Ninomiya Sontoku Shiryōkan (二宮尊徳資料館).

The jin'ya is located about 10 minutes on foot from Kugeta Station on the Mooka Railway.

== See also ==
- List of Historic Sites of Japan (Tochigi)
