= Samuraizuka Kofun =

- 侍塚古墳 (Japanese)
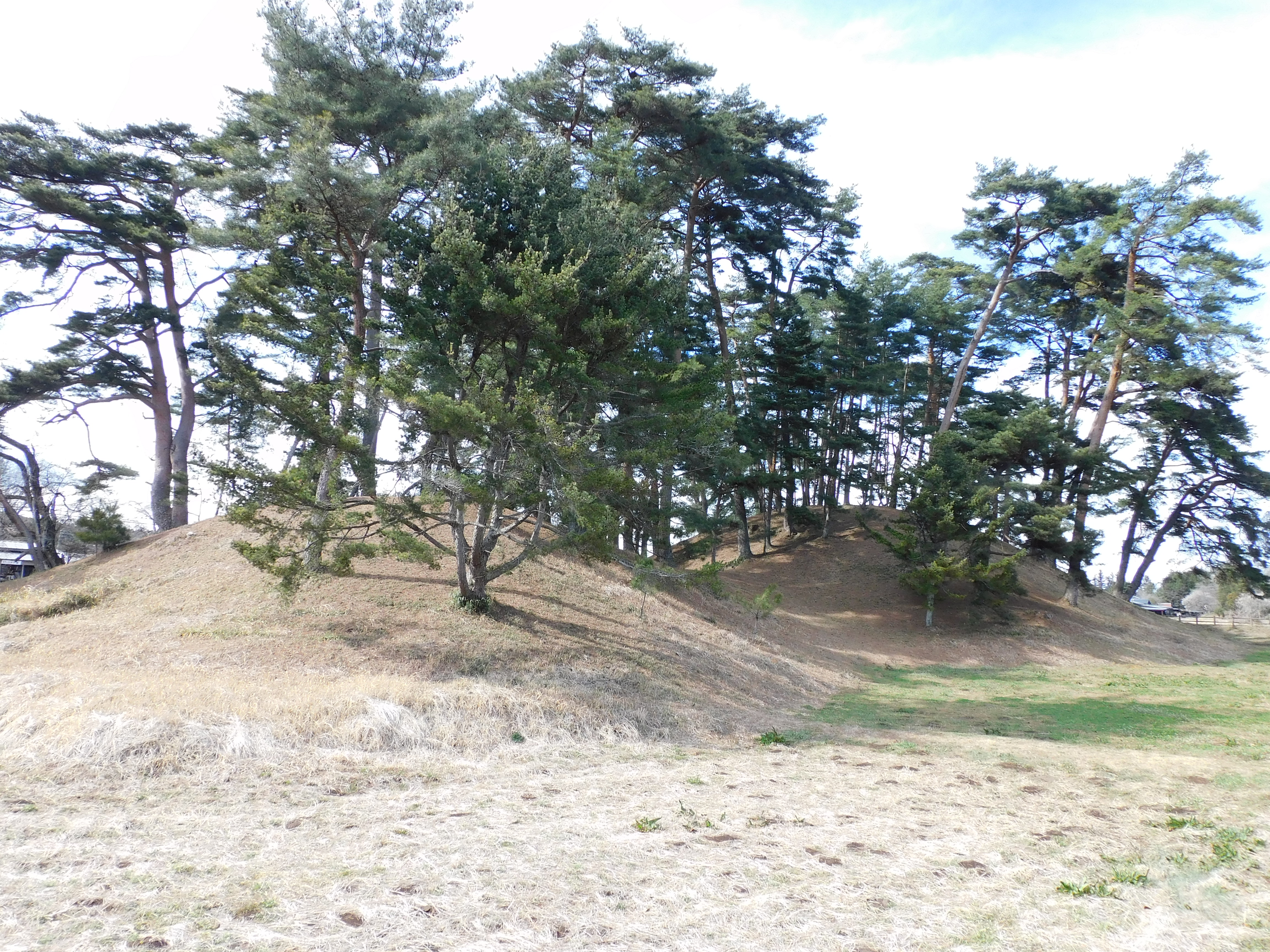
- Shimo-Samuraizuka Kofun

- Shimo-Samuraizuka Kofun Samuraizuka Kofun (Japan)
- 36°48′47.51″N 140°7′22.17″E
- Type: kofun
- Periods: Kofun period
- Location: Ōtawara, Tochigi, Japan
- Region: Kantō region

History
- Built: late 4th century AD

Site notes
- Public access: Yes

那須地方の前方後方墳分布図

The Samuraizuka Kofun (侍塚古墳) is a pair of Kofun period burial mounds located in the Yuzukami neighborhood of the city of Ōtawara in Tochigi Prefecture in the northern Kantō region of Japan. Both received protection as a National Historic Site in 1951. The neighborhood has many smaller kofun, including one keyhole-shaped tumulus, seven dome-shaped tumuli and one square-shaped tumulus, which are covered under an Ōtawara City Historic Site designation. These tumuli are considered to have been built around the beginning of the 5th century AD, with the Shimosamuraizuka being the older of the two. They are located a short walk from the "Sajizuka Parking Lot" bus stop on the municipal bus from Nasushiobara Station on the Tōhoku Shinkansen.

== Overview ==
The Samuraizuka Kofun are both "two conjoined rectangles" shaped (前方後方墳, zenpō-kōhō-fun). They are located on the right bank of the Naka River in the northern end of the Kanto Plain. The Shimo-Samuraizuka Kofun (下侍塚古墳) is to the north, and the Kami-Samuraizuka Kofun (上侍塚古墳) is located some 700 meters to the south. The kofun were excavated in 1692 by order of Tokugawa Mitsukuni, who kept a detailed illustrated records of the artifacts discovered. The artifacts were later placed in boxes made from Japanese red pine restored to the burial chambers, and the site was backfilled. Tokugawa Mitsukuni attributed the tombs to that of the Nasu Kuni no miyatsuko named "Ataiide" mentioned on a stele dated 689 AD discovered in a shrine in Ōtawara City, which lists the names of prehistoric rulers from the 5th century.

=== Kamisamuraizuka Kofun ===
The Kamisamuraizuka Kofun is the larger tumulus, with a total length of 114 meters and is the second largest in Tochigi Prefecture after the Fujimoto Kannonyama Kofun in Ashikaga. Fukiishi revetment stones are visible on the outer surface of the mound. A moat approximately 20 meters wide surrounds the mound on its north, west, and south sides. The burial facility appears to be a clay sarcophagus buried directly at the top of the posterior section. Grave goods discovered during Edo period investigations include a bronze mirror (possibly a twisted-pattern mirror), two tubular beads, one stone bracelet, iron artifacts (18 iron arrowheads, 5 armor fragments, 1 iron artifact fragment, 1 iron spearhead, 1 armor plate, 22 armor fragments, 1 iron sword fragment), and earthenware (a pedestaled bowl). The construction period is estimated to be around the end of the 4th century, at the beginning of the middle Kofun period. Along with the Shimozamuraizuka Kofun, it is one of the representative burial mounds of the Nasu region. Furthermore, after the 1692 Edo period excavation, pine trees were planted to preserve the mound, making it a historically significant burial mound in archaeology, both for its first academic excavation and for the preservation of cultural properties after the excavation. A ground-penetrating radar survey of the mound was conducted in 2021.

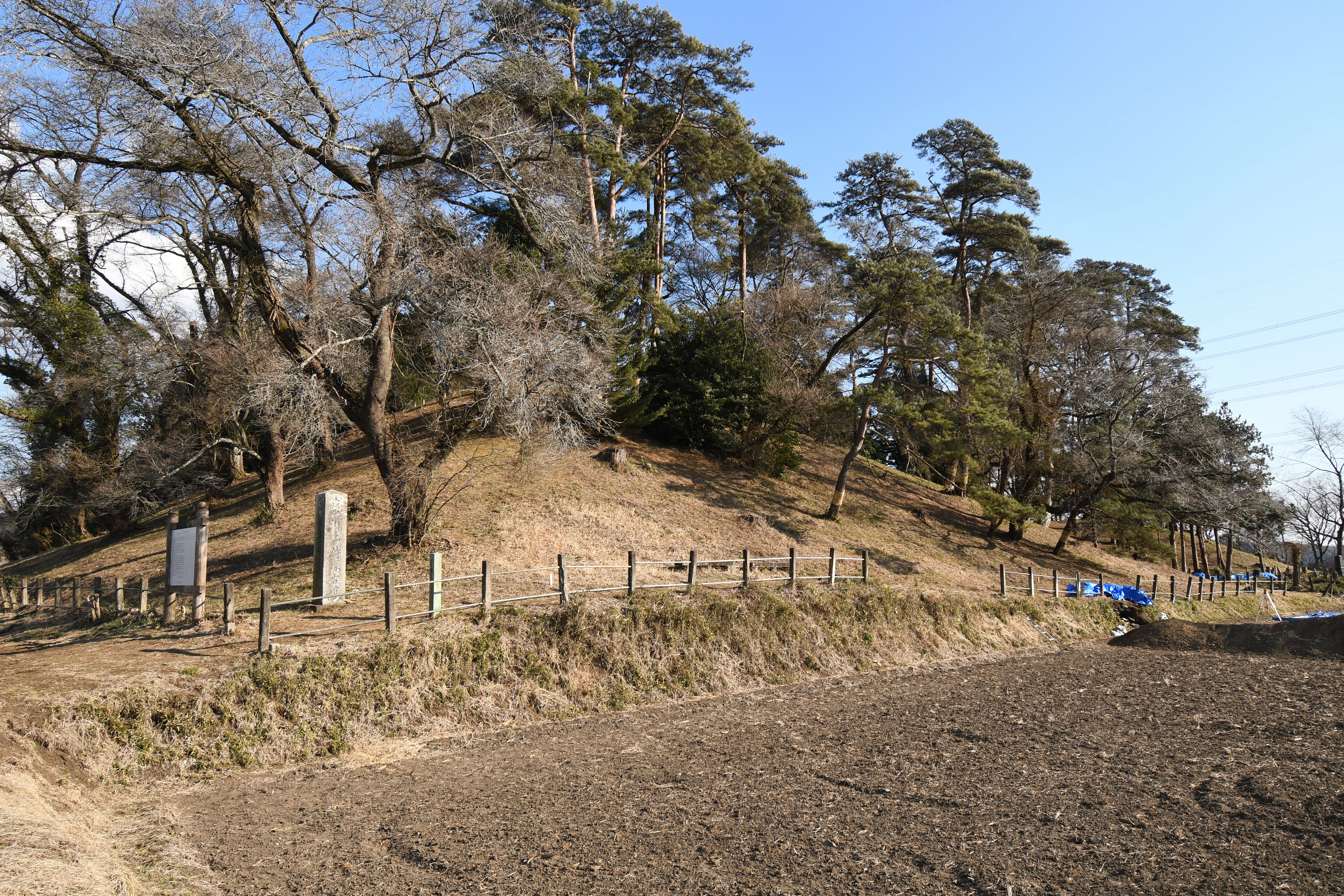
Overview

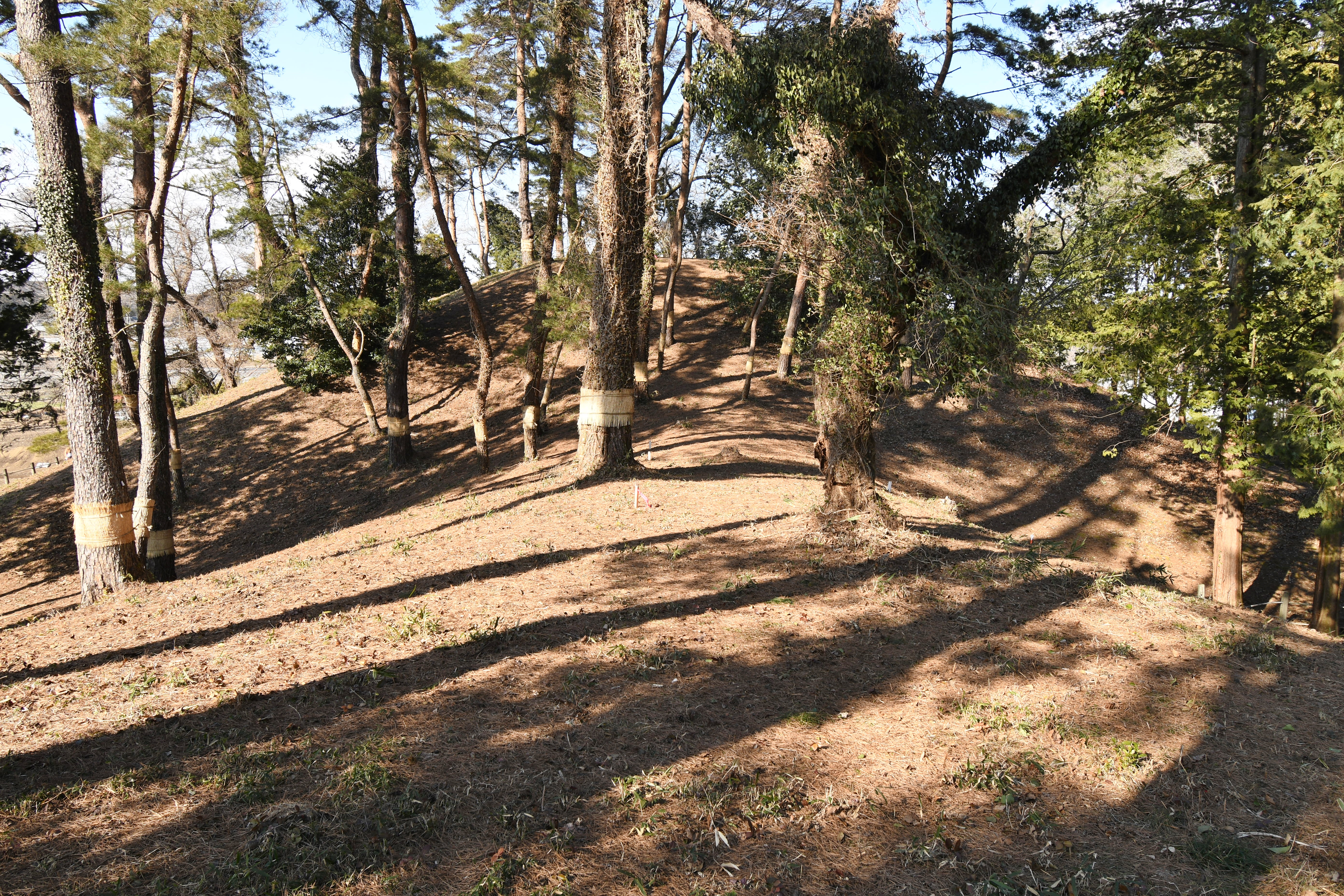
View from the front section to the rear section

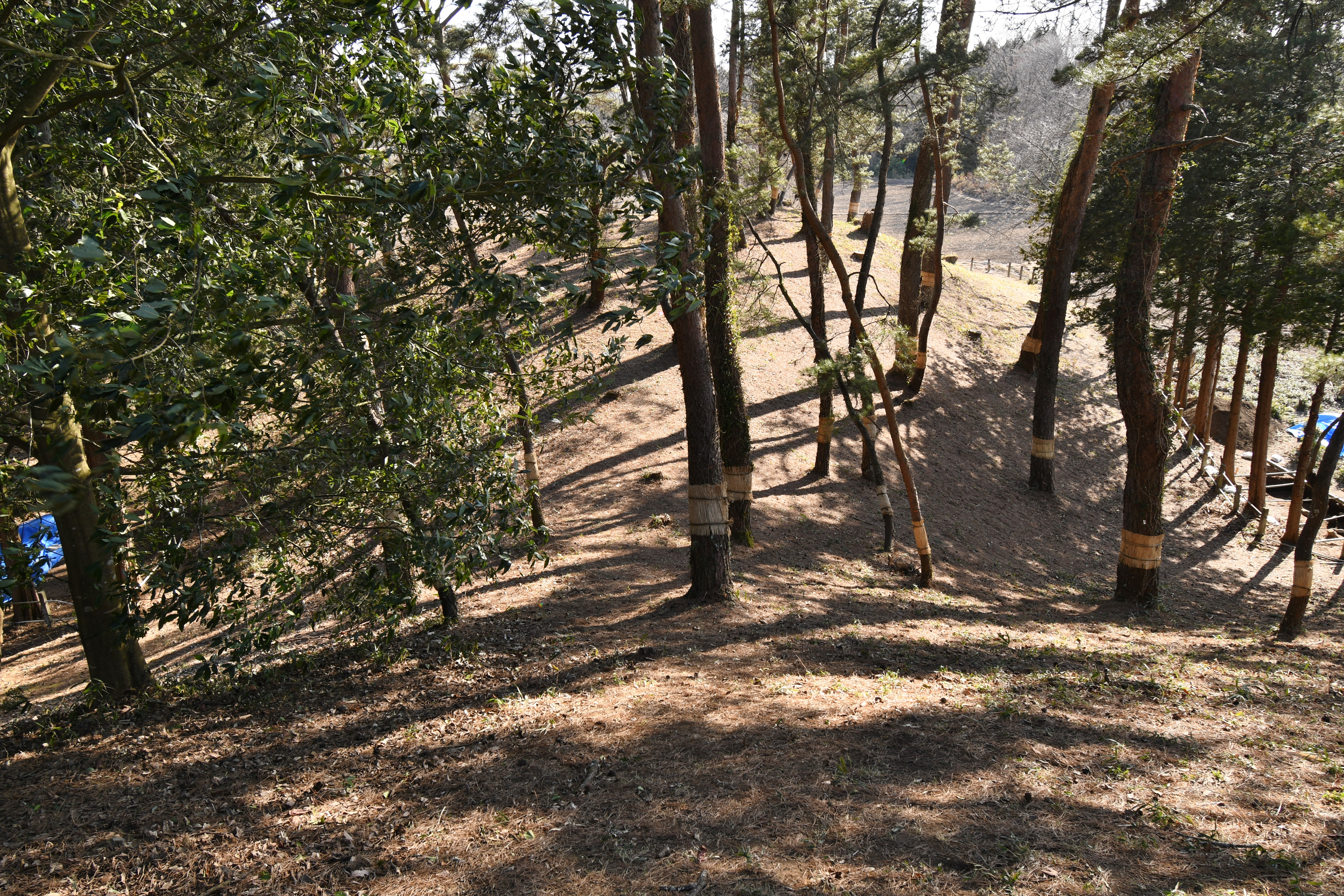
View from the rear section to the front section

Overall length
114 meters
Posterior portion
60 meters wide x 12 meters high
Anterior portion
52 meters wide x 7 meters high

=== Shimosamuraizuka Kofun ===
The Shimosamuraizuka has a total length of 84 meters, and was surrounded by a moat. The tumulus is orientated with the front section facing south. Fukiishi revetment stones are visible on the outer surface of the mound. A moat surrounds the mound, and a perforated earthenware vessel (a red-painted, stepped-rimmed jar) has been discovered within the moat. The burial facility is a direct burial in a wooden coffin on the summit of the posterior section, with clay lumps placed at both ends. Grave goods discovered during 1692 Edo period investigations include a bronze mirror (one mirror depicting two gods and two beasts), iron artifacts (15 sword fragments, armor fragments, one sword hilt, and one iron spearhead), and earthenware vessels (four pedestaled bowls and one possibly jar). The construction period is estimated to be around the end of the 4th century, at the beginning of the middle Kofun period. Along with the Kamisamuraizuka Kofun, it is one of the representative burial mounds of the Nasu region. Furthermore, after the Edo period excavation, pine trees were planted to preserve the mound, along with the Kamisamuraizuka Kofun. In 1975, the Shimo-Samuraizuka was trench excavated in connection with a land improvement project and more Haji-ware shards were discovered.

Overall length
84 meters
Posterior portion
48 meters wide x 9.4 meters high
Anterior portion
36 meters wide x 5 meters high

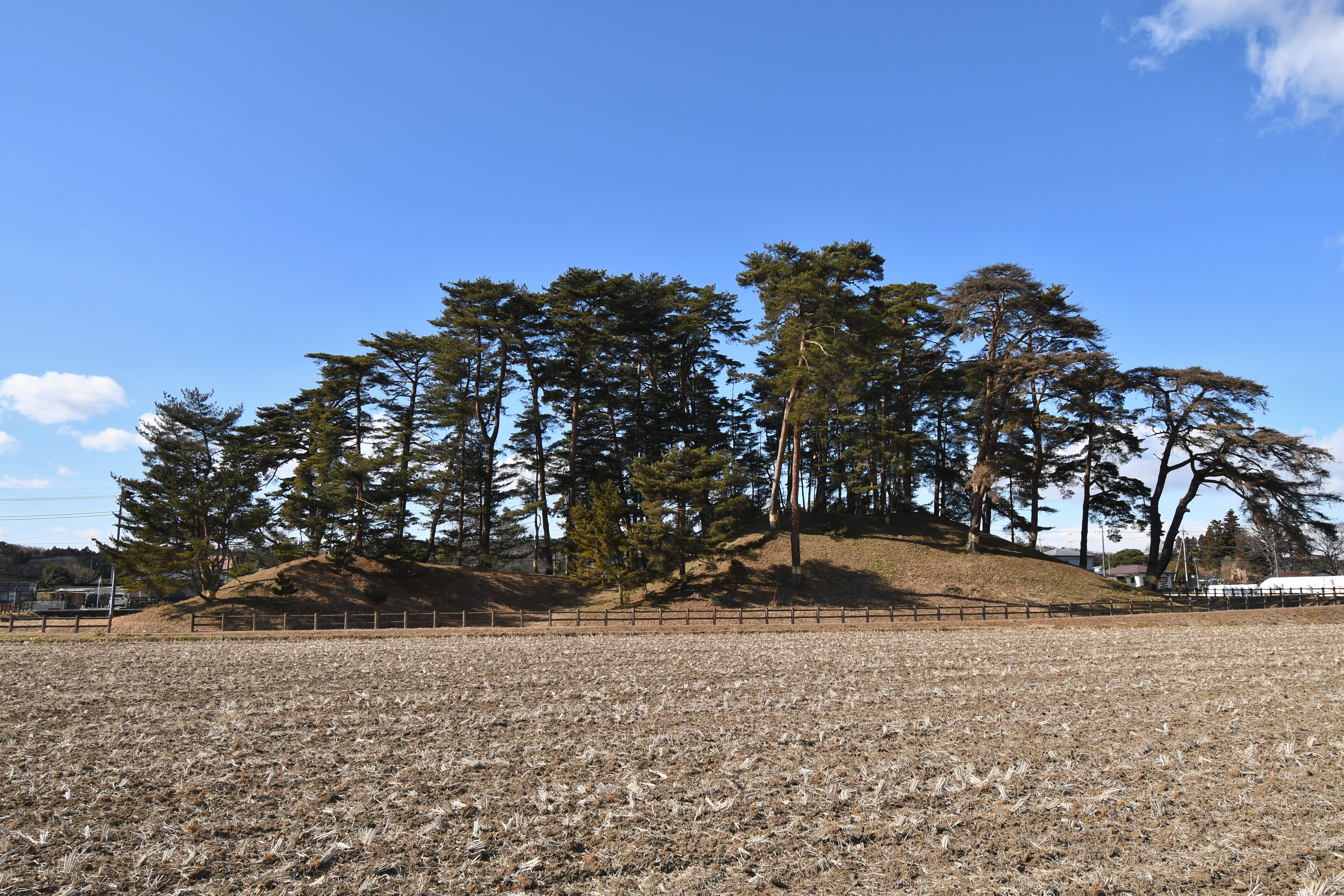
Overview

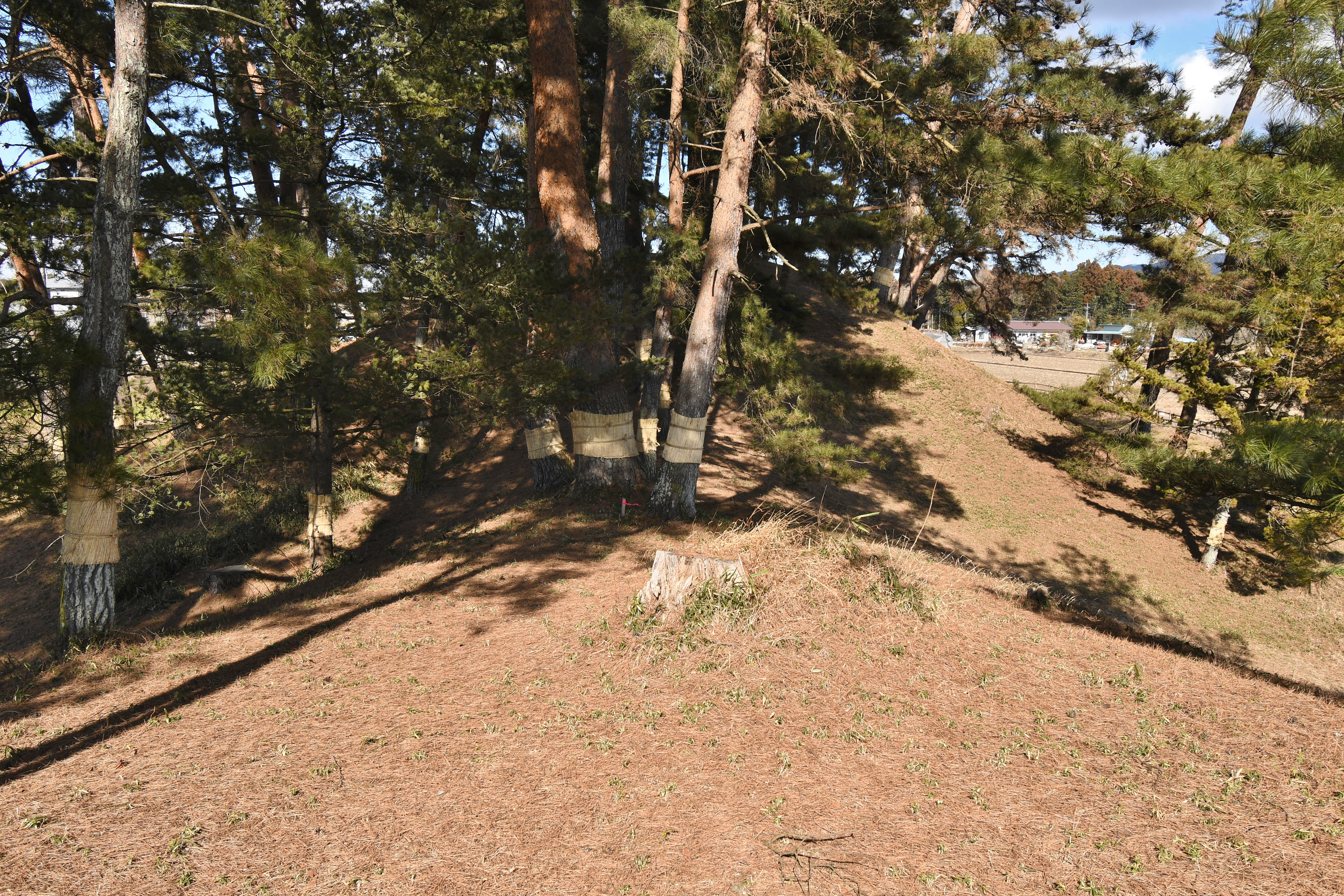
View from the front section to the rear section

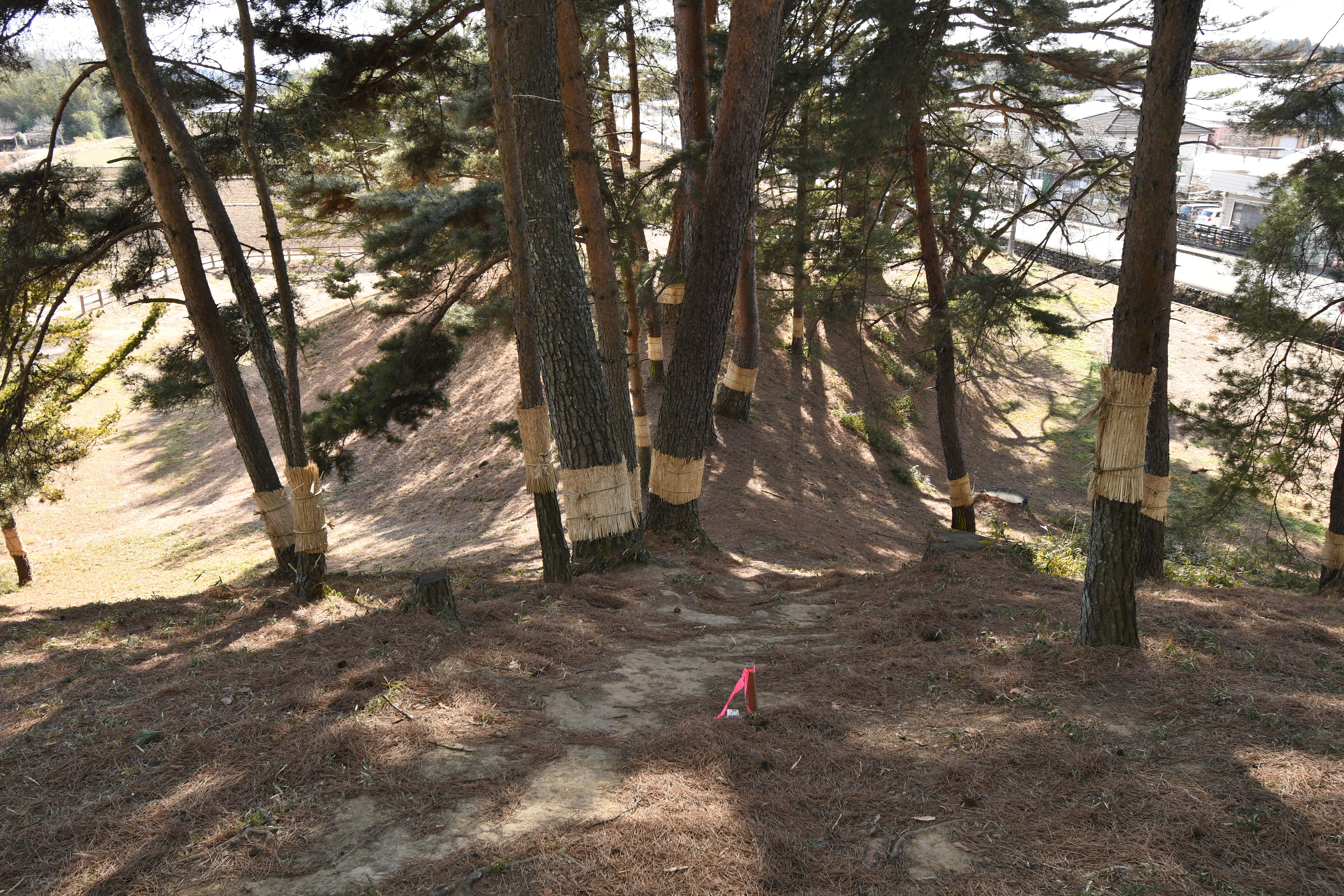
View from the rear section to the front section

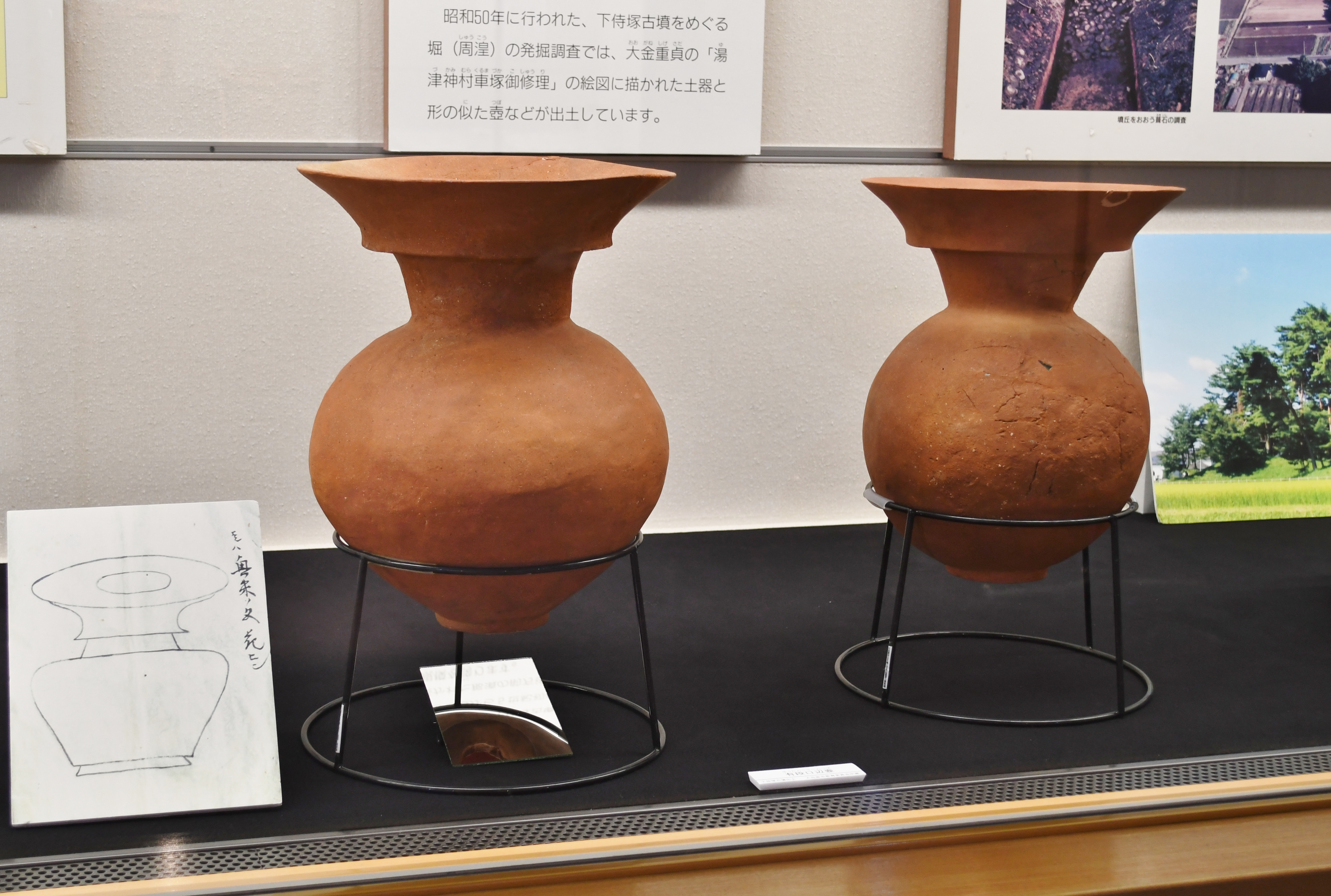
Stepped-mouth jar
Exhibited at Otawara City Nasu Fudoki no Oka Yuzukami Museum.

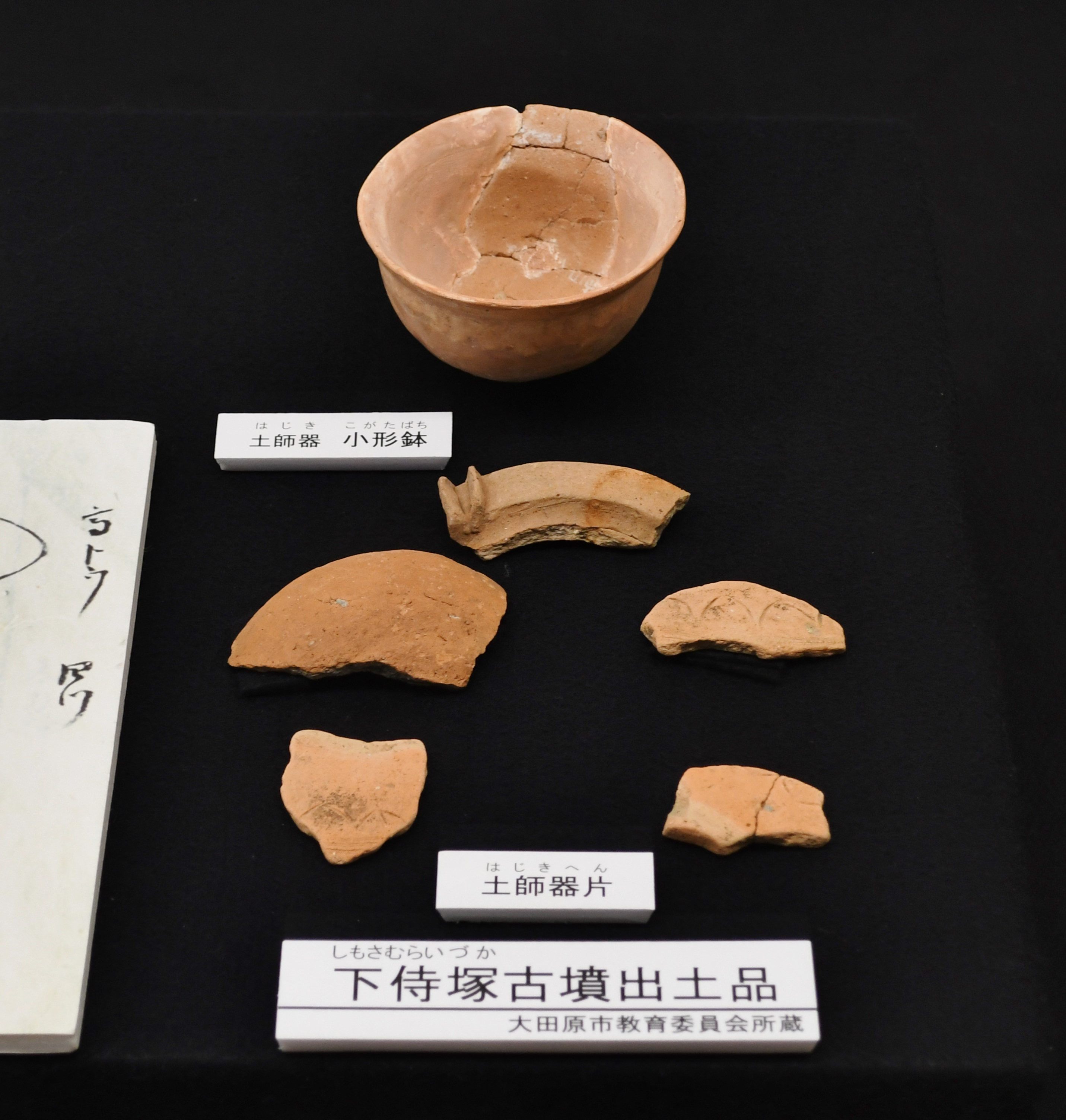
Haji ware
Exhibited at Otawara City Nasu Fudoki no Oka Yuzukami Museum.

== See also ==
- List of Historic Sites of Japan (Tochigi)
