= Oyama Castle =

Castle in Japan

- 小山城
- Oyama, Tochigi, Japan
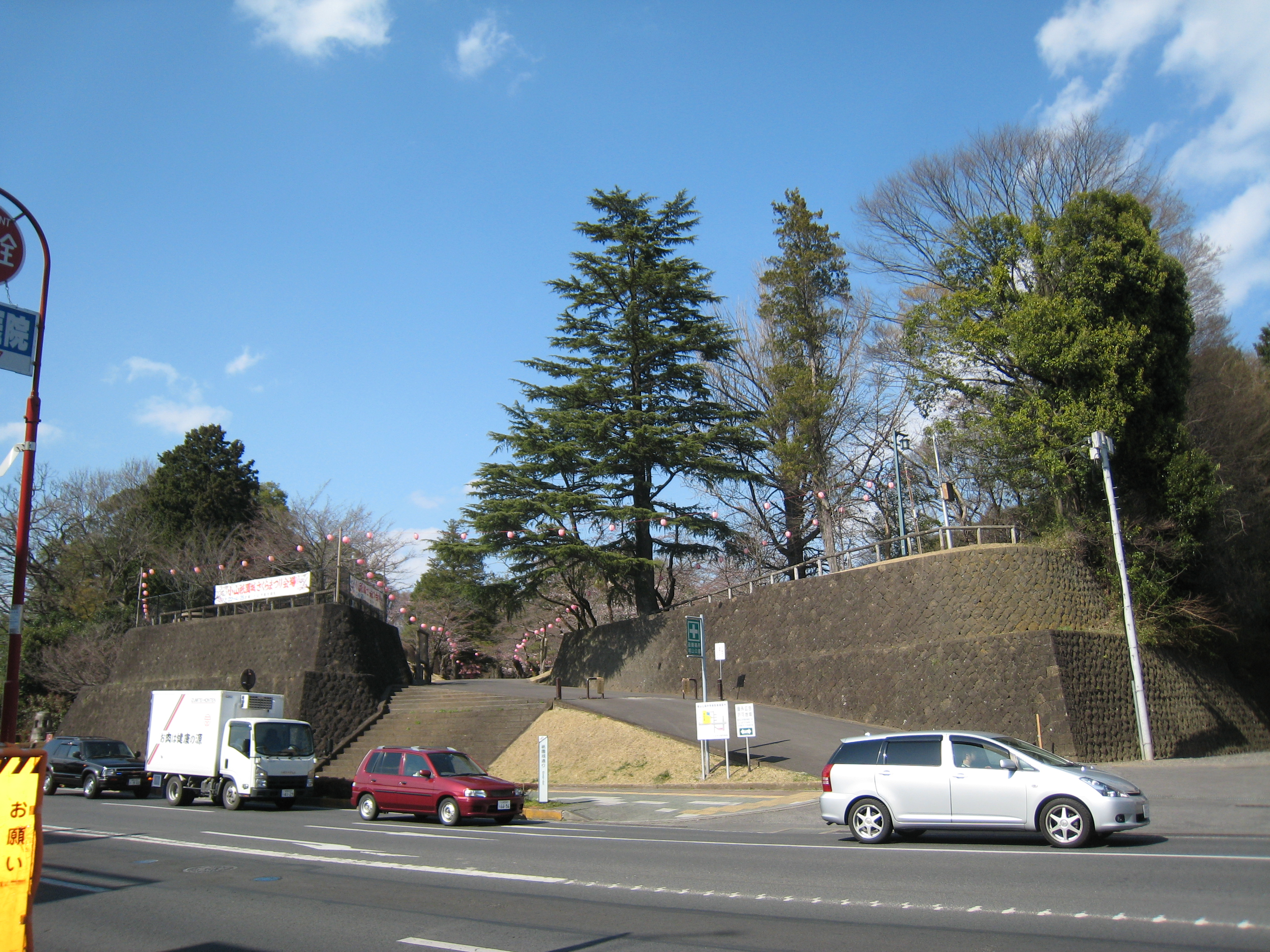
- Entrance to Oyama Castle Oyama Castle (Tochigi Prefecture) Oyama Castle (Japan)

Site information
- Type: hirayama-style Japanese castle
- Open to the public: yes
- Condition: ruins

Location
- Coordinates: 36°19′9.6″N 139°48′00″E

Site history
- Built: 1148
- Built by: Oyama Masamitsu
- In use: Muromachi period
- Demolished: 1619

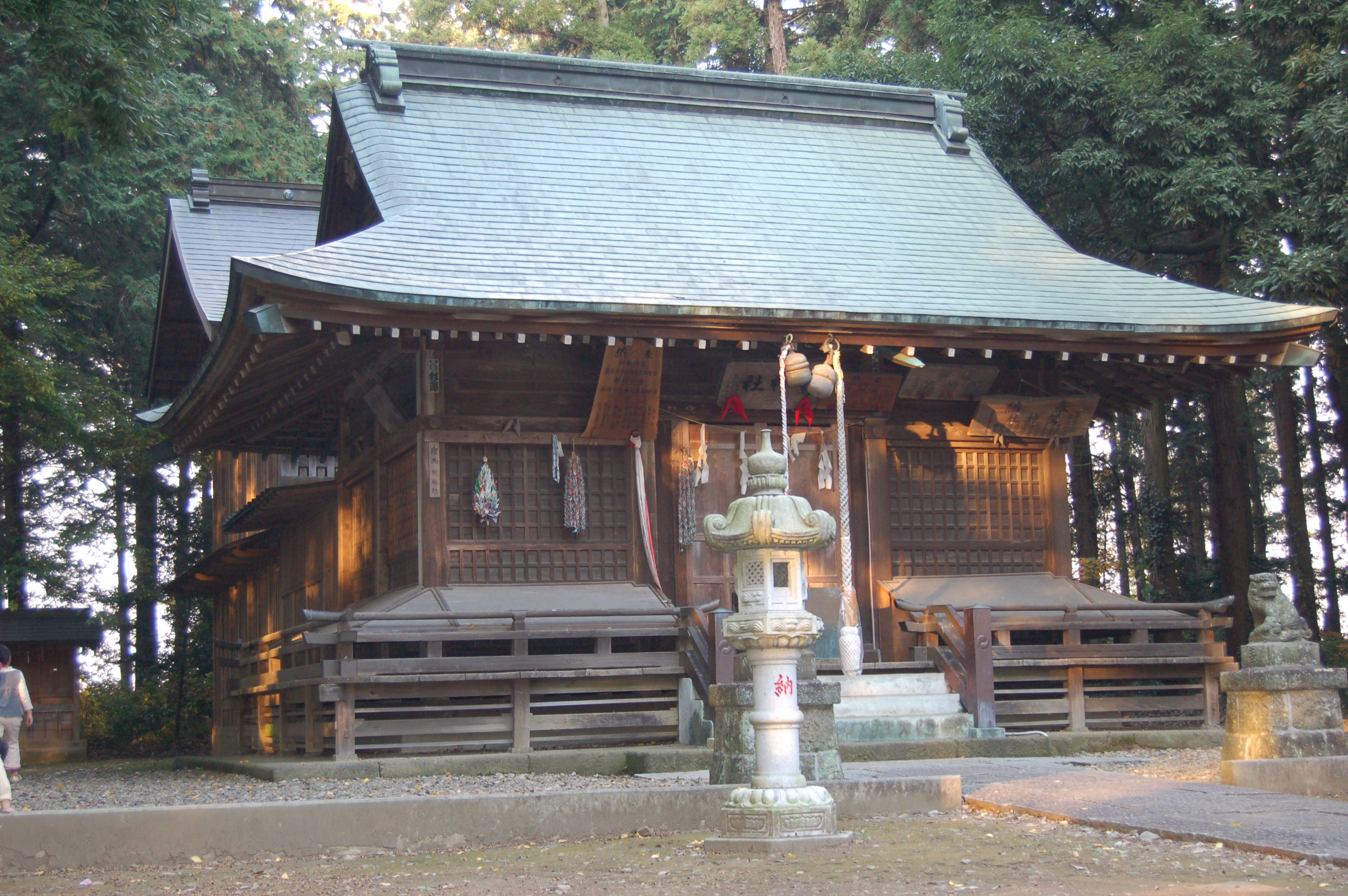
Washi Jinja on the site of Washi Castle

Oyama Castle (小山城, Oyama-jō) was a Japanese castle located in what is now the city of Oyama, Tochigi Prefecture, in the Kantō region of Japan. In 1991 the ruins were proclaimed a National Historic Site by the Japanese government collectively with Nakakuki Castle and Washi Castle as the "Oyama clan castle ruins". The castle is also known as Gion Castle (祇園城, Gion-jō)

== Oyama Castle (Gion Castle) ==
Oyama Castle was built by Oyama Masamitsu in 1148. The Oyama clan claimed descent from Fujiwara Hidesato and had territories in Musashi Province. During the Kamakura period, they held Yūki Castle in Shimōsa Province and were named shugo of Shimotsuke Province under the Kamakura shogunate. However, after the fall of the Kamakura shogunate, their position as shugo was challenged by the Utsunomiya clan, the Kō clan and the Kantō kanreiUesugi clan. Initially, the Oyama clan used Washi Castle as their seat, but relocated to the more defensible Oyama Castle during the time of Oyama Yoshimasa. It was the site of numerous conflicts from 1380 to 1383. The Oyama clan was eventually defeated and annihilated by the Kamakura-fu, but the clan name was permitted to continue as a cadet branch of the Yūki clan into the Sengoku period. Oyama Hidetsuna was forced to pledge fealty to the Late Hōjō clan in 1576, and the castle was expanded by Hōjō Ujiteru and became a base of operations for the Hōjō conquest of the northern Kantō region. However, when the Hōjō were destroyed by Toyotomi Hideyoshi in 1590, the Oyama were dispossessed and the castle given to Honda Masazumi as the center of a 30,000 koku fief. When Honda Masazumi was transferred by the Tokugawa Shogunate to Utsunomiya Castle in 1619, Oyama Castle was abandoned.

During the Meiji period, the politician and cabinet minister Hoshi Tōru built a villa on the ruins of the castle, but this villa no longer exists. The site of the castle is now called Shiroyama Park. The castle was a flatland-stye castle with the Shikawa River forming a huge natural moat to one side. It consisted of three large enclosures in a row along the river, each separated by a deep moat and earthworks over an area of about 400 meters east–west and about 700 meters north–south. Immediately to the south was a square, double-moated enclosure, which was the location of the Oyama residence. Most of the outer areas of the castle have been lost due to modern urban encroachment.

== Washi Castle ==
Washi Castle (鷲城, Washi-jō) (36°18′16.2″N 139°47′5.3″E) was the earlier seat of the Oyama clan. It is uncertain when it was constructed, but it is likely from the time that the Oyama clan was designated as shugo of Shimotsuke Province in the Kamakura period. It became one of the five strongholds of the Oyama clan during the Muromachi period. It was abandoned around 1601 when the Oyama clan was transferred to Echizen Province by the Tokugawa shogunate. At present, the inner portion of site is partly occupied by the Washi Shrine, and the outer portion has been lost to residential lands. In 1991, it became a National Historic Site together with Oyama Castle.

== Nakakuki Caste ==
Nakakuki Castle (中久喜城, Kakakuki-jō) was located (36°18′9.2″N 139°50′9.2″E ) at the southern end of a tongue-shaped plateau just upstream of the confluence between the Egawa and Nishinirei rivers. The inner bailey measures 120 by 100 meters, and is surrounded by earthworks, with a redoubt located in the northwest at the tip of the plateau. To the east was a secondary enclosure, which is now occupied by a Buddhist temple. Nakakuki Castle was built by Oyama Masamitsu in 1155 and was another of the five strongholds of the Oyama clan in the Muromachi period. It was abandoned around 1601 when the Oyama clan was transferred to Echizen Province by the Tokugawa shogunate. At present, the tracks of the Mito Line railway cut through the site of the castle, with a railroad crossing located inside the castle grounds itself, making the site difficult to understand. In 1991, it received protection as a National Historic Site together with the sites of Oyama Castle and Washi Castle; however, the main enclosure was not included in the designation. This was revised in the year 2001 to include the undesignated portion of the site.

== See also ==
- List of Historic Sites of Japan (Tochigi)

== Literature ==
- De Lange, William (2021). An Encyclopedia of Japanese Castles. Groningen: Toyo Press. pp. 600 pages. ISBN 978-9492722300.
- Schmorleitz, Morton S. (1974). Castles in Japan. Tokyo: Charles E. Tuttle Co. pp. 144–145. ISBN 0-8048-1102-4.
- Motoo, Hinago (1986). Japanese Castles. Tokyo: Kodansha. p. 200 pages. ISBN 0-87011-766-1.
- Mitchelhill, Jennifer (2004). Castles of the Samurai: Power and Beauty. Tokyo: Kodansha. p. 112 pages. ISBN 4-7700-2954-3.
- Turnbull, Stephen (2003). Japanese Castles 1540-1640. Osprey Publishing. p. 64 pages. ISBN 1-84176-429-9.
