= Kamikōnushi-Mobara Kanga ruins =

Ancient ruins in Utsunomiya, Kantō, Japan

Kamikōnushi・Mobara kanga ruins
- 上神主・茂原官衙遺跡 (Japanese)
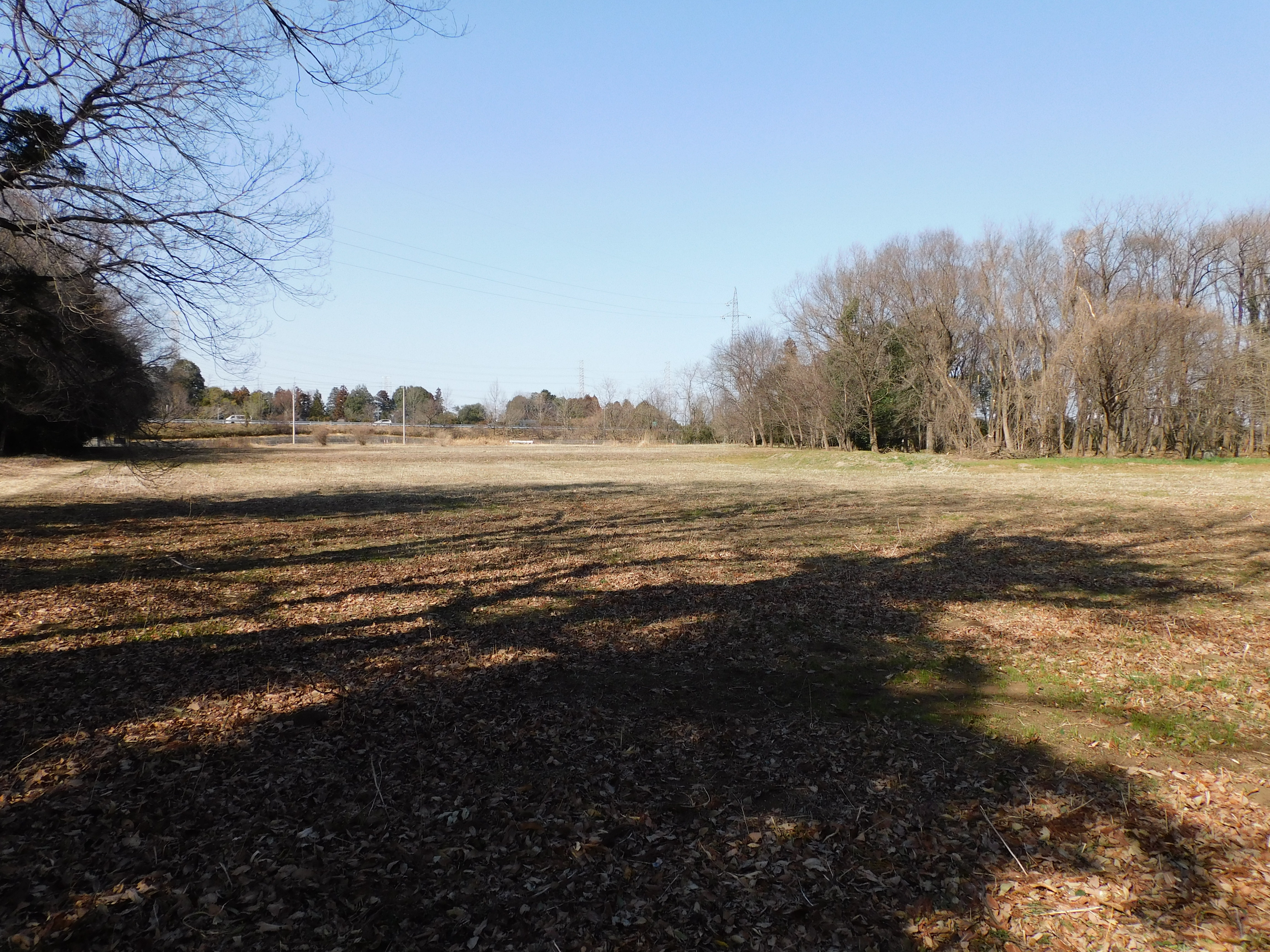
- Kamikōnushi・Mobara kanga ruins

- Kamikōnushi・Mobara kanga ruins Kamikōnushi-Mobara Kanga ruins (Japan)
- 36°27′54″N 139°53′01″E
- Periods: Nara - Heian period
- Location: Kaminokawa/ Utsunomiya, Japan
- Region: Tōhoku region

History
- Built: 8th century AD
- Abandoned: 10th century AD

Site notes
- Public access: No

The Kamikōnushi・Mobara kanga ruins (上神主・茂原官衙遺跡, Kamikōnushi・Mobara kanga iseki) is an archaeological site with the ruins of a Nara to Heian period government administrative complex located in what is now on the border of the town of Kaminokawa, with the city of Utsunomiya in Tochigi prefecture in the northern Kantō region of Japan. It has been protected as a National Historic Site from 2003. The Kita-Kantō Expressway cuts directly across the site.

== Overview ==
In the late Nara period, after the establishment of a centralized government under the Ritsuryō system, local rule over the provinces was standardized under a kokufu (provincial capital), and each province was divided into smaller administrative districts, known as (郡, gun, kōri), composed of 2–20 townships in 715 AD.

This ruin has long been believed to have been the ruins of an unknown Buddhist temple because of the many shards of roof tiles which have been unearthed. Since 1995, excavations were Kamimikawa Town and Utsunomiya City, in conjunction with the construction of the Kita-Kanto Expressway on the north side of the site, and as a result it was found that the ruins were that of a government complex and no a temple.

The Kamikōnushi・Mobara ruins consist of the remnants of a rectangular enclosure, approximately 250 meters east–west by 390 meters north–south, with remnants of a moat with a width of 3 to 4 meters on the west and south sides. The entire enclosure was presumably completely surrounded by a moat and earthen rampart, which was presumably surmounted by a wooden palisade, but these traces have not yet been confirmed. The site is located around 80 meters above the edge of a plateau facing the flood plain of the Tagawa River. The interior of the enclosure is divided into three areas, the government office area in the center with the elevated foundation bases of large buildings in a "U-shape" arrangement, and a warehouse area for storing tax rice, in the south, containing the foundations of over 30 raised-floor granaries. This arrangement was common to Nara and Heian period county administrative complexes in other parts of the country. However, an unusual find was over 1300 tiles inscribed with the names of people, which date from the middle of the 8th century.

Remnants of the ancient Tōsandō highway which connected central and northern Japan with the Kansai area were also found adjacent to the ruins, and the main entrance to the government complex appears to have been facing the highway.

The ruins were backfilled after excavation, and are now an empty field. The site is located about 5 minutes by car from Ishibashi Station on the JR East Tōhoku Main Line.

== See also ==
- List of Historic Sites of Japan (Tochigi)
