= Sanuki Stone Buddha =

Japanese historic site

Sanuki Sekibutsu
- 佐貫石仏 (Japanese)
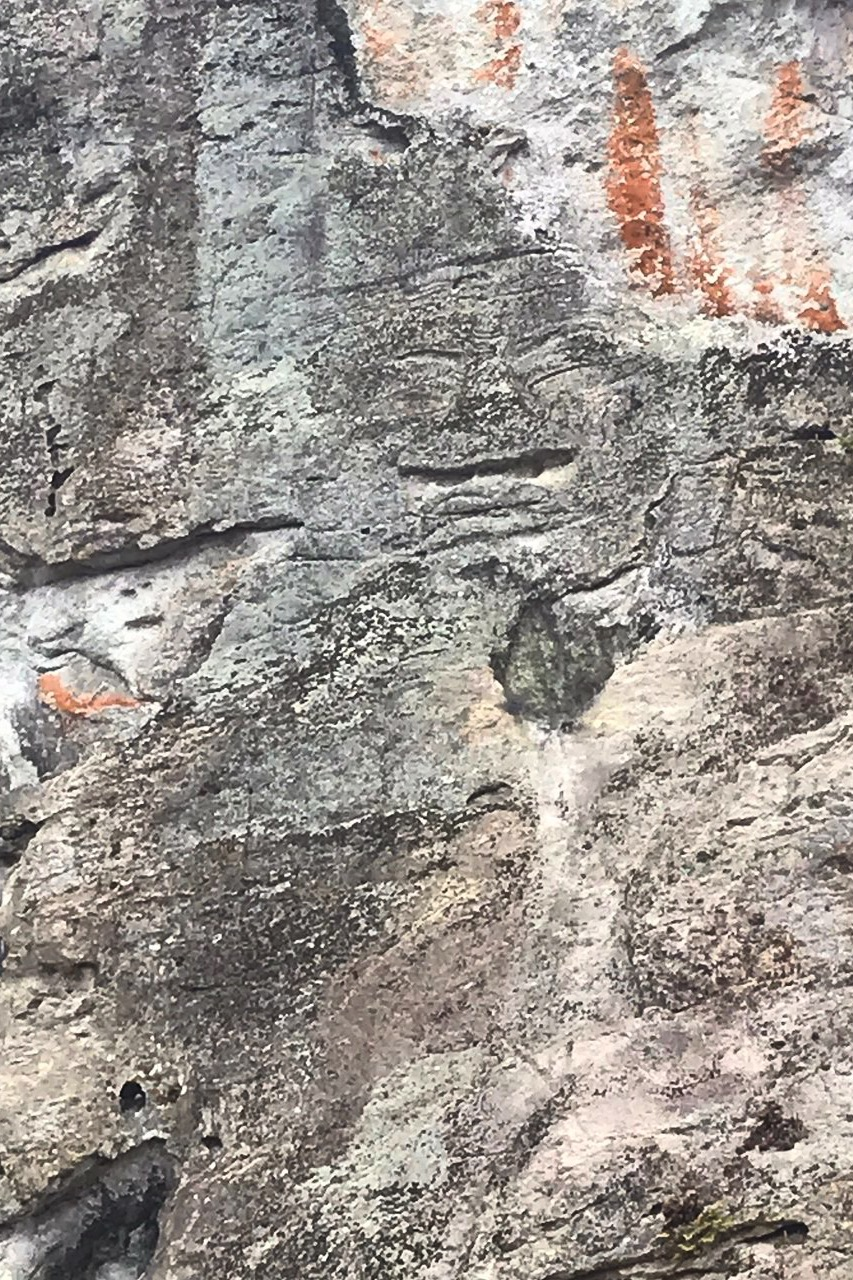
- Sanuki Sekibutsu

- Sanuki Sekibutsu Sanuki Stone Buddha (Japan)
- 36°45′00.8″N 139°48′00.8″E
- Location: Shioya, Tochigi, Japan
- Region: Kantō region

Site notes
- Public access: Yes

The Sanuki Sekibutsu (佐貫石仏) is an outline carving of Dainichi Nyorai of unknown origin located in the town of Shioya, Tochigi Prefecture, in the northern Kantō region of Japan. It was designated a National Historic Site of Japan in 1926.

== Overview ==
The carving is an outline of a seated Buddha engraved on a sheer rock wall of quartz trachyte on the left bank of the upper stream of the Kinu River. The engraving has a height of 18.2 meters from the top of the crown to the lower end of the lotus throne, the face length is about 3 meters and a width of about 1.6 meters. The lotus seat is depicted with eight leaves. The carving is faint and partially obliterated due to long-term weathering, erosion, and moss adhesion, but the thickness of the engraved line is about 4.5 to 6.1 centimeters.

There are various theories as to when this carving was created, ranging from the Nara period, Heian period and Kamakura period. From its style, art historians tend to lean towards the late Heian to early Kamakura hypothesis; however, per local folklore, the image was carved in one night by the famous Kōbō Daishi in 807 AD at the request of Fujiwara no Tomitada, a nobleman who was governor of Sanuki Province in Shikoku, shortly after Kōbō Daishi's return from Tang dynasty China. There is no documentary evidence to back up any of these theories.

The mountain on which the image is carved is called the Kannon-iwa (観音岩) and contains a cave with a statue of Kannon Bosatsu, which was once part of a Buddhist temple complex. However, the temple was destroyed after the Meiji restoration and the carving was abandoned. The cave-temple was opened in 2015 for the first time in 136 years.

The site can be reached by bus from Utsunomiya Station on the Tohoku Shinkansen.

== See also ==
- List of Historic Sites of Japan (Tochigi)
