= Progress Theatre =

Local theatre company in Reading, England

Coordinates: 51°26′39.9″N 0°57′28.12″W

- Formation: 1946
- Type: Theatre and Registered charity
- Location: Reading, England
- Members: 150+
- Chair: Stephanie Dewar
- Website: www.progresstheatre.co.uk

Progress Theatre is a local theatre company at Reading in England. It is a registered charity and it is a member of the Little Theatre Guild (LTG) and the National Operatic and Dramatic Association (NODA).

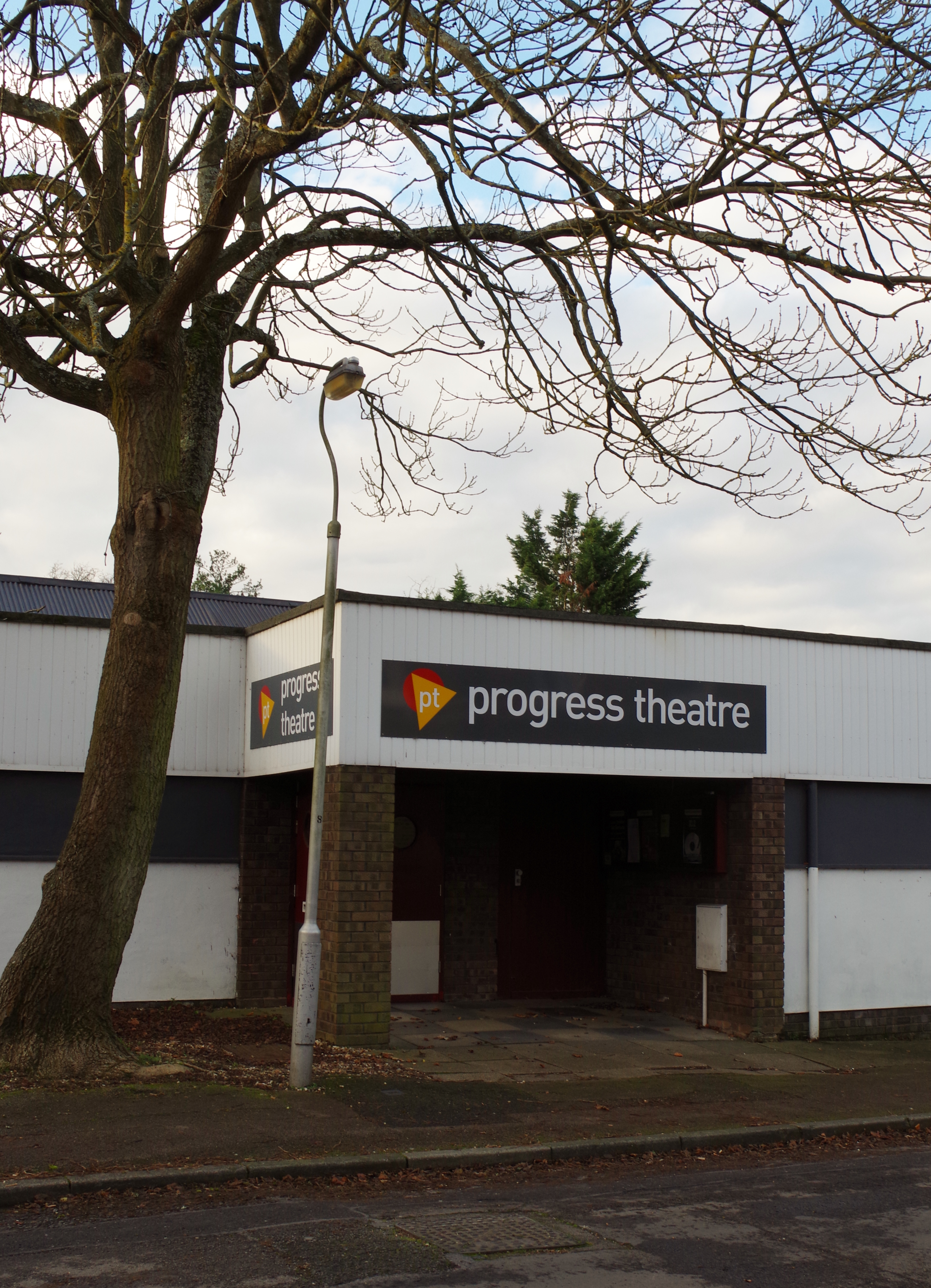
Progress Theatre, 2014

== History ==
Progress Theatre was established in 1946 with the aim of presenting new and challenging work.

Its first production was staged in 1947 in Palmer Hall, West Street, Reading. It moved to its present location, The Mildmay Hall, The Mount (near Reading University) in 1951.

In 1964, after a fund raising campaign, the freehold of the building was bought. After modernisation, the theatre now seats 97 people.

Kenneth Branagh, who was a member of the theatre in the late 1970s, became Progress Theatre patron in 2011.

== Educational role ==
In the 1950s a Student Group for 14- to 18-year-olds was set up. A charitable organisation, "The Progress Theatre" was established in 1962 with the object of promoting education in performing arts in Reading and the surrounding area. Since 2009, the Progress Youth Theatre consists of two groups for 15- to 18-year-olds and groups for school years 4 to 6 (ages 8 to 11), 7 to 8 (ages 11 to 13) and 9 to 10 (ages 13 to 15). The groups give a public performance each year.

== Present day ==
The theatre has a membership of around 150 people and puts on a regular menu of classic and contemporary theatre. All of these productions are managed by volunteers.

The theatre also stages a summer open-air event, predominantly a Shakespeare play, at the historic and newly renovated ruins of Reading Abbey. These productions are managed in partnership with Reading Borough Council. In 2007, the event was expanded to form the Reading Abbey Ruins Open Air Festival. Due to the ongoing restoration of the abbey, in 2011 the event temporarily moved to the gardens of Caversham Court, the site of a Tudor manor house on the banks of the River Thames. However, it returned to Reading Abbey Ruins in 2018, following the completion of the renovations, and continued to perform from this beautiful location.

== Past productions ==
Progress has presented contemporary plays since its founding and the first performances in England of The Good Woman of Setzuan by Bertolt Brecht and The Shadow of a Gunman by Seán O'Casey were produced at the theatre in 1952 and 1958 respectively.

More recently, Progress has produced a series of Christmas shows based on popular children's books including:

- Mort by Terry Pratchett (adap. Stephen Briggs) in 1997–1998
- James and the Giant Peach by Roald Dahl in 2005–2006, using an adaptation by David Wood usually available only to professional productions.

Recent years have also seen productions of notorious plays such as Blasted by Sarah Kane, while the yearly open-air Shakespeare season continues to prove popular.

== Past seasons ==
Productions during the 2005–2006 season
Play	Author	Dates	Reviews
The Woman Who Cooked Her Husband	Debbie Isitt	3 to 8 October 2005	Theatre archive
Godspell	John-Michael Tebelak / Stephen Schwartz	10 to 19 November 2005	Theatre archive
James and the Giant Peach	Roald Dahl (adapted by David Wood)	29 December 2005 to 7 January 2006	Theatre archive
Breaking the Code	Hugh Whitemore	9 to 18 February 2006	
Julius Caesar	William Shakespeare	1 to 4 March 2006	
Blasted	Sarah Kane	20 to 25 March 2006	BBC Review
In the Village / HotChitChat.com (double bill)	Mary Took / Arthur Burke (local writers)	24 to 29 April 2006	
Skylight	David Hare	1 to 10 June 2006	
Dracula (a Progress Youth Theatre production)	Bram Stoker (adapted by Glynn Oram, a local writer)	11 to 15 July 2006	BBC Review
The Winter's Tale (performed in the Reading Abbey Ruins)	William Shakespeare	17 to 29 July 2006	

Productions during the 2006–2007 season
Play	Author	Dates	Reviews
Entertaining Mr Sloane	Joe Orton	7 to 16 September 2006	Newbury Weekly News
Hanna and Hannah	John Retallack	9 to 14 October 2006	Newbury Weekly News
The Good Woman of Setzuan	Bertolt Brecht	16 to 25 November 2006	BBC
Alice in Storyland	Ali Carroll (local writer)	28 December 2006 to 6 January 2007	
First Writefest^{a}	A festival of new writing	22 to 27 January 2007	
Wait Until Dark	Frederick Knott	22 February to 3 March 2007	Newbury Weekly News
The Far Side (performed at 21 South Street)	Courttia Newland	12 to 15 March 2007	BBC
The Insect Play (a Progress Youth Theatre production)	Josef and Karel Čapek	26 to 31 March 2007	
Grey Owl (a visiting production by Progress Theatre (Canada))	Armand Garnet Ruffo	10 to 11 April 2007	
Decadence / People in Cages (double bill)	Steven Berkoff / David Henry Wilson	16 to 21 April 2007	BBC
The Husband Defeated	Molière	10 to 19 May 2007	
A Midsummer Night's Dream (performed in the Reading Abbey Ruins)	William Shakespeare	16 to 28 July 2007	BBC Reading Evening Post

Productions during the 2007–2008 season
Play	Author	Dates	(P)reviews
Woman in Mind	Alan Ayckbourn	20 to 29 September 2007	BBC Preview BBC Review
The Veil	Kerry Murdock	22 to 27 October 2007	BBC Preview BBC Review Remotegoat Review
My Voice(s)^{a}	Kerry Murdock	3 November 2007	BBC Review
Blue/Orange	Joe Penhall	19 to 24 November 2007	BBC Review Newbury Weekly News Lentissimo article Production Photos
The Jungle Book	Rudyard Kipling, adapted by Stuart Paterson	28 December 2007 to 6 January 2008	BBC Preview BBC Review
Second Writefest	A festival of new writing	17 to 19 January 2008	BBC preview Remotegoat review
Return to the Forbidden Planet	Bob Carlton	14 to 23 February 2008	Newbury Theatre review
After Juliet (a Progress Youth Theatre production)	Sharman Macdonald	10 to 15 March 2008	BBC Review Remotegoat review
Four Nights in Knaresborough	Paul Webb	10 to 19 April 2008	Reading Evening Post review Remote goat review Newbury Weekly News review
The Women of Lockerbie	Deborah Brevoort	19 to 24 May 2008	Newbury Weekly News review
The Taming of the Shrew (performed in the Reading Abbey Ruins)	William Shakespeare	14 to 26 July 2008	Reading Evening Post preview

Productions during the 2008–2009 season
Play	Author	Dates	(P)reviews
Honour	Joanna Murray-Smith	22 to 27 September 2008	Reading Evening Post review
Kindertransport	Diane Samuels	27 October to 1 November 2008	Reading Evening Post review Newbury Weekly News Review
The Tamer Tamed	John Fletcher	20 to 29 November 2008	Reading Evening Post review
Five Children and It	E. Nesbit, adapted by Ali Carroll	29 December 2008 to 10 January 2009	Reading Evening Post review Newbury Weekly News Review
Third Write Fest	A festival of new writing	29 to 31 January 2009	Reading Evening Post preview
Fear and Misery of the Third Reich	Bertolt Brecht	5 to 14 March 2009	Reading Evening Post review
Macbeth (a Progress Youth Theatre production)	William Shakespeare	30 March to 4 April	Reading Evening Post review
Entrapment	Nicola Abraham	16 to 18 April 2009	
Popcorn	Ben Elton	7 to 16 May 2009	Reading Evening Post review
The Dianalogues	Laurel Haines	8 to 13 June 2009	

Productions during the 2009–2010 season
Play	Author	Dates	(P)reviews
Closer	Patrick Marber	28 September to 3 October 2009	
4th Annual Writefest	A festival of new writing	22 to 24 October	
Much Ado About Nothing	William Shakespeare	26 November to 5 December	
Going Postal	Terry Pratchett (adap. Stephen Briggs)	28 January to 6 February 2010	
A Couple of Poor, English-Speaking Poles	Dorota Masłowska	1 to 6 March	
The Importance of Being Earnest and Travesties (a Progress Youth Theatre production)	Oscar Wilde and Tom Stoppard	22 to 27 March	Get Reading review
Intimate Exchanges	Alan Ayckbourn	14 to 24 April	Get Reading preview Get Reading review
The Pillowman	Martin McDonagh	20 to 29 May	
Progress Youth Theatre production		14 to 19 June	
Death and the Maiden	Ariel Dorfman	5 to 10 July	

== Famous members ==
- Sir Kenneth Branagh made his earliest theatre appearances with Progress Theatre in the 1970s, including one minor role as "second policeman" and is the theatre's patron.
- Dame Judi Dench is currently the patron of the Friends of Progress Theatre.
- Marianne Faithfull, a pop singer and actress, was a member of the Theatre's Student Group in the early 1960s.
- Gerard Johnson, a British keyboard player, was also a member of the Theatre's Student Group between 1976 and 1981.
- Peter Strickland, director and screenwriter of Berberian Sound Studio.
- Elize du Toit, an actress who has appeared in Hollyoaks and Skyfall.
- Brendan Patricks, a London-based magician and actor from Downton Abbey.

== Notes ==
A. My Voice(s), a piece of new writing featured in the First Write Fest, was subsequently developed and performed at the 2007 Edinburgh Festival Fringe.
