= Hooray for Spring! (Iwamura book) =

1988 picture book by Kazuo Iwamura

Hooray for Spring! (もりのあかちゃん, Mori no Akachan; Forest Baby) is a children's picture book made by Kazuo Iwamura. The original Japanese book was published in 1988 by Shiko-sha (至光社). The English version was published in 2009 by North South Books.

Three squirrel siblings, named Mack, Mick, and Molly (the names in Japanese are Paro (ぱろ), Piko (ぴこ), and Poro (ぽろ)) try to feed a baby bird.

A new edition of the English version came out in 2023.

The author used inks and watercolors for the visuals. The colors used involve light pinks and greens.

== Reception ==
Kirkus Reviews wrote that the work is "a sweet seasonal diversion" and that the artwork shows "gentle humor"; the magazine described the ending as "something of a soft thud".

Linda Ludke of the London Public Library in Canada stated that the work is "a gentle springtime tale" and that the main characters have a "sweet-natured lack of guile".

Shelle Rosenfeld, in Booklist, praised the "upbeat" story, stating that it had "lively dialogue".

In 2022 Kimberly Olson Fakih, in School Library Journal, wrote that the book "has not aged a bit".

== See also ==
- Seven Little Mice Go to School - A 1981 children's book illustrated by Iwamura.
- Bedtime in the Forest - A 1982 children's book illustrated by Iwamura.
- Hooray for Snow! - A 1983 children's book illustrated by Iwamura.
- Hooray for Summer! - A 1986 children's book illustrated by Iwamura.
