= Nasu Kanga ruins =

- 那須官衙遺跡 (Japanese)
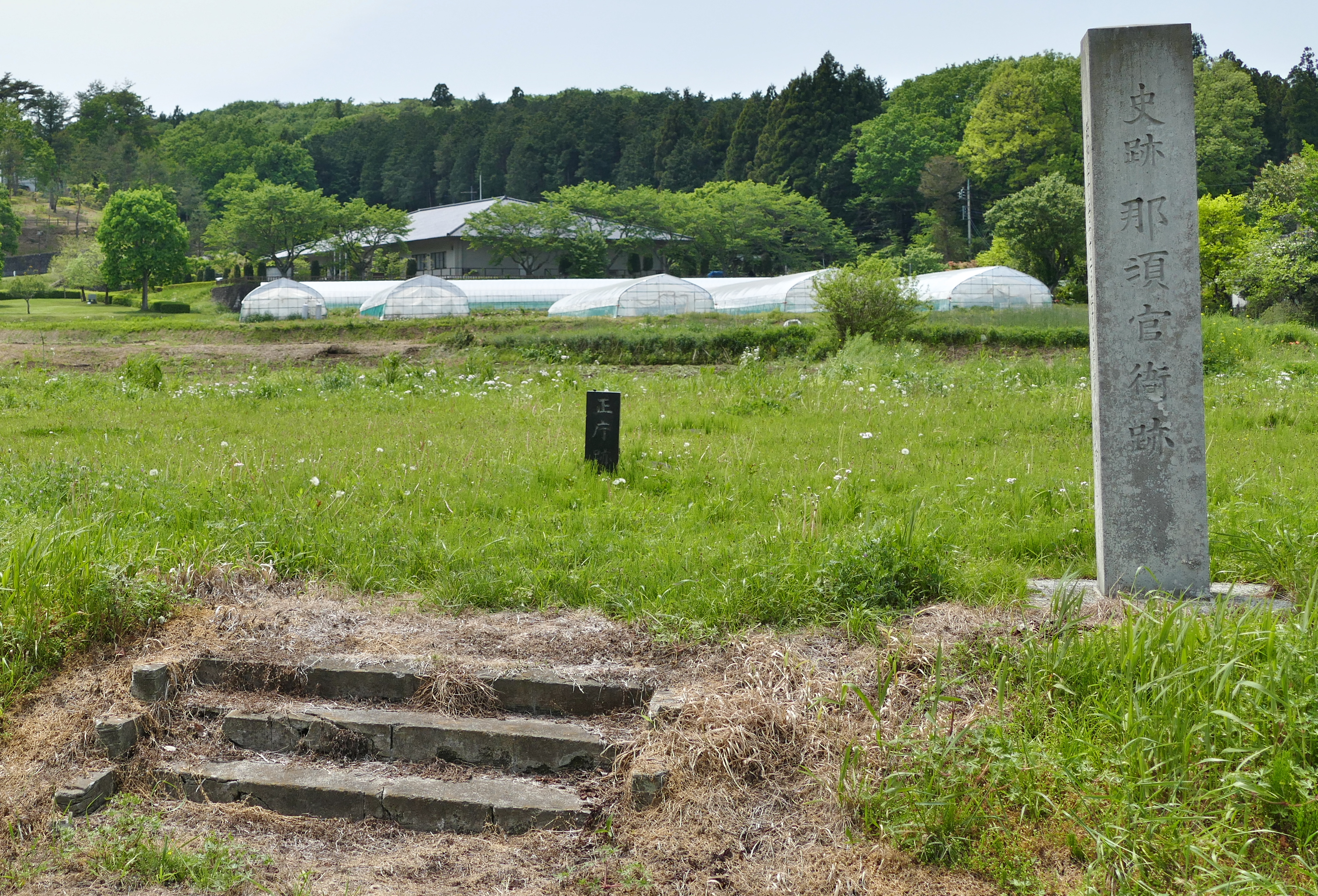

- Nasu Kanga ruins Nasu Kanga ruins (Japan)
- 36°46′52″N 140°06′35″E
- Periods: Nara - Heian period
- Location: Nakagawa, Tochigi, Japan
- Region: Tōhoku region

History
- Built: 8th century AD

Site notes
- Public access: Yes (museum on site)

The Nasu Kanga ruins (那須官衙遺跡, Nasu Kanga iseki) is an archaeological site with the ruins of a Heian period government administrative complex located in what is now part of the town of Nakagawa, Tochigi prefecture in the northern Kantō region of Japan. It has been protected as a National Historic Site from 1976.

== Background ==
In the late Nara period, after the establishment of a centralized government under the Ritsuryō system, local rule over the provinces was standardized under a kokufu (provincial capital), and each province was divided into smaller administrative districts, known as (郡, gun, kōri), composed of 2–20 townships in 715 AD. Each of the districts had an administrative complex built on a semi-standardized layout based on contemporary Chinese design, and ancient Shimotsuke Province was divided into nine such districts. Whereas, as the governor (kokushi), was an official dispatched from the central government on temporary assignment, the district rulers (gunji) were typically hereditary local chieftains or nobility.

The Nasu Kanga site is believed to have been the location of the civil administration of Nasu District from the Nara period. Nasu District (那須郡) is mentioned in connection with the semi-legendary Emperor Keikō in the Kojiki and Nihon Shoki, and during the Asuka period was a separate province ruled by the Nasu no miyatsuko. Nasu Province merged with Shimotsukeno-no-kuni (下毛野国) in 689 AD, and the joined province was subsequently named "Shimotsuke". The area where the ruins are located has a dense concentration of kofun tumuli, include the Samuraizuka Kofun and the Nasu Ogawa Kofun Cluster.

== Description ==
The ruins are located at the end of the Kitsuregawa hills on the left bank of the Bokigawa, a tributary of the Naka River. Traditionally, the site was referred to as the "Umizo temple ruins" as old roof tiles had often been unearthed in the vicinity. However, per a survey conducted from 1967 the remnants of a rectangular enclosure, approximately 600 meters east-to-west by 200 meters north-to-south, with remnants of a moat and earthen rampart, presumably surmounted by a wooden palisade. Inside the enclosure, there were the elevated foundation bases of a large building and many warehouse structures, presumably for storing tax rice. This arrangement was common to Nara period and Heian period county administrative complexes in other parts of the country. The construction time is estimated to be the Nara period based on dating of the excavated roof tiles. Artifacts found at the site are displayed at the adjacent Tochigi Prefectural Nasu Fudoki no Oka Museum. The site is about 30 minutes by car from Nishi-Nasuno Station on the JR East Tohoku Main Line.

== See also ==
- List of Historic Sites of Japan (Tochigi)
