= Społeczeństwo jest niemiłe =

2014 album by Polish writer Dorota Masłowska

Studio album by Dorota Masłowska
- Released: 22 February 2014
- Recorded: 2013–2014, Warsaw
- Genres: Hip-hop; punk rock; dance
- Length: 34:00
- Label: Raster Gallery
- Producer: Szymon Żydek

Społeczeństwo jest niemiłe (Society Is Mean) is the debut album by Polish writer Dorota Masłowska, released in 2014 under the pseudonym Mister D. Masłowska intended the album as a creative break from literature, believing that music would better suit her satirical take on Polish society. Recorded in her apartment over six months with professional musicians, the album combines rap, punk, and dance music, marked by a campy, amateur vocal style. Its lyrics critique issues such as gender inequality (including within hip-hop), celebrity culture, consumerism, and traditionalism, often referencing 1990s pop culture and stereotypical Polish aspirations. Eight tracks received music videos, and in November, she separately released the song "Tęcza" ("Rainbow") as a critique of Polish nationalism. Masłowska performed over 20 concerts before pausing her music career in November 2015.

Upon release, the album received mixed or negative reviews, criticized for pretentiousness, amateurism, and kitschy lyrics. However, year-end retrospectives and later analyses praised its humor, style, and perceptive critique of Polish society at the close of the post-communist transition era.

== Creation and release of the album ==
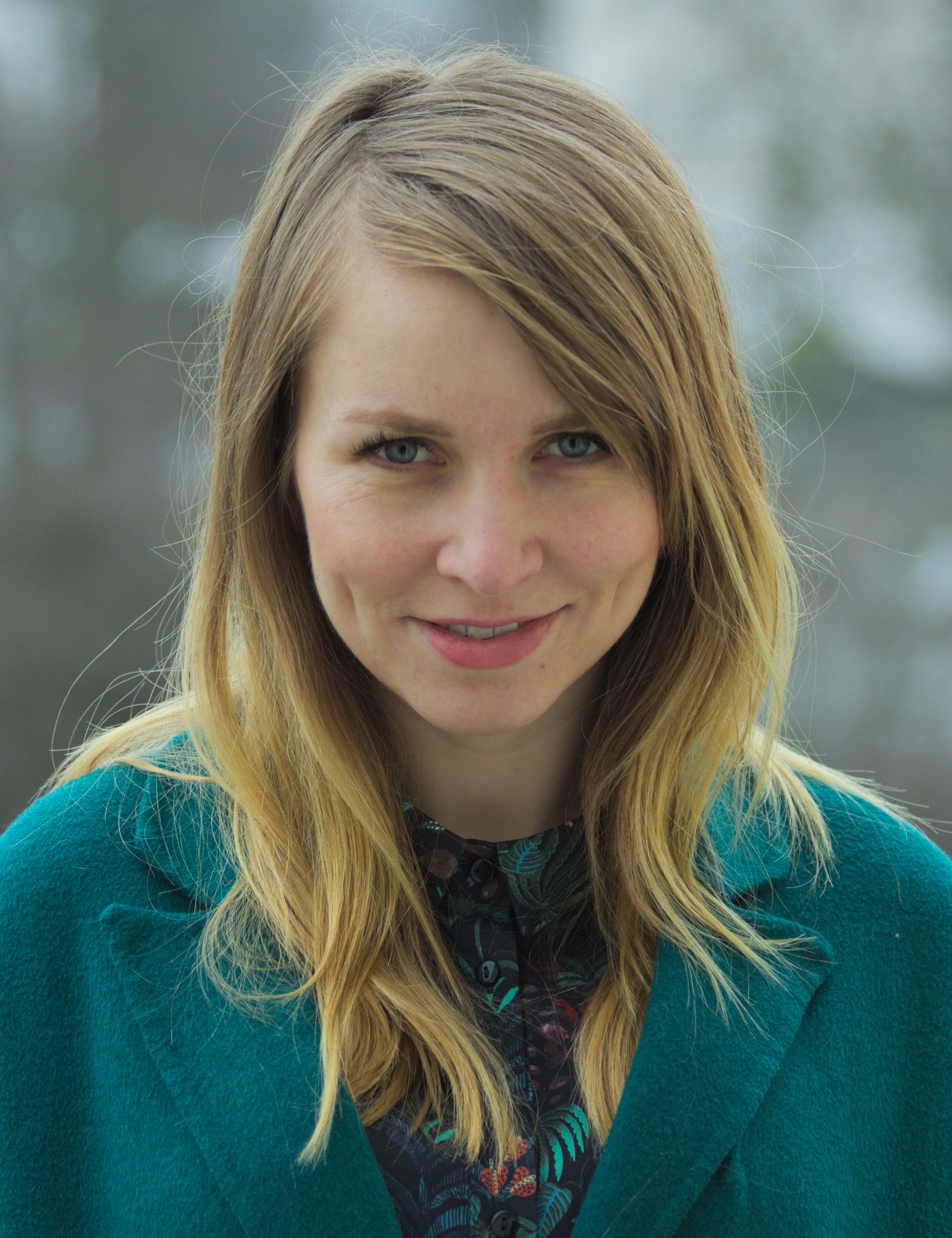
Dorota Masłowska

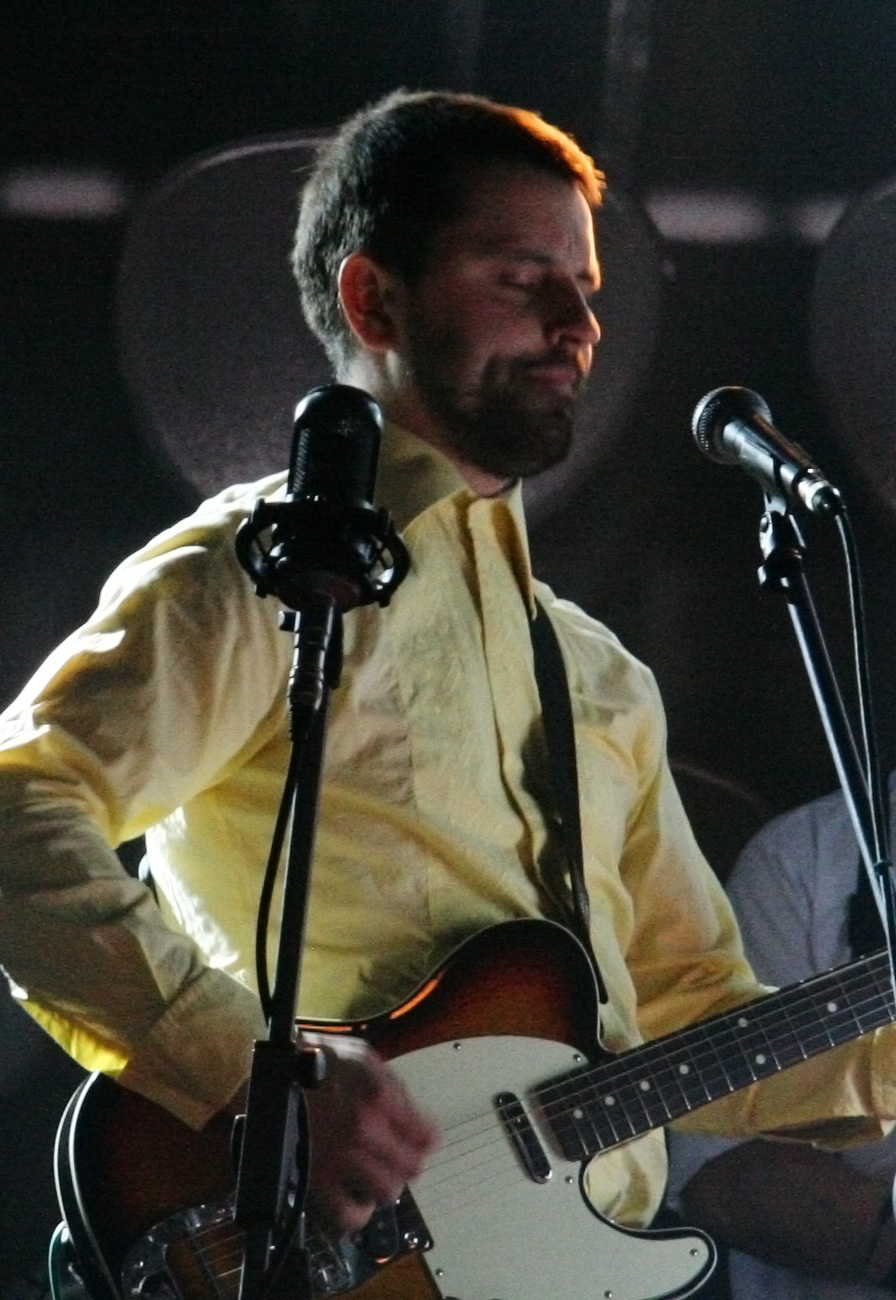
Marcin Macuk

Masłowska's motivation for creating the album was her fatigue with literature as a field and the need to dedicate herself to a new form, which turned out to be music. The writer wanted to express her opinion on social issues but did not want to do so through engaged literature, which she is reluctant toward: "The album also came from my longing for songs with which I could identify (...). It was about taking a risk and tackling a new form, creating a new form, although more difficult to perceive and imperfect, to speak on social issues". The idea of the pseudonym, a male alter ego for the writer, originated from a 2006 photo session by Igor Omulecki, during which Masłowska also posed as a man. The album was promoted with the slogan "Sex, money, problems, contempt".

Masłowska wrote both the lyrics and the music for the album. During the creative process, she was supported by professional musicians Marcin Macuk and Jakub Wandachowicz. She had the chance to collaborate with Wandachowicz in 2003, when Masłowska guest-performed on the songs "Słyszałeś" ("You Heard") and "Świat wylazł z foremki" ("The World Came Out of the Mold") from the album Cool Kids of Death. The album was recorded for six months in Masłowska's apartment, where a professional microphone was installed. It was released on 22 February 2014. Its release was accompanied by an exhibition of the same title at the Raster Gallery. The works presented there (also by Honorata Martin, Dominika Olszowy, and Maria Toboła) concerned the "confrontation with Polish society and Poland in general". A limited edition of the album was released in the Rasters Edition collector's series, featuring graphic design by Jacek Kołodziejski. Instead of a standard case, the album was encased in a signed folder with photographs. The edition had 100 signed copies.

The entire artistic project Społeczeństwo jest niemiłe, besides the album, included concerts, photo sessions, and costumes. Additionally, the album was promoted with music videos for eight songs: "Chleb" ("Bread", 2014), "Hajs" ("Cash", 2014), "Prezydent" ("President", 2014), "Czarna żorżeta" ("Black Georgette", 2014), "Ryszard" (2014), "Społeczeństwo jest niemiłe" ("The Society Is Mean", 2015), "Zapach Boga" ("The Scent of God", 2015), and "Żona piłkarza" ("Wife of a Footballer", 2016). Each video was directed by a different person but shared many common elements.

In connection with the album release, Masłowska also created a fan page on Facebook. She had previously not had profiles on social media (either private or public), which she had mentioned several times in interviews. The fan page was run in a spirit of pastiche, with posts written in the "carefree, party-like poetry of commercial music band pages", and absurd contests were also announced. This style was picked up by commenters. By appropriating typical elements of such aesthetics, Masłowska highlighted the banality of their content and the internet's influence on their decontextualization. The page stopped being updated on 1 April 2016, after the premiere of the "Żona piłkarza" video.

== Cover art ==
The album cover introduces a new, hip-hop persona for Masłowska – an eye-catching car, a fur coat, and large dogs (American Staffordshire Terriers). It creates a parodic dynamic, laying the foundation for the work. However, the depiction of the vehicle as a chariot being pulled by dogs on chains deviates from the typical image of a rapper. According to Alena Aniskiewicz, the placement of not one, but three dogs is a wink to the audience – Masłowska plays a rapper, but on a larger scale and not entirely correctly. She undermines the symbolic meaning of Pit Bull Terriers in American hip-hop, as dogs reflecting "street" sensitivity and male aggression.

== Interpretation of song lyrics and music videos ==
In the lyrics, Masłowska tackles themes such as gender inequality, celebrity culture, consumerism, and everyday life. The songs can be divided into two main groups. The first deals with the objectification of women (all of the women in the songs are unnamed) and the passivity and infantilism of men ("Ryszard", "Prezydent", "Żona piłkarza", "Czarna żorżeta", "Córka" ("Daughter"), "Społeczeństwo jest niemiłe"). The second focuses on globalization, consumerism, and disillusionment with capitalism ("Hajs", "Chleb", "Chrzciny" ("Christenings"), "Kinga", "Zapach Boga").

Masłowska often uses allegories in the music videos as a vehicle for expressing opinions on social issues and the political situation in Poland. According to Folta-Rusin, she presents the "flaws" of Polish society by using specific character types, attributes, clothing, and environments. She often deliberately anachronizes, drawing on attributes from the 1990s and the era of the Polish People's Republic rather than from modern times. The individual visuals do not serve as illustrations of the lyrics but instead create autonomous meanings. The entire work is intended to be understood either as a parable of the fate of a specific type of character in Polish society or as a representation of a national flaw.

According to Sierzputowski's interpretation, the image of the album forms a broader picture of Poland in the 21st century, particularly the influence of capitalism – a country of great dreams and small possibilities, which leads to aggression and frustration directed toward other Poles, but especially symbolic Others.

=== "Ryszard" ===
Opening the album, "Ryszard" mocks the Polish "high life", similar to "Kinga" and "Żona piłkarza". The song ironically portrays the relationship between the 60-year-old left-wing politician Ryszard Kalisz and a woman in her twenties, referencing real-life events of the politician known for his relationships with younger women. The track omits Kalisz's figure, instead focusing on the woman who has to face her lack of agency and objectification by her partner and friends, who try to dissuade her from the relationship by labeling him as a "commie/fat old man". Masłowska exposes this mindset, suggesting that love could also exist in such a relationship. The music video, directed by Aneta Grzeszykowska, features a naked woman painted white (imitating an ancient statue) lying on a red floor. Someone moves her body, then ties black ribbons around her heart, which move above her body like a roulette wheel, symbolizing her lack of independence. The positioning of her body echoes that of a crucified Christ, but in conjunction with the red background, it also resembles the Polish flag. According to Folta-Rusin, this draws on the allegorical depictions of Poland by Stanisław Wyspiański, Jan Styka, and Artur Grottger.

=== "Hajs" ===
In "Hajs" ("Cash", sometimes stylized as "Haj$"), the lyrical subject is a high school girl, a representative of the consumer society, growing up during the period of social transformation, dreaming of a better life, which is shaped by mass media and societal pressures, where money is seen as a symbol of success. Her goal is not only to satisfy the material needs typical of the stereotypical Polish person (vacations in Egypt or the Canary Islands, referencing the pseudo-documentary Pamiętniki z wakacji) and the "dresiarz" subculture ("an Audi yoked to hungry Amstaffs"), but also to provoke envy within her peer group – expressed in the song through "sandwiches with cash", symbolizing a higher social status than students eating regular sandwiches with sausage and butter. In another interpretation, the sandwiches represent a mix of consumer whims and pre-capitalist habits.

"Hajs" was the first track from the album promoted with a music video. Directed by Krzysztof Skonieczny, the video is a vibrant collage of scenes where the protagonist imagines herself as a gangster's girlfriend. Masłowska (styled as a schoolgirl, rapper with jewelry, woman in a provocative swimsuit, and basketball player) dances against a green screen, rides in a golden Fiat 126 pulled by Amstaffs, and flies on a carpet shaped like a tiger's skin. The campy clip is styled like a 90s homemade computer graphic. Masłowska draws on popular culture from the 1980s, 1990s, and early 2000s: computer games, Game Boys, tin soldiers, My Little Pony, roller skates, Soviet cartoons, cassette tapes, and Polaroid cameras. References to contemporary society's obsession with consumerism are recurring themes in her other works (e.g., the novel Jak zostałam wiedźmą [How I Became a Witch]). The music video also promoted Skonieczny's feature film Hardkor Disko. In 2016, the video was included in the Bogactwo exhibition at the Zachęta Gallery.

=== "Chleb" ===
"Chleb" ("Bread") is one of the constant motifs in Masłowska's work, alongside war. The song is a central piece of the album, depicting the dreams and fears of a working-class generation disconnected from the present and suffering from nostalgia. Performed in a "street meta-language", it's seen from the perspective of a young girl living in a typical block neighborhood. On her way to the Żabka store, she encounters a "dresiarz" (a stereotypical Polish youth subculture member) sitting on a bench, who plays the role of the "seducer". However, the lyrics shift away from the usual "girl meets boy" narrative, focusing on a conversation about bread. The boy talks about his mother, who used to be an alcoholic but now bakes bread with her own "bread machine". When the girl falls for the boy, he tells her that his mother is terminally ill and offers to sell her the unused bread machine. The girl buys it but ends up alone with the machine, as the boy shows no interest in her or his dying mother. The girl, then, begins to bake bread, repeating the life model of the previous owner of the machine, becoming a housewife. The routine of baking bread becomes a practice that postpones thinking about death, while bread itself symbolizes immortality. Bread in the song may also symbolize femininity, motherhood, fertility, God, or even drugs.

The music video, directed by Krzysztof Skonieczny, follows Masłowska's script and features Masłowska, Maciej Nowak, Kuba Wandachowicz, and Jakub Żulczyk. The action takes place in two parallel realities: a gloomy, typical Polish block neighborhood (which represents the classic image of hip-hop reality) and a colorful dreamlike world, where the girl becomes a caricatured princess-dresiara (played by Anja Rubik) and her boyfriend a cartoonish super-dresiarz b-boy (Karol Niezwiestny). Together, they ride a giant dachshund, symbolizing their imagined ideal selves. The depiction of Poland has not changed significantly since 1989, except for elements of consumerism: ubiquitous billboards, garbage, toys, and signs of globalization (kebab stands). The society in the video is gray, disillusioned with the present, and numb. Consumption and pop culture products play an important role in their everyday lives, and aspirations mirror the priorities set by celebrities. Anja Rubik, as a top model, is used to critique the mass culture that values beautiful bodies and luxury brands. The video shows how life on the block deviates from the ideals imposed by mainstream culture. According to Anna Michalak, the imagery in the video appears inspired by Kraina Grzybów TV and the vaporwave aesthetic. Alena Aniskiewicz suggests that the collage elements in the video are akin to hip-hop sampling – borrowing and remixing familiar elements to create something new. Masłowska, through these familiar images and metaphors, exposes the artificiality behind "true love" and "real life". "Chleb" reveals authenticity as a product of interactions and the interpretation of symbols.

=== "Żona piłkarza" ===
In "Żona piłkarza" ("Wife of a Footballer"), Masłowska adopts the role of a "WAG", particularly drawing on figures like Dorota Rabczewska and Anna Lewandowska. The song addresses the theme of the infantilized and absent male. The titular footballer is portrayed as passive and uninterested in his sad and devoted wife. In the music video, created by Maria Strzelecka using stop motion animation, two male footballer dolls with balls instead of heads focus solely on watching sports on TV, completely indifferent to the three female dolls, representing wives or partners. These women, personifications of Penelope, spend their waiting time performing household chores, shopping, and attending events. The character's breasts are made of balls, symbolizing her as the husband's brand. This serves as an allegory for the woman's fate in a patriarchal society. The video won the Yach Film 2016 award for Best Animation.

=== "Kinga" ===
In "Kinga", Masłowska explores the theme of how consumption shapes popular culture and how the former is determined by the latter, a concept defined by Dominic Strinati. Kinga Rusin, a media personality and co-owner of a cosmetics brand, symbolizes the pervasive authority wielded by celebrities who often offer uninformed opinions on topics they are not experts in. Masłowska critiques the influence celebrities have on shaping the lifestyles of ordinary people, while also pointing out the lack of authenticity among these figures, who are not held accountable for their words. The media pressure of celebrities is also reflected in the monstrous portrayal of Rusin's body in the video. Masłowska later explained that the choice of Rusin as the subject of the song came from a somewhat random, out-of-context comment made by an acquaintance.

=== "Zapach Boga" ===
"Zapach Boga" ("The Scent of God") focuses on the overlapping nature of spirituality found in church visits and shopping in malls. The singer compares the scents of both places, highlighting the contrast between sacred and secular spaces. The music video by Milena Korolczuk is simple in form, beginning with an image of a box of chocolates resembling a Gothic church, which then smoothly transitions into a stained-glass window created from M&M's candy wrappers.

=== "Prezydent" ===
In "Prezydent" ("President"), Masłowska uses the infantilized figure of the head of state to symbolize the stereotypical, absent Polish father or husband. In the music video directed by Maciej Buchwald, Kazimierz Wysota plays the titular president, while Masłowska herself portrays the First Lady, an archetypical housewife who fills the somber waiting time for her husband by cooking dinner and caring for the child (played by Malina Malinowska, Masłowska's daughter). The contrast between the decor of the 1980s/1990s apartment and the modern view of Warsaw serves as a metaphor for the lack of change in Polish families and politics after 1989. Folta-Rusin also sees the video as a parody of political campaign ads. The song features a children's choir.

=== "Chrzciny" ===
"Chrzciny" ("Christening") can be seen as a thematic sequel to "Hajs". In this song, Masłowska plays a girl who convinces her boyfriend (voiced by Jakub Żulczyk) to take her to a family event – a christening. The song depicts the grotesque celebration of a family ritual, filled with alcohol, food, lecherous uncles, and references to the 1990s, such as the FSO Polonez car and FA deodorant. Despite its sacred context, the christening turns into a celebration of excess and sexual promiscuity. No music video was created for this track.

=== "Czarna żorżeta" ===
"Czarna żorżeta" ("Black Georgette") presents a similar figure of a woman as in "Żona piłkarza", but here, the main character is the wife of a colonel, a miserly alcoholic who neglects his morose wife. She eventually commits suicide, hoping to at least be buried in the promised titular dress. The high-budget, old-film-styled music video directed by Marcin Nowak shares a narrative alignment with the song's lyrics and shows clear inspiration from the series Noce i dnie.

=== "Córka" ===
The title of "Córka" ("Daughter") refers to the epithet "daughter of Rydzyk", which Masłowska was labeled with by the liberal portal NaTemat.pl in October 2012 after she distanced herself from the leftist community. The term briefly stuck with her. However, the song itself does not focus on Rydzyk but rather on a daughter who suffers from loneliness and struggles to be accepted by a supposedly open-minded liberal society. In interviews, Masłowska clarified that the critique in "Córka" is aimed primarily at the environment symbolized by Warsaw's Saviour Square, which, much like the right-wing, rejects anything that doesn't fit its worldview. The song does not have an accompanying music video.

=== "Społeczeństwo jest niemiłe" ===
The titular track "Społeczeństwo jest niemiłe" ("The Society Is Mean") depicts a grim community of people living ordinary lives, uninterested in others, and ignoring social issues such as poverty, prostitution, and sexual abuse. The music video, directed by Karolina Jacewicz and Maciej Thiem, shows a lonely, sad woman preparing typical Polish kotlet schabowy, emphasizing the everyday monotony and emotional isolation described in the song.

== Reception ==
Robert Sankowski describes the album's sound as an "authentic, homemade mix of rap, punk, and dance music" with lyrics that resemble a psychotic collage of popular press stories, expressed through the Polish language and its typical way of reasoning. Despite using mainstream music genres, the album was considered aimed at an elite audience. Critics described the music as minimalist, with influences from hip-hop, post-punk, and an aesthetic of dirt and trash. It was also likened to a "bazaar, cheap, reminiscent of the '90s and the golden era of disco polo", though this aligned with the adopted convention. One review noted, "The project is radically restyled, and this is both its greatest blessing and curse".

Masłowska herself deliberately emphasized her "vocal naivety", for example, not removing her lisp in the production and avoiding more sophisticated recording techniques. The music was compared to artists such as Świetliki, Niwea, The Knife, Franek Kimono, Die Antwoord, Grimes, M.I.A., and Crystal Castles.

The lyrics were noted for their satire, humor, absurdity, and guerrilla attacks on stupidity, blending street slang with snippets from glossy magazines. Critics pointed out the irony, absurd humor, pastiche, original comparisons, and a deliberate, literary babbling reminiscent of online comments and famous people's quotes. "She succeeded in writing our language – full of errors and absurd constructions – and then singing it," one reviewer wrote. According to critics, Masłowska, singing from the perspective of someone raised on the cusp of the pre- and post-1989 order, concluded that there had been no significant societal change in Poland since the early 1990s. However, the added value of her lyrics lies not in the conclusion itself, but in the expressive tools she uses – language, apt formulations, or comparisons – often grounded in pop culture from the "B" and "C" categories. The songs mock mediocrity, aspirations, and the world of celebrities who create a fantasy world to deceive the average audience.

The album received mixed reviews, with critics debating the same elements as either strengths or weaknesses. The controversy surrounding the ostentatious lack of professionalism, such as Masłowska singing with braces, mirrored the confusion that followed the release of her debut novel Wojna polsko-ruska pod flagą biało-czerwoną (Polish-Russian War Under the White-and-Red Flag). Some journalists unequivocally criticized the album, calling it "a rather poor record", "boring", "embarrassing", "unfunny", and "schematic", or an "audiobook of stale essays", where Masłowska "overdid it and bored simultaneously". Her humor was criticized as infantile, lacking depth, derivative, and with stereotypical characters.

One critique of Masłowska suggested that although she wrote from the perspective of an "ethnographer in the field", she approached it with a predetermined thesis, neglecting the effort to truly understand the people she described. On the other hand, her style and perceptiveness were positively received by some, as was her ridicule of arrogance, pretentiousness, and rusticity, the traditional division of gender roles (starting with her pseudonym), and her musical sensibility paired with an excellent ear for everyday language and wordplay. Some outlets, such as the influential alternative music site Porcys, conspicuously avoided reviewing the album altogether. Extreme opinions were also evident in comments under her songs on YouTube.

The album received recognition in year-end summaries for 2014. Onet.pl ranked Społeczeństwo jest niemiłe as the second-best Polish album of the year, while Masłowska herself was recognized as the best Polish musical artist. Radiowy Dom Kultury listeners ranked it second in the "Album of the Year" category. Gazeta Wyborcza placed the album 18th in its year-end rankings, while Niezależny Miesięcznik Studentów Szkoły Głównej Handlowej Magiel ranked it third. It was also highlighted by journalist Jacek Świąder and the Spider's Web portal. In 2015, Masłowska won the Wdechy award for Person of the Year from Gazeta Co Jest Grane, including for her musical debut.

In the academic literature written years after the release of the album, attention was drawn to the multiple layers of Społeczeństwo jest niemiłe, where Masłowska recycles "cultural waste", blending literature, music, and visual arts while blurring the boundaries between high and low culture. This album is seen as her most socially aware work. It is a collage of everyday objects, consumer goods, and lifestyles, which collectively play a significant role in the daily perception of social reality. The album is based on intertextuality, borrowing, and pastiche, elements that some critics and listeners oversimplified as mere kitsch. However, due to its ironic tone, self-irony, and themes like nostalgia and the transgression of social roles, the album can be viewed as a postmodern parody and placed within the camp aesthetic. It also fits within the so-called "loser culture".

Alena Aniskiewicz pointed out that Masłowska challenges the gender dynamics of the genre, using humor similar to Missy Elliott to carve out her place in a music scene that, in Poland as elsewhere, is dominated by men. The reception of Społeczeństwo jest niemiłe is said to require above-average cultural competencies to fully grasp.

Łukasz Wróblewski observed that Masłowska's lyrics highlight the costs individuals bear for adhering to an ostensibly stable and safe worldview. The everyday reality she presents stems from disgust and social exclusion of those who do not meet the prescribed norms, such as the relationship between two people with a significant age difference ("Ryszard"). Masłowska also criticizes the media for creating demand for what is unconventional, different, and repulsive, profiting from antagonisms and extremes ("Kinga"). As an anthropologist of everyday life, she takes stock of the routine, where society, by sanitizing the repulsive, makes reality unpleasant.

The album showcases Masłowska's versatility and fits within the broader context of her previous work. It continues the development of the hip-hop narrator MC Dorota, first introduced in her 2005 novel Paw królowej (The Peacock of the Queen), where Masłowska also used the alias MC Doris. Some characters, like those in "Hajs" and "Chleb", resemble those from Wojna polsko-ruska pod flagą biało-czerwoną, the aspiring youth with low social status trying to break into the world of celebrities.

The music video for "Chleb", directed by Krzysztof Skonieczny, became particularly popular, featuring Anja Rubik and Maciej Nowak. It received international acclaim, being featured in British Vogue, Dazed, and Fashionista.com, and was nominated for a UK Music Video Award in the Best Pop Video – Budget category. Other videos also received praise.

The album appeared twice in the OLiS chart, reaching 9th place.

"Tęcza"

Single by Dorota Masłowska
- Released: 11 November 2014
- Recorded: 2014
- Genre: Hip hop
- Length: 2:39
- Label: Kayax
- Composers: Dorota Masłowska; Jakub Wandachowicz
- Producers: Sebastian Łukaszuk; Maciej Szupica; Krzysztof Kiziewicz

== "Tęcza" ==
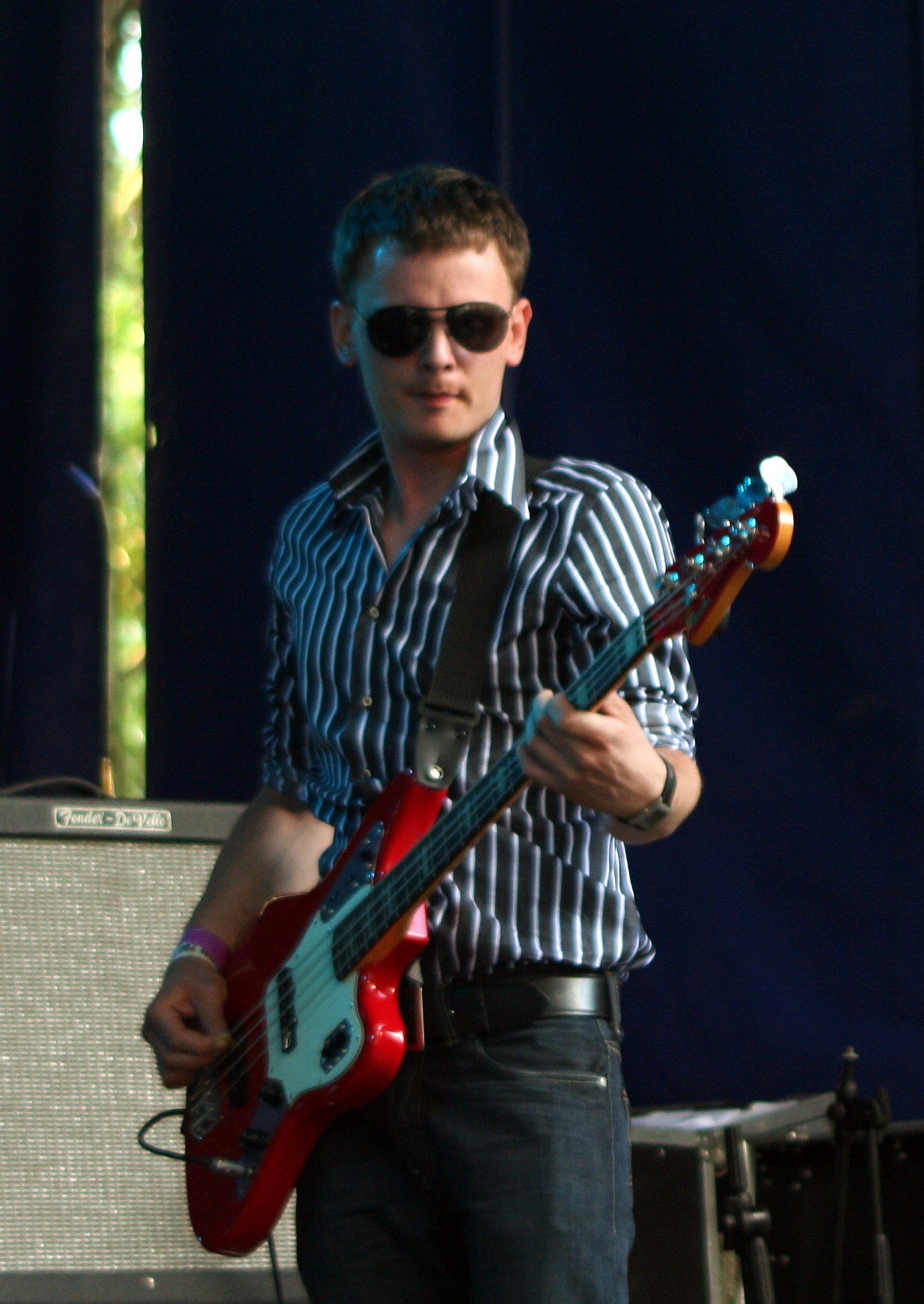
Kuba Wandachowicz

On 11 November 2014, the song "Tęcza" ("Rainbow") premiered at the Basen club in Warsaw and online. Although released separately eight months later, it stylistically and thematically continues the ideas of Społeczeństwo jest niemiłe. The song addresses the fear of others and the tendency to blame them for one's failures. It critiques Poland's culture of complaining and the grayness of everyday life for ordinary citizens, referencing the series of Rainbow burnings on Savior Square and the dangers of associating God and patriotism with hatred. Masłowska explained her motivation for writing the song, stating: "I wrote the song when the media reported once again that someone had set fire to the Rainbow on Savior Square. The ritual of burning it is very significant: it has something of a big barbecue and a big bonfire. But beneath all the grotesque, it's an act of hatred, which has become our daily bread. This song is about how wrong it is when God and Poland are dragged onto the banner of hatred".

Alena Aniskiewicz pointed out that Masłowska left little room for interpretative doubt in this song, which serves as a negative judgment of the brutal nationalism of traditional Polish identity, which fuels hatred.

The music video, directed by Maciej Szupica (Monsieur Zupika) and Krzysztof Kiziewicz (Kee Zee), features Masłowska and Michał Piróg. In the video, Masłowska plays a character who expresses disapproval of the mere presence of the rainbow, illustrating what she believes Poland should look like – gray and devoid of color (i.e., diversity). The language used does not directly quote the rhetoric of nationalist groups but absurdly exaggerates it. The video contrasts two visions of Poland: a colorful and diverse community versus a gray mass of an eternal, unchanging nation. The imagery is meant to critique the dominant conservative tone in Polish culture.

In the video, the "rainbow world" is depicted as Michał Piróg caresses a rainbow dildo, joined by other dancers. Behind him is a peacock tail – a symbol of pride. Piróg is intended as an allegory for homosexuality, a visual counterpart to the installation. The vision of the "rainbow world" is set on fire when Masłowska sings "this is Poland". Masłowska juxtaposes intolerance with Catholic values, symbolized by a "plate for the lost traveler". Zbigniew Grzegorzewski appears in the video, interpreting "this is Poland" in sign language.

The song and its video received positive reviews, though negative comments on YouTube came from both right-wing and left-wing perspectives.

== Concerts ==
Dorota Masłowska performed songs from her album Społeczeństwo jest niemiłe live with a band consisting of Marcin Macuk, Jakub Wandachowicz, Magda Staroszczyk, and Piotr Gwadera. The first promotional performance took place on 22 February 2014 at Bar Studio in Warsaw, following the opening of an exhibition at Raster Gallery. In 2014 and 2015, Masłowska embarked on two mini-tours, playing over 20 concerts, including appearances at the Off Festival, in Bucharest, and in London. Alongside songs from the album, she also performed Tęcza and covers of tracks such as Scyzoryk by Liroy, Kolory by Post Regiment, Bez matki by 19 Wiosen, Ciągle w ruchu by Kosmetyki Mrs. Pinki, and Wiedziałem, że tak będzie by Molesta Ewenement. In June 2015, Masłowska announced her decision to pause her music career, stating her desire to return to writing and humorously noting that during a concert in Elbląg, she managed to recite almost every line correctly, which she took as a sign that "something is ending". Her final concert, titled Pożegnanie ze społeczeństwem (Farewell to Society), was held on 25 November 2015 at the Hydrozagadka club in Warsaw, featuring guest appearances by Vienio in Wiedziałem, że tak będzie and Maria Strzelecka in Kolory.

The live performances were well-received, with concert versions of the songs differing significantly from their album versions through new arrangements and additional instrumentation. The concerts were styled as pastiche, integrating theatrical and performative elements in which Masłowska deconstructed the theatricality of her writer persona, blurring the lines between her onstage persona and her real self. Her goal was not to provide musical entertainment, but rather to challenge her public image. She embodied a caricature of herself as a literary star reimagined as a tacky pop icon, dressing in a sparkling, disco-inspired outfit and imitating pop stars' movements and stage banter. This overt self-theatricalization drew comparisons to David Bowie's concert alter ego, Ziggy Stardust.

== Track listing ==
1. "Ryszard" – 2:39
2. "Hajs" – 2:48
3. "Chleb" – 3:40
4. "Żona piłkarza" – 1:27
5. "Kinga" – 2:04
6. "Zapach Boga" – 3:00
7. "Prezydent" – 1:51
8. "Chrzciny" (featuring Jakub Żulczyk) – 2:37
9. "Czarna żorżeta" – 4:13
10. "Córka" (featuring Jakub Wandachowicz) – 3:00
11. "Społeczeństwo jest niemiłe" – 2:56

== Personnel ==
The album's contributors, according to source material, include:

- Dorota Masłowska – music, lyrics, vocals
- Marcin Macuk – supervision
- Malinka and Matylda – backing vocals on "Prezydent"
- Tomasz Duda – mastering
- Szymon Żydek – production coordination

== Bibliography ==
- Aniskiewicz, A. (2019). Cultural Remix: Polish Hip-Hop and the Sampling of Heritage (PDF). University of Michigan.
- Folta-Rusin, A. (2021). "Nowa ikolonologia. Alegoryczność wideoklipów Doroty Masłowskiej" [New Iconology: The Allegorical Nature of Dorota Masłowska's Music Videos] (PDF). Ruch Literacki (in Polish). 62 (3): 413–438. doi:10.24425/RL.2021.137316.
- Michalak, A. (2020). Autor jako tekst kultury. Dorota Masłowska w roli bohaterki swoich projektów artystycznych [The Author as a Cultural Text: Dorota Masłowska as the Protagonist of Her Artistic Projects] (in Polish). Warsaw: Uniwersytet Warszawski. Archived from the original on 15 August 2020.
- Sierzputowski, K. (2019). "Sandwiches with Cash and the Scent of God. Mister D. and the Post-Transformational Criticism of Polishness". In Gałuszka, P. (ed.). Made in Poland. Studies in Popular Music. London; New York: Taylor and Francis Group. ISBN 978-0-8153-6012-4.
- Świetlicki, M. (2018). "High, pop, or trash? Mister D.'s rude society of submissive consumers". Literatura Ludowa. 61 (6): 39. doi:10.12775/LL.6.2017.004.
- Wróblewski, Ł. (2016). Masłowska: opowieść o wstręcie [Masłowska: A Tale of Disgust] (in Polish). Kraków: Nomos. ISBN 978-83-7688-375-5.
- Wrzochul-Stawinoga, J. (2018). "Obraz współczesnego społeczeństwa w utworach muzycznych Doroty Masłowskiej – Mister D." [The Image of Contemporary Society in Dorota Masłowska's Music Works – Mister D.]. Kultura-Społeczeństwo-Edukacja (in Polish). 13 (1).
