= Tan Tan =

Tan Tan may refer to:

- Tan-Tan Province, in southern Morocco
- Tan-Tan, a city in Morocco
- Tan-tan, a small drum
- Eddie Thornton, Jamaican trumpeter known by his nickname "Tan Tan"
- Leucaena leucocephala, a fast-growing legume native to Southern Mexico and northern Central America
- Tan Tan, now in Terengganu, Malaysia
- Tan Tan (children's book series)
