= Andrew Tiernan =

British actor and director

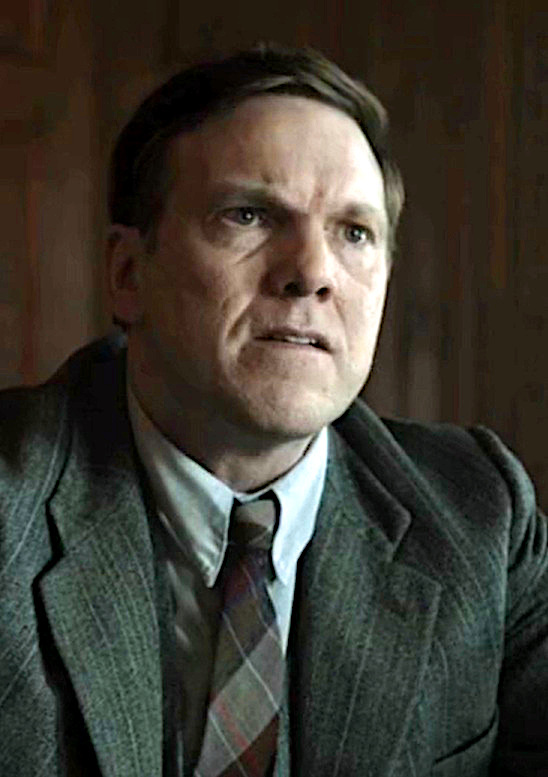
- Tiernan in Foyle's War Trailer 2013
- Born: Andrew James Tiernan; 30 November 1965 (age 60); Ladywood, Birmingham, Warwickshire, UK
- Occupations: Actor, director
- Years active: 1989–present

Andrew James Tiernan (born 30 November 1965) is a British actor and director.

== Early life ==
Tiernan spent his childhood in Ladywood, Birmingham. He began acting with the Birmingham Youth Theatre, and worked at the Midlands Art Centre, before moving to London in 1984 to take a three-year diploma studying acting, at the Drama Centre London.

== Career ==
=== Theatre ===
His theatre work has included Joe Penhall's The Bullet at the Donmar Warehouse, and a long-term collaboration with the Tony-nominated director Wilson Milam, including Ché Walker's Flesh Wound at the Royal Court Theatre and two critically acclaimed productions of Sam Shepard's plays: A Lie of the Mind at the Donmar Warehouse,. and True West at the Bristol Old Vic. In 2008, Tiernan returned to the theatre in Dorota Maslowska's A Couple of Poor, Polish-Speaking Romanians co-starring with Andrea Riseborough at the Soho Theatre.

=== Film ===
Tiernan played Piers Gaveston in Derek Jarman's controversial film of Christopher Marlowe's Edward II (1991), after appearing in Lynda La Plante's award-winning drama Prime Suspect, alongside Helen Mirren. In the same year, he went on to star as Orlando and Oliver in Christine Edzard's version of Shakespeare's As You Like It playing alongside actors James Fox and Cyril Cusack. He then went on to star in the Paul Sarossy directed thriller, Mr In-Between.

He played Szalas in Roman Polanski's film The Pianist. He worked with Antonia Bird on a number of improvisational film productions, including Safe (Bafta - Best single drama), Face, Rehab and Interview with the Vampire (1994).

Tiernan starred in Zack Snyder's 300, an adaptation of the Frank Miller graphic novel, in which he portrayed Ephialtes of Trachis. Filming took place from October 2005 to January 2006 in Montreal. To portray Ephialtes, Tiernan dressed in full body prosthetics which took 10 hours each day to complete. He portrayed the character again in the sequel 300: Rise of an Empire (2014).

He appeared as Captain Martin Stone in Marko Mäkilaakso's Stone's War.

=== TV ===
In 1993, Tiernan appeared in the series Cracker, in the episode "To Say I Love You". In 1997, he played Banquo in the Shakespeare adaptation for BBC MacBeth on the Estate alongside James Frain and Susan Vidler. In 1998, in the British TV series Hornblower, he played Bunting in the second episode, "The Examination For Lieutenant". Other credits in television include Victor Carroon in The Quatermass Experiment, Kim Trent in Life on Mars and Lenny Spearfish in the BBC TV series Jonathan Creek, in "The Curious Tale of Mr Spearfish" (1999). In 2005, he played Ben Jonson in A Waste of Shame, a William Shakespeare biopic presented as part of the BBC's ShakespeaRe-Told series. He appeared in an episode of crime drama Midsomer Murders, as Steve Bright, a photography enthusiast who is strangled with his own camera strap and in Dalziel & Pascoe as a lottery winner in the two-part episodes "Fallen Angel". In 2012, he appeared as DS Hunter in the BBC drama Prisoners' Wives.

=== Directing ===
In 2015, Tiernan made his directorial debut with the feature film Dragonfly, followed in 2017 by UK18, and in 2019 by Break Clause.

== Filmography ==
Year	Title	Role	Notes
1991	Edward II	Piers Gaveston	
1991	Prime Suspect	DC Rosper	
1992	The Guilty	Leo	
1992	As you like it	Orlando/Oliver	
1992	Prime Suspect 2	DC Rosper	
1993	Cracker	Sean Kerrigan	
1993	The Trial	Berthold	
1994	Middlemarch	Dagley	
1994	Being Human	Cyprion's Man	
1994	Interview with the Vampire	Paris Vampire	
1995	Taggart	John Campbell	Episode: "Black Orchid"
1995	Two Deaths	Captain Jorgu	
1996	The Sculptress	Gary O'Brien	
1996	Ellington	Eddie Gilmour	Episode: "Man of Honour"
1997	Snow White: A Tale of Terror	Scar	
1997	Face	Chris	
1997	Playing God	Cyril	
1997	Macbeth on The Estate	Banquo	BBC TV film
1998	The Scarlet Tunic	Muller	
1998	Hornblower	Bunting	
1999	The Criminal	Harris	
1999	Four Fathers	Johnny Starkie	
1999	Jonathan Creek	Lenny Spearfish -	Episode: "The Curious Tale of Mr Spearfish"
2000	Small Time Obsession	Mr Page	
2000	Heartbeat	Ray Nixon	Episode: "The Seven Year Itch"
2001	Left Turn	John	Short
2001	In a Land of Plenty	Gary	
2001	Hawk	Freddie	TV movie
2001	Mr In-Between	Andy	
2001	The Bunker	LCpl Schenke	
2002	The Pianist	Szalas	
2002	The Red Siren	Koesler	
2003	Rehab	Dean	TV movie
2004	Whose Baby?	Dave	
2004	Waking the Dead	Don Keech	Episode: "Anger Management"
2005	The Quatermass Experiment	Victor Carroon	
2005	The Rotters' Club	Roy Slater	
2005	Spooks	Forster	
2005	A Waste of Shame: The Mystery of Shakespeare and his Sonnets	Ben Jonson	TV movie
2006	Snuff-Movie	Constable Fred	
2006	Life on Mars	Kim Trent	
2006	Dalziel and Pascoe	Jake McNally	Episode: "Fallen Angel"
2006	300	Ephialtes	
2007	Midsomer Murders	Steve Bright	Episode: "Picture of Innocence"
2008	Heroes and Villains	Crixus	Episode: "Spartacus"
2008	Stone's War	Captain Stone	
2008	New Tricks	Sgt Major Sharratt	Episode: "Mad Dogs"
2008	Survivors	Gavin	
2009	Casualty	O'Neill	TV series
2009	Harvest	Blue	
2009	Murderland	Whitaker	
2009	The Bill	Craig Middleton	
2010	Mr Nice	Alan Marcuson	
2010	Luther	Richard Henley	
2010	Whitechapel II	Steven Dukes	
2011	Doctor Who	Purcell	Episode: "Night Terrors"
2011	Injustice	Michael Bankes	
2012	Prisoners' Wives	DS Hunter	
2012	Merlin	Osgar	
2013	Foyle's War	Geoffrey Helliwell	Episode: "Sunflowers"
2013	Dragonfly	DS Blake	
2014	300: Rise of an Empire	Ephialtes	
2014	Dark Souls II	Chancellor Wellager (voice)	Video game
2014	Common	Pete O'Shea	
2014	Autómata	Manager	
2014	The Great Fire	Vincent	
2014	The Messenger	Dad	
2015	Silent Witness	DCI John McLeod	Episode: "Falling Angels" (2 parts)
2015	Code of a Killer	Geoff Taylor	
2015	No Offence	Michael Docherty	
2016	Moving On	Rob	
2017	Safe House	Roger Lane	
2017	Us and Them	Tommy	
2017	Bounty Hunters	Smith	
2018	Marcella (series 2)	Nigel Stafford	
2019	Death in Paradise (series 8)	Paul Raynor	
2019	Burning Men	Mad Dad	
2021	2003	Phil	Short film
2021	Innocent (series 2)	John Taylor	
2021	Code of Silence	Peter Brodie	
2026	The Man with the Plan	Aneurin Bevan	
