= People in Cages =

Short play

People in Cages is a short play by the British writer, David Henry Wilson, first performed in 2000. The play consists of four short vignettes, each of which revolves around different individuals or groups of people locked inside a cage for the entertainment of paying visitors, reminiscent of a sideshow.

== Synopsis ==
Each of the four vignettes that make up People in Cages addresses different social issues, such as racism, and how people can become trapped by society. Although some of these issues are weighty, and each play is ultimately quite tragic, the plays themselves are laced with humour and comedy. The humour is typically very surreal in view of the unusual premise of having people locked inside cages for the viewing pleasure of others and that some of these people are out of the ordinary in unexpected ways.

The four vignettes are independent of one another, apart from the linking character of the cage-keeper, Mr Jacob, and can therefore be performed separately or in any order. However, when performed together, the author recommends that they should be performed in the following order.

=== Killer in a Cage ===
The Killer paces in his cages as Mr Jacob brings in Mr and Mrs Smith. After warning them to keep clear of the cage, Jacob leaves the couple to enjoy the show. The Killer proceeds to deny that he has ever killed anyone and gradually draws Mr and Mrs Smith in, trying to persuade them that he stays in his cage so that people can come to him for help.

When Mr Smith expresses doubt that the Killer is in his cage by choice, the Killer removes one of the bars from his cage and steps out, scaring the couple intensely for fear of what he might do to them. The Killer continues to insist that he has been misrepresented and does not wish to do the couple harm, while nevertheless acting in a threatening manner.

After stroking Mrs Smith's hair to soothe her, an act which annoys Mr Smith, but about which he does nothing, she admits that she does not think the Killer is a killer. The Killer then challenges Mr Smith to put the bar back into the cage to show his strength, a challenge which Mr Smith fails. The Killer puts the bar back himself, shutting a panicked Mr Smith in the cage who starts shouting for help. The Killer then expresses to Mrs Smith that her husband appears to be a failure and has, in particular, failed to protect her from this killer. She subsequently rejects her husband for his failure.

Jacob returns and orders the Killer back into the cage at gunpoint. The Killer then proclaims to have succeeded in killing Mr and Mrs Smith and to boast that he can kill anybody, but still denying to have killed his family. After Jacob and the Smiths have left, the Killer's mood changes and he speaks to the audience, claiming that he is just doing his job and that both he and the audience are killers in cages.

=== Babes in a Cage ===
Miss Jones is brought by Mr Jacob to view three babies in a cage, although the cage is referred to as a playpen by Jacob. The babies, named Pinkie, Yellow and Bluey, are clearly fully grown and quite different from each other, yet Jacob insists that they are just babies and are identical triplets. The fact that they do not look identical is one of the points of interest of the babies. Jacob also reveals that the babies parents were killed, one being stabbed and the other shot.

After Jacob has left Miss Jones with the babies, she tries to engage them in conversation. Increasingly fractious arguments between the babies and Miss Jones culminate in Bluey and Yellow pulling a knife and a gun, respectively, from their underpants, although the babies refer to these weapons as a "kernife" and a "gum". Yellow says that he has his bum in his pants and then proceeds to pull out a bomb. Concerned for her safety, and believing she now knows how the parents were killed, she calls Mr Jacob who insists that the weapons are just toys. He is then shot by Pinkie.

While Miss Jones is offstage retrieving a policeman, Jacob gets up, scolding Pinkie for firing the gun, but then realises that the resulting scandal might help to get the punters in.

When the policeman arrives, he questions the babies but they respond to him only with gibberish, causing the policeman to arrest Miss Jones for wasting police time.

=== Couple in a Cage ===
Mr and Mrs Grey are locked in a cage which they treat as their home. Mrs Grey is fed up with living in a cage and entertaining the visitors brought by Mr Jacob, while Mr Grey is concerned that, if they leave the cage, he will not be able to find a better job. Mrs Grey issues a stream of insults against her nervous husband for failing to fulfil the promises of a good life he made to her before they were married.

Jacob enters to warn the couple that they need to look cheerful for the visitors or they will lose their job. He also orders Mr Grey to have a wash since he smells. While Mr Grey is washing, Jacob propositions Mrs Grey, offering her a better life if she will have sexual intercourse with him. Once Mr Grey has finished washing, Mrs Grey challenges her husband to defend her honour, but he instead seeks to appease Mr Jacob in an effort to keep his job.

Jacob leaves to bring in the latest visitors and, in his absence, Mrs Grey further insults her husband, finally labelling him as pathetic. When Jacob returns with Mr and Mrs Brown, Mrs Grey ignores them while Mr Grey attempts to engage them in mindless banter. When questioned directly by the Browns, Mrs Grey launches into a tirade about how she is sick of her life, upsetting the Browns and leading Jacob to fire Mr and Mrs Grey. Mrs Grey leaves the cage with pleasure, while Mr Grey fights to maintain his position, to no avail.

Once the Greys have left, Jacob puts on an act of being in a desperate situation now his cage is empty. The Browns, currently unemployed, offer to step into the cage, with Mr Brown believing this to be their lucky day, while Mrs Brown is somewhat less certain. Jacob locks them into the cage and goes off to bring in the next visitor.

=== Green Man in a Cage ===
In the final, poignant play, Mr Jacob brings the Lovely family to see a green man who is locked in the cage with his hands tied. Helen Lovely, the daughter of Mr and Mrs Lovely, is immediately taken with this sad-looking green man and strikes up a silent rapport with him. Jacob explains how the green man is not really human, although he may appear so, and is unable to speak or understand anything except basic commands. When ordered to perform tricks such as scratching his head and beating his chest, Mr and Mrs Lovely are hugely impressed and leave as very satisfied customers having witnessed this animal performing.

Once the Lovelys have left, the green man sings about his captivity and his desire for release, through death, in a form reminiscent of a spiritual. Jacob catches him singing and beats him viciously for disobeying his orders never to speak or communicate.

As Jacob leaves, Helen Lovely returns to bring the green man some food and is happy to learn that he is able to speak. She unties his hands and tries to set him free using a hairpin to pick the lock of the cage. She touches him to see if the green comes off, but the green man explains that he is green as a result of genetics. After loosely tying his hands again, Helen leaves, promising to come back and visit.

The following morning, Jacob enters with a policeman who orders the green man to confess to the rape and murder of Helen Lovely. Helen had been found in Jacob's bedroom, having been shot with Jacob's gun. The green man is the only suspect, despite having been locked in a cage with his hands tied. Finding that the green man's hands are only loosely tied and that there are scratch marks from a hairpin around the lock on the cage door, the policeman concludes that this is sufficient evidence of the green man's guilt and leads him away.

== Publication ==
People in Cages was first published in Great Britain in 2002 by Hope Corner. The published play includes two other short plays by Wilson, Reflections and The Biscuit. Reflections is a collection of short monologues while The Biscuit, in common with People in Cages, features a character locked in a cage where he is tormented and finally killed by his captors.

== Production history ==
People in Cages was first produced by Michael Friend Productions at the Mill Studio, Guildford, England in February 2000. This production was subsequently performed at Union Theatre, London in March 2000.

A further production of the play was produced by Progress Theatre, Reading, England in April 2007 to mixed reviews.

== Critical reception ==
The entry for People in Cages in the March 2000 edition of in SE1 described the play as hilarious.
