= Seven Little Mice Have Fun on the Ice =

Seven Little Mice Have Fun on the Ice (ねずみのさかなつり, Nezumi no sakana tsuri; Mice going fishing) is a children's book written by Haruo Yamashita (山下 明生, Yamashita Haruo) and illustrated by Kazuo Iwamura. It was published in Japanese in 1986 by Child Honsha and in English in 2011, the latter edition by North South Books.

In the book, the seven mice children and their mother go ice fishing.

== Reception ==
Kirkus Reviews called attention to "cozy sepia tones" and the winter-related colors, stating that they in sum "contrast nicely" and that the former "signal the warmth of home". Kirkus Reviews praised the "adorable and expressive" mice and stated that children would "likely" desire the book, though the review states: "it’s bit of a pity the children aren't given individual personalities."

Catherine Callegar of the Gay-Kimball Library in Troy, New Hampshire wrote in a review in School Library Journal that it "is a welcome addition to any library", citing the drawings that "are just right for the text."

Bethany Templeton Klem, in the Horn Book Guide, stated that in this book and in the book Seven Little Mice Go to School, stated that the characters were "engaging" and praised the "charmingly detailed" artwork; Klem said that the endings of these books happen "abruptly".
