= Good-Bye, Winter! Hello, Spring! =

1985 picture book by Kazuo Iwamura

Good-Bye, Winter! Hello, Spring! (もうはるですね, Mou haru desune) is a children's picture book made by Kazuo Iwamura. The original Japanese book was published in 1985 by Shiko-sha (至光社). One English version, Spring in the Dark Wood, was published by A&C Black in the United Kingdom in 1985 (ISBN 978-0-7136-2744-2); Peggy Blakeley did the English text of that version. Another English version was published in 2019 by North South Books. The translator of the 2019 version, David Henry Wilson, did not translate directly from Japanese, but instead translated from a German translation by Rose Pflock, which is titled Wenn der Frühling kommt.

Three squirrel siblings, named Mack, Mick, and Molly (Note: They are named Mack, Mick, and Molly in the North South version and Eric, Derek, and Daisy in the A&C Black version. The names in Japanese are Paro (ぱろ), Piko (ぴこ), and Poro (ぽろ).) experience the snow melting and find their way back to their family.

Kristy Kilfoyle of Canterbury School in Fort Myers, Florida, in a review for School Library Journal, described it as primarily "an adventure story" although it has some educational content.

Earth colors are used in the artwork, described as "subtle" by Publishers Weekly.

== Reception ==
Reviewer Carolyn Phelan, in Booklist, described the 2019 English version of the book as "charming", with "precise, graceful" lines in the artwork and "beauty" in the scenery depicted in the book. She stated that "most of the verse couplets flow smoothly" though she saw some wording was 'rhyme-driven".

Kirkus Reviews praised the "masterful watercolor illustrations" which it says is the book's "main appeal", and that they make a "deep, magical atmosphere." The review states the text of the 2019 translation has some "disjointed areas" and "a few awkward moments" while trying to rhyme.

Publishers Weekly states the book has "Graceful artwork" and the text of the 2019 translation "casual lyricism".

Kilfoyle stated that the 2019 translation's aim for a "rhyming structure" and "awkward phrasing" negatively impact the experience; she praised the "delightful illustrations".
