= Nakagawa, Tochigi =

Nakagawa 那珂川町
- Town
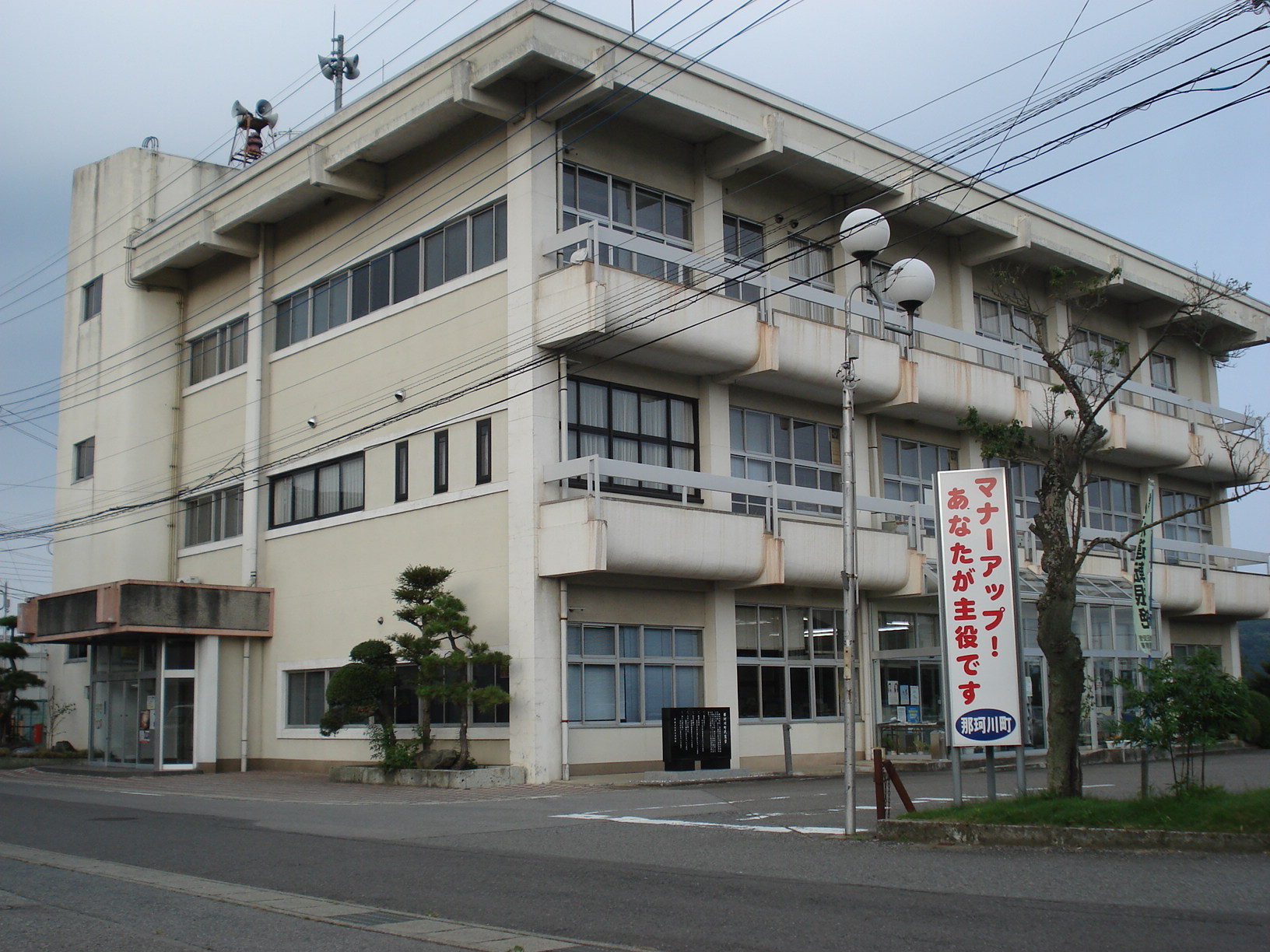
- NakagawaTown Office - Ogawa Branch

- Flag Seal

- Location of Nakagawa in Tochigi Prefecture

- Coordinates: 36°44′17.5″N 140°10′17.4″E
- Country: Japan
- Region: Kantō
- Prefecture: Tochigi Prefecture
- District: Nasu

Area
  - Total: 192.78 km^{2} (74.43 sq mi)

Population (August 2020)
  - Total: 15,824
  - Density: 82.083/km^{2} (212.59/sq mi)
- Time zone: UTC+9 (Japan Standard Time)
- Tree: Pine
- Flower: Katakuri
- Bird: Japanese bush warbler
- Phone number: 0287-92-1111
- Address: Bato 409, Nakagawa-machi, Nasu-gun, Tochigi-ken 324-0692
- Website: Official website

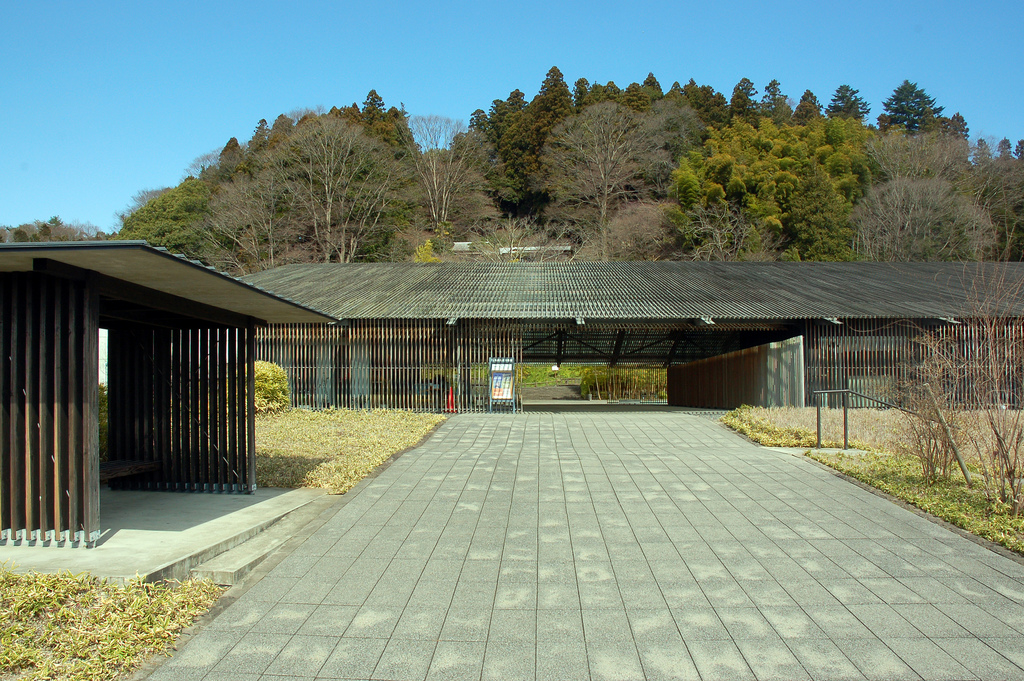
Bato Hiroshige Museum

Nakagawa (那珂川町, Nakagawa-machi) is a town located in Tochigi Prefecture, Japan. As of 1 August 2020, the town had an estimated population of 15,824 in 6,028 households, and a population density of 82 persons per km^{2}. Its total area of the town is 192.79 square kilometres (74.44 sq mi). On October 4, 2013, a portion of the town was designated one of The Most Beautiful Villages in Japan.

== Geography ==
Nakagawa is located in northeast Tochigi Prefecture.

=== Surrounding municipalities ===
Ibaraki Prefecture

- Daigo
- Hitachiōmiya

Tochigi Prefecture

- Ōtawara
- Nasukarasuyama
- Sakura

=== Climate ===
Nakagawa has a humid subtropical climate (Köppen Cfa) characterized by warm summers and cold winters with heavy snowfall. The average annual temperature in Nakagawa is 12.8 °C. The average annual rainfall is 1418 mm with September as the wettest month. The temperatures are highest on average in August, at around 24.8 °C, and lowest in January, at around 1.6 °C.

== Demographics ==
Per Japanese census data, the population of Nakagawa has declined over the past 60 years.

Historical population
Year	Pop.	±%
1960	29,256	—
1970	24,138	−17.5%
1980	22,704	−5.9%
1990	22,383	−1.4%
2000	20,999	−6.2%
2010	18,460	−12.1%
2020	15,215	−17.6%

== History ==
The town of Batō was created within Nasu District, Tochigi on May 29, 1891, with the establishment of the modern municipalities system. Nakagawa was created on October 1, 2005, from the merger of Batō with the neighboring town of Ogawa.

== Government ==
Nakagawa has a mayor-council form of government with a directly elected mayor and a unicameral town council of 13 members. Nakagawa, together with the city of Nasukarasuyama collectively contributes one member to the Tochigi Prefectural Assembly. In terms of national politics, the town is part of Tochigi 3rd district of the lower house of the Diet of Japan.

== Economy ==
The economy of Nakagawa is heavily dependent on agriculture.

== Education ==
Nakagawa has three public primary schools and public two middle schools operated by the town government. The town has one public high school operated by the Tochigi Prefectural Board of Education.

== Transportation ==
=== Railway ===
- Nakagawa does not have any passenger railway service.

=== Highway ===
- National Route 293
- National Route 294
- National Route 400
- National Route 461

== Local attractions ==
- Bato onsen
- Karanogosho Cave Tombs, National Historic Site
- Nakagawa-machi Batō Hiroshige Museum of Art
- Nasu Kanda Castle ruins, National Historic Site
- Nasu Kanga ruins, National Historic Site
- Nasu Ogawa Kofun Cluster, National Historic Site
- Iwamura Kazuo Ehon-no-Oka Art Museum (いわむらかずお絵本の丘美術館)

== International relations ==
- Horseheads, New York, United States, since 1990
