= Paul Sirett =

English dramatist

Paul Sirett is an English dramatist best known for his popular music-related shows. His plays and musicals have been awarded Best Off-West End Musical, Whatsonstage's Best Play, Pearson's Best New Play, City Life's Best Writer & Best Play.

== Shows ==
- Oxy & The Morons – by Paul Sirett, Mike Peters and Steve Allan Jones for New Wolsey Theatre (2017)
- Reasons To Be Cheerful – featuring the music of Ian Dury and The Blockheads New Wolsey Theatre by Paul Sirett, directed by Jenny Sealey (2010)
- Polish-Speaking Romanians – Dorota Masłowska translated by Lisa Goldman and Paul Sirett
- The Big Life – Paul Sirett nominated for Laurence Olivier Award for Best New Musical 2006
- The Iron Man – adapted from the Ted Hughes story for Graeae Theatre Company
- Come Dancing – Ray Davies and Paul Sirett for Theatre Royal Stratford East
- Jamaica House – Paul Sirett for Theatre Workshop which had a site-specific performance on the top floor of a tower block
- Running the Silk Road by Paul Sirett for Yellow Earth Theatre
- Lush Life – with the music of Ella Fitzgerald Live Theatre, Newcastle 2005.
- The Mandelson Files – short play about Peter Mandelson played at BAC in London.
- Skaville – homage to two-tone and ska
- Crusade – on conflict in the Middle East for Stratford East.
- Worlds Apart – on immigration control Stratford East 1993.
- A Night in Tunisia – about a be-bop saxophonist Stratford East 1992.

== See also ==
- Bliss (British band) Coventry
- Additional guitar on Sue (album) Frazier Chorus 1989
