= Marcin Nowak (director) =

- Born: 1978 (age 47–48); Łódź, Poland
- Occupations: Producer, director, special effects artist
- Years active: 2000s - present
- Employer(s): NowakGames, Freelance

Marcin Nowak (born 1978 in Łódź) is a Polish director, games developer, lecturer, visual effects artist, editor and illustrator. The foundation for his career began while studying cinematography and editing in Łódź. With his first experience in film and computer games in the 2000s, he focused his work on special effects. With over ten years of film and games production, he deals with projects ranging from production to stop-motion animation. He was a lecturer at Polish National Film School in Łódź from 2015 to 2024 and he is a member of Polish Editors Association.

== Computer games ==
In 2003, he started working on a computer game, The Witcher, as a scriptwriter, main cutscene director, motion capture director and motion capture actor. He was one of the first in Poland to use motion capture in practice. For The Witcher 2: Assassins of Kings he was responsible for the main trailers and features. For the 2015 game Dying Light he served as cutscene director, motion capture director and scriptwriter.

== Feature films ==
For the film Snow White and Russian Red (2009), Nowak was responsible for action and special effects design, on-set supervision of special effects and post-production. In Manhunt (2012) he held the post of the second unit director and handled the film's VFX. For The Girl from the Wardrobe (2013), Nowak managed the VFX's pre-production, design and on-set supervision.

== Short films, video clips, and commercials ==
While directing the video clip "Do jutra" (2009) for Borys Szyc, Nowak utilized miniatures and puppetry animation. In 2012, during a period of one month, he produced, directed and shot a short animated film, Honey I Killed the Cats, based on a text by Dorota Masłowska. He also directed a series of animated commercials for Paperlinx Packaging.
