= Nakagawa-machi Batō Hiroshige Museum of Art =

- 那珂川町馬頭広重美術館
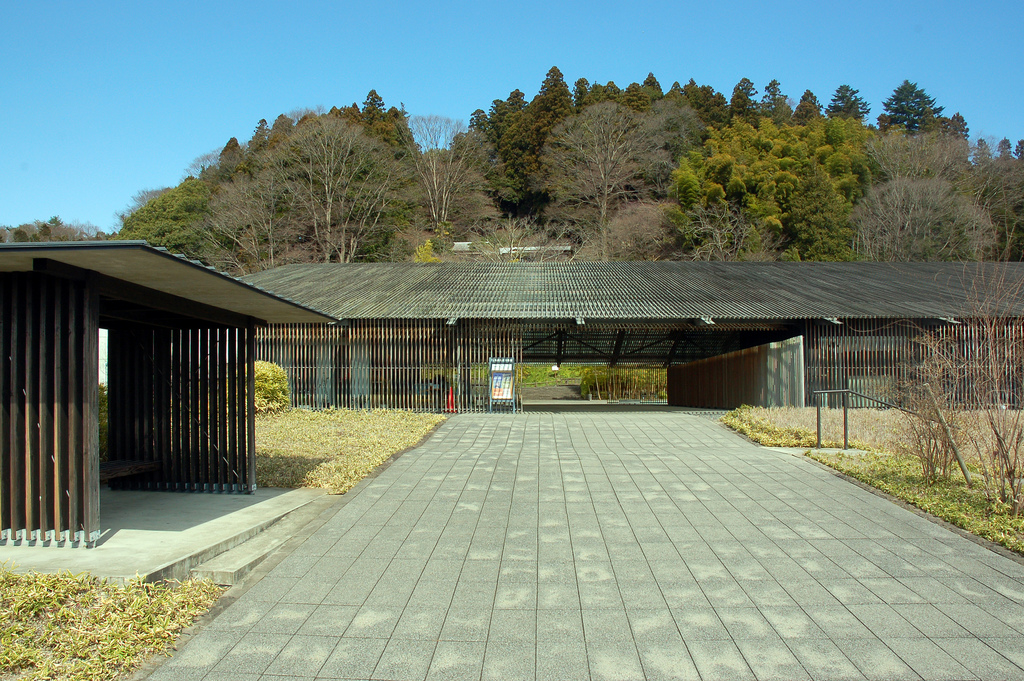
- Interactive map of the Nakagawa-machi Batō Hiroshige Museum of Art area

General information
- Location: 116-9 Batō, Nakagawa, Tochigi Prefecture, Japan
- Coordinates: 36°44′21″N 140°10′16″E
- Opened: 2000

Technical details
- Floor count: 1
- Floor area: 1,962.43 square metres (21,123.4 sq ft)

Design and construction
- Architect: Kuma Kengo

Website
- Official website

Nakagawa-machi Batō Hiroshige Museum of Art (那珂川町馬頭広重美術館, Nakagawa-machi Batō Hiroshige Bijutsukan) opened in the Batō area of Nakagawa, Tochigi Prefecture, Japan, in 2000. In a prize-winning building designed by Kuma Kengo, the museum's collection includes nikuhitsu-ga by Hiroshige, woodblock prints of the Utagawa school, Meiji-period prints by Kobayashi Kiyochika, and works by Kawamura Kiyoo.

== See also ==
- Tochigi Prefectural Museum of Fine Arts
