= Where Are You Going? To See My Friend! =

Where Are You Going? To See My Friend! (どこへいくの? ともだちにあいに!, Doko e iku no? Tomodachi ni ai ni!) is a bilingual English-Japanese children's picture book by Eric Carle and Kazuo Iwamura, published in 2001 in Japan by Doshinsha and in 2003 in the United States by Orchard/Scholastic.

The book has two segments: a story in English by Carle where a boy and several animals discuss friendship, in which the narrative moves from left to right, and a story in Japanese by Iwamura where a girl and several animals do likewise, going from right to left. The two stories and children meet in the center of the book. Each segment reflects the kind of style seen in each language's book style. There is a pronunciation guide telling English speakers how to pronounce Japanese. In the book jacket interior, there are essays from the authors about their collaboration.

The book has icons showing which animal is saying which words.

== Reception ==
Publishers Weekly gave the book a starred review, stating that the work is "charming" and praising how the two different art styles harmonize.

Kirkus Reviews stated that the book is "unique" and that it would be "a wonderful opportunity for tandem reading in a bilingual story time." It states that library treatment may prevent people checking out the book from seeing the inside cover interviews.

John Peters, in Booklist, stated that overall the book is an "inviting celebration" and that the two styles mix "without jarring contrast"; in regards to the interviews, Peters said they "will be lost to most children."

Jennifer M. Brabander, in The Horn Book Magazine, wrote that the pages are "Well-designed", and that the book is "innovative". She stated that because the book does not say that vertical Japanese texts are read right to left, a child may not determine immediately how it should be read.

Andrea Tarr of Corona Public Library in Corona, California called it "irresistible" and "spirited".
