= Seven Little Mice Go to School =

1981 Japanese picture book

Seven Little Mice Go to School (ねずみのでんしゃ, Nezumi no Densha; Mouse Train) is a 1981 picture book written by Haruo Yamashita (山下 明生, Yamashita Haruo) and illustrated by Kazuo Iwamura. It was originally published by Child Honsha. The English version was published in 2011 by NorthSouth Books. There is also a 1999 French translation, Le Train de Souris.

The main characters are a set of septuplet mice and their mother; the latter must coax the former to attend classes. She makes a "mouse train" to get the children to go to school. The group repels a snake that is in their way. The mouse train ends up gaining more members.

The work's plot mainly concerns itself with the mother character trying to coax her children to come to their classes rather than anxiety about being in school.

== Reception ==
Ieva Bates of Ann Arbor District Library reviewed the book for School Library Journal. She argued the work is "clever" and that it "should have broad appeal."

Isabel Baker and Miriam Baker Schiffer, in YC Young Children, wrote that the plot "oozes charm without being saccharine." They praised the "lively and detailed" artwork.

Hazel Rochman of Booklist wrote that the book is "Both sweet and scary" and that various aspects "will appeal to children".

Publishers Weekly gave a positive review, stating that there is "understated elegance" and that despite the book's age, "it holds up."

Kirkus Reviews argues that the book does not have enough humor, and that the pieces of artwork "add little narrative heft to the slight story."

Bethany Templeton Klem, in the Horn Book Guide, stated that in this book and in the book Seven Little Mice Have Fun on the Ice, stated that the characters were "engaging" and praised the "charmingly detailed" artwork; Klem said that the endings of these books happen "abruptly".

== Sequels ==
A book starring the same characters, Seven Little Mice Have Fun on the Ice, was published in Japanese in 1986 and in English in 2011.

Another book with the same characters, Seven Little Mice Go to the Beach (previously published in English as The Mouse Family Go to the Beach and Mice at the Beach) was first published in Japan in 1987.
