= David Henry Wilson =

English writer

- Born: 1937 (age 88–89); London, England
- Education: Dulwich College; Pembroke College, Cambridge
- Occupation: writer
- Children: 3
- Writing career
- Notable works: The Coachman Rat (1989); People in Cages (2000)

David Henry Wilson (born 1937, in London) is an English writer. As an author he is best known for his children's stories such as the Jeremy James series. Wilson has also had a number of plays produced in the United Kingdom, both for children and adults. He is also the author of The Coachman Rat (1989), a satirical novel based on the Cinderella story.

== Biography ==
Wilson was educated at Dulwich College and Pembroke College, Cambridge. He has lived in France, Ghana, Germany and Switzerland, and for many years was a lecturer at the universities of Bristol and Konstanz (where he founded and ran the university theatre).

Wilson has had many books published in the United Kingdom. A number of these have also been translated into other languages. He also translates many works from French and German, ranging from children's books by Kirsten Boie to travel guides by Peter Sager, art history by Werner Hofmann, and literary theory by Wolfgang Iser. He is also a prolific playwright, writing both short and full-length works. A common theme appears to be sequels to works by Shakespeare.

== Personal life ==
Wilson is widowed and has three grown-up children; he now lives in Taunton, Somerset. He is a fan of cricket and classical music and also enjoys rugby. His youngest child, J.J. Amaworo Wilson is an American-based author whose magical realist novel Damnificados is an award winner.

== Selected works for children ==
- The Jeremy James series, comprising:
  - Elephants Don’t Sit on Cars (1978)
  - Never Say Moo to a Bull, formerly Getting Rich With Jeremy James (1979)
  - How the Lion Lost his Lunch, formerly Beside the Sea with Jeremy James (1980)
  - Can a Spider Learn to Fly?, formerly How to Stop a Train with One Finger (1983)
  - Do Goldfish Play the Violin? (1985)
  - Please Keep Off the Dinosaur (1993)
  - Do Gerbils Go to Heaven? (1996)
  - Never Steal Wheels from a Dog (2001)
- These have been combined by Macmillan Children's Books into three volumes:
  - Triple Trouble with Jeremy James
  - Causing Chaos with Jeremy James
  - Making Mischief with Jeremy James
- The Fastest Gun Alive
- The Superdog series - Superdog, Superdog the Hero, Superdog in Trouble
- Gander of the Yard, Gideon Gander Solves the World's Greatest Mysteries
- The Coachman Rat, a novel (Carroll & Graf, 1989)
- The Castle of Inside Out (Alma Books, 1997)

Translations

- Good-Bye, Winter! Hello, Spring! (1985, English version 2019) by Kazuo Iwamura, translated from the German version by Rose Pflock.

== Selected plays ==
- We’re Looking for Mary Pickford. Two ancient children rebel against their mother.
- Jones v Jones. The disintegration of a marriage.
- Who Cares? A farcical tragedy, in which two pensioners prepare to donate their meagre savings to charity
- People in Cages.
- Are You Normal, Mr Norman? & other short plays, including the title play, in which Mr Norman visits a demon dentist
- The Death Artist.
- Gas and Candles
- The Make-Up Artist (1973), one-act play employing extensive quotation from Shakespeare.

== Selected Shakespearian themed plays ==
- Shylock's Revenge, a full-length sequel to The Merchant of Venice (Shakespearian–sized cast, first produced at University of Hamburg).
- Iago, The Villain of Venice, a full-length sequel to Othello (another large cast).
- Excellent Beauty & other short plays, including How To Avoid A Tragedy, a 30-minute, happy-ending romp through Shakespeare's four great tragedies (3m, 1f, winner of the Hydrae Prize 2003.) "Very witty, light and entertaining" (Royal Shakespeare Company).
- Lear's Fool / The Tragedy of Lady Macbeth. Two one-hour plays, exploring two of Shakespeare's most enigmatic characters. (4m, 1f and a minimum of 4m, 2f, first produced at the Jermyn Street Theatre, London.) "Rewriting Shakespeare requires a fair amount of courage, not to mention talent – both of which David Henry Wilson appears to possess in considerable amounts" (West End Extra).
