= New Earth Theatre =

British touring theatre company

New Earth Theatre (previously Yellow Earth Theatre) is a British touring theatre company based in London and established in 1995 to raise the profile of British East and Southeast Asian (BESEA) theatre. The company also runs several initiatives to support and develop British East and Southeast Asian talent.

The company has received national attention for its support of BESEA actors, writers and directors.

== New Earth Academy Programme ==
In 2011, the company began collaborating with Academy of Live and Recorded Arts to increase the number of East and Southeast Asians attending drama school in the United Kingdom.

Now known as New Earth Academy, New Earth collaborates with a number of drama schools and theatres to offer free specialist training and opportunities in the performing arts for British East and Southeast Asians. They currently hold academy courses in London, Manchester, Birmingham, Liverpool and Leeds.

Alumni of New Earth Academy include Jessica Henwick, Mei Mac and Emma Lau.

== History ==
The company was founded by David K.S. Tse, Kumiko Mendl, Tom Wu, Veronica Needa (1959–2023) and Kwong Loke.

David K.S. Tse was the Artistic Director 1995–2008; Jonathan Man and Philippe Cherbonnier co-Artistic Directors 2009–2010; and Kumiko Mendl from 2011 to 2024. In 2017, Mendle spoke out on the issue of underrepresentation of actors with Asian heritage. Self-identifying as British Asian, she stated that there were "a great many wonderful, talented British Asian actors, but we get few enough roles as it is, because we're not seen as English".

The current artistic director is Ailin Conant.

In 2020, the company rebranded as New Earth Theatre to signal new beginnings, new growth and new possibilities.

== Awards ==
- Pearl Award for Creative Endeavour (2004)
- Windrush Award (Arts Achievement) to David K.S. Tse (2004)
- Sainsbury's Checkout Theatre Award for Play to Win.

== Past and present productions ==
- New Territories by David K.S. Tse – September 1996
- Behind the Chinese Takeaway directed by Erika Tan & David K.S. Tse – September 1997
- The Whisper of a Leaf Falling directed by Philippe Cherbonnier – September 1998
- Blue Remembered Hills by Dennis Potter, directed by David Glass – September 1999
- Play to Win by David K.S. Tse – September 2000
- Rashomon adapted by Philippe Cherbonnier – October 2001
- Face by Veronica Needa – February 2002 and 2005
- Typhoon supported by Soho Theatre and Esmée Fairbairn Foundation – June 2002, 2003, 2004 and 2005
- The Butcher's Skin by Luu Quang Vu – September 2002
- Lear's Daughters by Elaine Feinstein and The Women's Theatre Group – November 2003
- Festival for the Fish by Yu Miri – January 2004
- 58 by Philippe Cherbonnier – October 2004
- The Nightingale adapted by David K.S. Tse – November 2005
- King Lear adapted by David K.S. Tse – November 2006 in the West End and Shanghai
- Running the Silk Road by Paul Sirett – May 2008
- Boom by Jean Tay – October 2009
- wAve by Sung Rno – October 2009
- A Dream of Red Pavilions by Jeremy Tiang – 2010
- Dim Sum Nights by Kumiko Mendl, Claire Sumi, Victoria Shepherd and Thanh Le Dang. Performed by Oliver Biles, Matthew Leonhart, Tina Chiang and Louise-Mai Newberry - November 2012.
- The Chang Institute by Kumiko Mendl, Joseph Davies, Jessica Henwick and Thanh Le Dang- July 2012
- Why the Lion Danced by Carey English – February - March 2013
- The Last Days of Limehouse by Jeremy Tiang, directed by Kumiko Mendl and Gary Merry - 16 July - 3 August 2014
- Yeh Shen written by Vicky Ireland, directed by Kumiko Mendl - UK Tour: 31 January - 5 April 2015
- Ashita No Kaze - first Japanese Playreading Festival 12 October - 12 December
- Tamburlaine adapted & directed by Ng Choon Ping - UK Tour: March - April 2017
- Mountains: The Dreams of Lily Kwok by Insook Chappell, directed by Jennifer Tang - UK Tour: March - June 2018
- Forgotten 遗忘 by Daniel York Loh, directed by Kim Pearce - 17–20 October 2018 Theatre Royal Plymouth, 23 October - 17 November 2018 Arcola Theatre
- Flight Paths written by Glen Neath, co-directed by Maria Oshodi and Kumiko Mendl - UK Tour: 2 – 30 March 2019
- Under the Umbrella by Amy Ng, based on an original idea by Lian Wilkinson - UK Tour: 2 – 30 March 2019
- Fix 懼 by Julie Tsang - 14 January – 1 February 2020
- Signal Fires: Beyond Chinatown in collaboration with North West BESEA Creatives - 31 October and 1 November 2020
- Miss Julie Adapted by Amy Ng after August Strindberg - UK Tour: 22 June – 10 July 2021
- Sonic Phở - The Audio Dining Experience written by Anna Nguyen - June 2022
- Tsunagu/Connect Live co-authored and co-directed by Kumiko Mendl and Kazuko Hohki - 23–30 April 2022
- The Apology by Kyo Choi, directed by Ria Parry - 15 September - 8 October 2022
- Worth by Joanne Lau, directed by Mingyu Lin - 7–20 May 2024
- Seedlings: A Climate Festival for the Curious and Hopeful presented by Kali Theatre, New Earth Theatre and Tara Theatre - March 2025
