= Nasu Kanda Castle =

Nasu-Kanda Castle
- 那須神田城
- Nakagawa, Tochigi Prefecture, Japan

Site information
- Type: hirayama-style Japanese castle
- Open to the public: yes
- Condition: ruins

Location
- Coordinates: 36°45′10″N 140°7′38″E

Site history
- Built: c.1125
- In use: Heian period

Nasu-Kanda Castle (那須神田城, Nasu-Kanda jō) was a Heian period Japanese castle located in what is now part of the town of Nakagawa, Tochigi Prefecture, in the northern Kantō region of Japan. The site has been protected as a National Historic Site, since 1984.

== Background ==
Nasu-Kanda Castle was built by Fujiwara no Sukeie in 1125 AD. Fujiwara no Sukeie was the ancestor of the Nasu clan. More of a large fortified manor than an actual castle, the structure had a rectangular layout 117 meters north-to-south by 66 meters east-to-west, and was surrounded by a high earthen rampart with a height of up to five meters and a water moat. This was the seat of the Nasu clan for four generations, during which time the clan was still using the surname of "Sudō". It was abandoned around the end of the Heian period.

Most of the rampart on the eastern side was destroyed during the construction of a modern housing district, and parts of the western side are covered in rice paddies. What remains of the ruins is now part of a public park.

== See also ==
- List of Historic Sites of Japan (Tochigi)
