= The Coachman Rat =

1989 book by David Henry Wilson

- Original print cover
- Author: David Henry Wilson
- Language: English
- Genre: Fairy tale, science/fantasy fiction, allegory
- Publisher: Robinson
- Publication place: United Kingdom
- Media type: Print (hardcover & paperback)
- Pages: 171 pp (hardcover edition)

The Coachman Rat is an dark, alternative retelling of the classic fairy tale Cinderella. It was published in 1989, written by children's author David Henry Wilson.

== Plot ==
The narrative follows Robert, a rat who is fascinated by the human world. One night, a "woman of light" (the Fairy Godmother) transforms him into a coachman. He drives Amadea (Cinderella) to the royal ball in a golden carriage.

At midnight, the spell reverses, reverting Robert to a rat once again. Strangely, he still possesses human speech. He is cast out by his fellow rodents, eventually captured by humans, displayed as a talking novelty, studied by scientists, and eventually educated. Struggling to find his place, he searches for the woman of light once again, hoping she will make him permanently human.

Along his journey, he discovers the cruelty or humans. He becomes involved in political conflicts, and a revolutionary tricks him into helping bring about the downfall of the prince and princess. Amadea is accused of witchcraft and burned, and the prince is killed.

The woman of light turns Robert back into a coachman. Devastated by Amadea's death, he plans revenge. He summons an army of plague-infested rats using a recorder, and attacks.

Blinded by his rage, the plague spreads. Robert eventually drowns the rats with hopes of saving humanity. The narrative ends with his death; struck by the plague.

== Critical reaction ==
Kirkus called it "clever" and "well-handled," but "obvious". Pauline Morgan (Science Fiction Research Association Newsletter) found it "an allegory for the twentieth century" with the talking rat a curiosity and an outcast. It was also reviewed by Library Journal, which found it a "highly recommended" but somber portrait of "Europe on the verge of the Enlightenment", and by Locus.

== See also ==
- I Was a Rat!: or, The Scarlet Slippers, a 1999 novel with a similar premise
