= Hooray for Summer! =

Hooray for Summer! (ゆうだちのともだち, Yuudachi no tomodachi; Sudden rain friends) is a children's picture book made by Kazuo Iwamura. It was originally published in Japan in 1986 by Shiko-sha (至光社) under the title Paro・Piko・Poro no Yuudachi (ぱろ・ぴこ・ぽろのゆうだち, Paro, Piko, and Poro's sudden rain), but the 2002 Japanese reissue, done by the same company, uses the title Yuudachi no tomodachi. The English version was published in 2010 by North South Books.

Three squirrel siblings, named Mack, Mick, and Molly (the names in Japanese are Paro (ぱろ), Piko (ぴこ), and Poro (ぽろ)) befriend some mice in a cave after a thunderstorm drives the squirrels into one.

The three siblings were also in these Iwamura books that had English translations released in 2009: Hooray for Spring! (originally published in 1988) and Hooray for Snow!.

== Reception ==
Susan Dove Lempke, in The Horn Book, stated that the style of the work is "old-fashioned".

Lempke praised a two-page depiction of a thunderstorm as being "ingenious".

Kelly Roth of Bartow County Public Library wrote that the book is "A solid addition" to a library.

Reviewer John Peters states that the work is "scary but satisfying".
