= The Family of Fourteen =

Picture book series by Kazuo Iwamura

The Family of Fourteen, The 14 Forest Mice, or 14 Mice (14ひきのシリーズ, Jūyonhiki no shirīzu (Note: "hiki" is a measure word for smaller animals and so the Japanese title does not directly say what the animals are.)) is a series of children's picture books written and illustrated by Kazuo Iwamura, published originally in Japanese by Doshinsha. English-language versions of the books were published by Doshinsha in Japan, Gareth Stevens Publishing in the United States, and National Book Trust (NBT) in India.

There are twelve books in total in the Japanese version of the series. The only complete translation, La Famille Souris in French, is the set published in France. Irène Schwartz and Nicole Coulom adapted the books for French audiences in the 1980s, including changing cultural references in the text. There are translations of the series in other languages, but only some books are in each language. Babalibri is the name of the Italian version published in Italy.

== Characters ==
The Doshinsha English volumes use Japanese character names, as shown on the front cover. The Gareth Stevens volumes call the family the Woodmouse family and use different character names for the child characters.

Parents

- Dad (Doshinsha name) / Papa (Gareth Stevens name) (おとうさん Otousan)
- Mom (Doshinsha name) / Mama (Gareth Stevens name) (おかあさん Okaasan)
- Grandpa (おじいさん Ojiisan)
- Grandma (おばあさん Obaasan)

Children

- 1. Ikkun (いっくん) - Male
- 2. Nikkun (にっくん) - Male
- 3. Satchan (さっちゃん) - Female
- 4. Yotchan (よっちゃん) - Female
- 5. Goukun (ごうくん) - Male
- 6. Rokkun (ろっくん) - Male
- 7. Natchan (なっちゃん) - Female
- 8. Hakkun (はっくん) - Male
- 9. Kunchan (くんちゃん) - Female
- 10. Tokkun (とっくん) - Male

Gareth Stevens names for children characters (not in order) include Petunia, Peanut, Walnut, Cashew, Chestnut, Hickory, Pecan, Daisy, and Iris.

== Books ==
Books available in English:

Gareth Stevens Publishing - All translated and adapted by MaryLee Knowlton.

- The 14 Forest Mice and the Winter Sledding Day (14ひきのさむいふゆ, 14-hiki no samui fuyu) (ISBN 978-0-8368-0499-7)
- The 14 Forest Mice and the Spring Meadow Picnic (14ひきのぴくにっく, 14-hiki no Pikunikku) (Book #5, ISBN 978-0-8368-0498-0)
- The 14 Forest Mice and the Summer Laundry Day (14ひきのせんたく, 14-hiki no sentaku) (ISBN 978-0-8368-1147-6)
- The 14 Forest Mice and the Harvest Moon Watch (14ひきのおつきみ, 14-hiki no otsu kimi) (ISBN 978-0-8368-0497-3)

Doshinsha: - All translated by Arthur Binard , who is a poet. The books are sold in a five pack, ISBN 978-4-494-04190-9.

- The Family of Fourteen on the Move (14ひきのひっこし/, 14-hiki no hikkoshi) (ISBN 978-4-494-00780-6, August 24, 2008)
- The Family of Fourteen Go Picnicking (14ひきのぴくにっく, 14-hiki no Pikunikku) (originally released in Japanese in 1986) (ISBN 978-4-494-00782-0)
- The Family of Fourteen And the Moon (14ひきのおつきみ, 14-hiki no otsu kimi) (ISBN 978-4-494-00783-7)
- The Family of Fourteen Grow a Pumpkin (14ひきのかぼちゃ, 14-hiki no kabocha) (ISBN 978-4-494-00784-4)
- The Family of Fourteen Fix Breakfast (14ひきのあさごはん, 14-hiki no asa gohan) (ISBN 978-4-494-00781-3)

The blurb of the Indian English version of The Family of Fourteen on the Move stated that Iwamura's life in rural Japan gave inspiration to that book.

The Indian English version (ISBN 978-81-237-0054-0) is 14 Mice Move House, published by the National Book Trust in 1992. This title is also used in English to represent versions in other Indian languages. The Toyota Foundation had facilitated the Indian versions, which were first published circa 1993 and, at that time, sold for 11 Indian rupees, a subsidized price. The Indian versions are a part of the Nehru Bal Pustakalaya series.

Original Japanese ISBNs for books published in English:

- 14 Mice Move House/The Family of Fourteen on the Move (14ひきのひっこし) (July 10, 1983), ISBN 978-4-494-00618-2
- The Family of Fourteen Fix Breakfast (14ひきのあさごはん) (July 10, 1983), ISBN 978-4-494-00619-9
- The 14 Forest Mice and the Winter Sledding Day (14ひきのさむいふゆ) (November 1, 1985), ISBN 978-4-494-00627-4
- The 14 Forest Mice and the Spring Meadow Picnic / The Family of Fourteen Go Picnicking (14ひきのぴくにっく) (November 15, 1986), ISBN 978-4-494-00673-1
- The 14 Forest Mice and the Harvest Moon Watch / The Family of Fourteen And the Moon (14ひきのおつきみ) (June 25, 1988), ISBN 978-4-494-00683-0
- The 14 Forest Mice and the Summer Laundry Day (14ひきのせんたく) (May 25, 1990), ISBN 978-4-494-00695-3
- The Family of Fourteen Grow a Pumpkin (14ひきのかぼちゃ) (April 25, 1997) ISBN 978-4-494-00874-2

Books not published in English:

- 14ひきのやまいも (July 20, 1984), ISBN 978-4-494-00622-9
- 14ひきのあきまつり (October 3, 1992), ISBN 978-4-494-00857-5
- 14ひきのこもりうた (July 10, 1994), ISBN 978-4-494-00862-9
- 14ひきのとんぼいけ (June 30, 2002), ISBN 978-4-494-00898-8
- 14ひきのもちつき (November 15, 2007), ISBN 978-4-494-00795-0
