= Seven Little Mice Go to the Beach =

Seven Little Mice Go to the Beach (ねずみのかいすいよく, Nezumi no Kaisuiyoku; Mice swimming in the ocean) is a children's picture book written by Haruo Yamashita (山下 明生, Yamashita Haruo) and illustrated by Kazuo Iwamura, first published in Japan in 1987, by Child Honsha

There are three English editions. The first was published in 1987 by A&C Black as The Mouse Family Go to the Beach, with the English words by Peggy Blakeley (ISBN 978-0-7136-2800-5). The second was published in 1987 by William Morrow and Co.: as Mice at the Beach (ISBN 978-0-688-07064-9 and 978-0-688-07063-2). The third was published by NorthSouth Books as Seven Little Mice Go to the Beach in 2012.

In the story, the parents take their seven children to the beach. The parents take measures to keep the children safe. The father goes on a rock and falls asleep. He finds, after he awakens, that he is trapped by a higher tide, and he is unable to swim. The mother creates a plan to use the children to rescue the father.

The book has a color scheme of pastels along with pen and ink and watercolor artwork. Reviewer Martha Simpson of the Stratford Library Association of Stratford, Connecticut, examining the 2012 English edition for School Library Journal, stated that the artwork does "not convey much action."

== Reception ==
Freelance writer Sheila L. Weinstein reviewed the 1987 William Morrow edition in a syndicated article. She stated it is "A funny little book full of charm and sweetness."

Reviewer Barbara Hodge Hall of the Anniston Star stated that the 1987 William Morrow edition is "delightful" and "endearing".

Virginia Gleason, the librarian for children at the Springfield-Greene County Library Main Branch, described the 1987 William Morrow edition as "charming" in an article for the Springfield News-Leader.

Simpson, in regards to the NorthSouth version, praised the "delicate, quietly humorous", "cozy", and "meticulously detailed" artwork while she felt the ending "will leave readers underwhelmed". She stated that the child characters "have no personalities" and that the overall plotline "is not very interesting".
