= Kazuo Iwamura =

Japanese author (1939–2024)

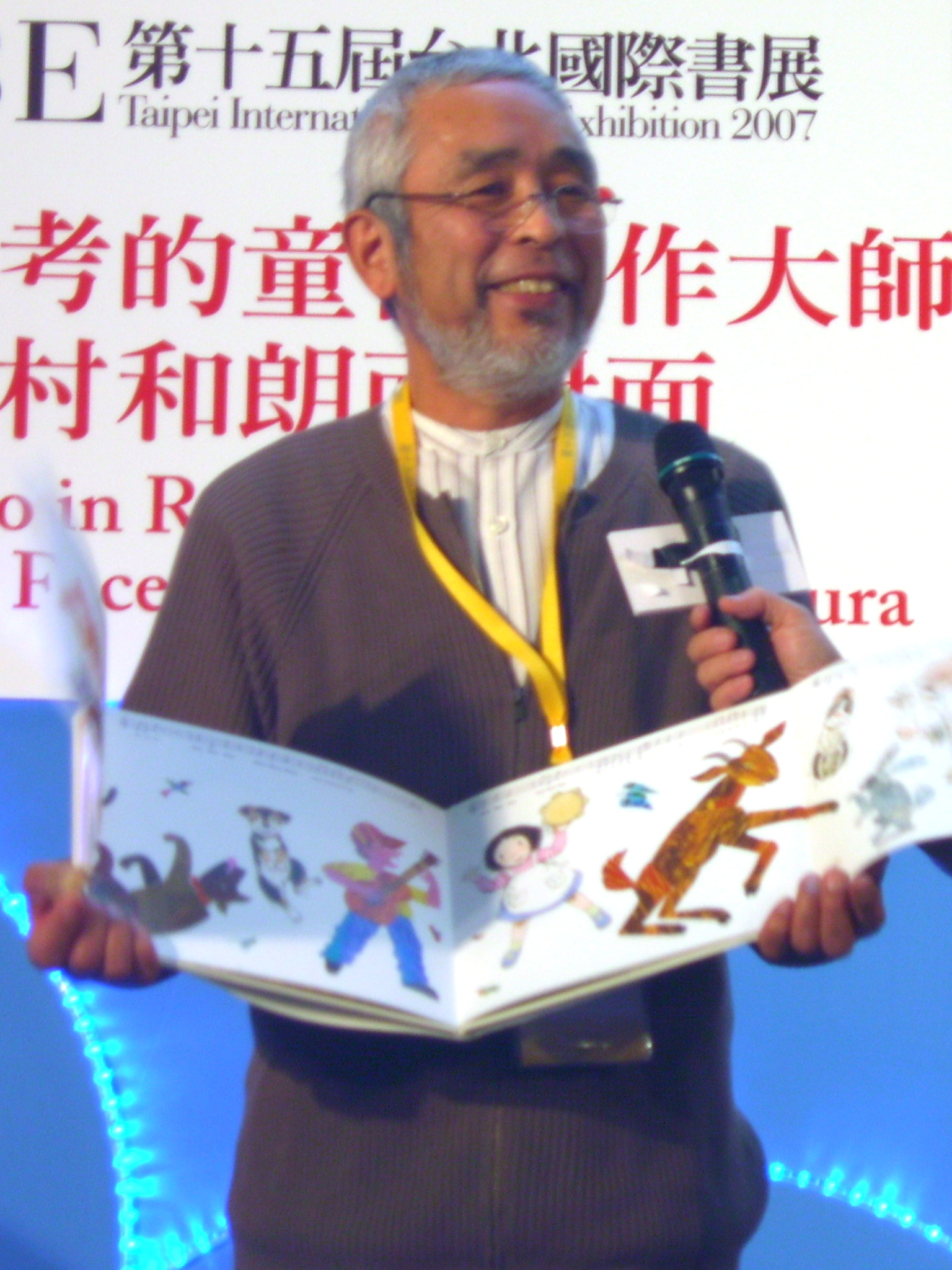
- Kazuo Iwamura at the 2007 Taipei International Book Exhibition
- Born: Kazuo Iwamura (岩村 和朗 Iwamura Kazuo); 3 April 1939; Tokyo, Japan
- Died: 19 December 2024 (aged 85)
- Occupation: Children's book author

Kazuo Iwamura (いわむらかずお, Iwamura Kazuo; Original kanji: 岩村 和朗, 3 April 1939 – 19 December 2024) was a children's book author.

The French newspaper Libération wrote that he was "well-known" ("mondialement connu") for his series of books about anthropomorphic mice.

== Biography ==
He resided in Mashiko, Tochigi.

Prior to his author career, he had positions at a cosmetic firm, and at NHK; in the former, he designed products, and in the latter, he made illustrations of programming for children.

In 2014 he received the French Chevalier des Arts et Lettres.

Kazuo Iwamura in 2017

He died on 19 December 2024. A funeral was held, and then his death was publicly announced on 22 January the following year. The company in France that published his works announced such publicly.

The Iwamura Kazuo Ehon-no-Oka Art Museum (いわむらかずお絵本の丘美術館) in Nakagawa, Tochigi chronicles his works.

== Works ==
=== Published in English ===
Seven Little Mice/The Mouse Family series

The writer is Haruo Yamashita (山下 明生, Yamashita Haruo), while Iwamura did the illustrations:

- A&C Black: The Mouse Family Go to the Beach
- William Morrow and Co.: Mice at the Beach
- NorthSouth Books: Seven Little Mice Go to School, Seven Little Mice Have Fun on the Ice, Seven Little Mice Go to the Beach

The Family of Fourteen/The 14 Forest Mice/14 Mice series

Squirrel series

- A&C Black: Deep in the Dark Wood, Autumn in the Dark Wood (まっかなせーたー, Makkana sētā) (English: 1984), Snow in the Dark Wood, Spring in the Dark Wood
- NorthSouth: Bedtime in the Forest, Good-Bye, Winter! Hello, Spring!, Hooray for Fall! (まっかなせーたー, Makkana sētā), Hooray for Snow!, Hooray for Spring!, Hooray for Summer!

Collaborations

- Scholastic Books: Where Are You Going? To See My Friend! (with Eric Carle)

Other

By Bradbury Press in the US and Kestrel Books in the UK: Tan Tan series (Nat in the UK)

- Ton and Pon: Big and Little (1984, ISBN 978-0-02-747480-0)
- Ton and Pon: Two Good Friends (1984)
  - Holly Ristau of New Ulm Public Library of New Ulm, Minnesota reviewed both books in School Library Journal. She stated that the books are "simple", that Two Good Friends has a "more developed plot" than Big and Little, and that the drawings in the latter are "colorful, humorous".

== Honors and awards ==
- Knight of Ordre des Arts et des Lettres, December 2014
