= Hooray for Snow! =

Hooray for Snow! (ゆきのひはあついあつい, Yuki no hiha atsui atsui) is a children's picture book made by Kazuo Iwamura. The original Japanese book was published in 1983 by Shiko-sha (至光社).

There have been two English language versions published:

- Snow in the Dark Wood, with its English text by Peggy Blakeley was published in 1983
- Hooray for Snow! was published in 2009 by North South Books.

Three squirrel siblings, named Mack, Mick, and Molly (Note: They are named Mack, Mick, and Molly in the North South version and Eric, Derek, and Daisy in the A&C Black version. The names in Japanese are Paro (ぱろ), Piko (ぴこ), and Poro (ぽろ).), experience the winter.

== Reception ==
Kirkus Reviews gave a positive review of the 2009 translation, describing it as "entirely refreshing".

Publishers Weekly, reviewing the 2009 translation, wrote that the author had "a talent for imagining what the world looks like to small creatures."
