= A Couple of Poor, Polish-Speaking Romanians =

2006 play by Dorota Masłowska

A Couple of Poor, Polish- Speaking Romanians
- Original language: Polish
- Written by: Dorota Masłowska

Premiere
- Place: TR Warszawa

A Couple of Poor, Polish-Speaking Romanians (Polish: Dwoje biednych Rumunów mówiących po polsku) is a 2006 play by Dorota Masłowska. Its first staging was at TR Warszawa, and an English translation by Lisa Goldman and Paul Sirett was first performed in English at the Soho Theatre in London on February 28, 2008. In 2011, a translation of the play by Benjamin Paloff was performed in New York.

== Playwright ==
Masłowska is a novelist, playwright, and musician, who attended Gdańsk University and Warsaw University at Warsaw, where she majored in cultural studies and started writing poems and novels. She became known for her style of writing with Snow White and Russian Red (2002) which used vulgar language and touched on controversial topics. Her next novel Queen’s Spew came out in 2006, later in 2006, came her first plays, A Couple of Poor, Polish-Speaking Romanians (2006) and No Matter How Hard We Tried (2008). After writing these plays, Masłowska released another novel Honey, I Killed Our Cats and, in 2014 released a music album called Spoleczenstwo jest niemile, The Society Is Mean.

== Background ==
When first staged A Couple of Poor, Polish Speaking Romanians was poorly received and unsuccessful. After being translated, the play was produced several times and was understood better. About A Couple of Poor, Polish Speaking Romanians, Masłowska said:

"It is a short play, filled with humor and a whole lot of gags. Two really nice protagonists, acting on mysterious impulses, set off on an unintentionally frantic quest through Poland. It is a quest full of comic adventures, which over time turn out to be no joke, quite the opposite in fact, utterly no joke, indeed, quite tragic. The audience has to consider the fact that the play is not as lighthearted as it seems; its characters do not represent positive social or psychological models, and this journey doesn't have to be a life quest at all. Quite the contrary."

== Past productions ==
- 2006 Teatr Rozmaitości w Warszawie (staged)
- 2008 Soho Theatre, London
- 2010 Trap Door Theatre, Chicago
- 2010 Theatre on the Balustrade (Divadlo na Zabradli), Prague
- 2011 Abrons Arts Center, New York City (translated by Benjamin Paloff)

== Characters and Soho cast ==
- Parcha: Andrew Tiernan
- Dzina: Andrea Riseborough
- Driver & Mr Wiesiek: Howard Ward
- Bartender: Valerie Lilley
- Woman Driver Ishia Bennison
- Old Man: John Rogan
- Policeman
- Halina
- Waiter
- Man 1, 2, 3
- Woman 1, 2
- Crew/ Passengers

== Plot ==
Parcha tries to convince a driver to give him and his pregnant wife Dzina a lift to Wroclaw. The driver refuses to take them anywhere as they are both drunk and mentally unsound. Parcha pulls out a penknife and forces the driver to let them ride.

Parcha and Dzina begin to smoke in the car and make fun of the driver. It is revealed that they are not married and Dzina does not know who the father of her child really is. The driver sees a policeman, pulls over, and asks the policeman to arrest him. Parcha tells the policeman that the driver is his father and isn't quite sure where he is going, but they are looking for the coal barge called The Ibuprofen. Parcha pays for the ride with five thousand dollars and an MP3 player. Parcha and Dzina leave the cab and walk on the side of the road, having nonsensical conversations. They find their way to a bar called The Welcome Grill.

Dzina comes into the bar exclaiming that she needs boiling water because she's having her baby. Parcha says she is not really pregnant, but has a pillow under her shirt. Dzina and Parcha fight about Dzina abandoning her son somewhere. Parcha demands to use the phone, but has no money. A man named Wiesiek offers to help them. Parcha and Dzina continue to argue about their son.

They walk to a field, where they find a drunk woman drinking outside her car. Parcha and Dzina jump onto the hood of the women's car. They learn that the woman is from Warsaw and she agrees to drive them. The woman gets angry because Parcha doesn't have a license with him. They have more absurd conversations, similar to those from earlier. The woman gets a call from her husband, who is worried she is going to crash. They end up crashing into a wild boar, injuring the woman. Parcha and Dzina steal her watch and go through her bag, but only find contraceptive pills.

They set off on foot again until they come to a house. They knock on the door and an old man lets them in. Parcha asks to use the man's phone, but he has no phone. Dzina asks if they can stay the night and the old man agrees. In the bedroom of the house, Parcha continues to wonder where he left his phone and Dzina talks about making money from prostitution. Parcha tells her she need to find someone who will treat her right and asks if she has been tested for HIV. She asks if he can lend her five hundred dollars. Dzina gets up to use the bathroom and hangs herself. Parcha finds her still alive. She continues to talk and Parcha leaves. Dzina cuts herself down and runs after him.

They board the coal barge Ibuprofen. Parcha orders dinner and goes to the bathroom to wash his hands, where he finds Dzina dead from hanging herself.

== Critical response ==
The 2008 performance at the Soho Theatre, London, received varying reviews, and a suggestion that the play may have been better understood in Poland. A 2011 performance at the Abrons Arts Center in New York, with translation by Benjamin Paloff, was given two out of five stars by Time Out. The New York Times and Time Out both asserted that aspects of the play may have meant more to a Polish audience.

== Publication ==
- Masłowska, Dorota (2008). A Couple of Poor, Polish-Speaking Romanians. Translated by Sirett, Paul; Goldman, Lisa. London: Oberon Books. ISBN 978-1840028461.
