= Bedtime in the Forest =

Bedtime in the Forest (よるのともだち, Yoru no Tomodachi; Night friends) is a 1982 children's picture book made by Kazuo Iwamura. It was originally published in Japan by Shiko-sha (至光社). The original draft/concept/plan of the book was developed by Masuko Miura (三浦 万寿子, Miura Masuko).

The first English version was published by A&C Black as Deep in the Dark Wood in September 1982 (ISBN 0-7136-2248-2), with Peggy Blakely as the writer of the English text. Another English version, Bedtime in the Forest, was published in 2010 by NorthSouth Books.

Three squirrel siblings, named Mack, Mick, and Molly (Note: They are named Mack, Mick, and Molly in the North South version and Eric, Derek, and Daisy in the A&C Black version. The names in Japanese are Paro (ぱろ), Piko (ぴこ), and Poro (ぽろ).), try to play with owl children, but their activity times, day and night, conflict. Mack, Mick, and Molly resolve to create a mailbox so they can interact.

The coloring and brightness of day and night scenes are different, with yellows for day and blues for night, and day scenes brighter than night scenes.

== Reception ==
In Margery Fisher's magazine Growing Point, she stated that in Deep in the Dark Wood (the 1982 translation), the different brightness levels are "skilfully [sic] contrasted" and that young readers who prefer seeing anthropomorphic characters "may find the book congenial."

Kirkus Reviews gave a positive review to the 2010 translation, citing the "gentle story" and the "muted" colors, and compared the book to works by Beatrix Potter.

Linda Perkins of Booklist wrote that the 2010 translation is "Short and gentle", catering well to its readership, and she praised the "Delicate" artwork.

Elaine Lesh Morgan, who previously worked for the Multnomah County Library, praised the "unpretentious story" and "lovely" illustrations in the 2010 translation. Morgan praised how Mack, Mick, and Molly create the resolution to their dilemma.
