= Nasu Ogawa Kofun Cluster =

Groups of burial mounds in Nakagawa, Japan

- 那須小川古墳群 (Japanese)
- Location within Tochigi Prefecture Location within Japan
- 36°45′41″N 140°07′16″E
- Type: kofun groups
- Periods: Kofun period
- Location: Nakagawa, Tochigi, Japan
- Region: Kantō region

History
- Built: late 4th century AD

Site notes
- Public access: Yes

The Nasu Ogawa Kofun Cluster (那須小川古墳群) is the collective designation for three separate groups of kofun burial mounds located in the town of Nakagawa in Tochigi Prefecture in the northern Kantō region of Japan. The Komagata Ōtsuka Kofun within this cluster received protection as a National Historic Site in 1979, and the other groups were added in 2002.

== Overview ==
The Nasu Ogawa Kofun Cluster were built near the Gozu River, a tributary of the Naka River in the Nasu region of northern Tochigi during the 4th century. The sites are located about 1 hour and 30 minutes by car from JR Tōhoku Shinkansen Utsunomiya Station.The cluster consists of the following:

=== Komagata Ōtsuka Kofun (駒形大塚古墳) ===
This keyhole-shaped kofun has a total length of 64 meters. The circular portion has a diameter of 16 meters. The rectangular portion has a length of 32 meters, with of 30 meters and height of 8 meters. It was covered in fukiishi. The tumulus was excavated in 1974, and was found to contain a burial chamber with a wooden casket with length of 3.2 meters and width of 75 centimeters. Many grave goods were recovered, including earthenware, bronze mirrors, two knives, an iron ax, sword, as well as copper and glass ornaments. The kofun became a nationally designated historic site on March 13, 1979 and is currently maintained as Komagata Park. 36°45′42″N 140°7′14″E

=== Yoshida Onsen Jinja Kofun group (吉田温泉神社古墳群) ===
This group of tumuli consisted of one cojoined-square kofun (named the Yoshida Onsen Jinja Kofun) and twenty square kofun, of which only four have survived. The Yoshida Onsen Jinja Kofun was built around the end of the 4th century, the early Kofun period, but the rear part has been cut away. A Shinto shrine was built on the remaining mound, thus accounting for the name of this tumulus. Based on several surveys, the tumulus has a total length of 47 meters. The rear portion measured 25 meters by 21 meters, and the width of the portion joining the two mounds was 10 meters. The tumulus was surrounded by a moat. Grave goods included earthenware, an iron sword, and an iron ax, but no fukiishi were detected. The foundations of a pit dwelling measuring eight meters in diameter, with an altar-like step about 25 cm in height on the east side wall, was found, indicating that this was a ceremonial structure. 36°45′00.0″N 140°8′2.5″E

=== Nasu Hachimanzuka Kofun group (那須八幡塚古墳群) ===
This group consists of two tumuli. The Nasu Hachimanzuka Kofun is a cojoined-square kofun with a length of 62 meters. It was built on a river terrace on the west bank of the Naka River. They rear portion has width of 31 meters and height of 6 meters, and the front portion has a width of 17 meters. The tumulus was covered in fukiishi, and was surrounded by a mounded terrace and irregular moat. In an excavation conducted in 1952, the burial chamber with a split bamboo-shaped wooden casket with clay blocks on both ends in the east and west was confirmed one meter below the summit of the rear portion. Grave goods included bronze mirrors, iron swords, iron ax, knives, and sickle. The walls of the burial chamber were covered with vermilion. It is believed that this kofun was built in the latter half of the 4th century from the earthenware discovered, and it is considered to postdate the Komagata Ōtsuka Kofun and Yoshida Onsen Shrine Kofun.

The Yoshida Fujiyama Kofun (吉田富士山古墳) is a trapezoidal kofun measuring 7 meters on each side except for the south, which is 8.5 meters. The tumulus is 8.5 meters high. Two pit dwellings older than the burial mound have been excavated nearby. 36°44′43.3″N 140°08′09.5″E

== See also ==
- List of Historic Sites of Japan (Tochigi)
