= Tan Tan (children's book series) =

Children's book series by Kazuo Iwamura

Tan Tan (タンタン) is a children's book character by Kazuo Iwamura, appearing in a single book series. There are four books total, published by Kaisei-sha in Japan, featuring this character.

He appears in two books that were published in English: Tan Tan's Suspenders (タンタンのずぼん, Tantan no zubon; Tantan's trousers/pants), first published in Japan in 1976, and Tan Tan's Hat (タンタンのぼうし, Tantan no bōshi), published in Japan in 1978. These books were published in American English in 1983 by Bradbury Press (ISBN 978-0-02-747500-5 for Suspenders and ISBN 978-0-02-747490-9 for Hat, January 1, 1983). In the United Kingdom the character was renamed Nat. The books, published in 1982 by Kestrel Books with Kaye Webb doing the English text, accordingly are titled Nat's Braces (ISBN 978-0-7226-5769-0) and Nat's Hat.

Two books were never published in English: Tan Tan's Handkerchief (タンタンのハンカチ, 1981) and Tan Tan's Polar Bear (タンタンのしろくまくん, 1984).

Reviewer R. B. of The Junior Bookshelf wrote that Tan Tan is "unidentifiable but endearing".

== Reception ==
Marge Louch-Wouters of La Crosse Public Library reviewed both American version books in School Library Journal. She argued that there is a "tedious sameness" in the artwork and that Tan Tan is "bland". She concluded, "Tan Tan is no Curious George."

In The School Librarian, reviewer Cliff Moon, who read the British versions, stated that both books each had "a real story" while having "very few words" and allowed young readers to predict what could happen next. Moon's review was positive.

Reviewer R. B. overall praised the Nat's Braces book as "cheerful and charming".

== Books ==
Japanese versions

- 『タンタンのずぼん』Kaisei-sha, December 1976, 000001319674
- 『タンタンのぼうし』Kaisei-sha, January 1978, 000001362317
- 『タンタンのハンカチ』Kaisei-sha, August 1981, ISBN 4-03-215280-2
- 『タンタンのしろくまくん』Kaisei-sha, August 1984, ISBN 4-03-215310-8
