= Dorota Masłowska =

Polish writer

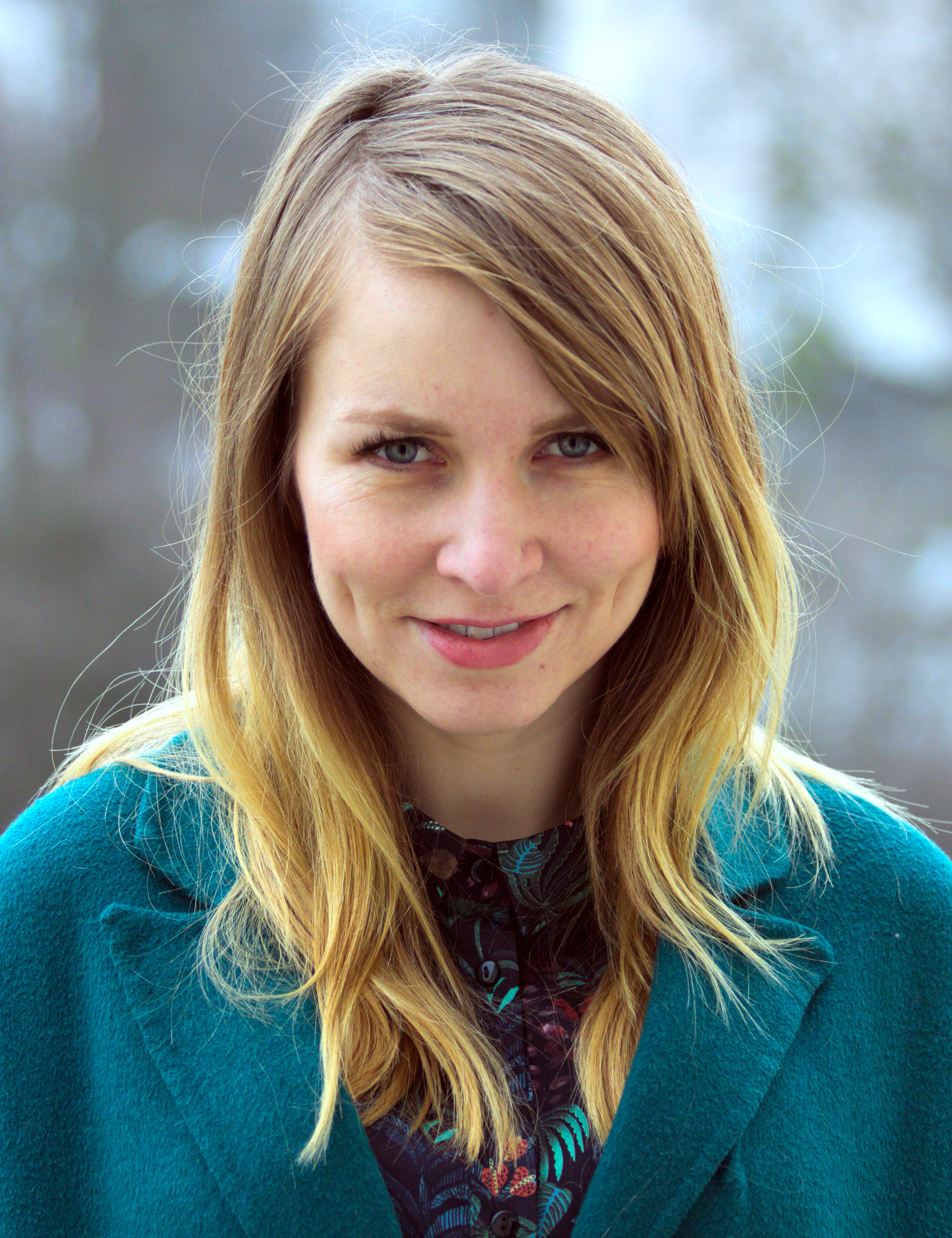
- Masłowska in 2018
- Born: 3 July 1983 (age 43); Wejherowo, Gdańsk Voivodeship, Polish People's Republic
- Occupations: writer, playwright, columnist, journalist
- Awards: Paszport Polityki (2002); Nike Award (2006)

Signature
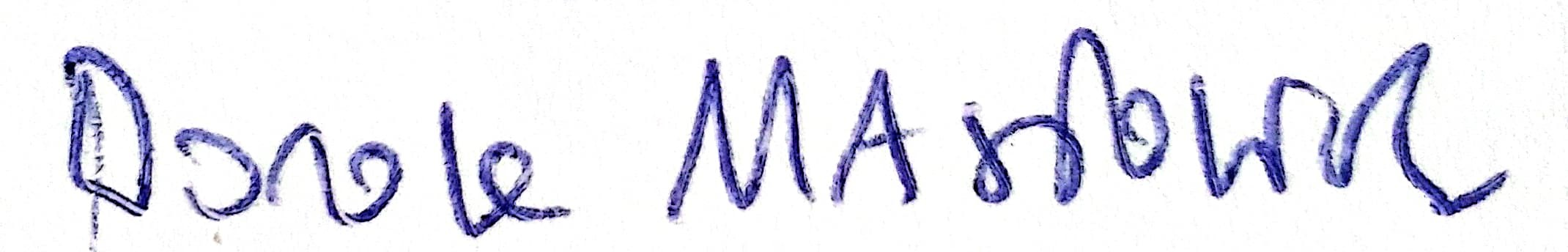

Dorota Masłowska (Polish pronunciation:[dɔˈrɔta maˈswɔfska]; born 3 July 1983) is a Polish writer, playwright, columnist and journalist. In 2006 she obtained the Nike Award for her novel The Queen's Peacock.

== Life and work ==
Masłowska was born in Wejherowo, and grew up there. She applied for the University of Gdańsk's faculty of psychology and was accepted, but left the studies for Warsaw, where she joined the culture studies at the Warsaw University. She first appeared in the mass-media when her debut book Wojna polsko-ruska pod flagą biało-czerwoną (translated to English as either White and Red in the UK or Snow White and Russian Red in the US; literally means Polish-Russian War under White-Red Flag) was published. Largely controversial, mostly because of the language seen by many as vulgar, cynical and simple, the book was praised by many intellectuals as innovative and fresh. Among the most active supporters of Masłowska were Marcin Świetlicki and Polityka weekly staff, most notably renowned writer Jerzy Pilch. A notable example of post-modernist literature, her book became a best-seller in Poland and won Masłowska several notable awards as well as general support among the critics. It was almost immediately translated into several languages, including French, German, Spanish, Italian, Dutch, Russian, English, Hungarian, Czech and Lithuanian, and won the Deutscher Jugendliteraturpreis.

Her second novel Paw królowej (The Queen's Peacock) did not gain similar popularity, even though it won the NIKE Literary Award in 2006. As of 2009, Dorota Masłowska's permanent residence is in Kraków. In 2009, she resided in Berlin on a German Academic Exchange Service stipend. She has collaborated with a number of magazines, most notably the Przekrój and Wysokie Obcasy weeklies, as well as Lampa monthly and the quarterly B EAT magazine.

Her first play, Dwoje biednych Rumunów mówiących po polsku (A Couple of Poor, Polish-Speaking Romanians), has been translated by Lisa Goldman and Paul Sirett and was performed for the first time in the UK at Soho Theatre from 28 February – 29 March 2008 with a cast featuring Andrew Tiernan, Andrea Riseborough, Howard Ward, Valerie Lilley, Ishia Bennison, John Rogan and Jason Cheater. Neither Goldman nor Sirett know Polish and based their adaptation on a technical translation and a line by line translation with Dorota Maslowska in London in 2007. An American translation of the play by Benjamin Paloff was commissioned by TR Warszawa in 2007 and has been performed in New York. Dorota Maslowska in October 2015 was awarded the Bronze Medal for Merit to Culture – Gloria Artis.

== Works ==
- 2002: Wojna polsko-ruska pod flagą biało-czerwoną. Warsaw: Lampa i Iskra Boża, ISBN 83-86735-87-2 (UK edition: White and Red, Atlantic Books, ISBN 1-84354-423-7; US edition: Snow White and Russian Red, Grove Press, ISBN 0-8021-7001-3)
- 2005: Paw królowej. Warsaw: Lampa i Iskra Boża, ISBN 83-89603-20-9 (no English translation announced yet)
- 2006: Dwoje biednych Rumunów mówiących po polsku. Warsaw: Lampa i Iskra Boża, ISBN 83-89603-41-1. Translated into English as A Couple of Poor, Polish-Speaking Romanians, by Lisa Goldman and Paul Sirett, Oberon Books Ltd (29 Feb 2008), ISBN 1-84002-846-7, ISBN 978-1-84002-846-1. Staged at Soho Theatre, London, between 28 February – 29 March 2008.
- 2008: Między nami dobrze jest ("All's Good Between Us"), drama
- 2010: Schneeweiß und Russenrot, drama
- 2012: Kochanie, zabiłam nasze koty ("Honey, I Killed Our Cats"), novel
- 2013: Dusza światowa – interview with Agnieszką Drotkiewicz
- 2014: Jak zostałam wiedźmą: opowieść autobiograficzna dla dorosłych i dzieci
- 2017: Jak przejąć kontrolę nad światem, nie wychodząc z domu
- 2018: Inni ludzie, novel
- 2020: Jak przejąć kontrolę nad światem 2
- 2022: Bowie w Warszawie, play
- 2023: Mam tak samo jak ty
- 2024: Magiczna rana, novel

== Discography ==
- Społeczeństwo jest niemiłe (2014, as Mister D.)
