= Shimotsuke Kokubun-ji =

Buddhist temple in Japan

- 下野国分寺
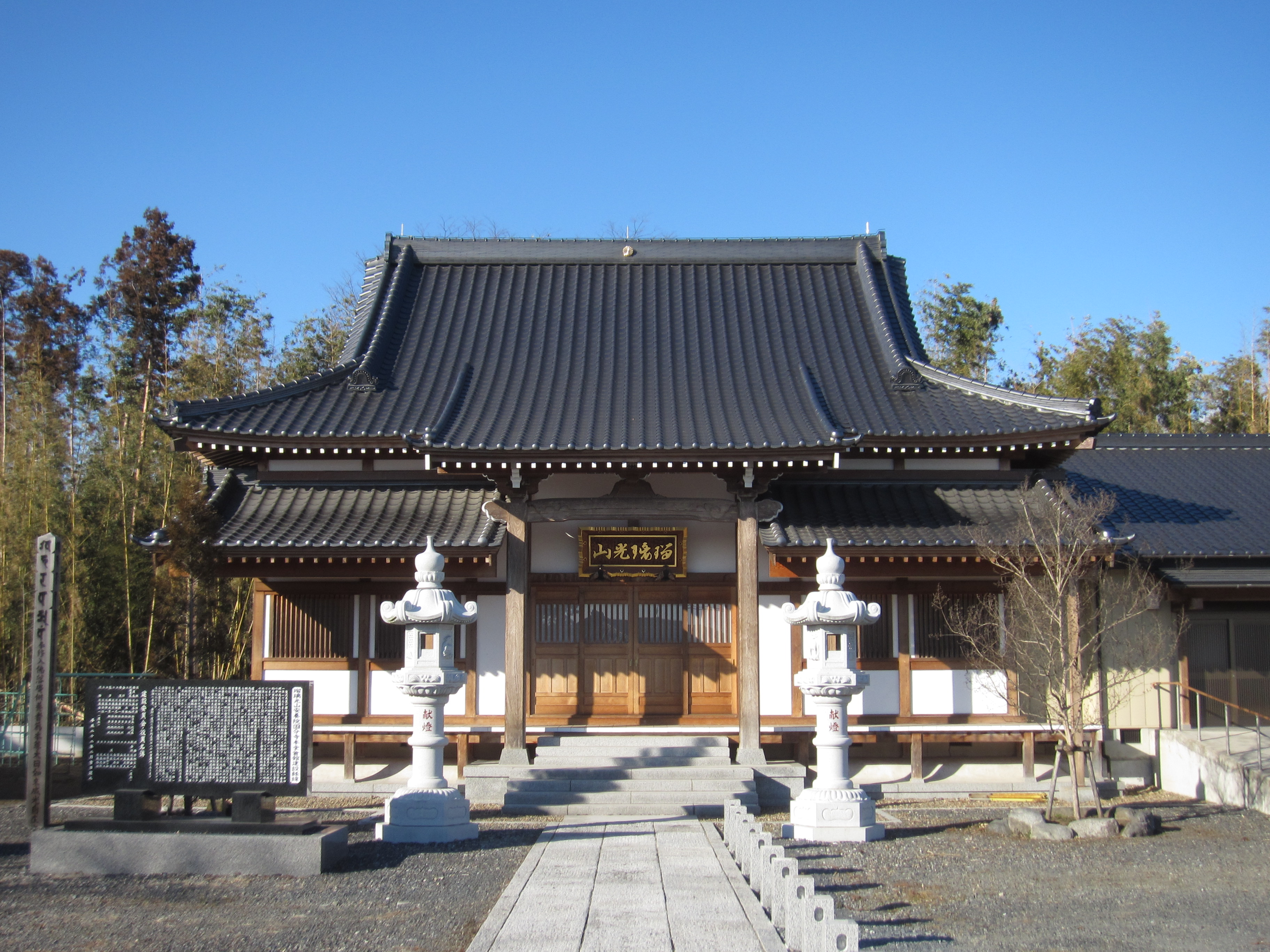
- Shimotsuke Kokubun-ji Hondo

- Shimotsuke Kokubun-ji Shimotsuke Kokubun-ji (Japan)

Religion
- Affiliation: Buddhist
- Deity: Dainichi Nyorai
- Rite: Shingon-shu Buzan-ha
- Status: active

Location
- Location: Shimotsuke-shi, Tochigi-ken
- Country: Japan
- Interactive map of Shimotsuke Kokubun-ji
- Coordinates: 36°23′08″N 139°48′23″E

Architecture
- Founder: Emperor Shōmu
- Completed: 741AD
- National Historic Site of Japan

Shimotsuke Kokubun-ji (下野国分寺) is a Buddhist temple in the city of Shimotsuke, Tochigi Prefecture, Japan. It belongs to the Shingon-shū Buzan-ha sect and its honzon is a statue of Dainichi Nyorai. It is the provincial temple ("kokubunji") of former Shimotsuke Province. The present temple is of uncertain foundation, but claims to be the direct descendant of the original Nara period kokubunji temple which fell into ruins sometime in the Kamakura period. The Nara-period temple ruins were designated a National Historic Site in 1921, and the area under protection was expanded in 2005.

== Overview ==
The Shoku Nihongi records that in 741 AD, as the country recovered from a major smallpox epidemic, Emperor Shōmu ordered that a state-subsidized monastery and nunnery be established in every province for the promotion of Buddhism and to enhance political unification per the new ritsuryō system. These were the kokubunji (国分寺). The temples were constructed per a more-or-less standardized template, and were each to be staffed by twenty clerics who would pray for the state's protection. The associated provincial nunneries (kokubunniji) were on a smaller scale, each housing ten nuns to pray for the atonement of sins. This system declined when the capital was moved from Heijō-kyō (modern Nara) to Heian-kyō (modern Kyoto) in 794 AD.

== Shimotsuke Kokubun-ji ==
The Shimotsuke Kokubun-ji was located on a fluvial terrace on the left bank of the Omoi River. On the opposing bank was the site of Shimotsuke Provincial Capital and the Shimotsuke Kokubun-niji, and about seven kilometers to the northeast was the Shimotsuke Yakushi-ji. The surrounding area is also rich in Kofun period remains, including the Azuma Kofun, Biwazuka Kofun and Marishitenzuka Kofun.

The original design of the temple was an area 457 meters north-south by 413 meters east-west, surrounded by an earthen wall. Per archaeological excavations conducted from 1982, the layout and extent of the temple was confirmed. The temple follows the standardized template with a large South Gate, Middle Gate, Kondō, Lecture Hall, Cloisters, Rectory and seven-story Pagoda, Kyōzō, Shōrō, Kuri, and dormitory.

The temple was reconstructed three times after its completion around 741 AD. The first time was at the end of the 8th century to early 9th century. The second time was at the end of the 9th century, when the scale of the temple was reduced, and its outer clay wall abandoned in favor of a moat with a wooden palisade. The third time was at the end of the 10th century, when the buildings were repaired rather than completely rebuilt, and the moat was filled in. The temple disappeared from history sometime in 11th to 12th century.

Artifacts found during excavations are stored and displayed at the a museum on site. The ruins are about five minutes by car from Koganei Station on the JR East Tōhoku Main Line.

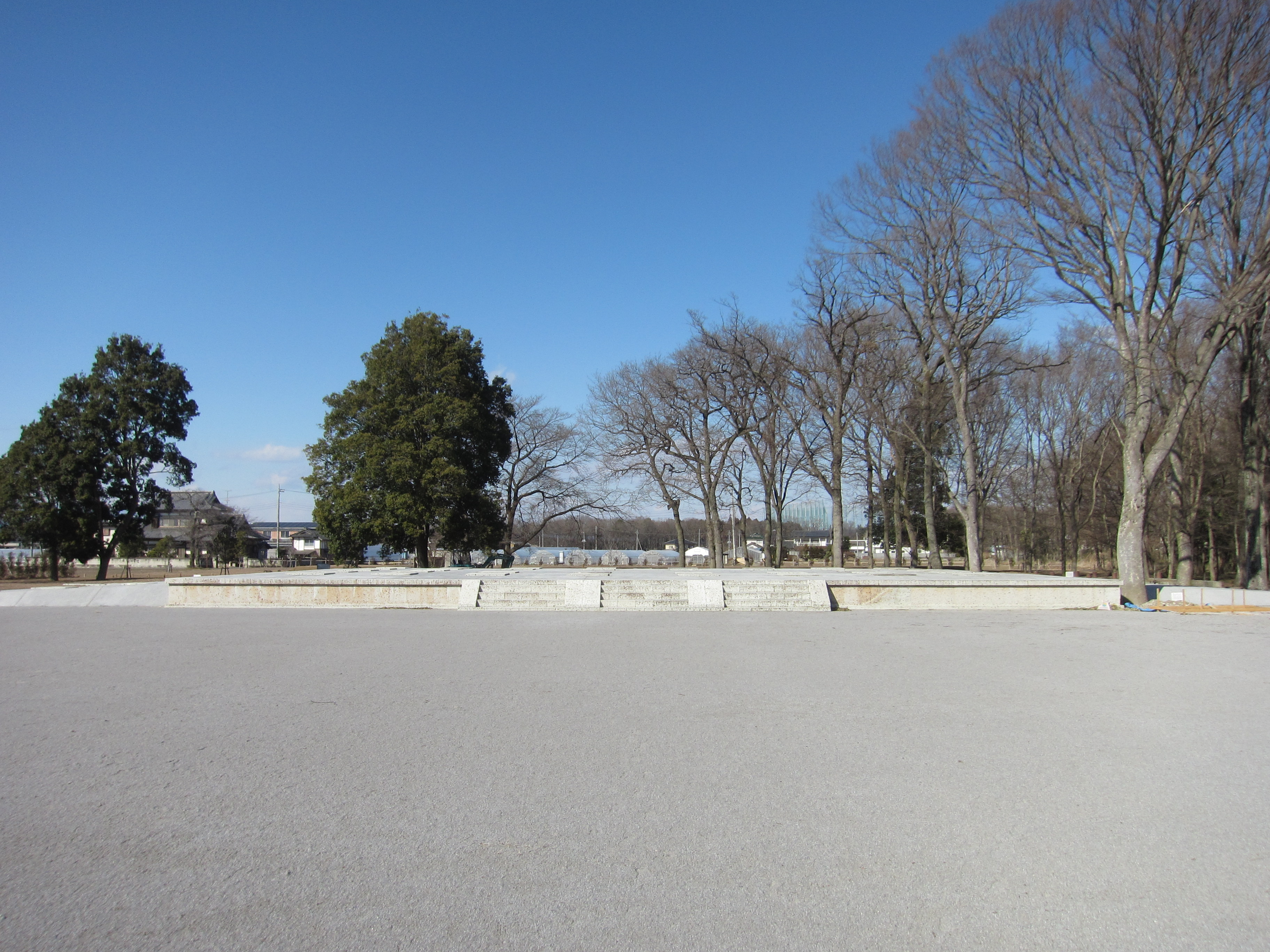
site of the Kondō

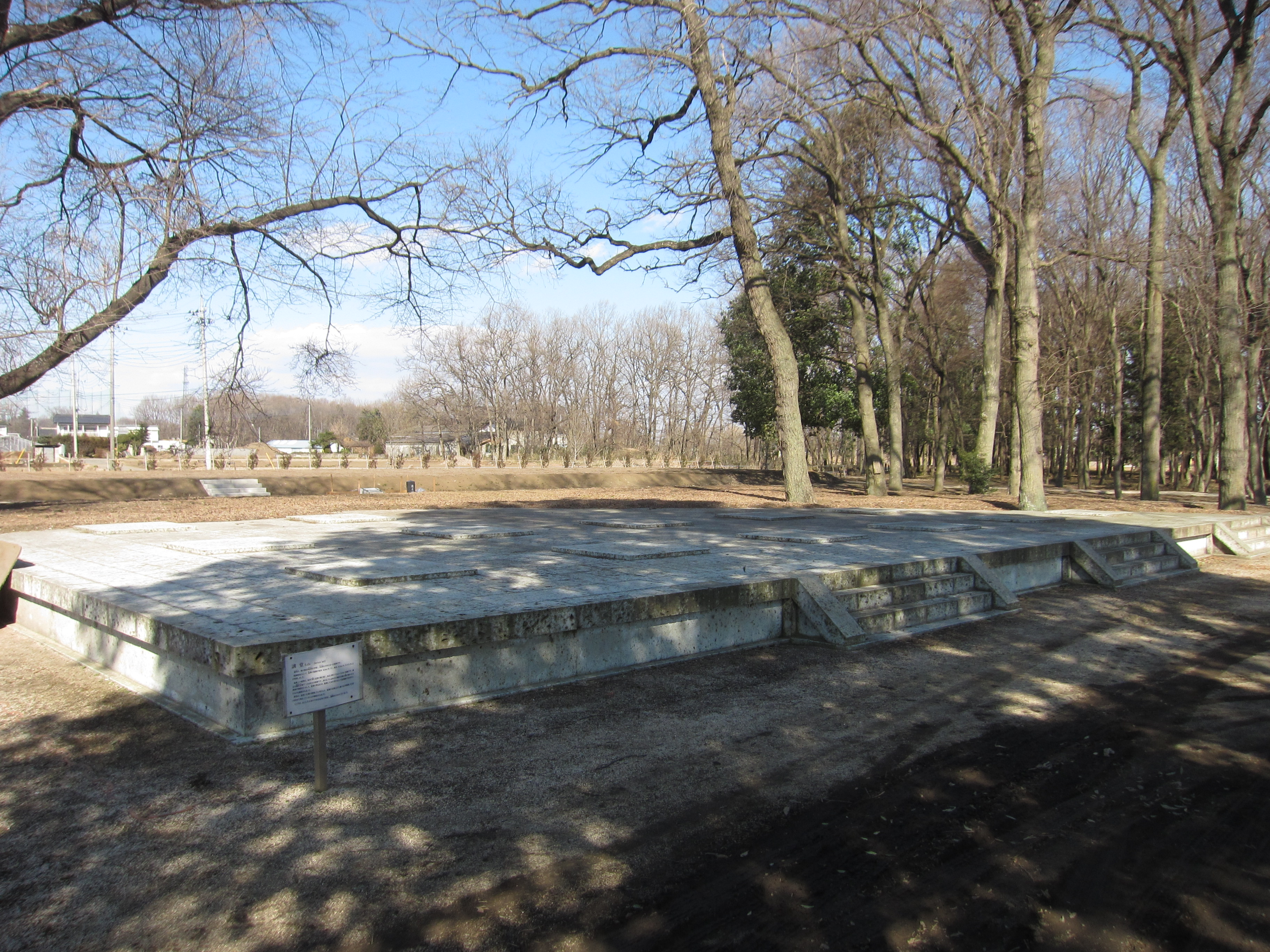
site of the Lecture Hall

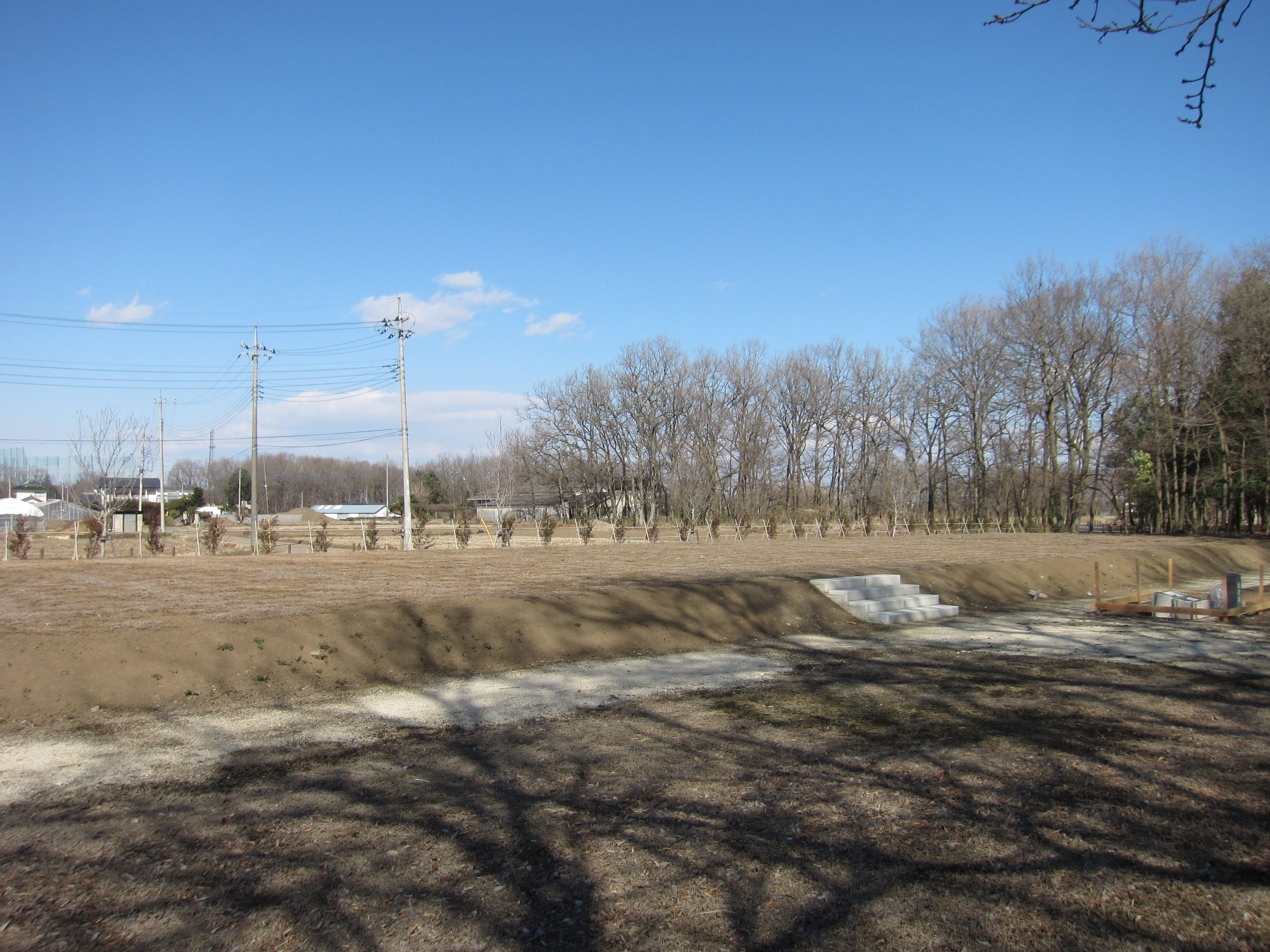
site of the rectory

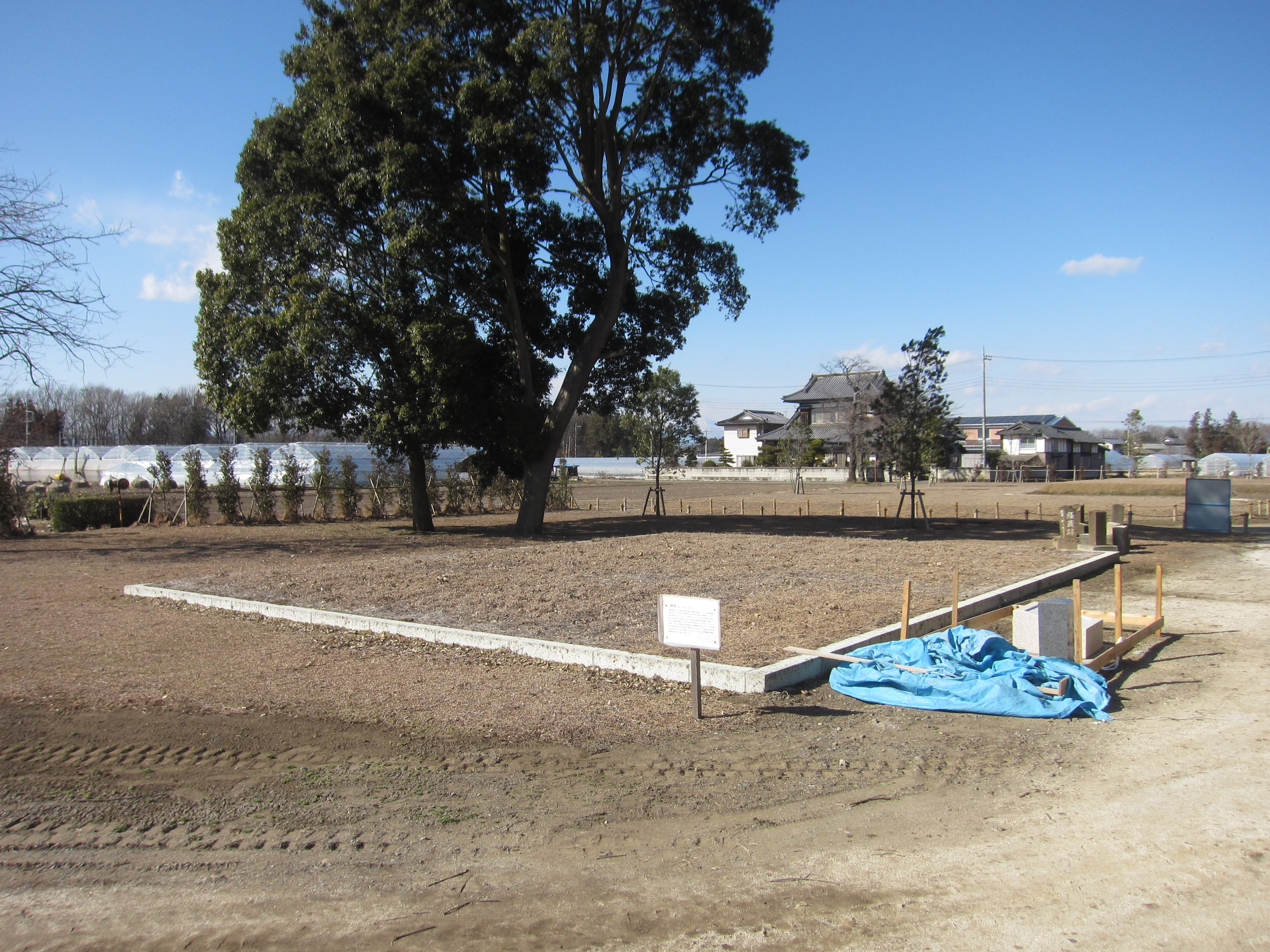
site of the Belfry

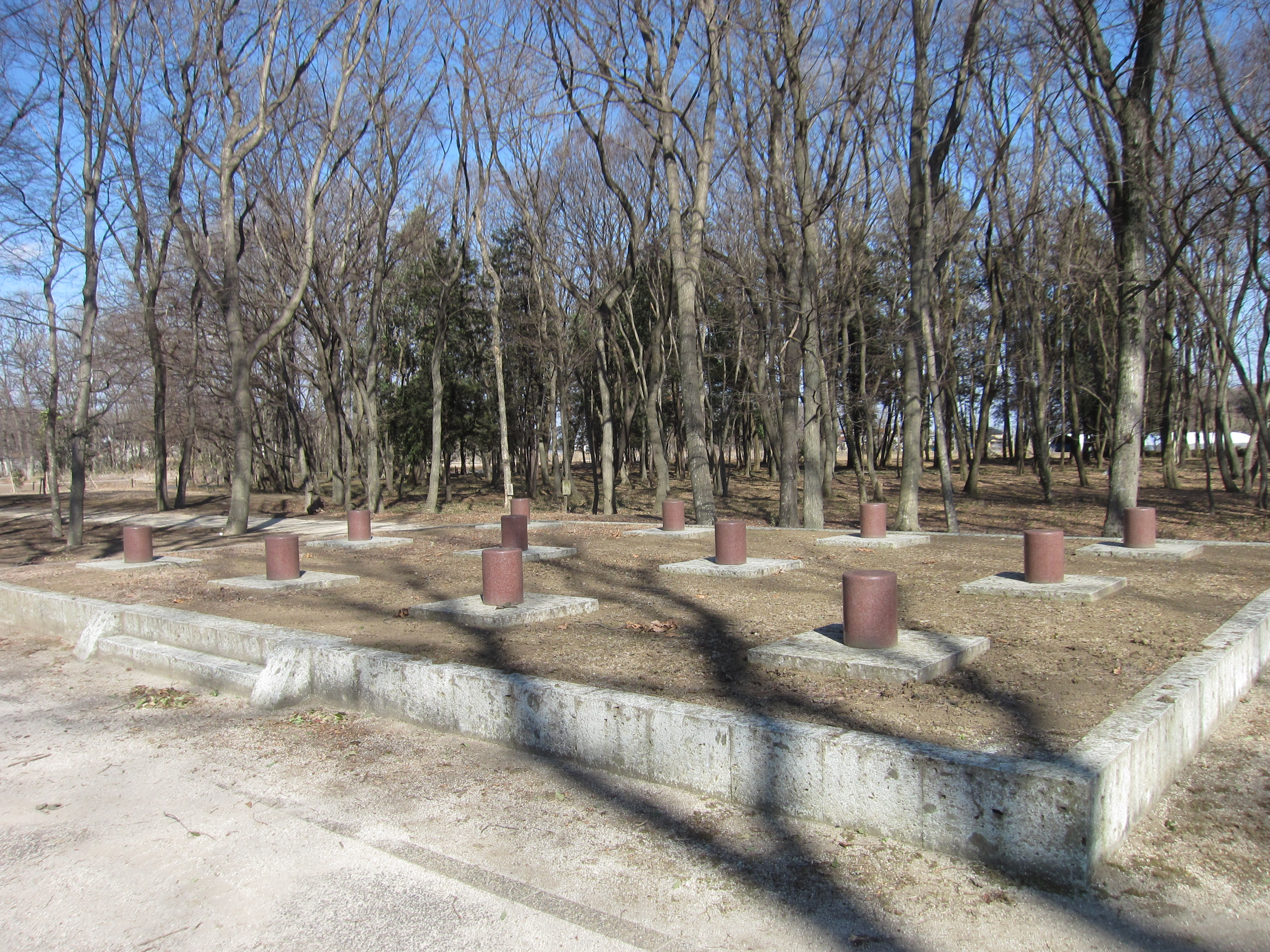
site of the Kyōzō

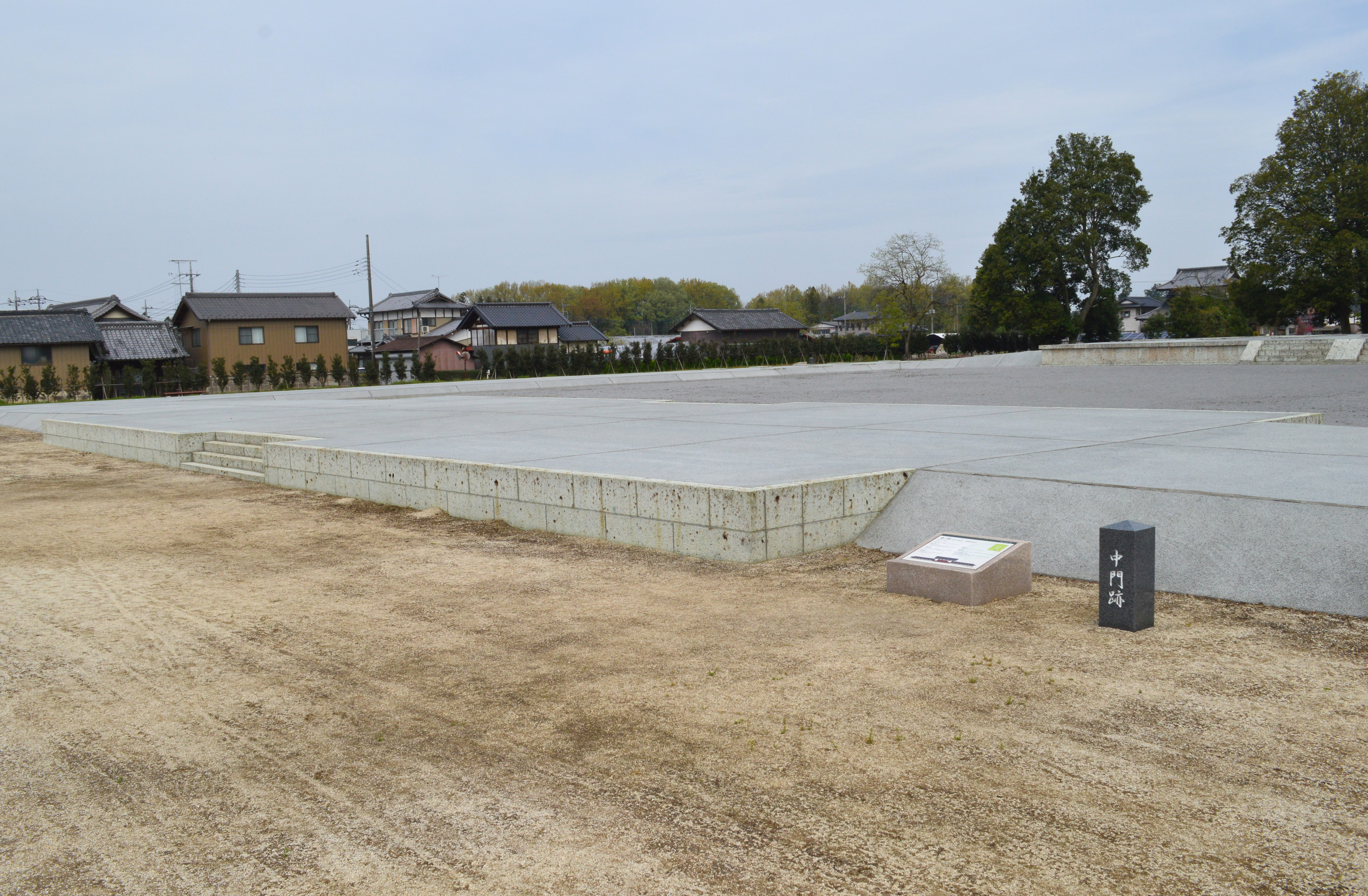
site of the Middle Gate

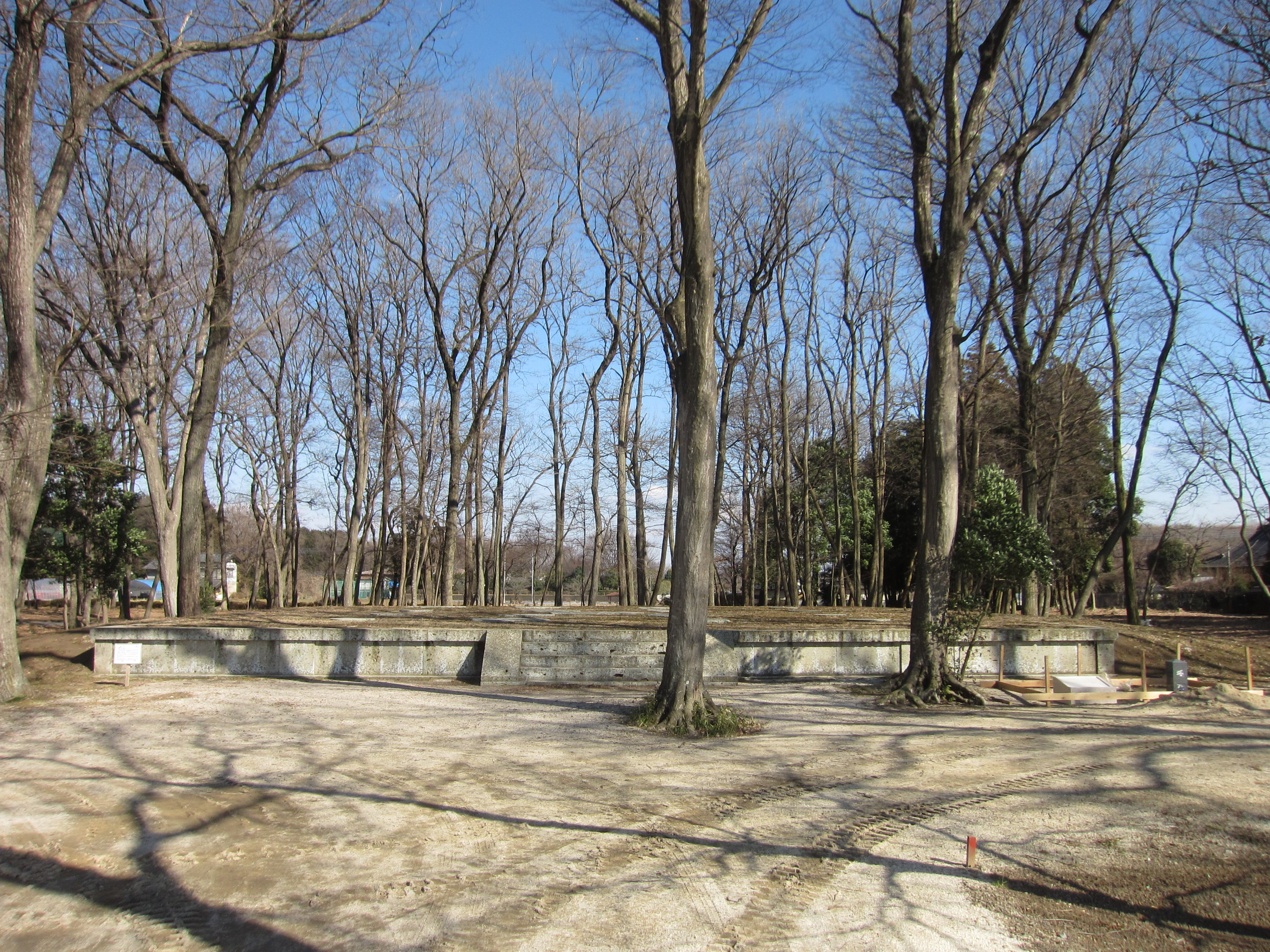
site of the Pagoda

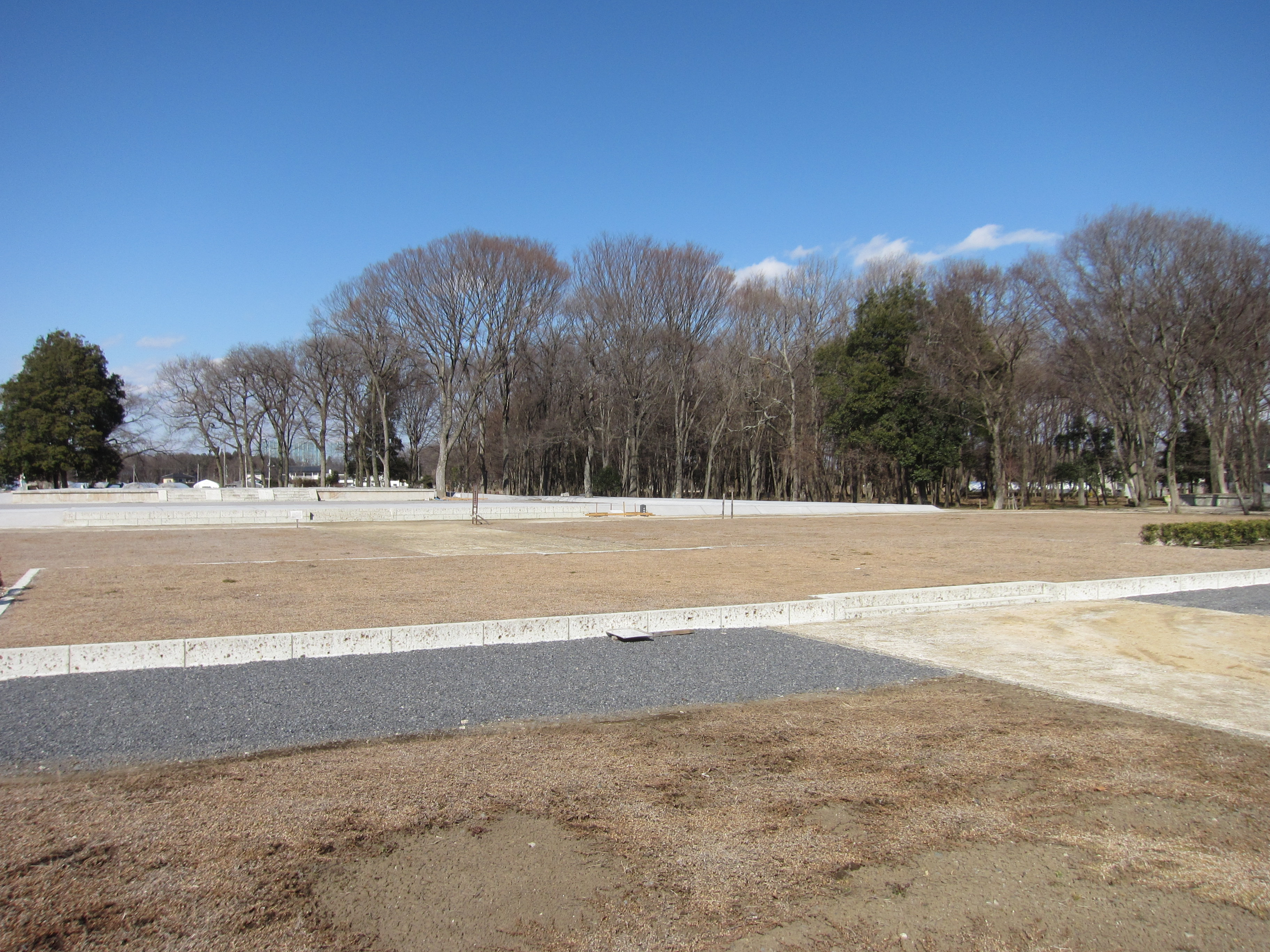
site of the South Gate

== Shimotsuke Kokubun-niji ==
The ruins of the national nunnery associated with the Shimotsuke Kokubun-ji, the Shimotsuke Kokubun-niji (下野国分尼寺) are located 600 meters to the east of the Shimotsuke Kokubun-ji ruins. The temple occupied a trapezoidal layout, with an east-west dimension of 270 meters, and a north-south dimension of 145 meters on its long sides, and 211 meters and 52 meters on its short side. The layout of the temple was almost identical to that of the Shimotsuke Kokubun-ji, but on a correspondingly smaller scale and without a pagoda. An excavation survey was carried out in 1964, and this was the first example of a comprehensive survey of the remains of a provincial nunnery in Japan. This led to its designation as a National Historic Site in 1965. The nunnery fell into ruin in the Heian period and was never rebuilt.

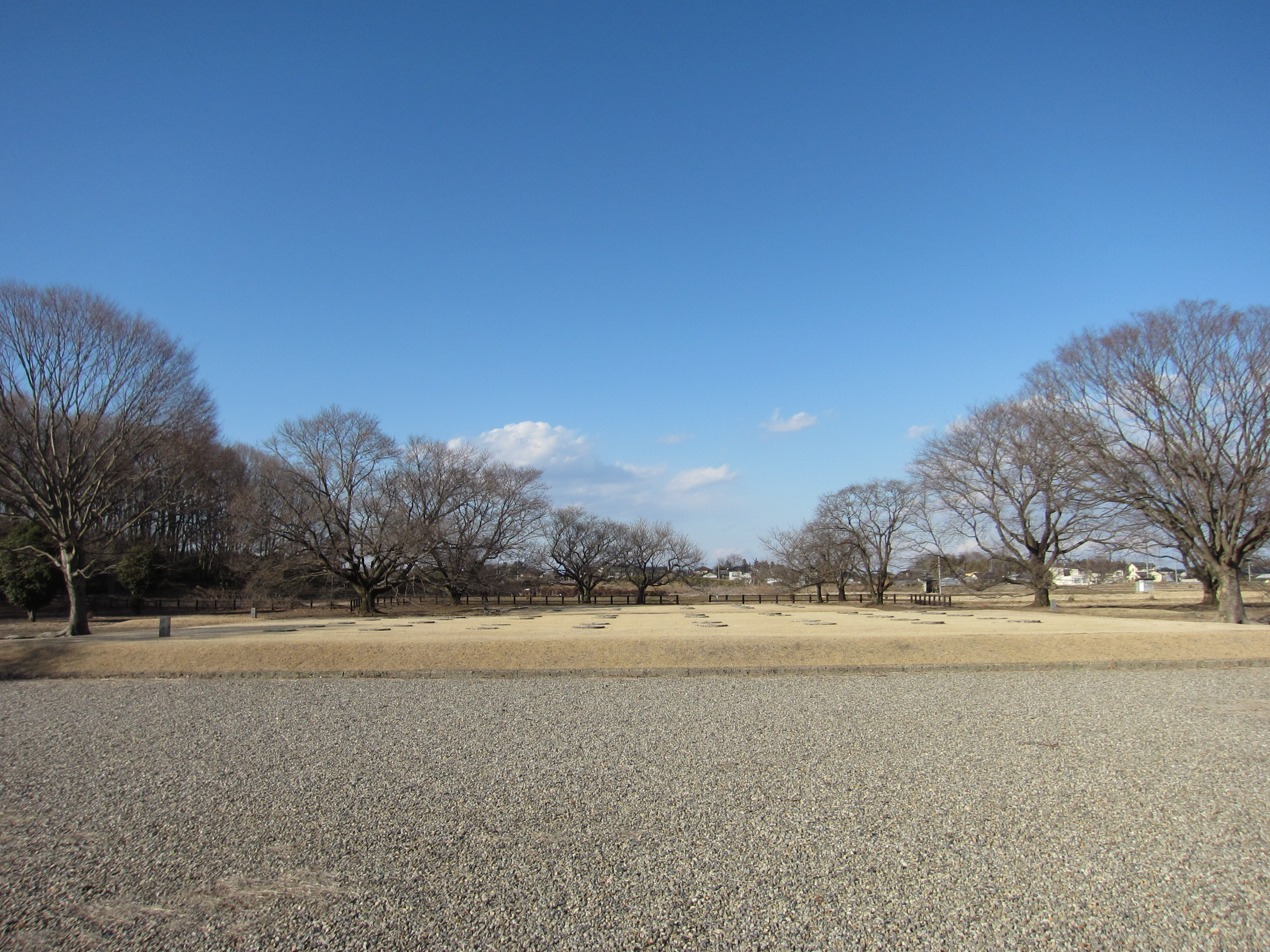
site of the Kondō

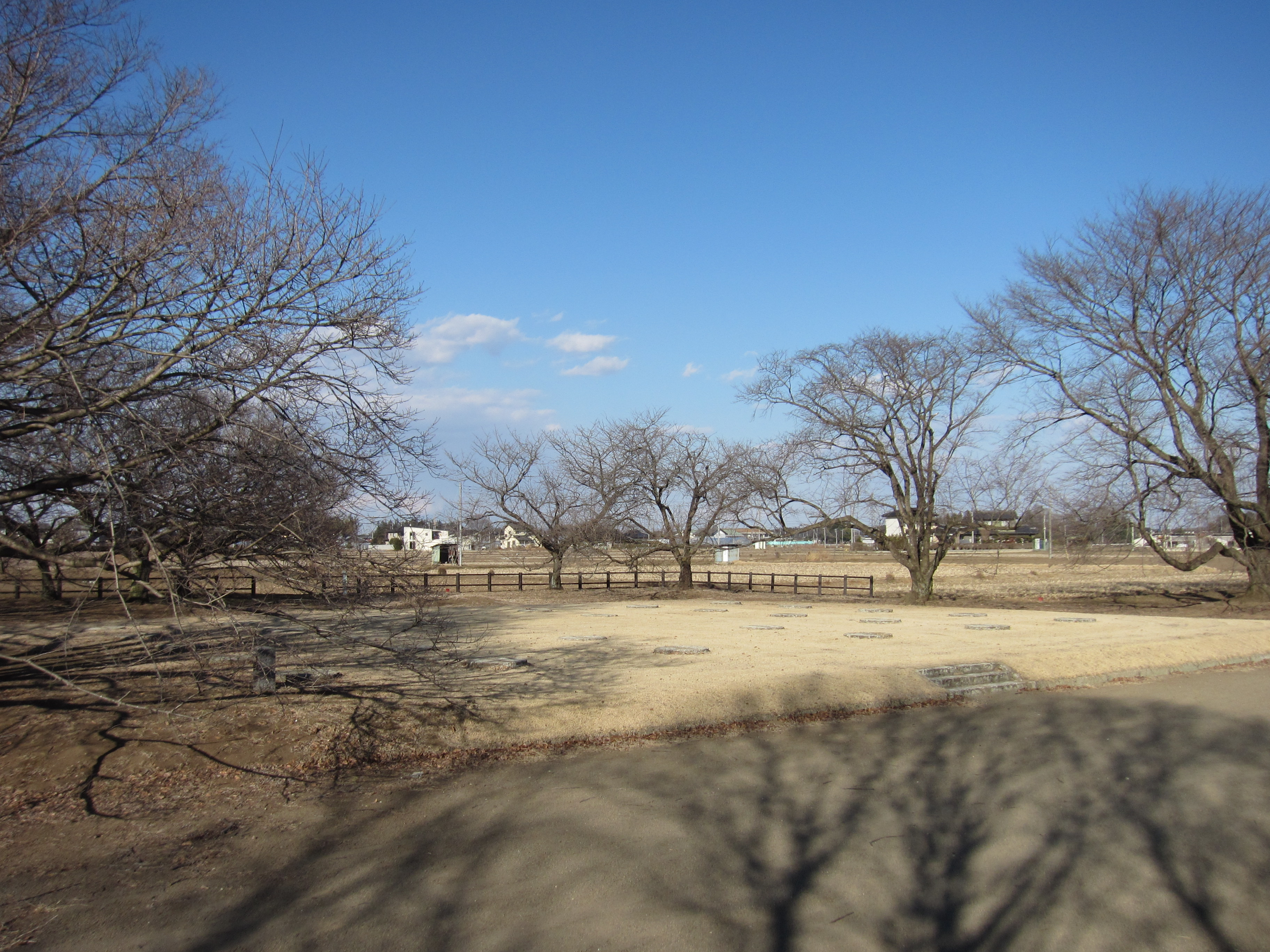
site of the Lecture Hall

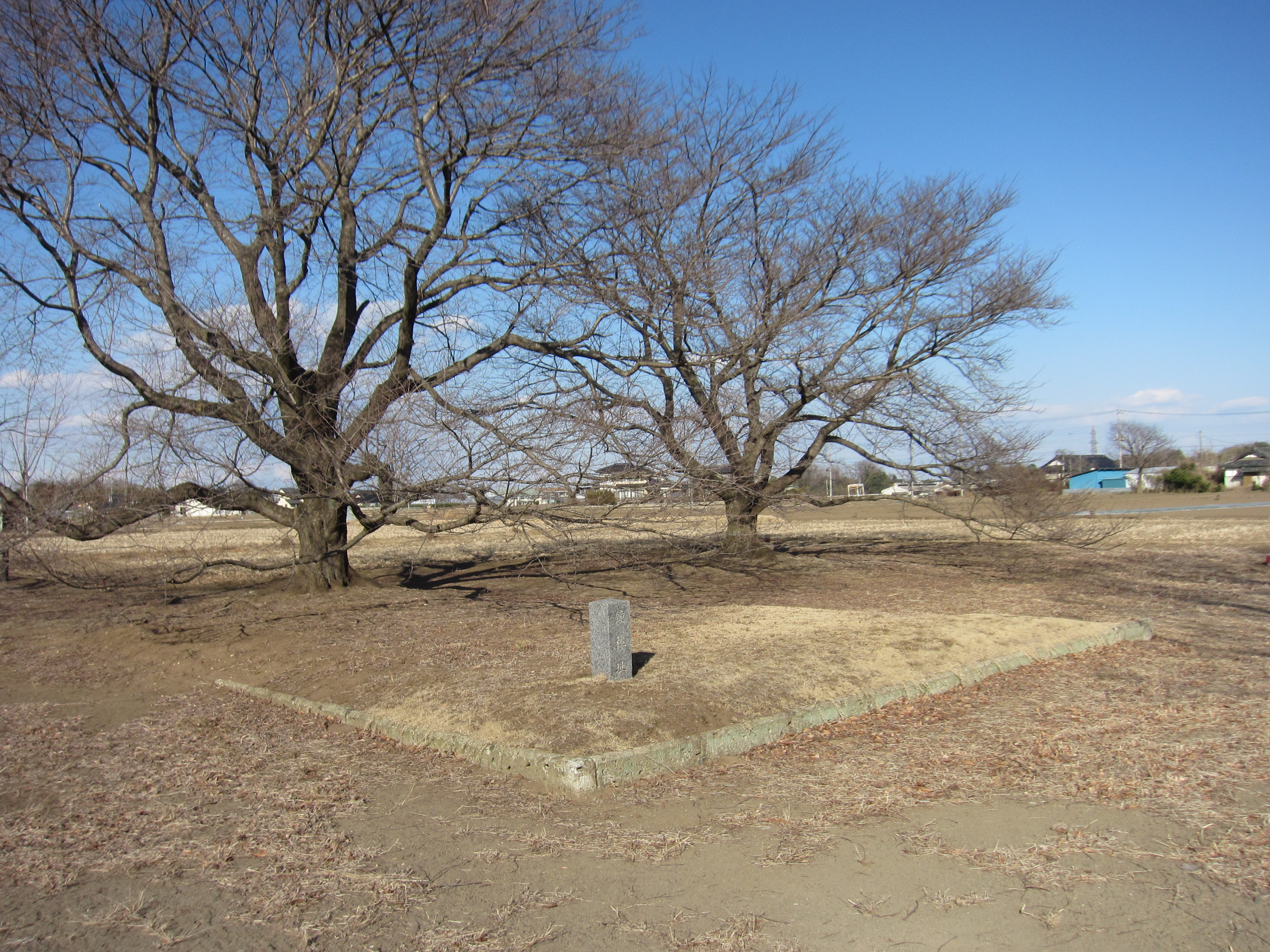
site of the Belfry

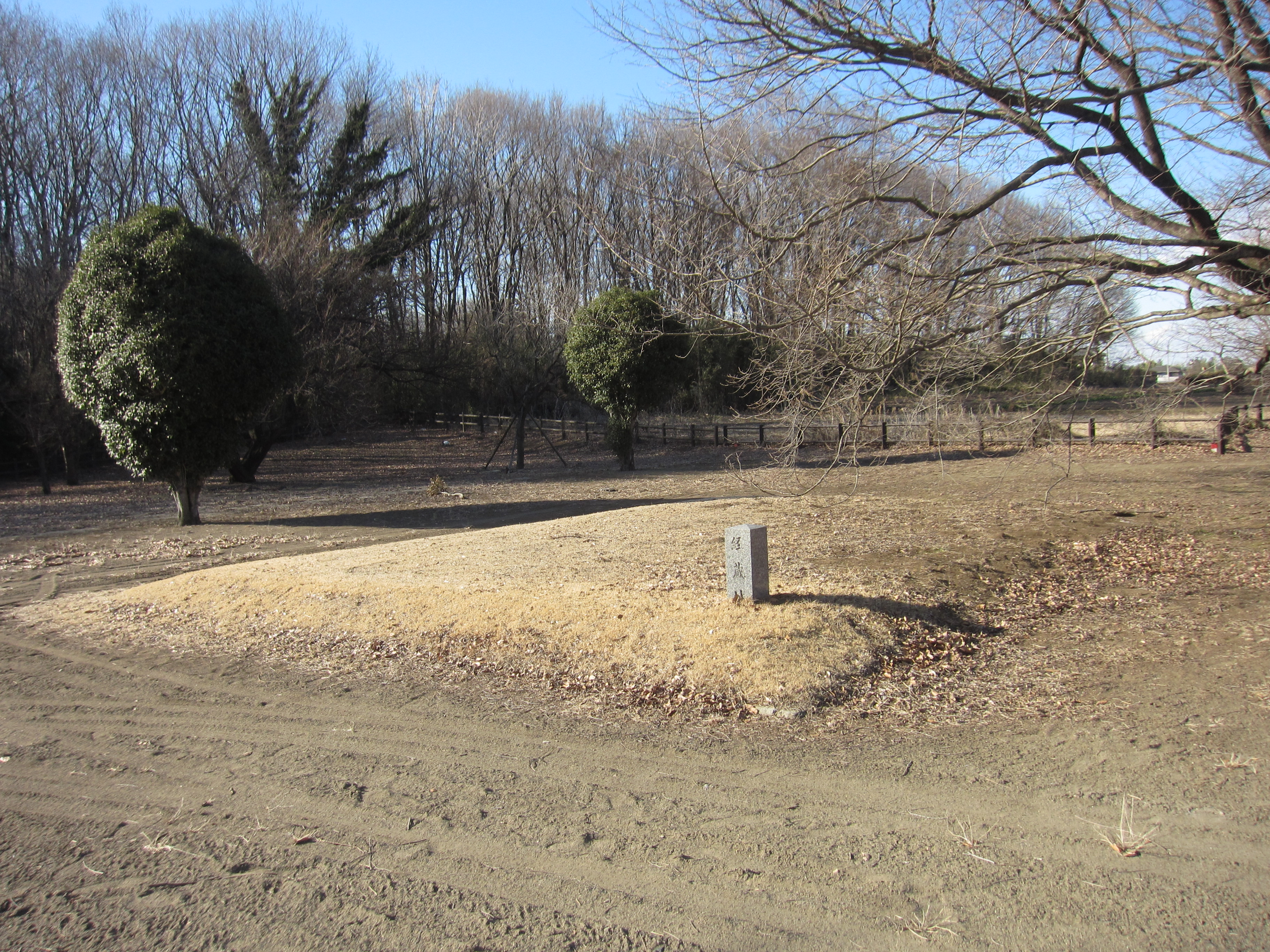
site of the Kyōzō

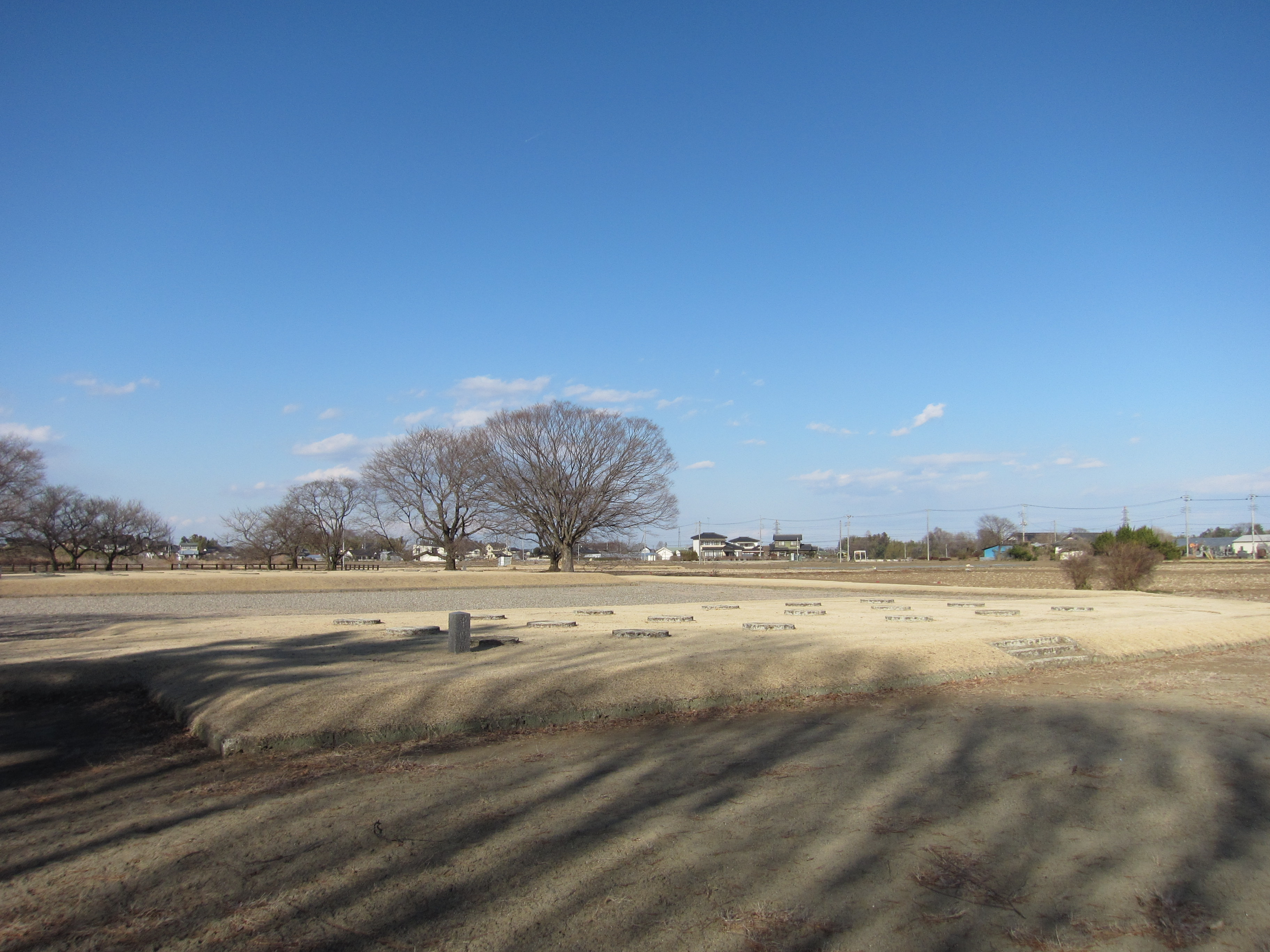
Site of the Middle Gate

== See also ==
- Provincial temple
- List of Historic Sites of Japan (Tochigi)
