= Atagozuka Kofun (Shimotsuke) =

Kofun period burial mound in Tochigi, Japan

- 愛宕塚古墳 (Japanese)
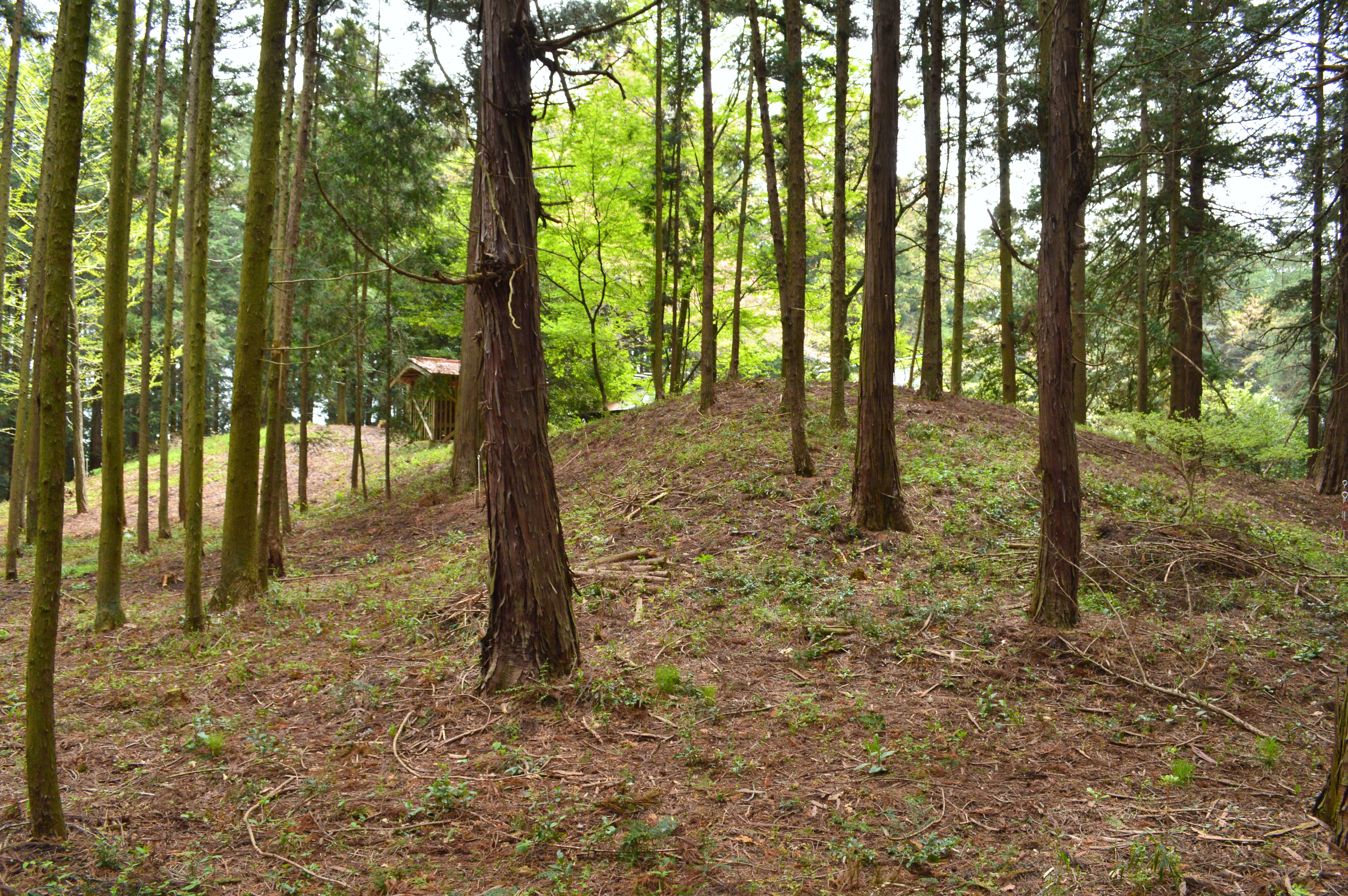
- Atagozuka Kofun

- Atagozuka Kofun Atagozuka Kofun (Shimotsuke) (Japan)
- 36°23′33.06″N 139°48′23.26″E
- Type: Kofun
- Periods: Kofun period
- Location: Kokubunji-cho, Shimotsuke, Tochigi
- Region: Kantō region

History
- Built: late 6th century

Site notes
- Public access: Yes
- Tochigi Prefecture Historic Site

Shimotsuke Kofun cluster（Iizuka・Kokubunji areas）

The Atagozuka Kofun (愛宕塚古墳) is a Kofun period burial mound, located in the Kokubunji-cho neighborhood of the city of Shimotsuke, Tochigi in the Kantō region of Japan. The tumulus was designated a Tochigi Prefecture Historic Site in 1978. It is also referred to as the Kokubunji Atagozuka Kofun or the Atago Jinja Kofun after its location or the Atago shrine located at the constricted part of the tumulus.

== Overview ==
The Atagozuka Kofun was constructed on a plateau between the Sugata River and the Omoi River in the western part of Shimotsuke City, in southern Tochigi Prefecture. Nearby, are the Sannozuka Kofun and Maruzuka Kofun, forming the Kokubun Kofun cluster; however, the plateau area is also known for the distribution of large burial mounds, including the Marishitenzuka Kofun, Biwazuka Kofun, and Azuma Kofun. The tumulus is a zenpō-kōen-fun (前方後円墳), which is shaped like a keyhole, having one square end and one circular end, when viewed from above. It has a length of 78.5 meters and height of five meters and is orientated to the southwest. The tumulus is constructed in two stages, with the first stage being a flat, platform-like structure, exhibiting the characteristics of the "Shimotsuke-type tumulus" unique to the Shimotsuke region. No haniwa clay figures have been found on the surface of the tumulus, and it is presumed that none existed. A well-preserved moat and earthen embankment (circular levee) surround the mound in an eyebrow shape, and the total length of the tumulus, including the moat, is 101 meters.

A Sue ware pottery stand and pot were unearthed during the reconstruction of the shrine in 1928. Surveys were conducted in 2012, but proper archaeological excavations has been conducted. The burial facility is presumed to be a horizontal-entry stone burial chamber in the posterior circular portion, but has not been found. The construction period is estimated to be the late 6th century, during the late Kofun period.

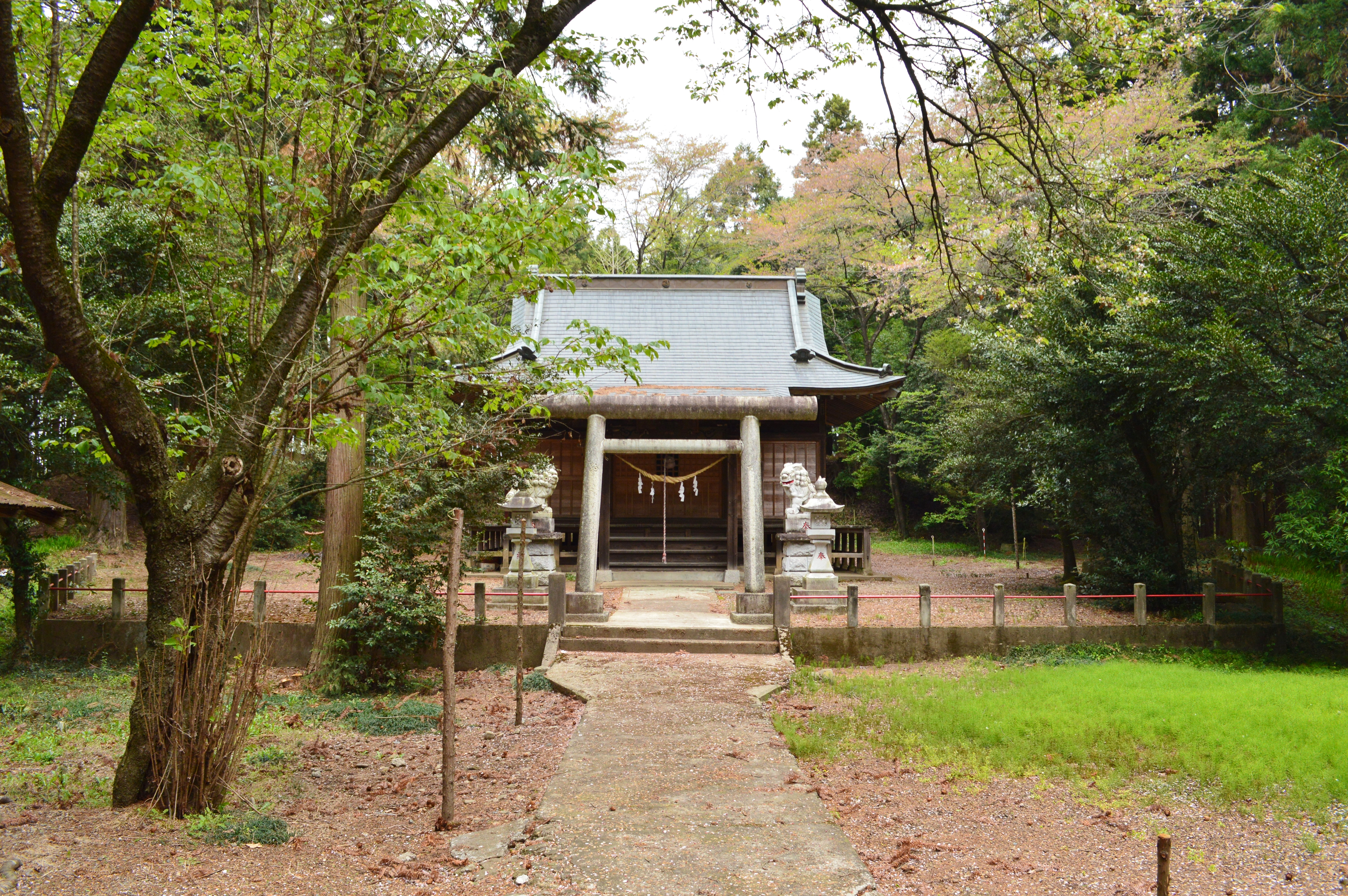
Atago shrine

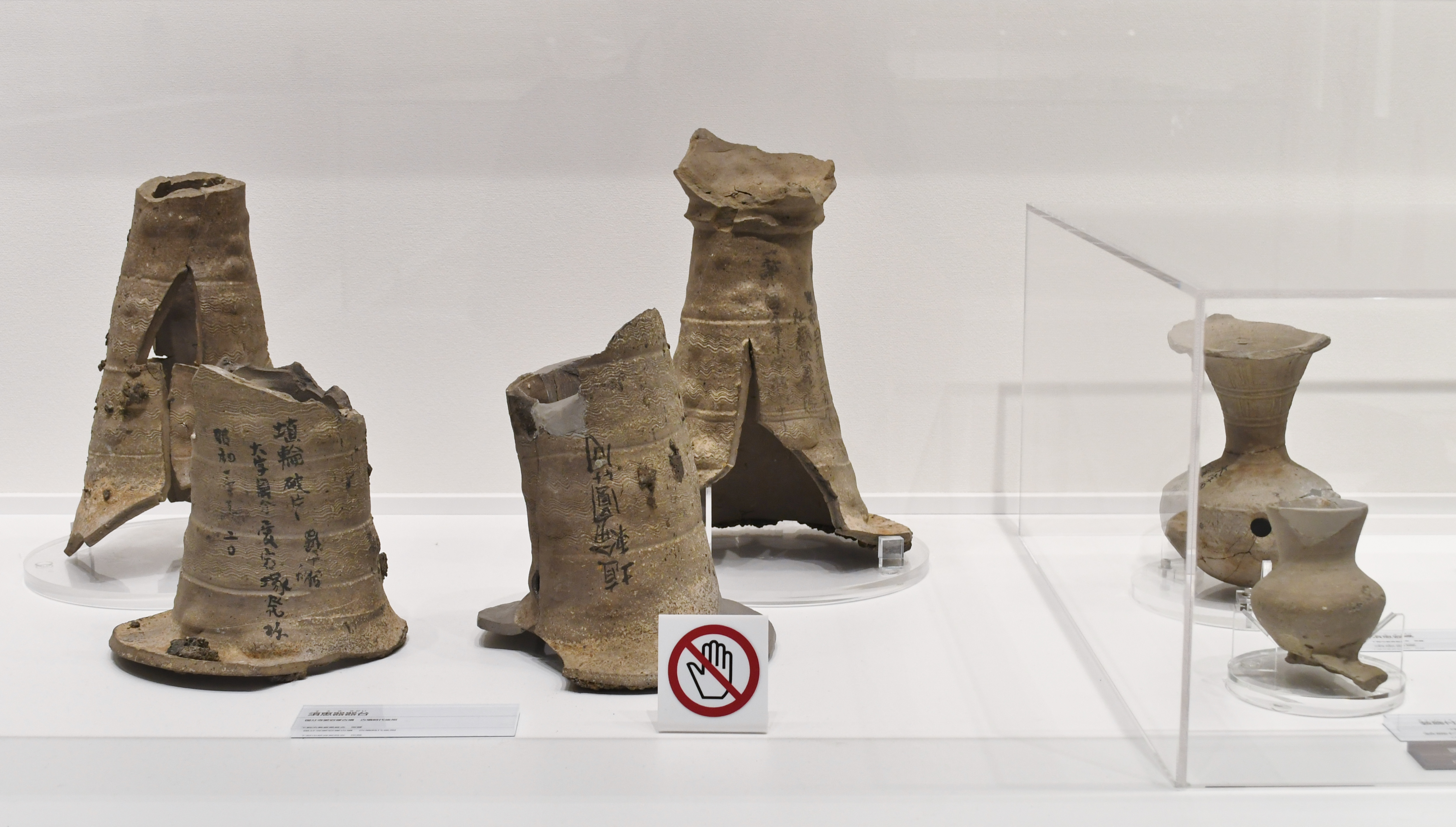
Artifacts from the Atagozuka Kofun

Shimotsuke Tumulus Group (Iizuka/Kokubunji Area)
Name	Type		Date	HS status
Marishitenzuka Kofun	zenpō-kōen-fun	Mound length 120m	Late 5th century	NHS
Biwazuka Kofun	zenpō-kōen-fun	Mound length 123m	Early 6th century	NHS
Azuma Kofun	zenpō-kōen-fun	Mound length 128m	Late 6th century	NHS
Kozuka Kofun	Scallop	Mound length 80m	Late 6th century	None
Atagozuka Kofun	zenpō-kōen-fun	Mound length 78.5m	Late 6th century	PHS
Sannozuka Kofun	zenpō-kōen-fun	Mound length 89m	Late 6th century - Early 7th century	None
Maruzuka Kofun	Circular	Diameter 65m	Early 7th century	PHS

The tumulus is approximately 4.5 kilometers from Koganei Station on the JR East Utsunomiya Line.

== See also ==
- List of Historic Sites of Japan (Tochigi)
