= Azuma Kofun =

- 吾妻古墳 (Japanese)
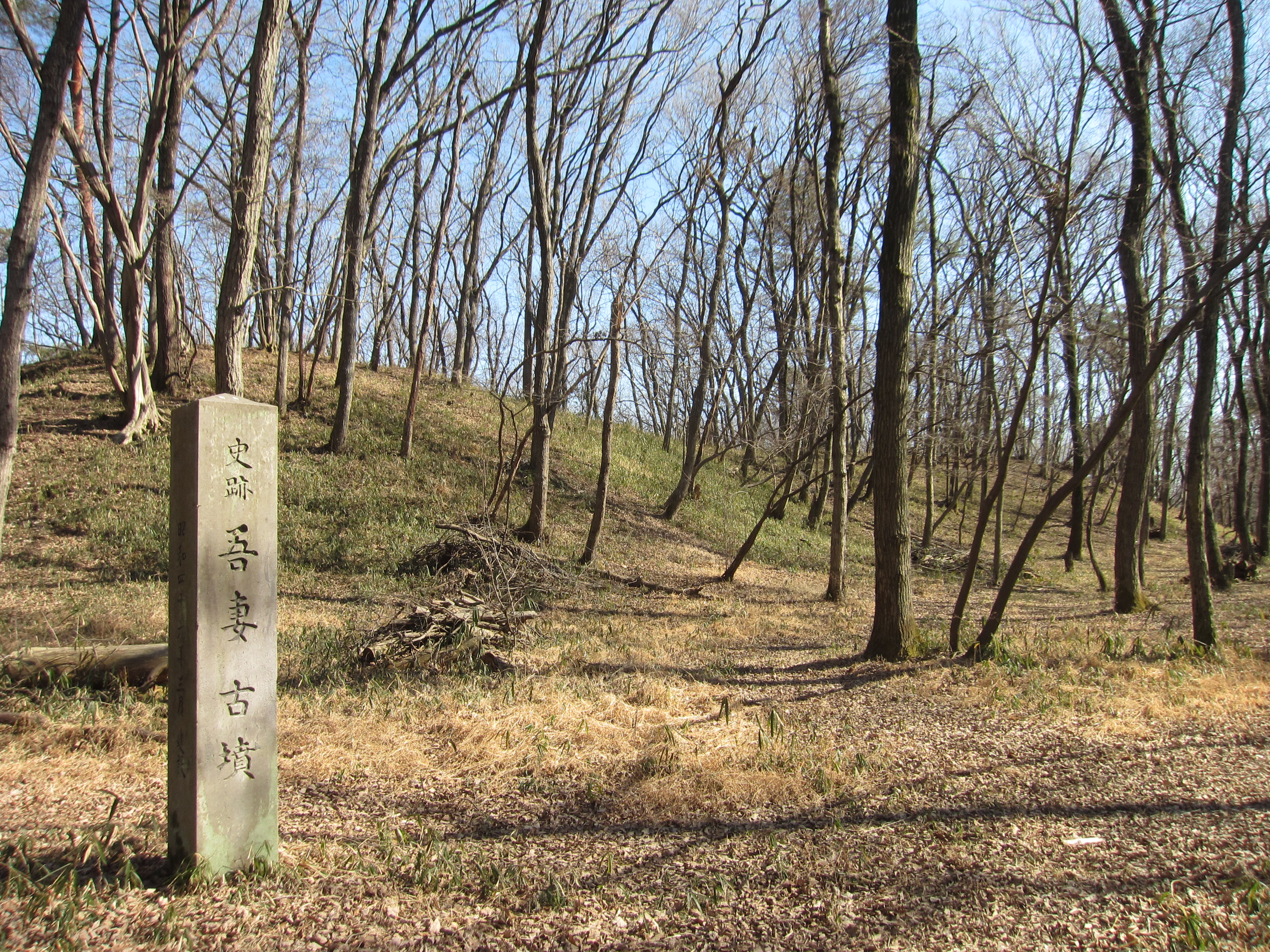
- Azuma Kofun

- Azuma Kofun Azuma Kofun (Japan)
- 36°24′15.16″N 139°48′41.13″E
- Type: kofun
- Periods: Kofun period
- Location: Mibu / Tochigi, Tochigi Prefecture, Japan
- Region: Kantō region

History
- Built: late 6th century AD

Site notes
- Public access: Yes

Shimotsuke Kofun cluster（Iizuka・Kokubunji areas）

The Azuma Kofun (吾妻古墳) is a Kofun period burial mound located on the border of the town of Mibu, Shimotsuga District, and the city of Tochigi in Tochigi Prefecture in the northern Kantō region of Japan. It received protection as a National Historic Site in 1970. The stones removed from this kofun to Mibu Castle (see below) are collectively designated a Tochigi Prefectural Tangible Cultural Property

== Overview ==
The Azuma Kofun is located on a narrow plateau between the Ogawa and Sugata rivers, which run north and south through the northern Kantō Plain. As a result of an archaeological excavation from 2007 to 2010, it was determined that the tumulus is a zenpō-kōhō-fun (前方後方墳) built in two tiers. The first stage (base) is a wide, platform-like structure, exhibiting the characteristics of the "Shimotsuke-type tumulus" unique to the Shimotsuke region. The total length of the tumulus is about 128 meters, and is the largest in the prefecture. The second tier is about 86 meters long with a height of about 10 meters. The two-tiered mound is set on a base of similar shape, and is surrounded by a moat with a width of about 20 meters and a depth of about three meters. Pumice deposits from the 1108 AD eruption of Mount Asama were confirmed from the soil filling the moat. The burial facility is a horizontal-entry stone burial chamber with dimensions of 2.4 meters long x 1.7 meters wide x 2.0 meters high; however, during the Edo period, the front part of the rectangular portion of the tumulus was destroyed, and the entrance stone and one of the ceiling stones were removed by the daimyō of Mibu Domain for use as ornamental stones in the gardens of Mibu Castle, where they can still be seen. The entrance stone was of cut tuff with a rectangular opening for a door, whereas the ceiling stone (and remaining stones in the walls and remaining ceiling of the burial chamber) are of monolithic diorite. Red pigment was applied to the walls of the burial chamber, which was backfilled for preservation after the 2010 archaeological excavation.

The surface of the tumulus is covered with fukiishi revetment stones. Fragments of cylindrical and house-shaped haniwa have been recovered. The tumulus is a representative example of a kofun of the late Kofun period, from around the latter half of the 6th century.

Recovered artifacts, including small objects of gold and copper found in the burial chamber, are on display at the Shimotsuke Fudoki-ga-oka Museum at site, which is located approximately eight minutes by car from Mibu Station on the Tōbu Railway Tōbu Utsunomiya Line.

== Gallery ==
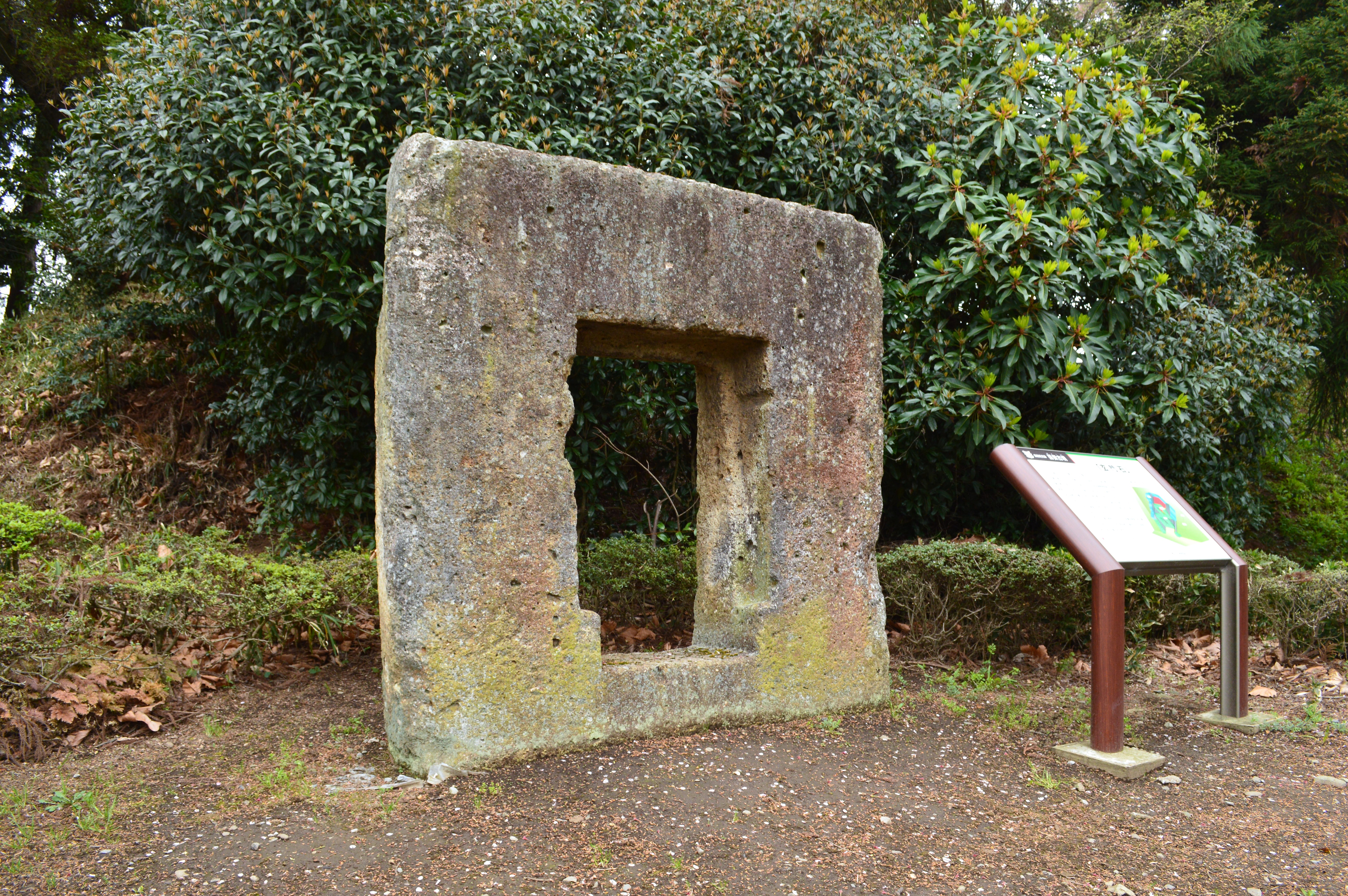
Entrance monolith to Azuma Kofun now relocated to Mibu Castle

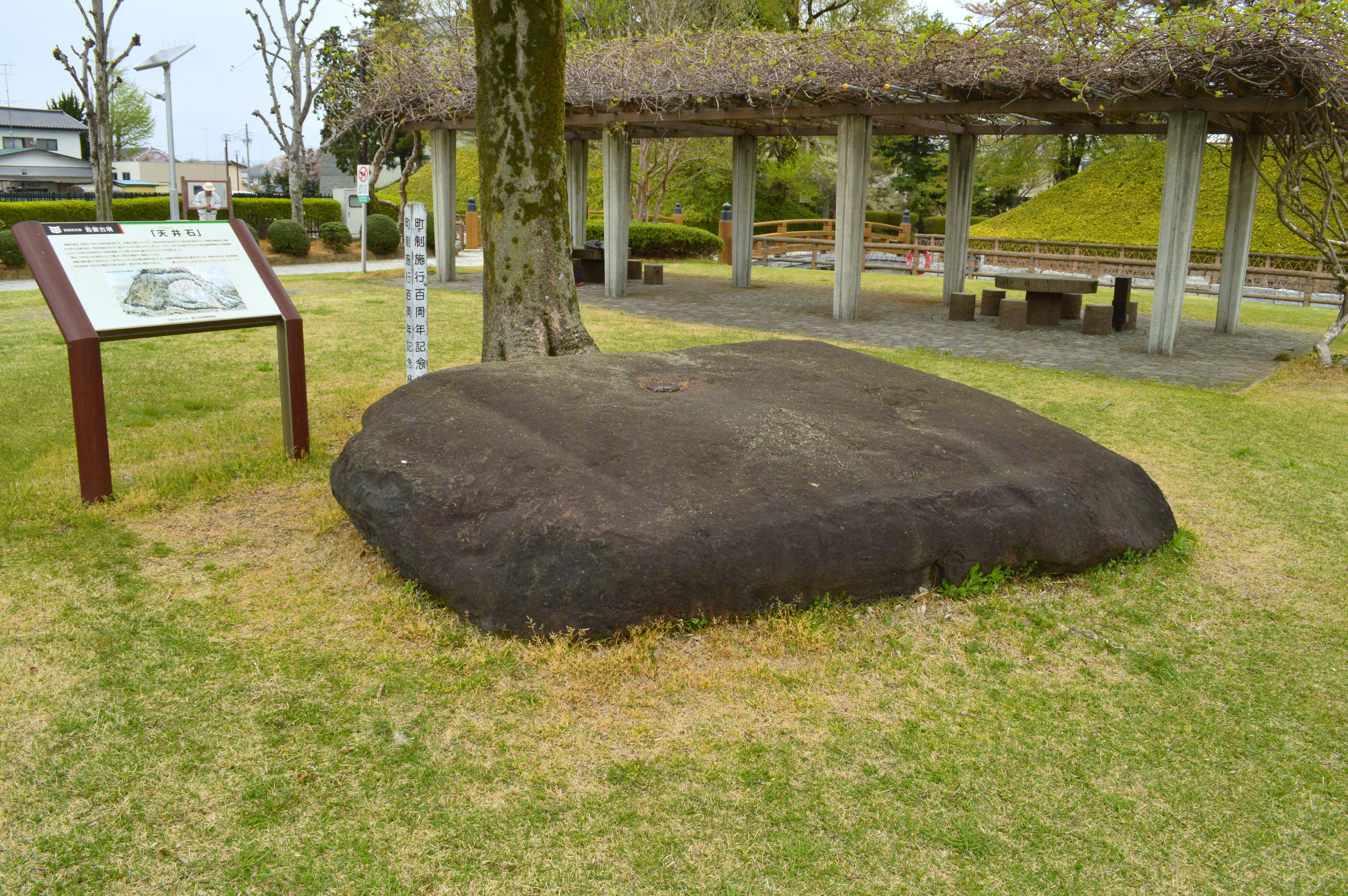
Ceiling monolith to Azuma Kofun now relocated to Mibu Castle

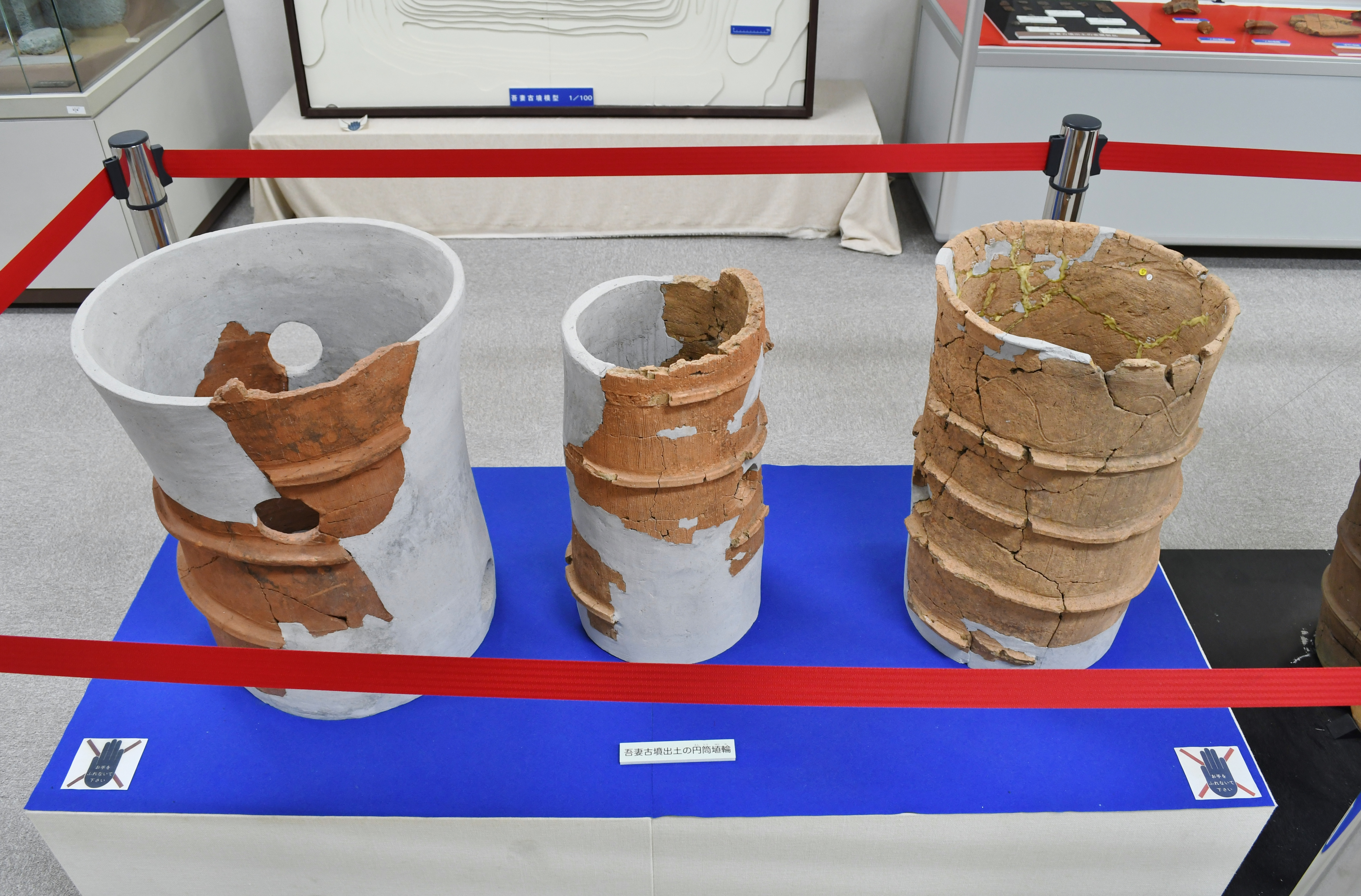
Haniwa

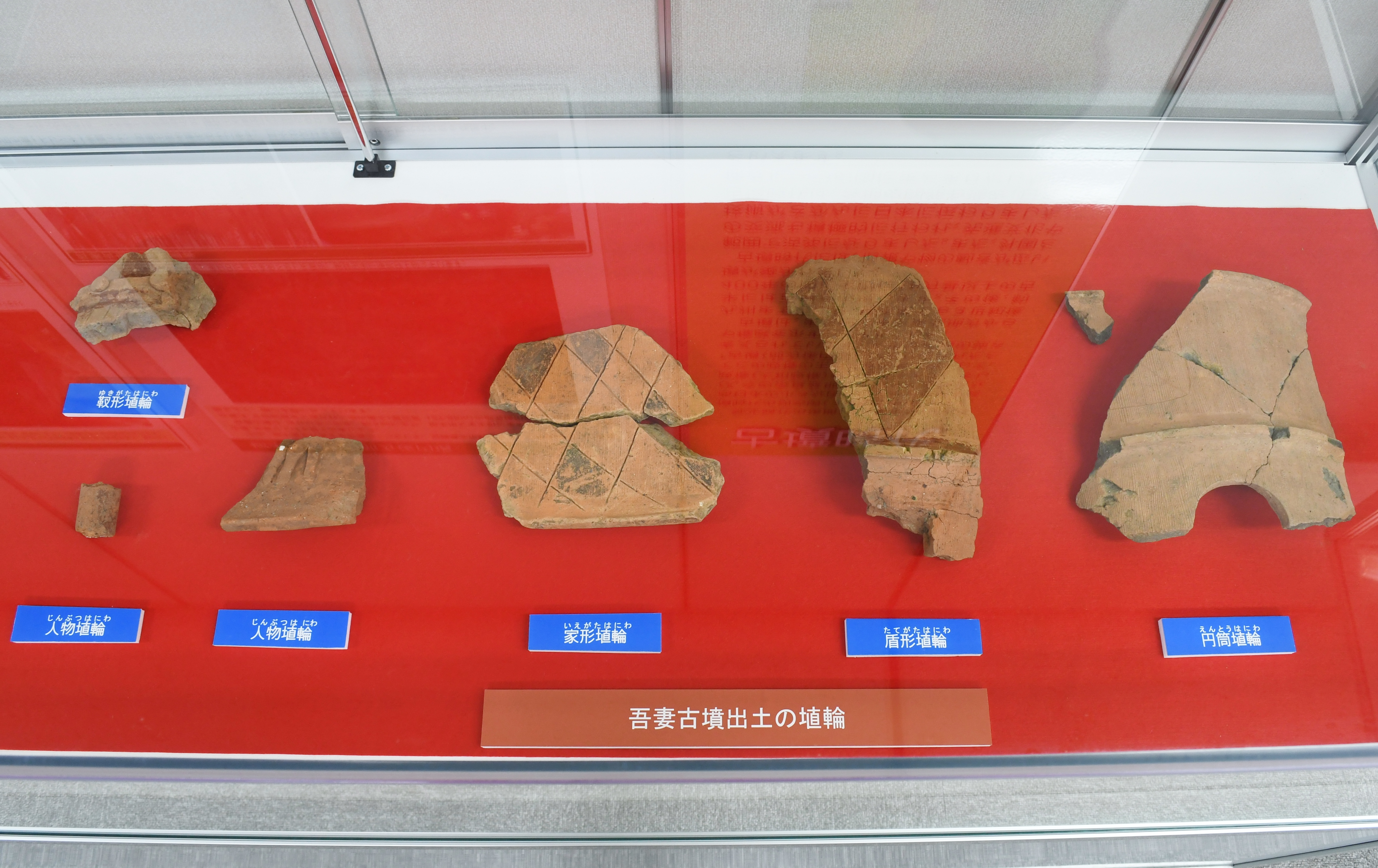
Haniwa fragments

Shimotsuke Tumulus Group (Iizuka/Kokubunji Area)
Name	Type		Date	HS status
Marishitenzuka Kofun	zenpō-kōen-fun	Mound length 120m	Late 5th century	NHS
Biwazuka Kofun	zenpō-kōen-fun	Mound length 123m	Early 6th century	NHS
Azuma Kofun	zenpō-kōen-fun	Mound length 128m	Late 6th century	NHS
Kozuka Kofun	Scallop	Mound length 80m	Late 6th century	None
Atagozuka Kofun	zenpō-kōen-fun	Mound length 78.5m	Late 6th century	PHS
Sannozuka Kofun	zenpō-kōen-fun	Mound length 89m	Late 6th century - Early 7th century	None
Maruzuka Kofun	Circular	Diameter 65m	Early 7th century	PHS

== See also ==
- List of Historic Sites of Japan (Tochigi)
