= Otomefudōhara Tile Kiln =

Archaeological site in Japan

Otomefudōhara Tile Kiln ruins
- 乙女不動原瓦窯跡 (Japanese)
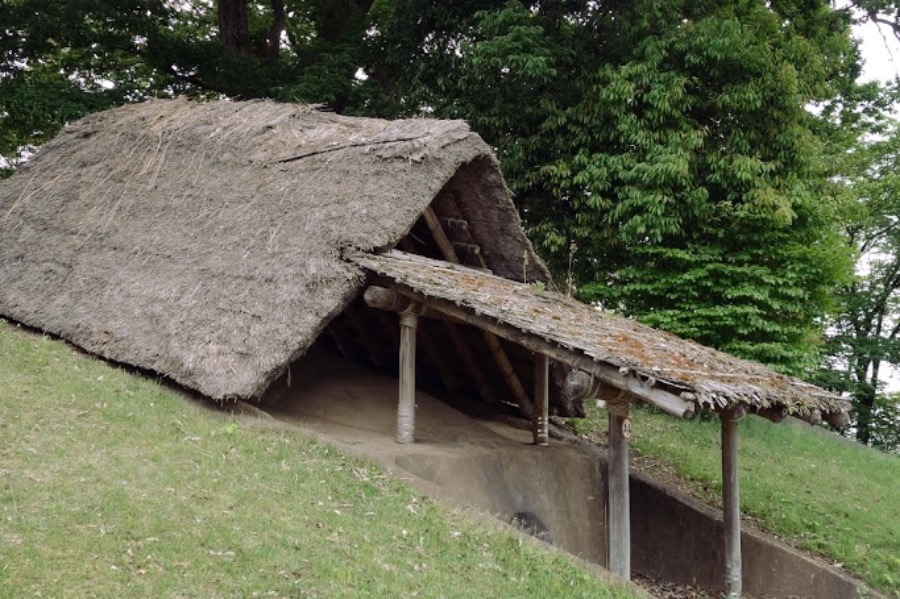
- Otomefudōhara Tile Kiln reconstruction

- Otomefudōhara Tile Kiln ruins Otomefudōhara Tile Kiln (Japan)
- 36°15′44″N 139°45′22″E
- Periods: early Nara period
- Location: Oyama, Tochigi, Japan
- Region: Kantō region

Site notes
- Public access: Yes (public park)

The Otomefudōhara Tile Kiln ruins (乙女不動原瓦窯跡, Otomefudōhara kawara gama ato) is an archaeological site with the ruins of an early Nara period kiln, located in the city of Oyama, Tochigi Prefecture in the northern Kantō region of Japan. It was designated a National Historic Site of Japan in 1978.

== Overview ==
Kawara (瓦) roof tiles made of fired clay were introduced to Japan from Baekche during the 6th century along with Buddhism. During the 570s under the reign of Emperor Bidatsu, the king of Baekche sent six people to Japan skilled in various aspects of Buddhism, including a temple architect. Initially, tiled roofs were a sign of great wealth and prestige, and used for temple and government buildings. The material had the advantages of great strength and durability, and could also be made at locations around the country wherever clay was available.

The Otomefudōhara site is located at the western end of a plateau that extends along the left bank of the Omoi River, a tributary of the Watarase River that flows through the west of Oyama city. The ruins of four tile kilns were confirmed by a survey in 1976 lined up on the northern slope of the plateau, along with a clay excavation pit and the foundations of workshops. All of the kilns are anagama-style kilns, and traces of ash spread 80 meters east-west and 30 meters north-south in the valley in front of the ruins. The site has been known for centuries as a location where roof tile shards could be found. The presence of kiln ruins was conformed in 1977 and an excavation survey was conducted over 5 years from 1988.

Excavations found 66 roof tiles in a number of styles, including a style similar to Hakuho period tiles, and tiles with arabesque decorations. These same types of tiles have been excavated from the nearby Shimotsuke Yakushi-ji temple ruins and the Shimotsuke Kokubun-ji ruins.

The unearthed artifacts are stored and displayed in the adjacent Oyama City Museum, and the site was opened to the public as the Otome Kawaranosato Park, the first historic park in Oyama, in 1998. The site is about a 7 minute walk from Mamada Station on the JR East Tohoku Main Line.

== See also ==
- List of Historic Sites of Japan (Tochigi)
