= Oyama, Tochigi =

Oyama 小山市
- City
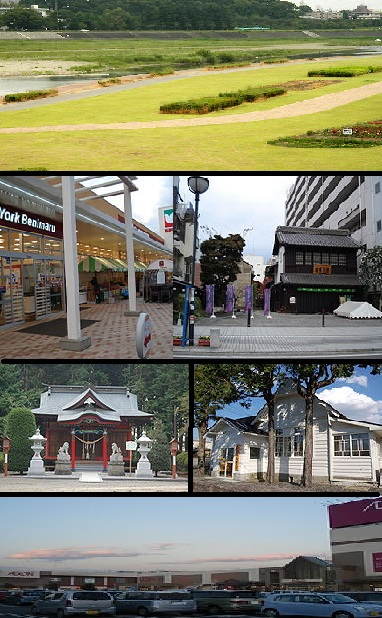
- upper:Omoigawa River, upper middle: Oyama Yuen, Oyamamachi Station lower middle: Shirahige Jinja, Oyama City Archives lower:Aeon Oyama shopping center

- Flag Seal

- Location of Oyama in Tochigi Prefecture

- Coordinates: 36°18′52.6″N 139°48′0.6″E
- Country: Japan
- Region: Kantō
- Prefecture: Tochigi
- First official recorded: 1st century BC (official)
- Town settled: April 1, 1889
- City settled: March 31, 1954

Government
  - Mayor: Masatomi Asano (since July 2020)

Area
  - Total: 171.76 km^{2} (66.32 sq mi)

Population (August 2020)
  - Total: 167,647
  - Density: 976.05/km^{2} (2,528.0/sq mi)
- Time zone: UTC+9 (Japan Standard Time)
- Phone number: 0285-23-1111
- Address: 1-1-1 Chūō-chō, Oyama-shi, Tochigi-ken 323-8686
- Climate: Cfa
- Website: Official website
- Symbols
- Bird: Japanese wagtail
- Flower: Omoigawazakura (Prunus × subhirtella)
- Tree: Quercus myrsinaefolia

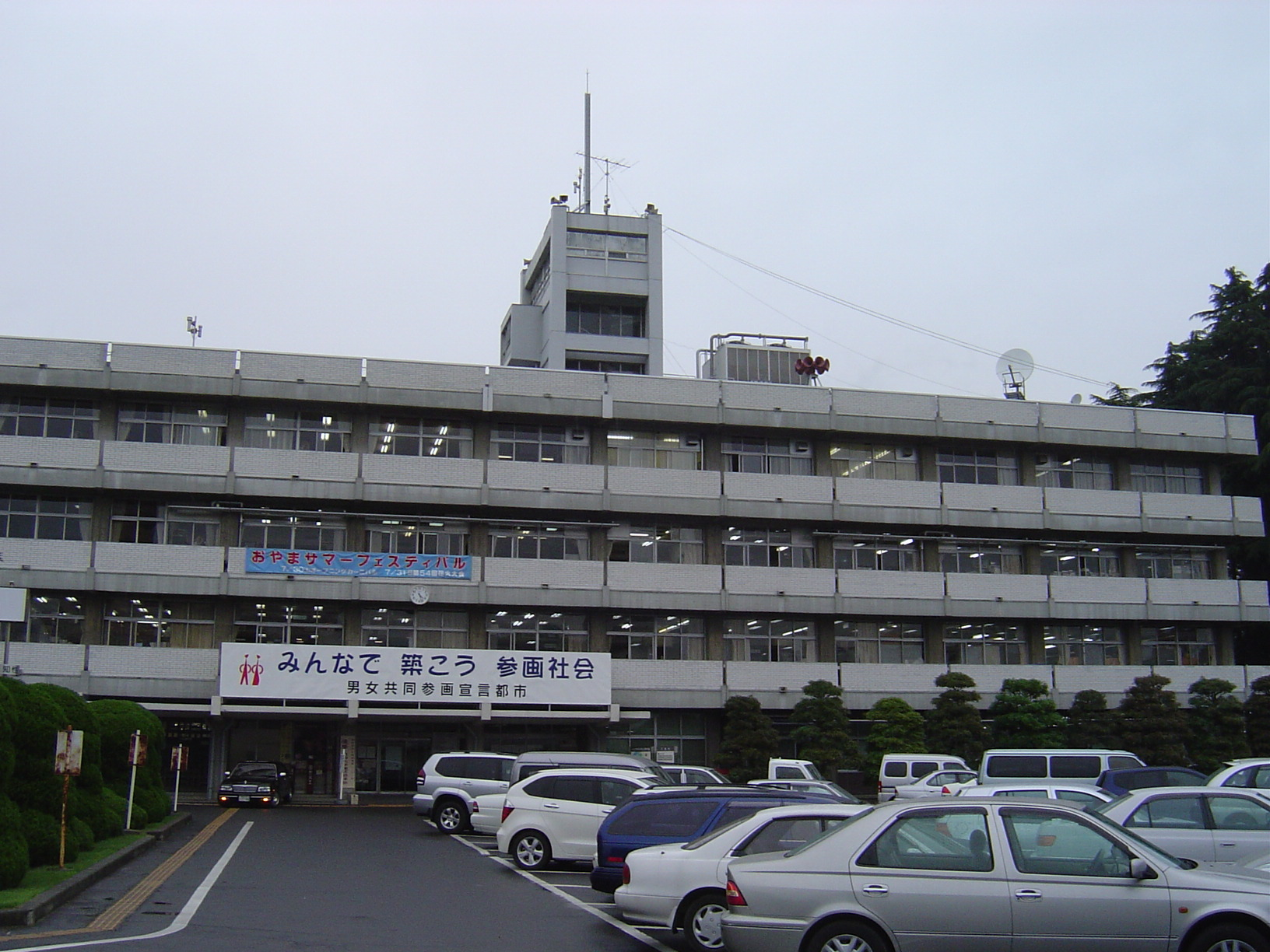
Oyama City Hall

Oyama (小山市, Oyama-shi; Japanese pronunciation: [ó̞.jä̀.mä̀, ò̞.jä́.mä́.ɕì]) is a city located in Tochigi Prefecture, Japan. As of 1 August 2020, the city had an estimated population of 167,647 in 70,928 households, and a population density of 980 persons per km^{2}. The total area of the city is 171.76 square kilometres (66.32 sq mi). In 2006, Oyama became the second most populous city in Tochigi Prefecture, with the capital Utsunomiya retaining the number one spot.

== Geography ==
Oyama is located in the far southeastern corner Tochigi Prefecture, bordered by Ibaraki Prefecture to the south and east. The terrain is almost flat, and the city is in the north-central part of the Kanto plain. The Omoigawa, a branch of the Watarase River flows through the center of the city. The Ubagawa River is on the western end of the city, Tagawa is on the eastern end of the city, and Kinugawa River is on the eastern end. Oyama is approximately 60 kilometers north of the Tokyo metropolis and approximately 30 kilometers south of the prefecture capital of Utsunomiya.

=== Surrounding municipalities ===
Ibaraki Prefecture

- Chikusei
- Koga
- Yūki

Tochigi Prefecture

- Mooka
- Nogi
- Shimotsuke
- Tochigi

=== Climate ===
Oyama has a humid subtropical climate (Köppen Cfa) characterized by warm summers and cold winters with heavy snowfall. The average annual temperature in Oyama is 14.5 °C (58.1 °F). The average annual rainfall is 1,275.7 mm (50.22 in) with September as the wettest month. The temperatures are highest on average in August, at around 26.3 °C (79.3 °F), and lowest in January, at around 2.9 °C (37.2 °F).

Climate data for Oyama (1991–2020 normals, extremes 1978–present)
| Month | Jan | Feb | Mar | Apr | May | Jun | Jul | Aug | Sep | Oct | Nov | Dec | Year |
|---|---|---|---|---|---|---|---|---|---|---|---|---|---|
| Record high °C (°F) | 18.6 (65.5) | 23.5 (74.3) | 26.6 (79.9) | 31.4 (88.5) | 34.9 (94.8) | 38.5 (101.3) | 38.9 (102.0) | 38.9 (102.0) | 36.9 (98.4) | 33.6 (92.5) | 24.9 (76.8) | 25.4 (77.7) | 38.9 (102.0) |
| Mean daily maximum °C (°F) | 9.3 (48.7) | 10.3 (50.5) | 13.9 (57.0) | 19.4 (66.9) | 23.7 (74.7) | 26.3 (79.3) | 30.2 (86.4) | 31.5 (88.7) | 27.5 (81.5) | 21.8 (71.2) | 16.4 (61.5) | 11.5 (52.7) | 20.2 (68.3) |
| Daily mean °C (°F) | 2.9 (37.2) | 4.0 (39.2) | 7.7 (45.9) | 13.1 (55.6) | 18.0 (64.4) | 21.5 (70.7) | 25.2 (77.4) | 26.3 (79.3) | 22.6 (72.7) | 16.8 (62.2) | 10.5 (50.9) | 5.1 (41.2) | 14.5 (58.1) |
| Mean daily minimum °C (°F) | −2.8 (27.0) | −1.8 (28.8) | 1.8 (35.2) | 7.2 (45.0) | 12.9 (55.2) | 17.5 (63.5) | 21.5 (70.7) | 22.5 (72.5) | 18.8 (65.8) | 12.5 (54.5) | 5.4 (41.7) | −0.4 (31.3) | 9.6 (49.3) |
| Record low °C (°F) | −10.8 (12.6) | −9.7 (14.5) | −6.9 (19.6) | −3.2 (26.2) | 0.5 (32.9) | 9.0 (48.2) | 13.1 (55.6) | 13.9 (57.0) | 7.1 (44.8) | 0.1 (32.2) | −4.4 (24.1) | −8.3 (17.1) | −10.8 (12.6) |
| Average precipitation mm (inches) | 36.2 (1.43) | 38.8 (1.53) | 80.4 (3.17) | 102.2 (4.02) | 130.6 (5.14) | 135.1 (5.32) | 170.3 (6.70) | 138.4 (5.45) | 180.5 (7.11) | 161.7 (6.37) | 61.9 (2.44) | 39.7 (1.56) | 1,275.7 (50.22) |
| Average precipitation days (≥ 1.0 mm) | 4.1 | 5.0 | 8.7 | 9.9 | 10.9 | 12.5 | 13.4 | 9.8 | 11.3 | 10.4 | 6.3 | 4.5 | 106.8 |
| Mean monthly sunshine hours | 206.6 | 190.7 | 196.1 | 186.3 | 181.1 | 126.8 | 138.1 | 162.8 | 127.3 | 140.6 | 160.3 | 191.2 | 2,004.3 |
Source: Japan Meteorological Agency

=== Demographics ===
Per Japanese census data, the population of Oyama has grown steadily over the past 100 years.

Historical population
| Year | Pop. | ±% |
|---|---|---|
| 1920 | 52,163 | — |
| 1930 | 57,959 | +11.1% |
| 1940 | 60,551 | +4.5% |
| 1950 | 82,880 | +36.9% |
| 1960 | 83,455 | +0.7% |
| 1970 | 105,346 | +26.2% |
| 1980 | 127,226 | +20.8% |
| 1990 | 142,263 | +11.8% |
| 2000 | 155,198 | +9.1% |
| 2010 | 164,437 | +6.0% |
| 2020 | 166,666 | +1.4% |

== History ==
Oyama-shuku was a post station on the Nikkō Kaidō connecting Edo with the shrines at Nikkō, and was controlled by Utsunomiya Domain during the Edo period. Oyama town was established within Shimotsuga District, Tochigi with the establishment of the modern municipalities system on April 1, 1889. Oyama merged with the neighboring village of Otani on March 31, 1954 and was elevated to city status. On April 18, 1963, Oyama annexed the town of Mamada and village of Mita, both from Shimotsuga District. This was followed by the town of Kuwakinu on September 30, 1965.

== Government ==
Oyama has a mayor-council form of government with a directly elected mayor and a unicameral city legislature of 40 members. Oyama, together with the town of Nogi collectively contributes five members to the Tochigi Prefectural Assembly. In terms of national politics, the town is part of Tochigi 4th district of the lower house of the Diet of Japan.

== Economy ==
Oyama is a regional commercial center with a mixed economy. In agriculture, cultivation of rice, kanpyō and sericulture are important. The yuru-chara for Oyama is Kapyomaru (かぴょ丸, an anthropomorphized calabash of the type used for kanpyō. One of the major employers in the city is Komatsu making iron castings, diesel engines, fork lift trucks and other hydraulic equipment.

== Education ==
- Hakuoh University

=== Primary and secondary schools ===
Oyama has 25 public primary schools and ten public middle schools operated by the city government. The city has four public high schools operated by the Tochigi Prefectural Board of Education. There is also one private school. The prefectural also operates one special education school for the handicapped. The city also has a North Korean school, Tochigi Korean Elementary and Junior High School (栃木朝鮮初中級学校).

== Transportation ==
=== Railway ===
JR East – Tōhoku Shinkansen

- Oyama

JR East –Tōhoku Main Line (Utsunomiya Line)

- Mamada – Oyama

JR East – Ryōmō Line

- Oyama – Omoigawa

JR East – Mito Line

- Oyama

=== Highway ===
- National Route 4
- National Route 50

== Local attractions ==
- Biwazuka Kofun, National Historic Site
- Deranohigashi ruins, National Historic Site
- Marishitenzuka Kofun, National Historic Site
- Otomefudōhara Tile Kiln ruins, National Historic Site
- Washi Castle, Gion Castle and Nakakuki Castle ruins, collectively a National Historic Site

== International relations ==
- Mission City, British Columbia, Canada, sister city since October 7, 1996
- Cairns, Australia, sister city since March 15, 2006
- Lübz, Germany, since January 2, 2003
- Shaoxing, Zhejiang, China, friendship city since October 22, 2010
- Benxi, Liaoning, China, friendship city since October 26, 2014

== Notable people from Oyama ==
- Masashi Ebinuma, Olympic judoka
- Kosuke Hagino, Olympic gold medallist swimmer
- Yasushi Iihara, professional baseball player
- Hiromichi Kataura, scientist
- Hiroaki Takaya, professional baseball player
