= Yasushi Iihara =

Japanese baseball player

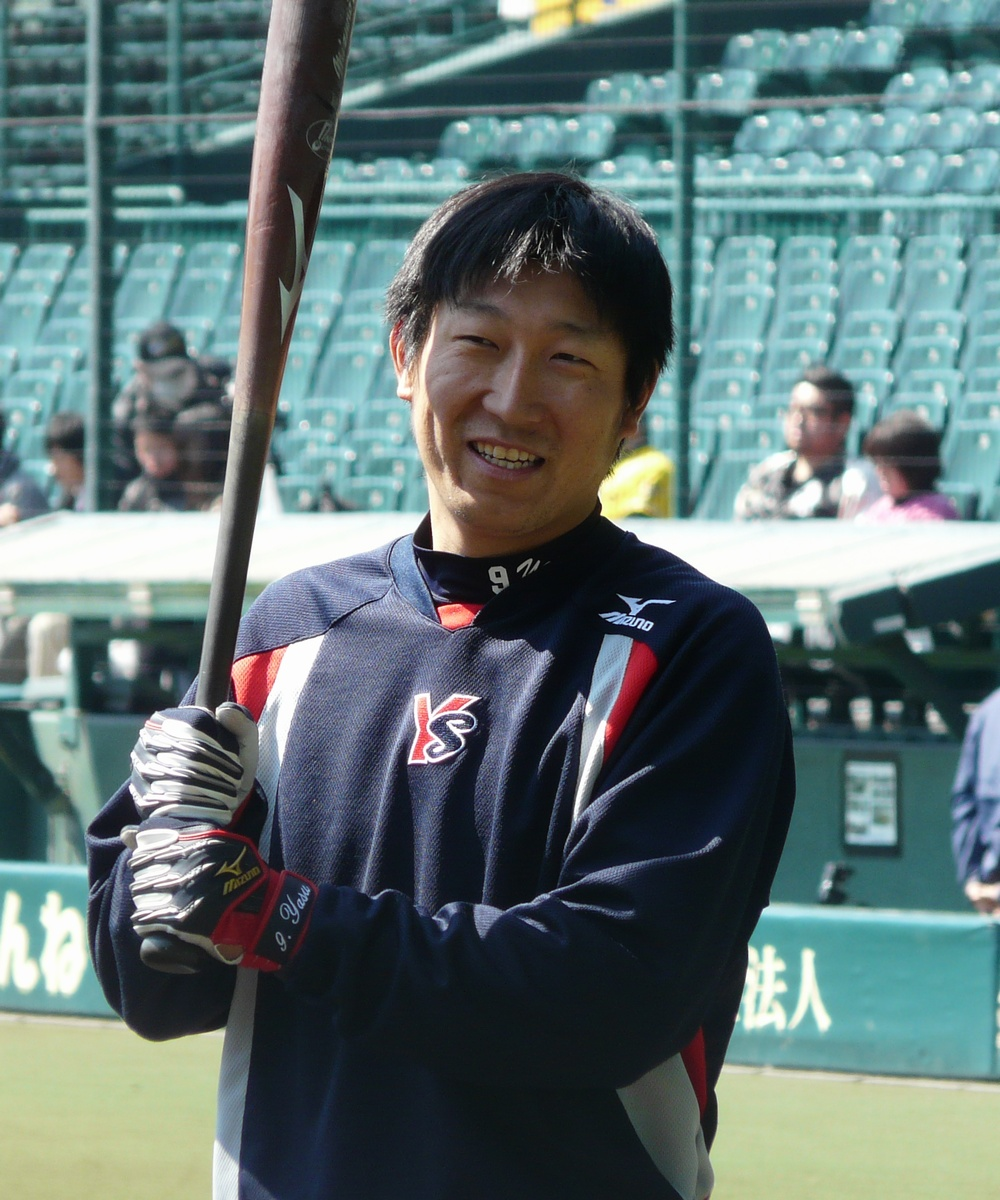

Tochigi Golden Braves – No. 9
- Outfielder/Coach
- Born: April 26, 1983 (age 42); Oyama, Tochigi, Japan
- Bats: Right Throws: Right

debut
- March 31, 2006, for the Tokyo Yakult Swallows

NPB statistics (through 2017)
- Batting average: .258
- Hits: 563
- Home runs: 49
- RBI: 246
- Stolen bases: 76
- Stats at Baseball Reference

Teams
- As player: Tokyo Yakult Swallows (2006–2017); Tochigi Golden Braves (2018–present); As coach: Tochigi Golden Braves (2018–present)

Yasushi Iihara (飯原 誉士, Iihara Yasushi; born April 26, 1983 in Oyama, Tochigi, Japan) is a professional Japanese baseball player. He plays outfielder for the Tochigi Golden Braves of Baseball Challenge League.

== Career ==
=== Tokyo Yakult Swallows ===
On December 2, 2017, he became a free agent.

=== Tochigi Golden Braves ===
On January 9, 2018, he signed with Tochigi Golden Braves of Baseball Challenge League.
