= Biwazuka Kofun =

- 琵琶塚古墳 (Japanese)
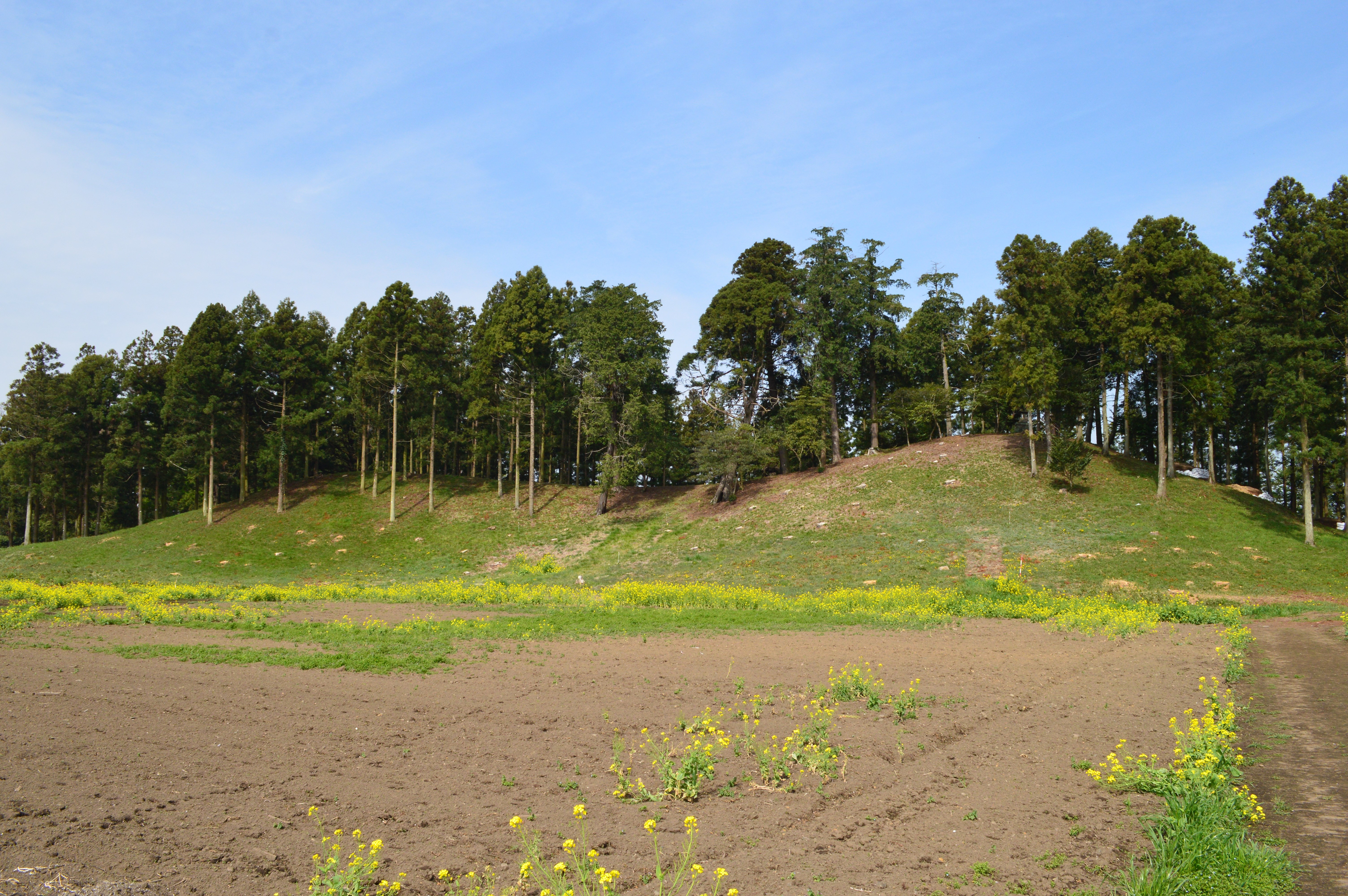
- Biwazuka Kofun

- Biwazuka Kofun Biwazuka Kofun (Japan)
- 36°22′30.88″N 139°48′25.67″E
- Type: kofun
- Periods: Kofun period
- Location: Oyama, Tochigi, Japan
- Region: Kantō region

History
- Built: late 6th century AD

Site notes
- Public access: Yes

The Biwazuka Kofun (琵琶塚古墳) is a Kofun period burial mound located in Iizuka neighborhood of the city of Oyama in Tochigi Prefecture in the northern Kantō region of Japan. The tumulus received protection as a National Historic Site in 1926. It is the second largest in the prefecture.

== Overview ==
The Biwazuka Kofun is a zenpō-kōen-fun (前方後円墳), which is shaped like a keyhole, having one square end and one circular end, when viewed from above. It is located on a narrow plateau between the Oshi and Sugata rivers, which run north and south through the northern Kantō Plain. This area was the central region of ancient Shimotsuke province, and contains many kofun and the ruins of the provincial capital and provincial temple (kokubunji). The Marishitenzuka Kofun is located 100 meters north of the Marishitenzuka Kofun, which is of almost identical size and orientation to the south-southwest.

The Biwazuka Kofun uses a natural hill as its base. As a result of an excavation in 1977, it was confirmed to have a total length of about 123 meters, making it the second largest in the prefecture. The tumulus is built in three tiers. The tumulus is surrounded by a moat, ranging from 18 to 20 meters in width. From fragments of cylindrical haniwa found in the moat in 2013, along with the shape of the mound, it is estimated that this kofun dates from the first half of the 6th century AD. The National Historic Site designation was expanded in 1981 to encompass the moat area.

Overall length
123 meters
Posterior circular portion
75 meter diameter x 11 meter high, 3-tier
Anterior rectangular portion
70 meters wide x 9 meters high, 3-tier

Recovered artifacts are on display at the Marishitenzuka-Biwazuka Kofun Museum in Oyama. The site is located approximately 15 minutes by car from Oyama Station on the Tohoku Shinkansen.

== Gallery ==
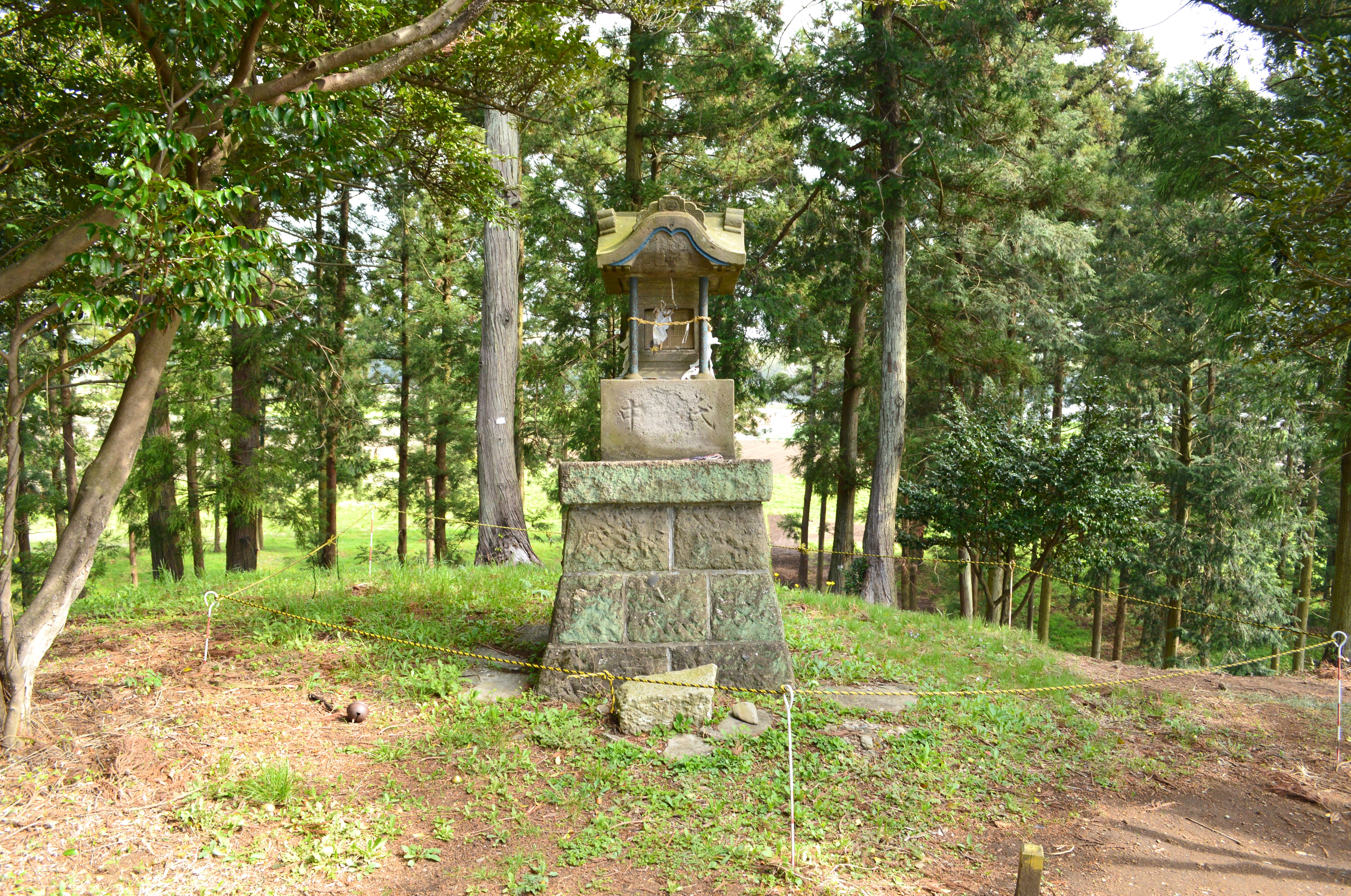
Shinto shrine on summit of the posterior portion

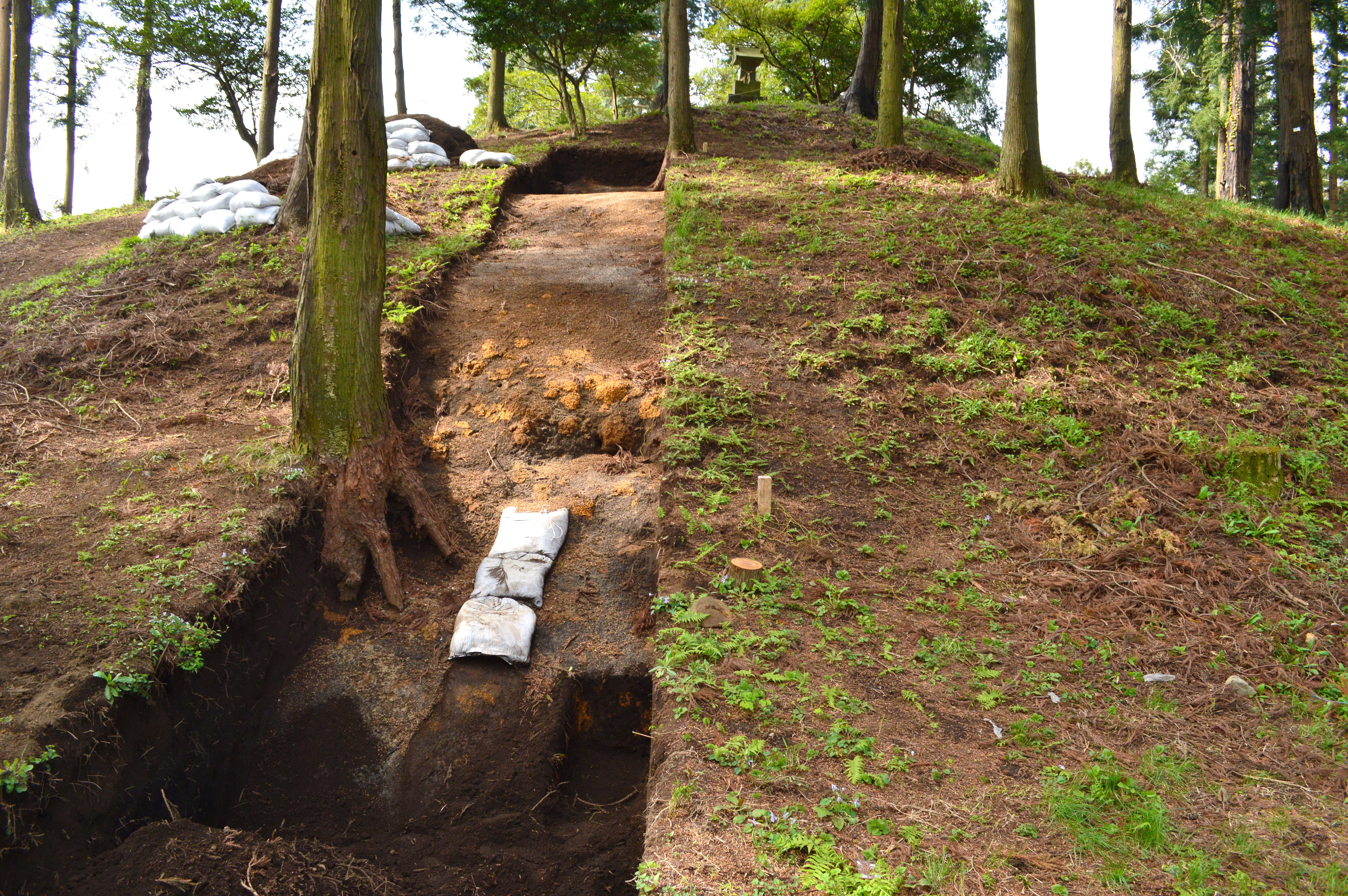
trench from the 2015 excavation

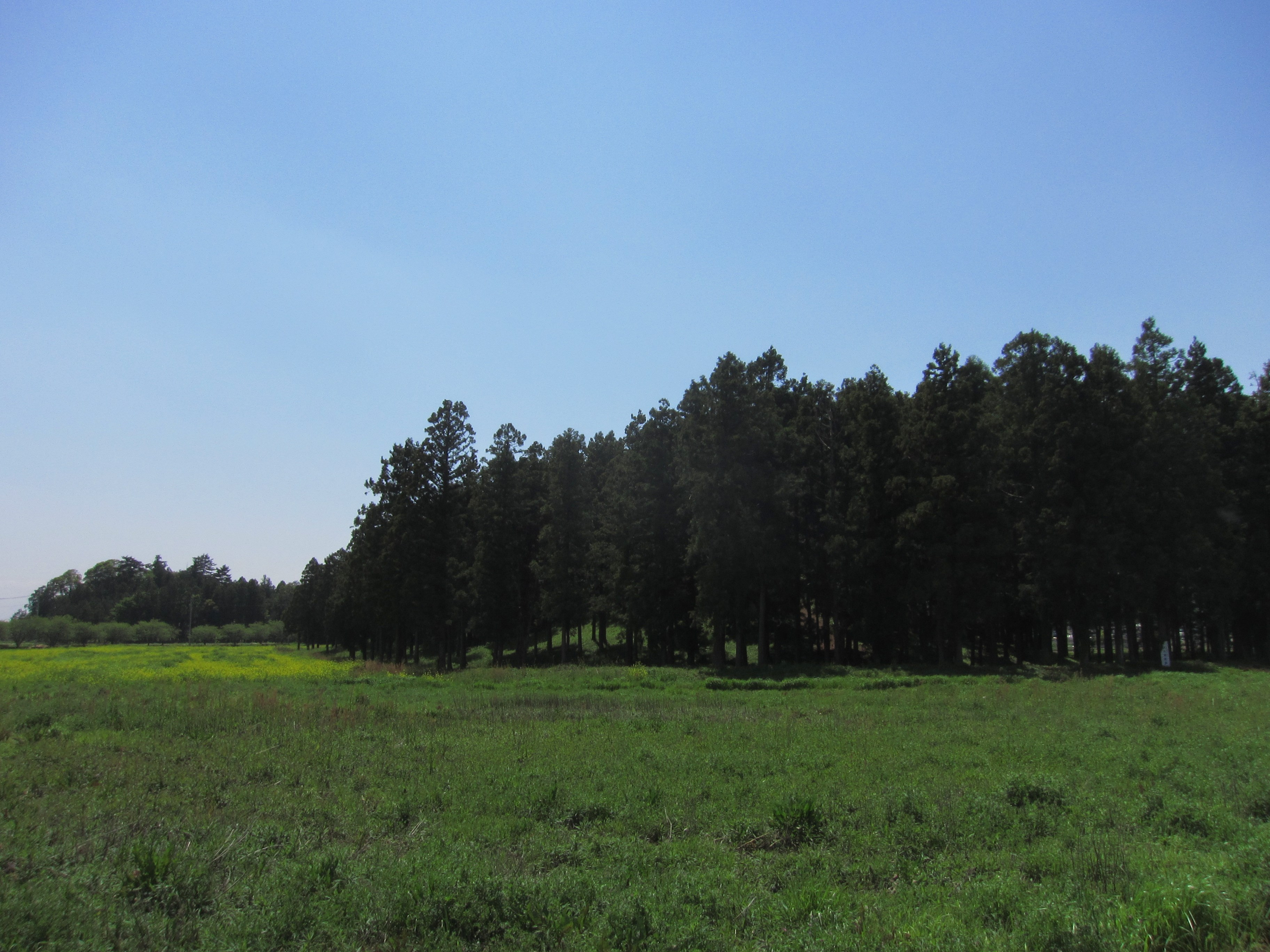
Biwazuka Kofun and Marishitenzuka Kofun

== See also ==
- List of Historic Sites of Japan (Tochigi)
