= Marishitenzuka Kofun =

- 摩利支天塚古墳 (Japanese)
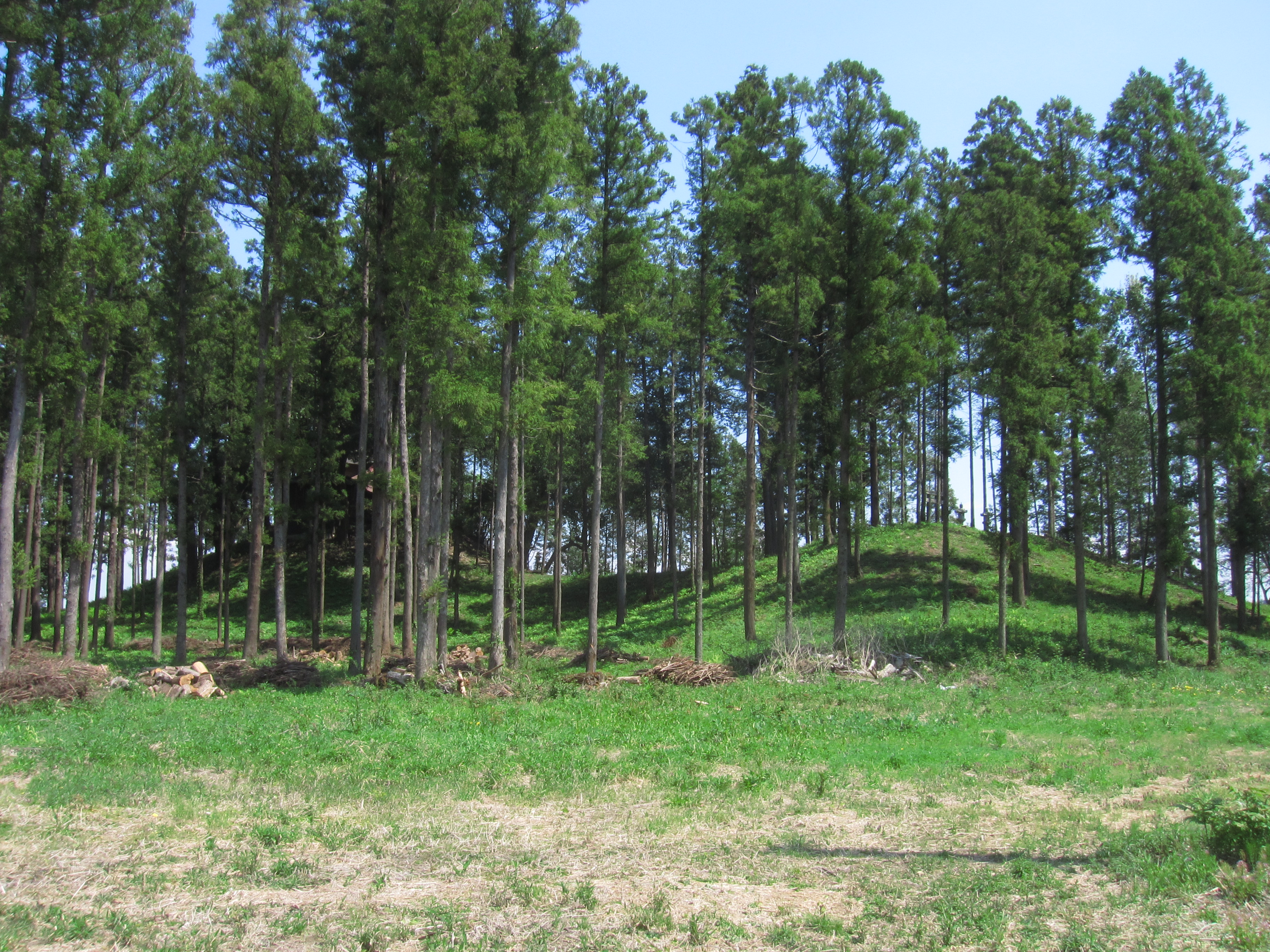
- Marishitenzuka Kofun

- Marishitenzuka Kofun Marishitenzuka Kofun (Japan)
- 36°22′20.39″N 139°48′21.31″E
- Type: kofun
- Periods: Kofun period
- Location: Oyama, Tochigi, Japan
- Region: Kantō region

History
- Built: late 5th century AD

Site notes
- Public access: Yes

The Marishitenzuka Kofun (摩利支天塚古墳) is a Kofun period burial mound located in the Iizuka neighborhood of the city of Oyama in Tochigi Prefecture in the northern Kantō region of Japan. It received protection as a National Historic Site in 1978. It is the third largest in the prefecture.

== Overview ==
The Marishitenzuka Kofun is a zenpō-kōen-fun (前方後円墳), which is shaped like a keyhole, having one square end and one circular end, when viewed from above. It is located on a narrow plateau between the Oshi and Sugata rivers, which run north and south through the northern Kantō Plain. This area was the central region of ancient Shimotsuke Province, and contains many kofun and the ruins of the provincial capital and provincial temple (kokubunji). The Marishitenzuka Kofun is located 100 meters south of the Biwazuka Kofun, which is of almost identical size and orientation to the south-southwest.

A small chapel to Marishi-ten is located on its summit, giving the tumulus its name. The tumulus was built by partially using a natural hill, and was constructed in two tiers. Fragments of cylindrical haniwa have been recovered. The construction date is said to be the end of the 5th century AD based on the shape of the tumulus and the excavated haniwa. The tumulus is surrounded by a moat with a width of 20 meters, which is double in places. The National Historic Site designation was expanded in 2002 to cover the remnants of the moats.

Overall length
120 meters
Posterior circular portion
70 meter diameter x 10 meter high, 2-tier
Anterior rectangular portion
70 meters wide x 6 meters high, 2-tier

Recovered artifacts are on display at the Marishitenzuka-Biwazuka Kofun Museum in Oyama. The site is located approximately 15 minutes by car from Oyama Station on the Tōhoku Shinkansen.

== Gallery ==
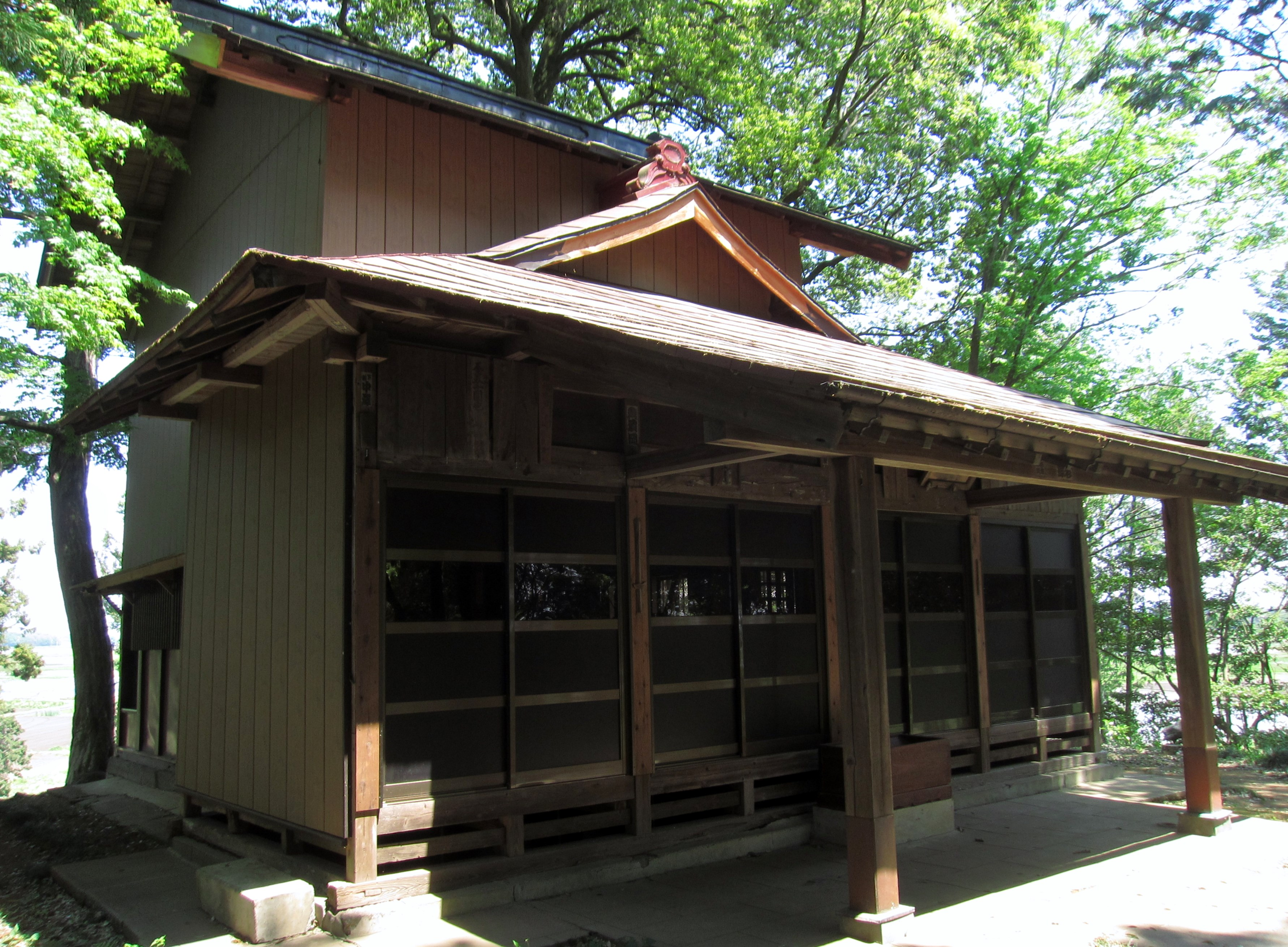
Chapel to Marishi-ten on the summit of the tumulus

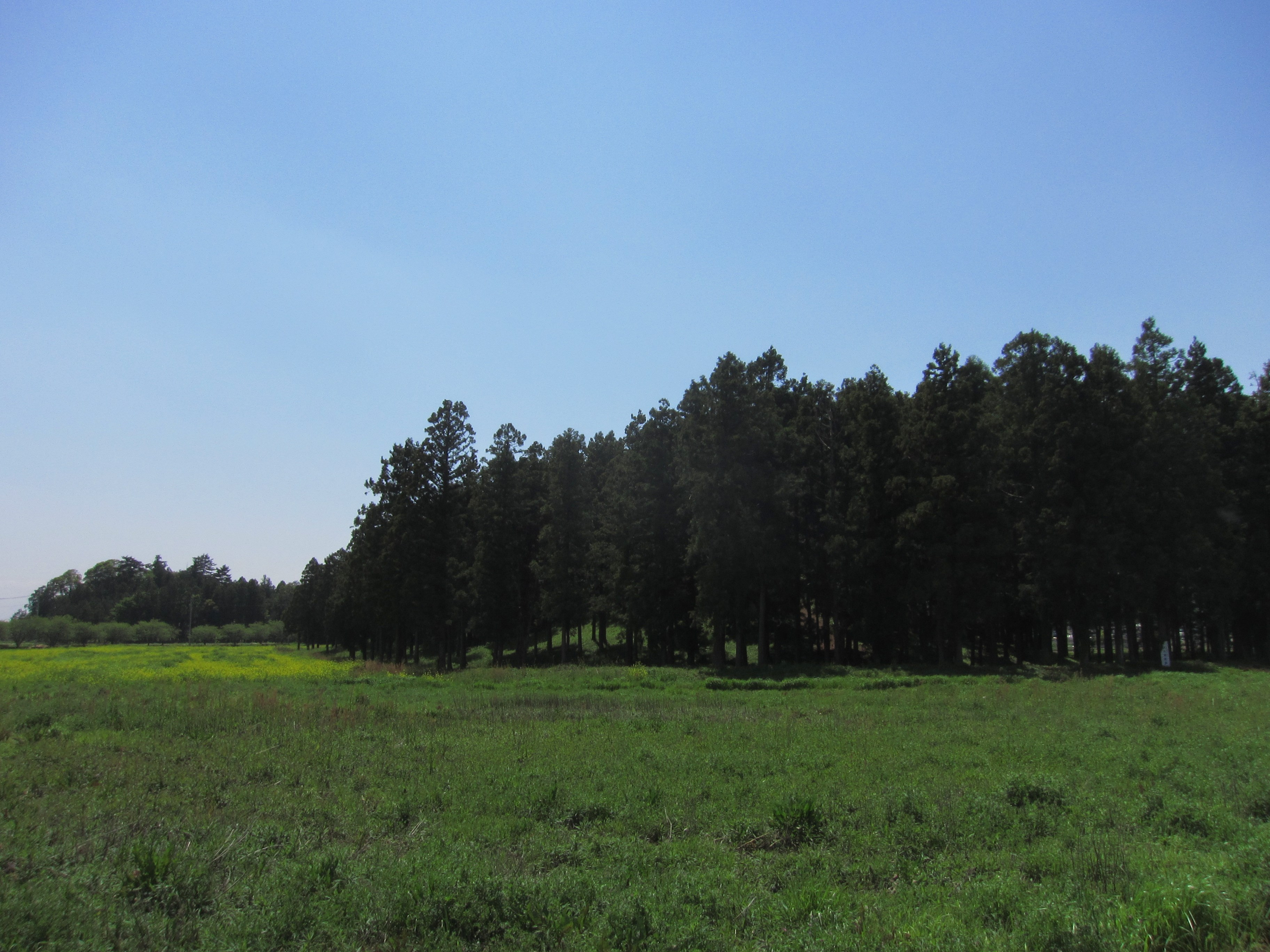
Biwazuka Kofun and Marishitenzuka Kofun

== See also ==
- List of Historic Sites of Japan (Tochigi)
