= Haniwa Warrior in Keiko Armor =

Warrior Haniwa from Gunma Prefecture

Haniwa in "Keiko" Armor
- 埴輪武装男子立像 (Haniwa busō danshi ritsuzō)
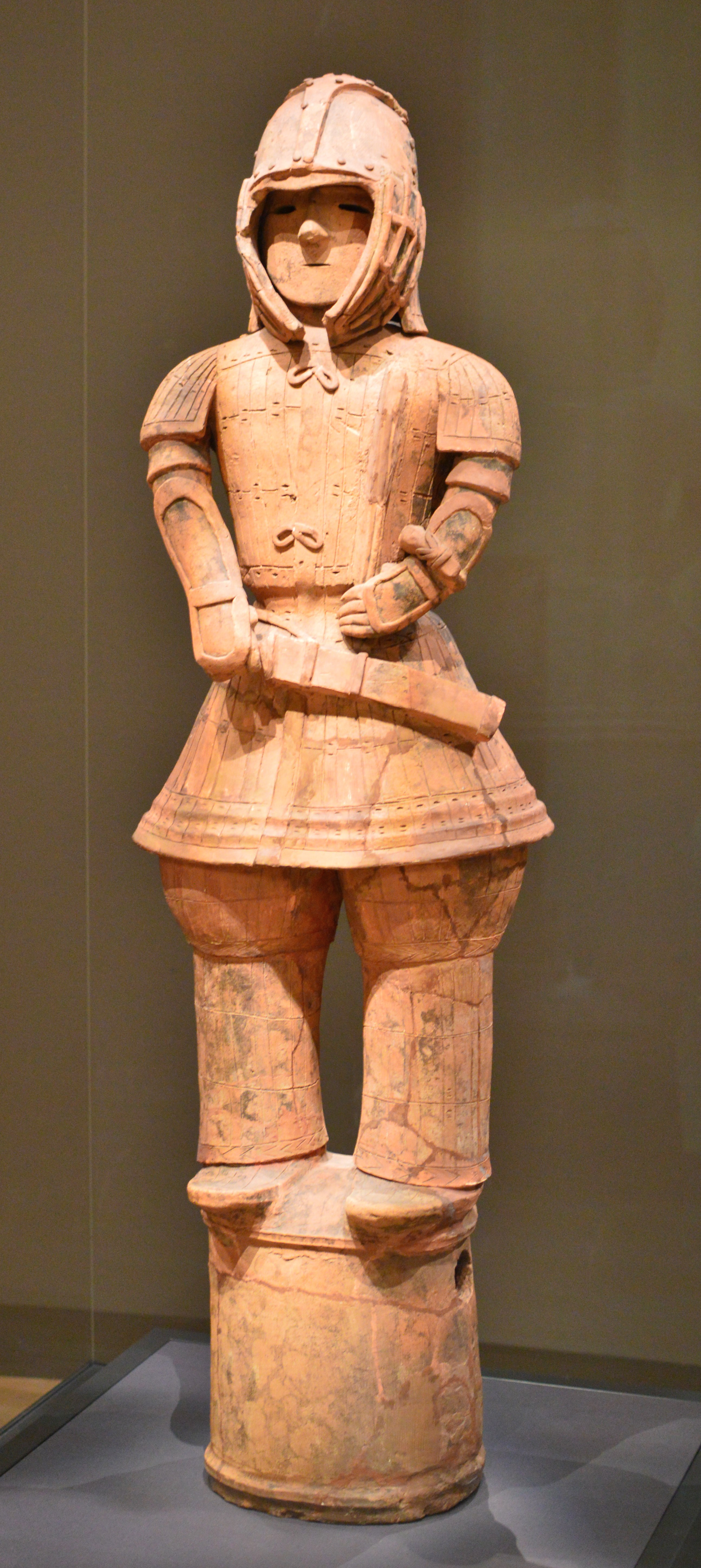
- Height: 130.5 cm (51.4 in)
- Created: 6th century
- Period/culture: Kofun period
- Discovered: Ota City, Gunma Prefecture, Japan
- Present location: Tokyo National Museum

The Haniwa Warrior in "Keiko" Armor (Japanese: 埴輪武装男子立像; Romaji: Haniwa busō danshi ritsuzō) is a 6th century haniwa sculpture of an armored warrior. Discovered in Gunma Prefecture, Japan, it is deemed a significant icon of Kofun period art, and a National Treasure. It is currently held by the Tokyo National Museum under ownership of the National Institutes for Cultural Heritage.

== History ==
The haniwa, sometimes designed as Haniwa Warrior, was discovered in excavations at Iizuka-cho, Ōta, Gunma, formerly Kugo Village, Nitta County. Initially designated Important Cultural Property on 2 February 1958, it was subsequently upgraded to National Treasure in 8 June 1974 under designation No.00035. It is designated as J-36697 in the collection of the Tokyo National Museum. Subsequently the haniwa has been portrayed on postage stamps, textbooks, and pop culture.

The sculpture subsequently saw conservation work from March 2017 to June 2019 with grants from the Bank of America. Conservation work revealed that the Haniwa was once painted in white, red, and gray.

From 16 October 2024 to 8 December 2024, the Tokyo National Museum commemorated its 50th anniversary as National Treasure with a special exhibit dedicated to Kofun art, displayed along with the Haniwa Terracotta Dancers and the Todaijiyama Sword.

== Description ==
Standing at 130.5 cm, the haniwa wears a short-sleeve body armor, portrayed as iron plates laced together. The armor is skirt-like (keiko), which protects the thighs. It wears a visorless-helmet (shôkakutsuki), depicted as metal, riveted together. The ear flaps are supposed to depict padded fabric or leather, tied together around the head and neck.

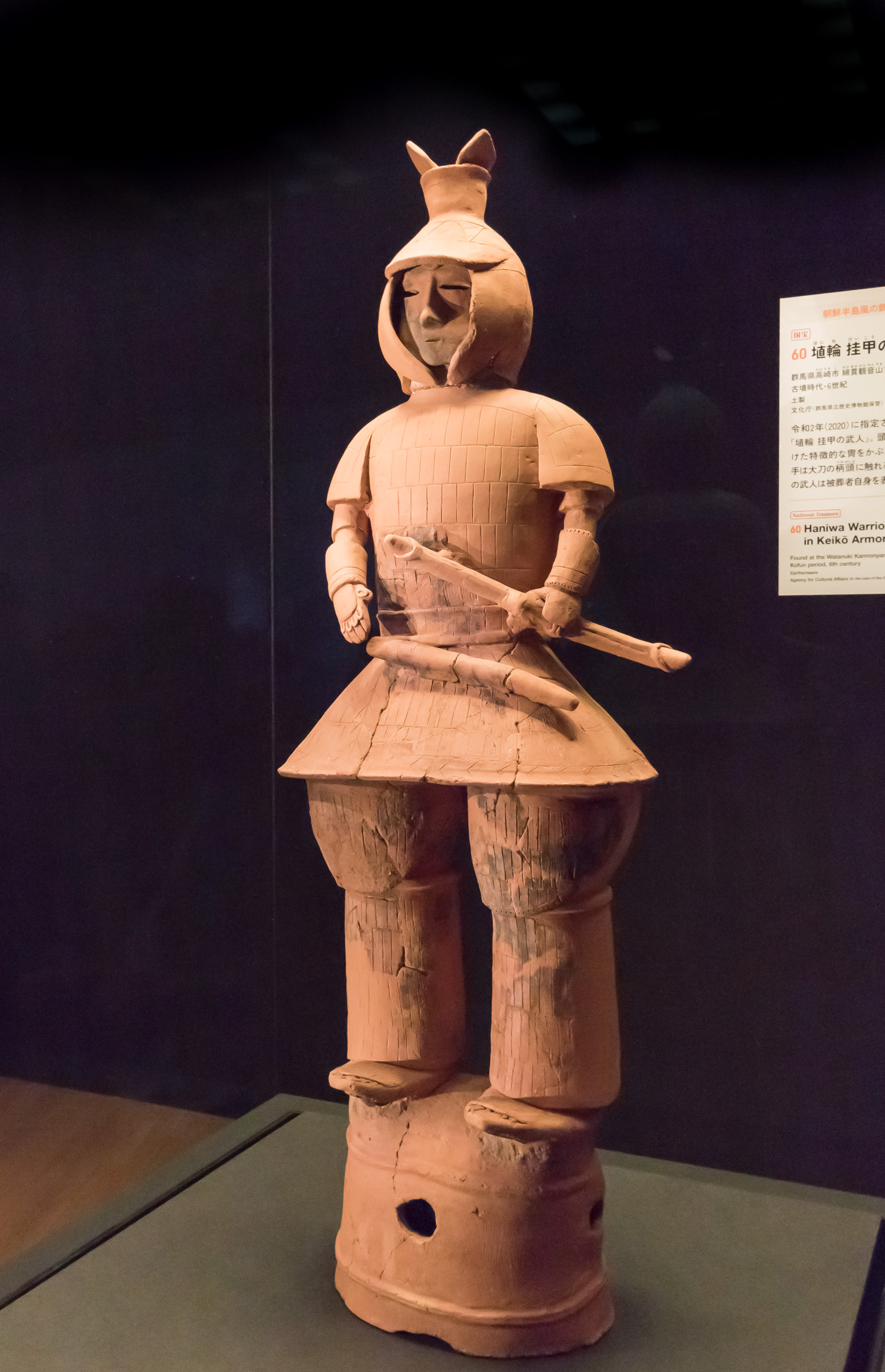
Watanuki Kannonyama Keiko Haniwa, Takasaki, Gunma Prefecture - designated National Treasure in 2020

The armor has padded shoulder guards and the warrior is armed with a thick sword, a bow, and a quiver. Its left hand is wrapped in protective gear, and the quiver holds five arrows, head pointing upwards. Overall, the warrior is depicted as fully equipped, with the finer details meticulously rendered.

The haniwa's face is mask-like, with narrow slits for eyes, a protruding nose, and a slit for the mouth.

While this haniwa was the only type designated a National Treasure until 2020 (given to the Keiko-armored Haniwa from the Watanuki Kannonyama Kofun), there are six total Haniwa Warriors of this type known to exist, all found and excavated within Ota City, Gunma, indicating they were made in the same pottery studio.

Only one warrior exists outside of Japan, at the Seattle Art Museum. Excavated in Gunma in the 1930s, it was subsequently acquired by the museum via art dealer Mayuyama and Co. Ltd. in January 1962.

=== Additional Complete Haniwa Warriors ===
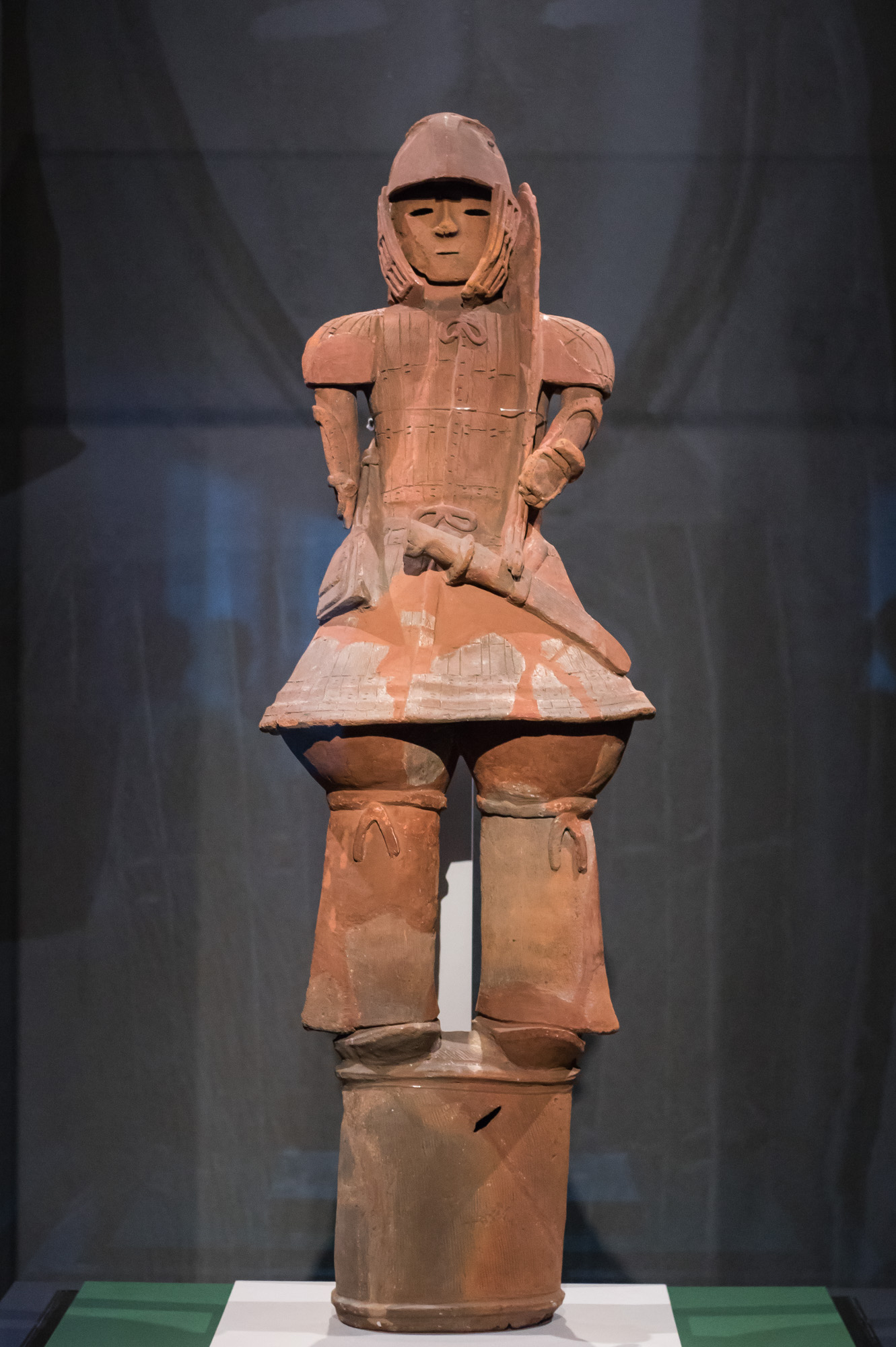
Serada Tomb No. 37, Serada-cho, Gunma Prefecture, Tenri University (Important Cultural Property)

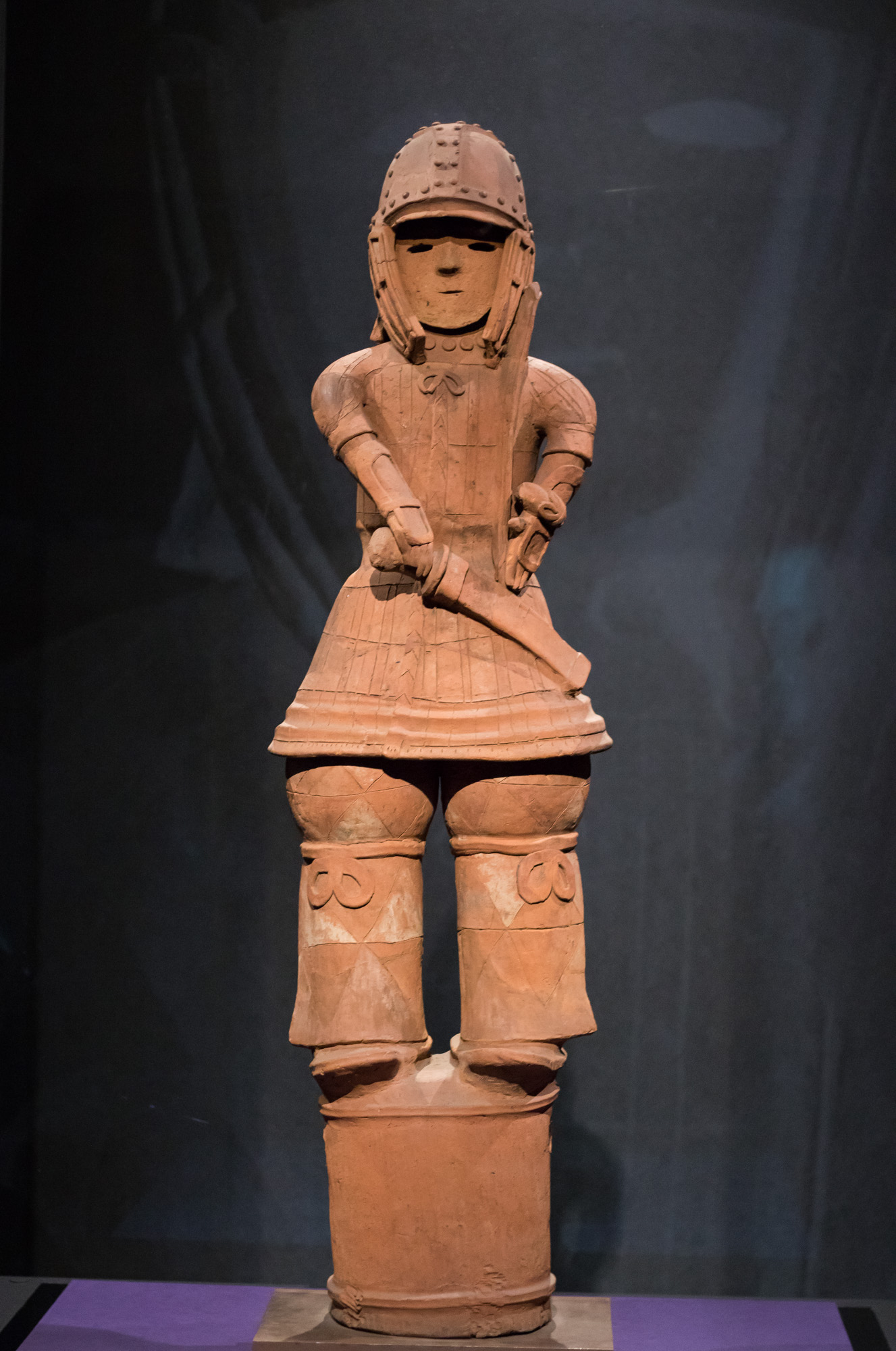
Ota City, Gunma, Aikawa Archaeological Museum (Important Cultural Property)

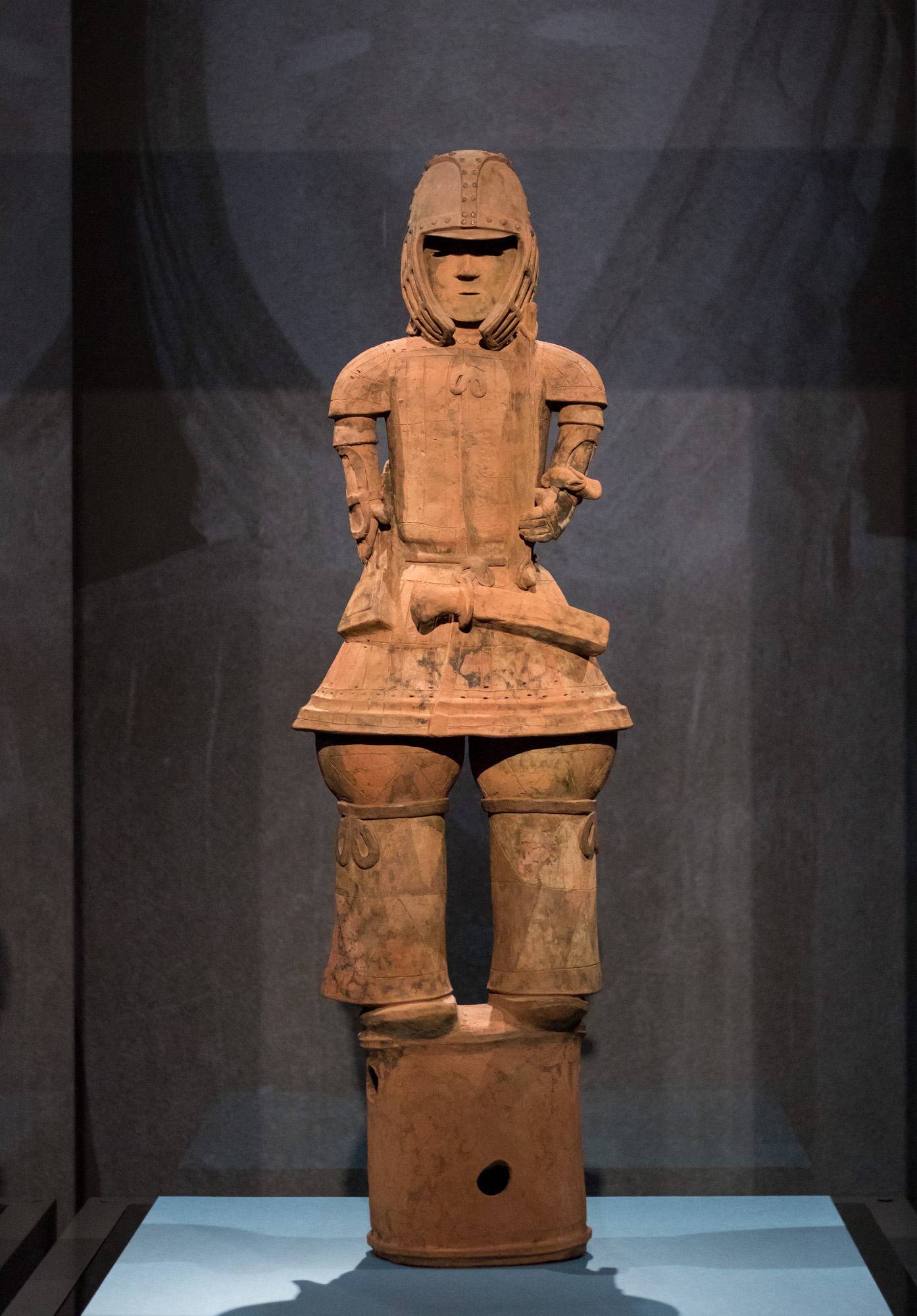
Ota City, Gunma Prefecture, Seattle Art Museum, Washington

== See also ==
- List of National Treasures of Japan (archaeological materials)
