= Jōurugami Kofun =

Kofun period keyhole-shaped burial mound in Japan

- 佐味田宝塚古墳 (Japanese)
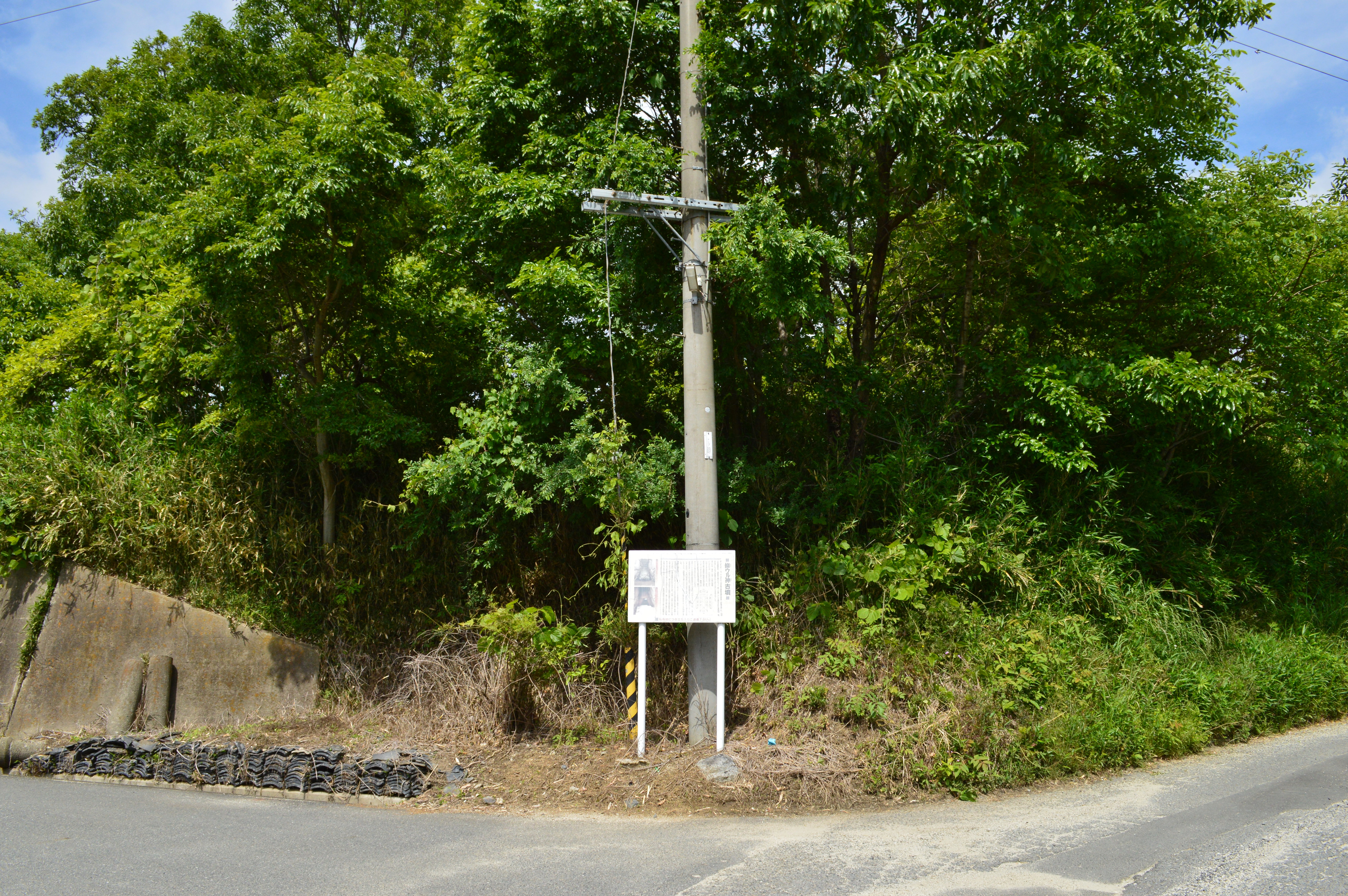
- Jōurugami Kofun

- Jōurugami Kofun Jōurugami Kofun (Japan)
- Interactive map of Jōurugami Kofun
- 34°26′35.25″N 135°44′39.45″E
- Type: Kofun
- Periods: Kofun period
- Location: Gose, Nara, Japan
- Region: Kansai region

History
- Built: c.6th century

Site notes
- Public access: Yes (no facilities)

Jōurugami Kofun (條ウル神古墳) is a Kofun period burial mound, located in the city of Gose, Nara in the Kansai region of Japan. The tumulus was designated a National Historic Site of Japan in 2021.

== Overview ==
The Jōurugami Kofun is located on the southwestern edge of the Nara Basin. The Koseyama Kofun Cluster (more than 700 tombs in total) is distributed in the hills to the south, and this tumulus was designated Koseyama Kofun No.658 in 1984. The mound of this tumulus has been largely leveled, and archaeological excavations have been unable to confirm if the original configuration was a zenpō-kōen-fun (前方後円墳), which is shaped like a keyhole, having one square end and one circular end, when viewed from above, or a hōfun (方墳) rectangular tumulus. The total length of the tumulus is about 70 meters and was orientated to the south-southeast. The burial facility is a double-sided horizontal-entry type stone burial chamber in the posterior circular portion (northern mound), in which a house-shaped stone coffin is located. It is a large stone chamber more than 15.6 meters in total length. The size of the sarcophagus's cover stone is 278 cm in length, 147 cm in width, and 53 cm in height, making it comparable to the Gojyo-no-Maruyama Kofun (289 cm in length) from the same period. The cover stone also has eight rope protrusions, one on each side and three on each side, making it unusual compared to the two on each side of a typical house-shaped sarcophagus. The size of the burial chamber and sarcophagus is comparable to that of Gojyo-no-Maruyama Kofu in Kashihara (possibly the tomb of Emperor Kinmei) and Ishibutai Kofun in Asuka, and the characteristics of the burial chamber and sarcophagus are the same as those of the surrounding Koseyama Kofun group. Excavated grave goods include fragments of Sue ware pottery and haniwa clay figurines. The construction date of the tumulus is estimated to be around the latter half of the 6th century during the late Kofun period.

It is also believed that another burial facility existed in the anterior portion (southern mound), as fragments of the stone walls of a burial chamber and stone material of the sarcophagus have been found, but the details are unclear as the mound has been was destroyed.

The tumulus is about 2.5 kilometers south of Tamade Station on the JR West Wakayama Line.

== See also ==
- List of Historic Sites of Japan (Nara)
