= Ushizuka Kofun (Mibu) =

Burial mound in Tochigi Prefecture, Japan

Ushiuzuka Kofun
- 牛塚古墳 (Japanese)
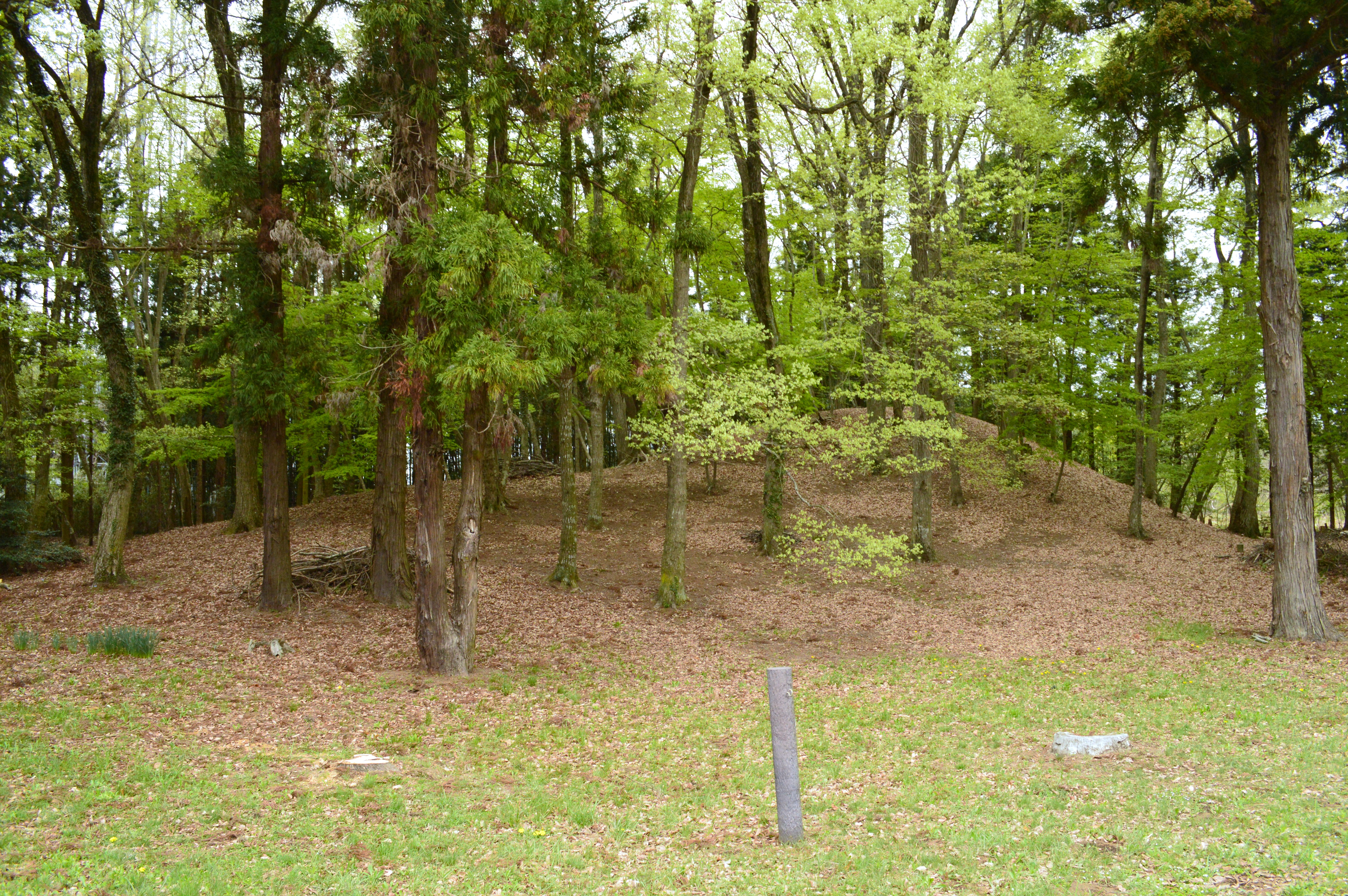
- Ushizuka Kofun

- Ushiuzuka Kofun Ushizuka Kofun (Mibu) (Japan)
- 36°26′14.3″N 139°48′27.6″E
- Type: kofun
- Periods: Kofun period
- Location: Mibu, Tochigi, Japan
- Region: Kantō region

History
- Built: late 6th century AD

Site notes
- Public access: Yes (park)

Shimotsuke Kofun cluster（Mibu area）

The Ushizuka Kofun (牛塚古墳) is a scallop-shaped Kofun period burial mound located in the town of Mibu, Shimotsuga District, Tochigi Prefecture in the northern Kantō region of Japan. It received protection as a National Historic Site in 1926.

== Overview ==
The Ushizuka Kofun is located on the south bank of the Kurokawa River, to the northeast of the center of Mibu Town. It is part of a group of tumuli which include the nearby Kurumazuka Kofun and Atagozuka Kofun, which have different shapes, and which have separate National Historic Site designations. The Kuramazuka Kofun, the largest in Tochigi Prefecture, is adjacent to the east, while the Atagozuka Kofun is located 450 meters to the south.

The tumulus is a hotategai-gata-kofun (帆立貝形古墳), which is similar to a zenpō-kōen-fun, but with the anterior rectangular portion very short and wide, so that the tumulus is shaped like a scallop shell when viewed from above. The tumulus is constructed in two tiers, with the base platform having a total length of 46.5 meters. The base has a circular platform that is 34.5 meters in diameter and a rectangular extension with width of 25 meters, and is five meters high. It is surrounded by a moat. On this platform, the kofun itself was constructed, with a length of 40 meters circular portion with diameter of 27.6 meters. It has never been excavated, but from its design of the mound and from fragments of haniwa which have been recovered from the vicinity, it is estimated to date from the late-6th century AD. This was a period of transition between the Kofun period when the Shimotsuke area was ruled by semi-independent local kings owing fealty to the centralized Yamato state. Its size, and location near other large tumuli and the site of the Shimotsuke Kokubun-ji indicate the importance of this region in Kofun period Shimotsuke.

The Ushiuzuka Kofun is about a 20-minute walk from Mibu Station on the Tōbu Railway Tōbu Utsunomiya Line.

Shimotsukke Kofun cluster（Mibu area）
Name	Type		Date	Status
Atagozuka Kofun	zenpō-kōen-fun	length 82m	llate 6c	NHS
Ushizuka Kofun	scallop	length 50m	late 6c	NHS
Kurumazuka Kofun	enpun	84m diameter	early 7c	NHS

== See also ==
- List of Historic Sites of Japan (Tochigi)
