= Atagozuka Kofun (Mibu) =

Japanese burial mound

- 愛宕塚古墳 (Japanese)
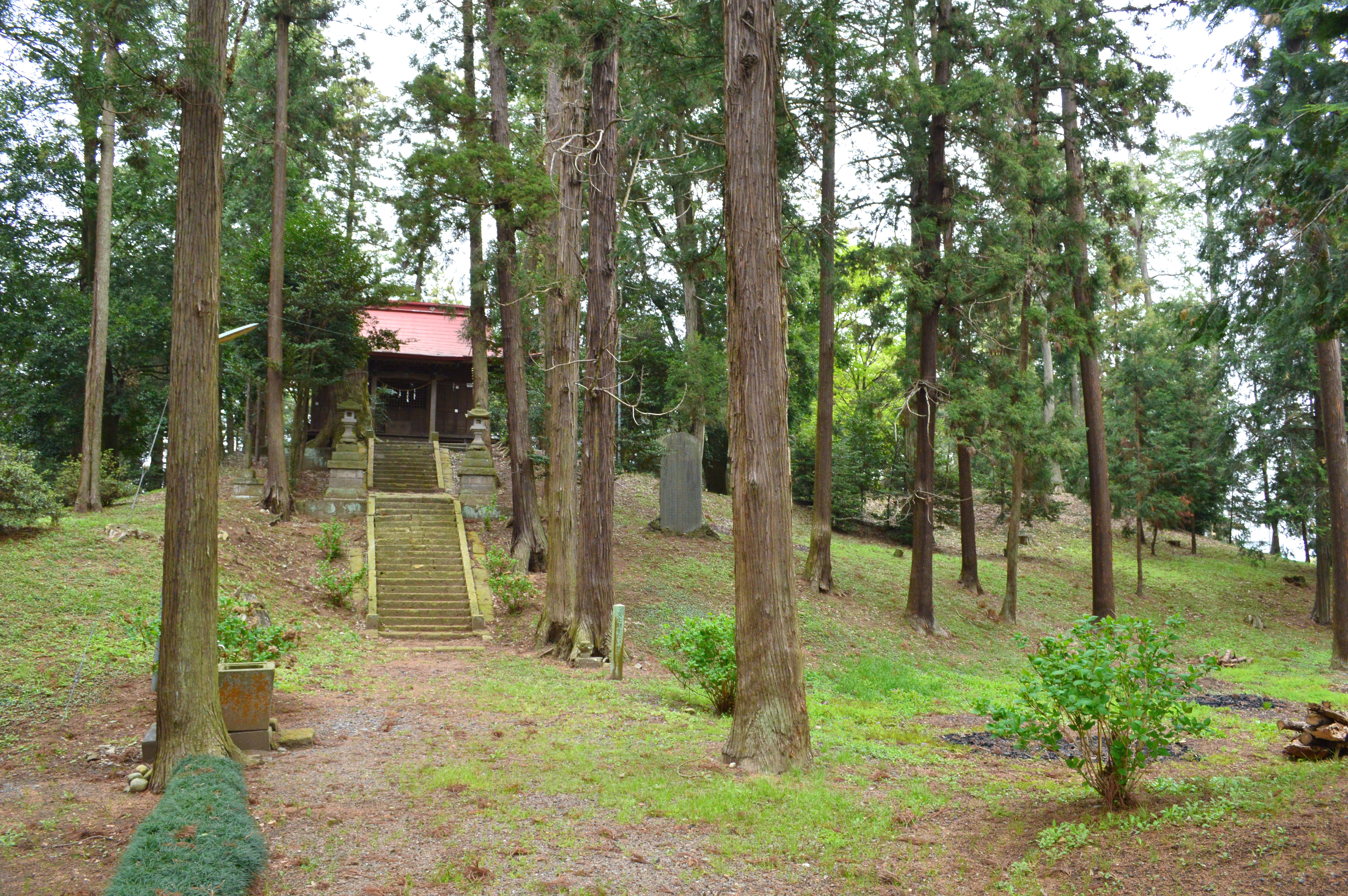
- Atago Jinja located on Atagozuka Kofun

- Atagozuka Kofun Atagozuka Kofun (Mibu) (Japan)
- 36°25′57.7″N 139°48′35.9″E
- Type: kofun
- Periods: Kofun period
- Location: Mibu, Tochigi, Japan
- Region: Kantō region

History
- Built: mid 6th century AD

Site notes
- Public access: Yes

Shimotsuke Kofun cluster（Mibu area）

Atagozuka Kofun (愛宕塚古墳) is a Kofun period burial mound located in the town of Mibu, Shimotsuga District, Tochigi Prefecture in the northern Kantō region of Japan. It received protection as a National Historic Site in 1926.

== Overview ==
The Atagozuka Kofun is a zenpō-kōen-fun (前方後円墳), which is shaped like a keyhole, having one square end and one circular end, when viewed from above. It is located on the west bank of the Kurokawa River, in the northeast of the town center of Mibu Town, and is part of a group of tumuli, which include the nearby Kurumazuka Kofun and Ushizuka Kofun, which have different shapes, and which have separate National Historic Site designations. The tumulus is constructed in two tiers and has a total length of 77 meters for the bottom tier and 53 meters for the upper tier. This construction is typical of kofun in this region and period for the rectangular portion to be larger and taller than the circular portion. The tumulus was surrounded by a moat with a width of over twenty meters, portions of which survive.

Overall length
77 meters
Posterior circular portion
23 meter diameter x 5.5 meter high, 2-tier
Anterior rectangular portion
35 meters wide x 6 meter high, 2-tier

The tumulus has never been excavated and details of the burial chamber are unknown, but from the design of the tumulus and from fragments of haniwa (including one of a man in armor) and Sue ware pottery which have been recovered from the vicinity, it is estimated to date from the mid-6th century AD. This was a period of transition between the Kofun period when the Shimotsuke area was ruled by independent local kings and the Asuka period, when the centralized Yamato state dominated. Its size, and location near other large tumuli and the site of the Shimotsuke Kokubun-ji indicate the importance of this region in Kofun period Shimotsuke.

The top of the tumulus is occupied by a Shinto shrine (the Atago Shrine) from which the kofun gets its name. This shrine was built in 1694 by Matsudaira Terusada, daimyō of Mibu Domain, as it was located in the Kimon, or "unlucky direction" from Mibu Castle.

The Atagoyama Kofun is about a 15-minute walk from Mibu Station on the Tōbu Railway Tōbu Utsunomiya Line.

Shimotsukke Kofun cluster（Mibu area）
Name	Type		Date	Status
Atagozuka Kofun	zenpō-kōen-fun	length 82m	llate 6c	NHS
Ushizuka Kofun	scallop	length 50m	late 6c	NHS
Kurumazuka Kofun	enpun	84m diameter	early 7c	NHS

== See also ==
- List of Historic Sites of Japan (Tochigi)
