= Kurumazuka Kofun (Mibu) =

7th century CE burial ground in Japan

- 車塚古墳 (Japanese)
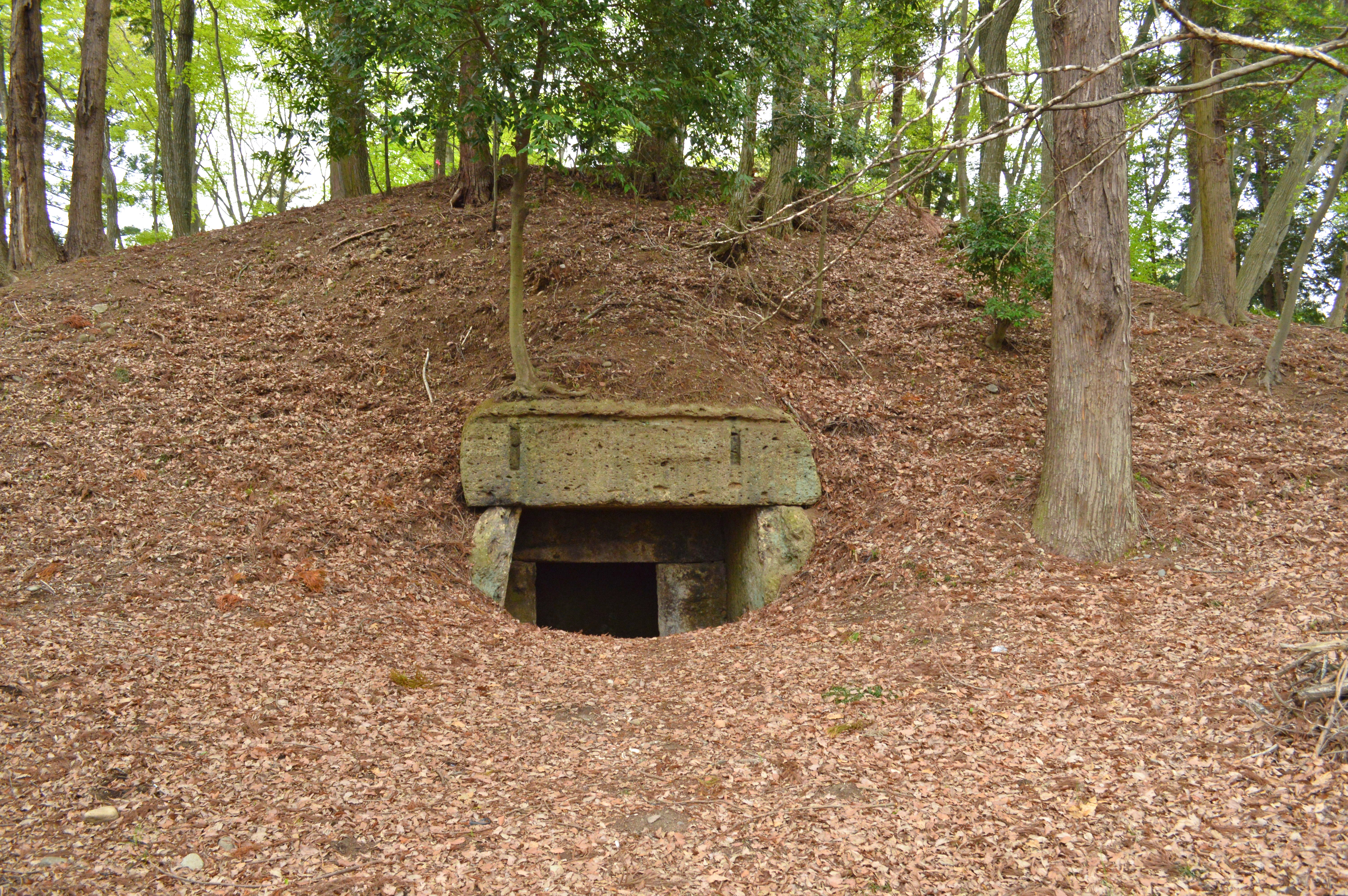
- Kurumazuka Kofun

- Kurumazuka Kofun Kurumazuka Kofun (Mibu) (Japan)
- 36°26′13.9″N 139°48′34.0″E
- Type: kofun
- Periods: Kofun period
- Location: Mibu, Tochigi, Japan
- Region: Kantō region

History
- Built: early 7th century AD

Site notes
- Public access: Yes

Shimotsuke Kofun cluster（Mibu area）

Kurumazuka Kofun (車塚古墳) is a Kofun period burial mound located in the town of Mibu, Shimotsuga District, Tochigi Prefecture in the northern Kantō region of Japan. It received protection as a National Historic Site in 1926.

== Overview ==
The Kurumazuka Kofun is a dome-shaped (empun (円墳)) kofun located on a river terrace on the left bank of the Kurokawa River, to the northeast of the town center of Mibu Town. It is one of the largest round burial mounds in Japan and is part of a group of tumuli which include the nearby Ushizuka Kofun and Atagozuka Kofun, which have different shapes, and which have separate National Historic Site designations. The Ushizuka Kofun is adjacent to the western side, while the Atagozuka Kofun is located 500 meters to the south.

The tumulus has a diameter of 82 meters and a height of eight meters, with a flat surface on the top of the dome. It was constructed in three tiers, with the diameter of 82 meters at the bottom, 52 meters at the middle tier and 32 meters at the upper tier. It was once covered in fukiishi revetment stones, some traces of which remain, but no haniwa clay figures have been found. Archaeological excavations have confirmed that it was once surrounded by an outer dike and two rings of moats with a width of 7.5 meters. The tomb was pillaged in ancient times, leaving only the well-preserved horizontal-entry stone burial chamber made from blocks of tuff, which has been open to the elements since at least the Edo period. The burial chamber has dimensions of three meters long by 2.8 meters wide by 2.3 meters high with a 1.35 meter high entrance.

The lack of haniwa or grave goods complicates dating, but the tumulus is estimated to date from the early 7th century AD. This was a period of transition between the Kofun period and the Asuka period when the Shimotsuke area was ruled by semi-independent local kings and the centralized Yamato state. Its size, and location near other large tumuli and the site of the Shimotsuke Kokubun-ji indicate the importance of this region in Kofun period Shimotsuke.

The Kurumazuka Kofun is about a 20-minute walk from Mibu Station on the Tōbu Railway Tōbu Utsunomiya Line.

Shimotsukke Kofun cluster（Mibu area）
| Name | Type | | Date | Status |
|---|---|---|---|---|
| Atagozuka Kofun | zenpō-kōen-fun | length 82m | llate 6c | NHS |
| Ushizuka Kofun | scallop | length 50m | late 6c | NHS |
| Kurumazuka Kofun | enpun | 84m diameter | early 7c | NHS |

== Gallery ==
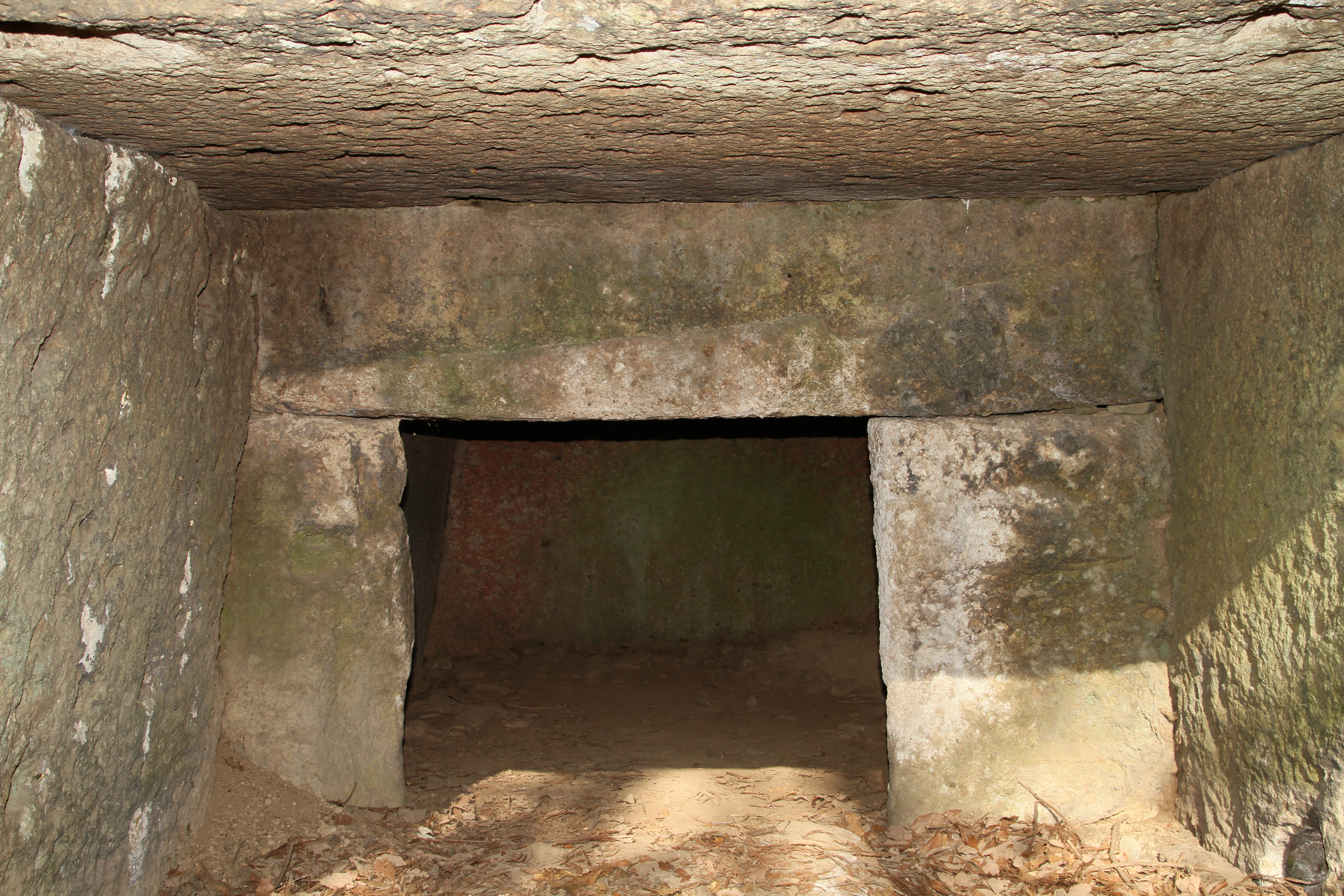
entry to the burial chamber

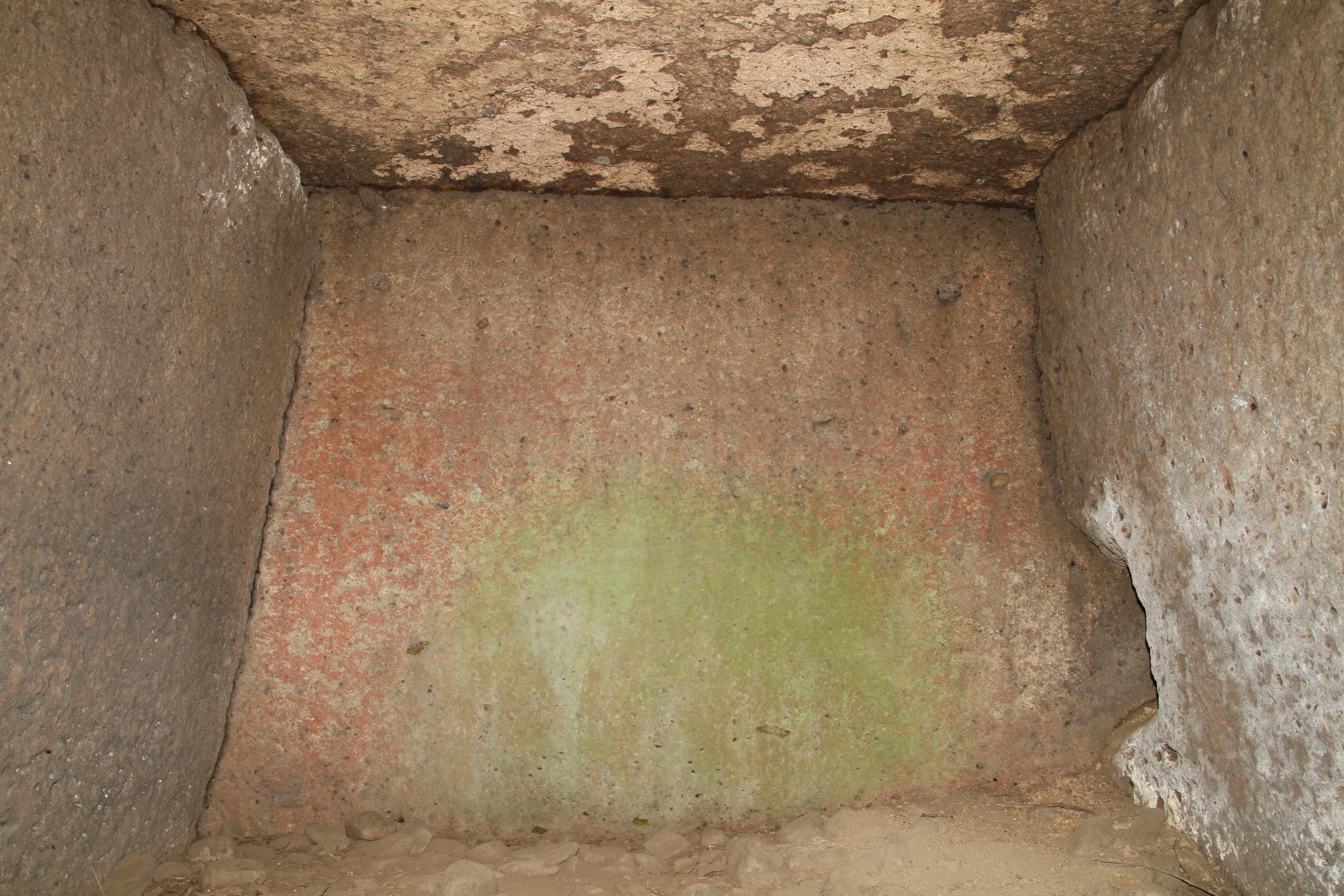
Inside the burial chamber

== See also ==
- List of Historic Sites of Japan (Tochigi)
