= Koseyama Kofun Cluster =

- 巨勢山古墳群 (Japanese)
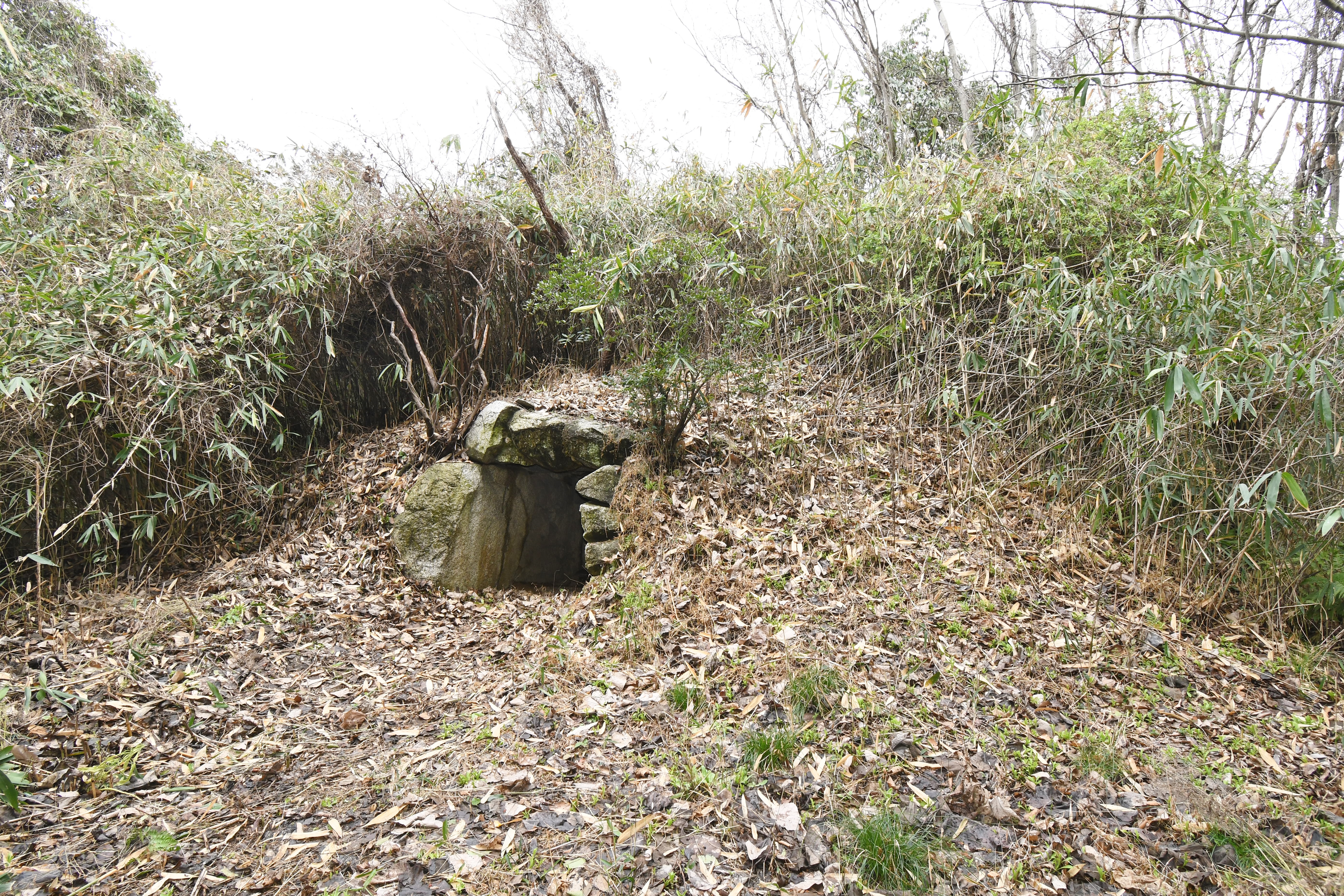
- Koseyama Kofun #323

- Koseyama Kofun Cluster Koseyama Kofun Cluster (Japan)
- Interactive map of Koseyama Kofun Cluster
- 34°26′35.5″N 135°44′39.5″E
- Type: Kofun
- Periods: Kofun period
- Location: Gose, Nara, Japan
- Region: Kansai region

History
- Built: c.5th-7th century

Site notes
- Public access: Yes (no facilities)

Koseyama Kofun cluster (巨勢山古墳群, Koseyama kofun-gun) is a group of Kofun period burial mounds, located in the Muro, Shiroyamadai, and Nishiterada neighborhoods of the city of Gose, Nara in the Kansai region of Japan. The tumulus ckuster was designated a National Historic Site of Japan in 2002. It is one of the largest clusters of ancient kofun in Japan.

== Overview ==
The Koseyama Kofun cluster is located in the southern part of the Nara Basin, within an area of 3.3 kilometers east-to-west and 3.5 kilometers north-to-south centered on the Koseyama Hills. It consists of approximately 700 burial mounds built from the mid-5th century to the late 6th century. Numerous groups of around ten burial mounds are spread out on the ridges branching off from the mountain range, and while the majority are small circular enpun (円墳)-style mounds with a diameter of around 10 to 20 meters, three zenpō-kōen-fun (前方後円墳), which is shaped like a keyhole, having one square end and one circular end, when viewed from above, with a total length of around 40 meters, a circular tomb with a diameter of around 30 meters, and a square hōfun (方墳)-style tumulus with a side length of around 10 to 20 meters have also been confirmed. The keyhole-shaped tombs are thought to have been built by the descendants of the Katsuragi clan, who held sway in this region in the 5th century, but the diversity of burial facilities and grave goods indicates that the other tombs were built by a variety of clans. Grave goods included weapons, horse equipment, ornaments, and earthenware, but the most notable are gilt bronze ornamental metal fittings, iron blacksmithing tools, and miniature hearth sets, which suggest connections to the Kinokawa River basin and the Korean Peninsula.

The Muro Miyayama Kofun was originally considered to be one of these tumuli, but has a separate National Historic Site designation.

The tumulus cluster is about 3.3 kilometers south of Tamade Station on the JR West Wakayama Line.

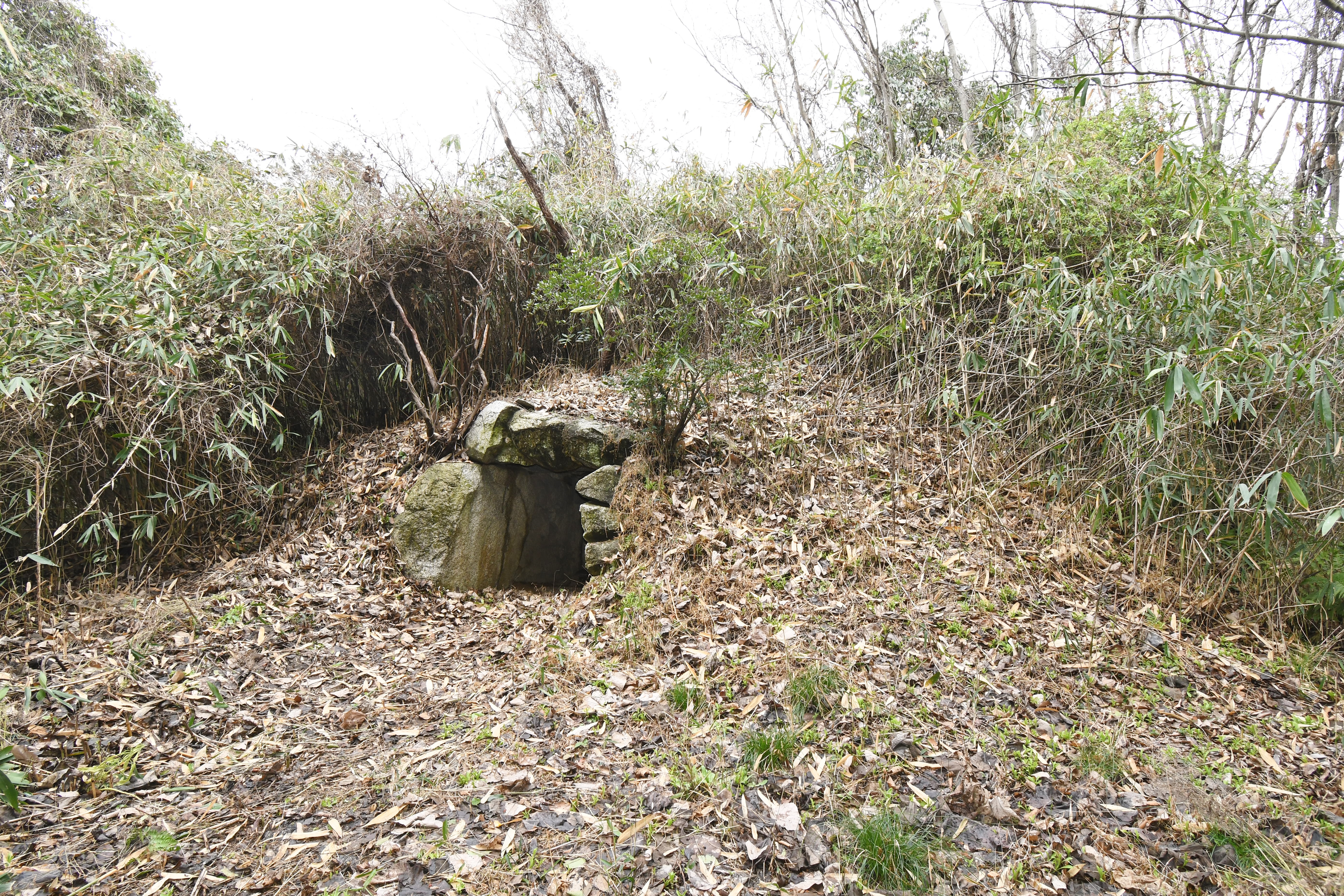
Kofun#322

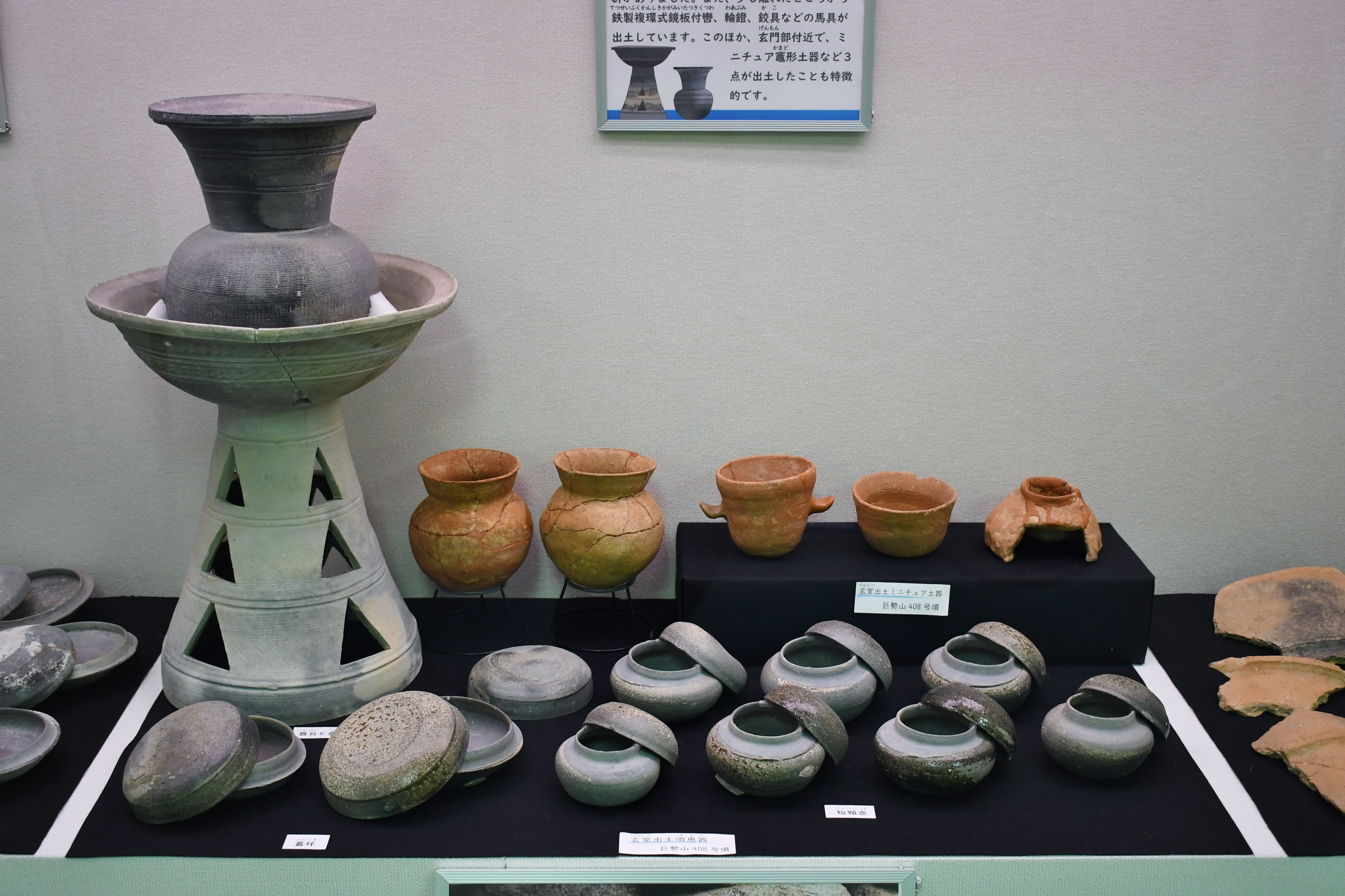
Sue ware from Kofun#408

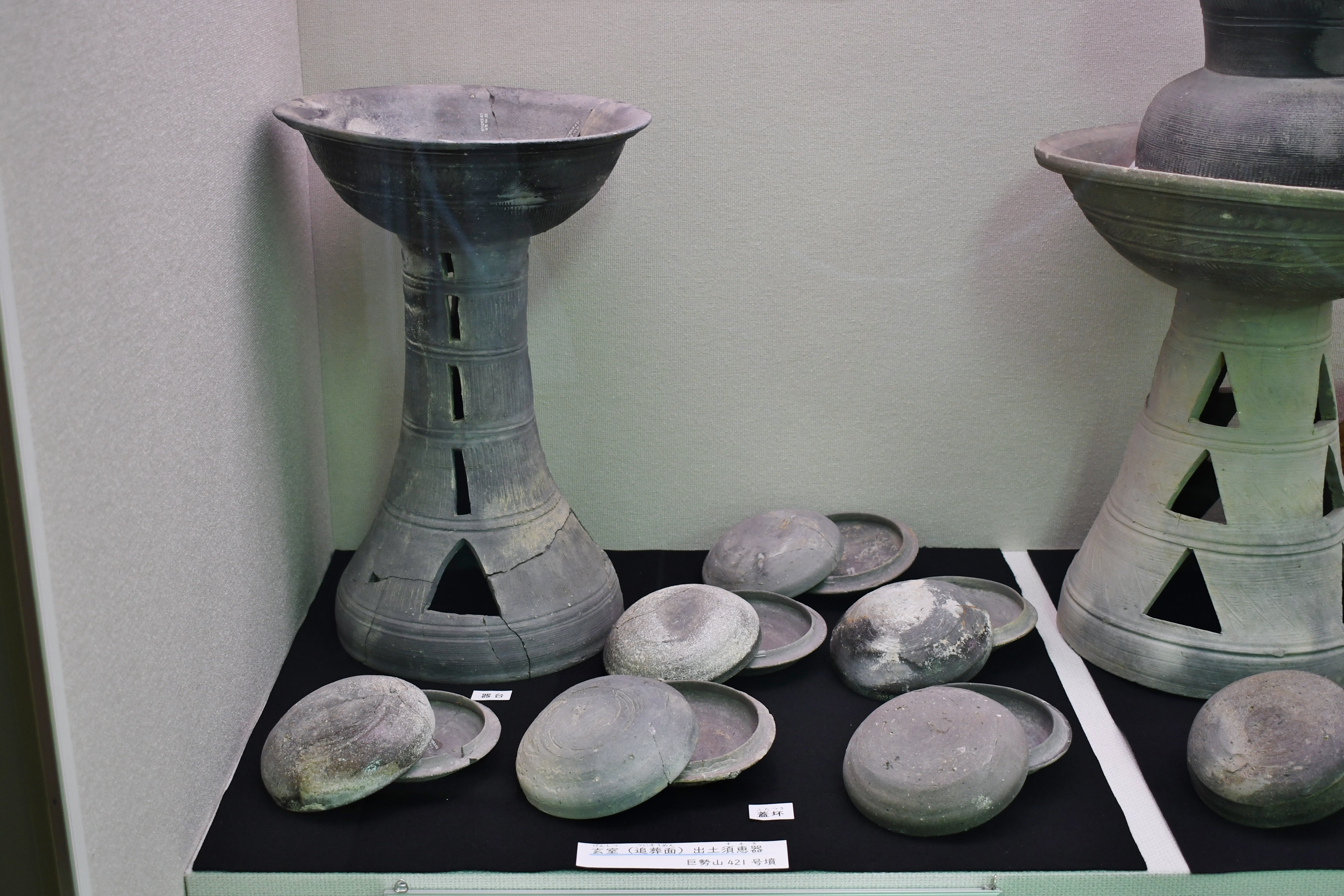
Sue ware from Kofun#421

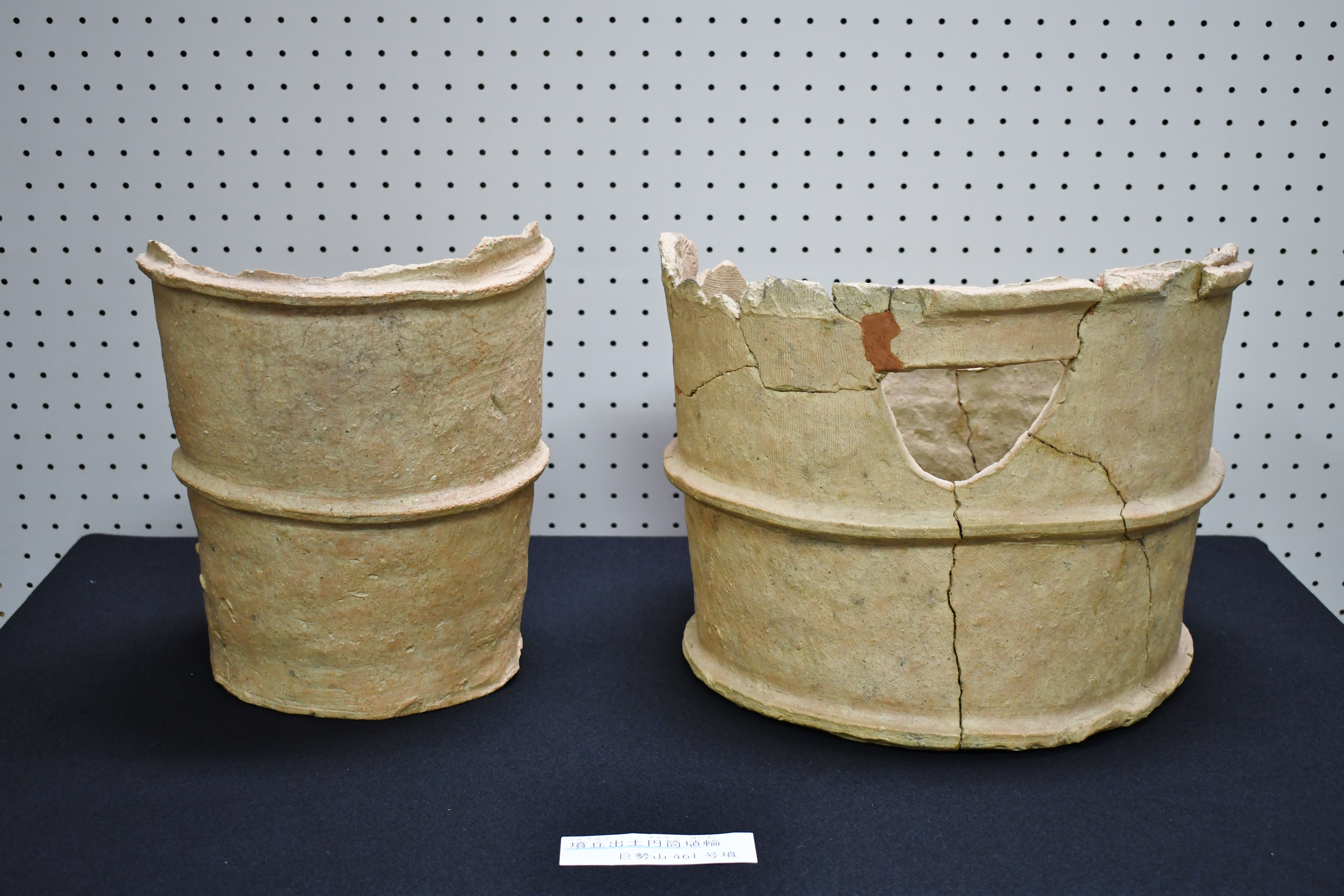
Haniwa from Kofun#461

== See also ==
- List of Historic Sites of Japan (Nara)
