= Watanuki Kannonyama Kofun =

Burial mound in Takasaki, Japan

Watanuke Kannonyama Kofun
- 綿貫観音山古墳 (Japanese)
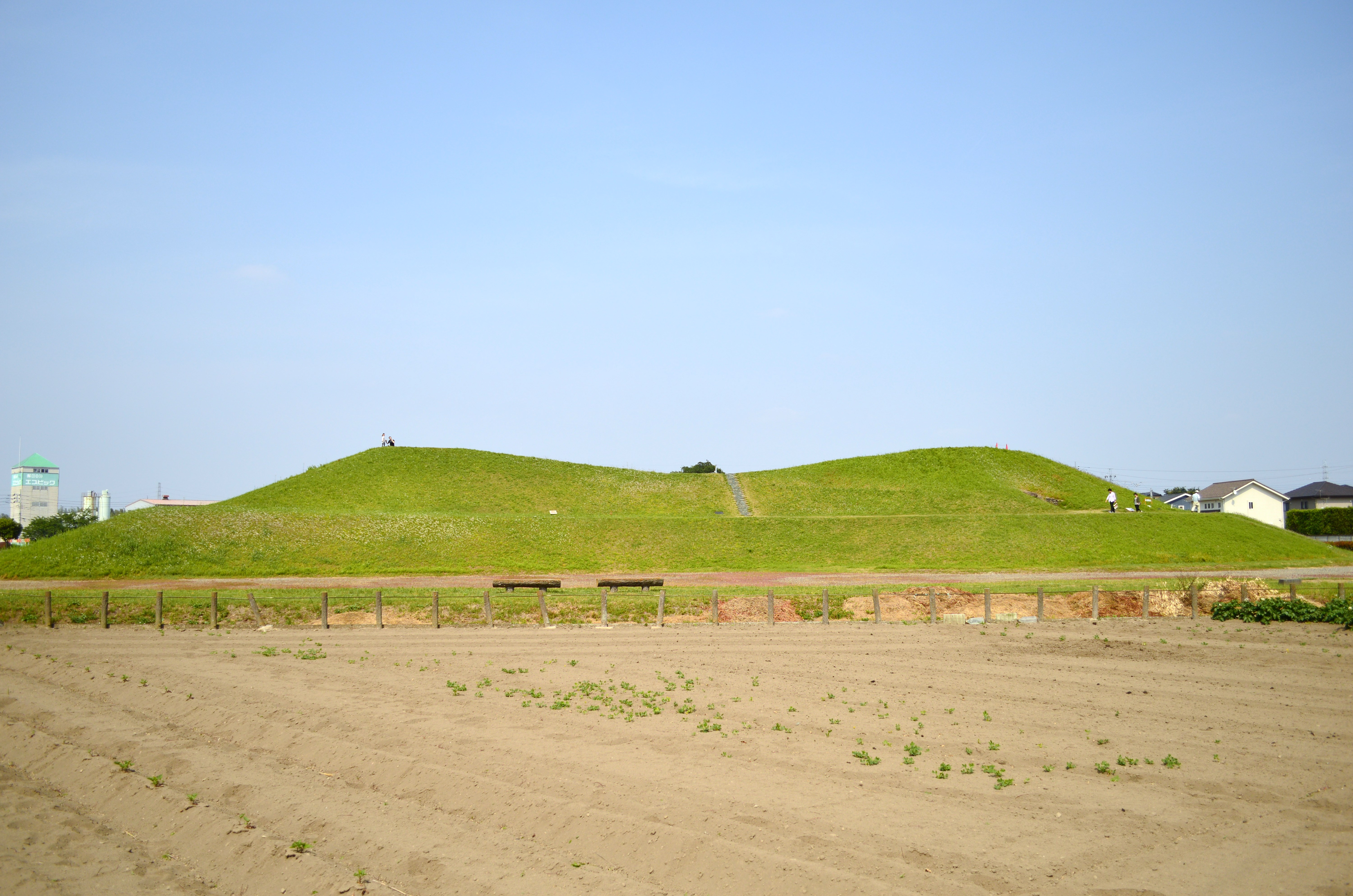
- Watanuke Kannonyama Kofun

- Watanuke Kannonyama Kofun Watanuki Kannonyama Kofun (Japan)
- 36°18′27″N 139°04′38″E
- Type: kofun
- Periods: Kofun period
- Location: Takasaki, Gunma, Japan
- Region: Kantō region

Site notes
- Discovered: 1973
- Public access: Yes (Museum at site)

The Watanuke Kannonyama Kofun (綿貫観音山古墳) is a Kofun period burial mound located in the Watanuki neighborhood of the city of Takasaki, Gunma Prefecture in the northern Kantō region of Japan. The site was designated a National Historic Site of Japan in 1973. The site dates from the late 6th Century, and many of the grave goods discovered during archaeological excavation were designated National Important Cultural Properties in 1994 In the year 2020, the collective status of 3346 artifacts from the tomb was raised to that of a National Treasure.

== Overview ==
The Watanuki Kannonyama Kofun is located on a plain on the west bank of the Ino River, six kilometers east of the city of Takasaki, and is constructed facing north. Its main dimensions are:

Total length
97 meters
Anterior rectangular portion
64 meters wide x 9.4 meters high, 2-tier
Posterior circular portion
61 meter diameter x 9.6 meters high, 2-tiers

An archaeological excavation was conducted by the Gunma Prefectural Board of Education from 1967 to 1968. The tumulus has a two-tiered construction and a double horseshoe-shaped moat. From the excavated Sue ware pottery, the date of construction is estimated to be the latter half of the 6th century AD. Haniwa were found in various locations around the tumulus, but no trace of fukiishi were discovered. The haniwa were of especial interest, as they depict men, women, boys and girls, in various costume, including what appear to be warriors in armor and with shields, farmers and aristocrats. There are also house-shaped haniwa and animal-shaped (horses and chicken) haniwa as well as haniwa shaped in the form of equipment and farm implements. Taken as a group, the haniwa appear to be narrating an event, possibly that of the accession of a new chief.

The burial chamber is a horizontal trapezoidal stone-lined room in the middle of the posterior circular portion, opening towards the southwest. It was found to be intact. The dimensions were the largest found in Gunma Prefecture, with a total length of 12.65 meters. The wall stones are andesite blocks, and the ceiling stones are sandstone. The blocks weigh up to 22 tons, but as there is no source for these materials from the neighborhood of the burial mound, it was necessary for these stones to be transported from a considerable distance to construct this tomb.

The grave goods included two bronze mirrors, gold, silver and glass jewelry, iron swords, iron spearheads, fragments of armor, horse harnesses, saddles, stirrups and Sue ware, Haji ware, copper water bottles and other containers, many of which were found to be in excellent preservation. These included copper water jars and iron helmets thought have been made in Northern Qi, and a copper water bottle and a mirror that were identical to objects excavated from the burial chamber of the Tomb of King Muryeong of Baekje in Gongju, South Korea. As these objects must have been cast from the same mould, it indicates a strong connection between the rulers of the Keno region of ancient Japan and the ancient Korean Peninsula.

The site was opened to the public as the first historic park in the prefecture in 1981. Some of the excavated items are on display at the Gunma Prefectural Historical Museum.

== Gallery ==
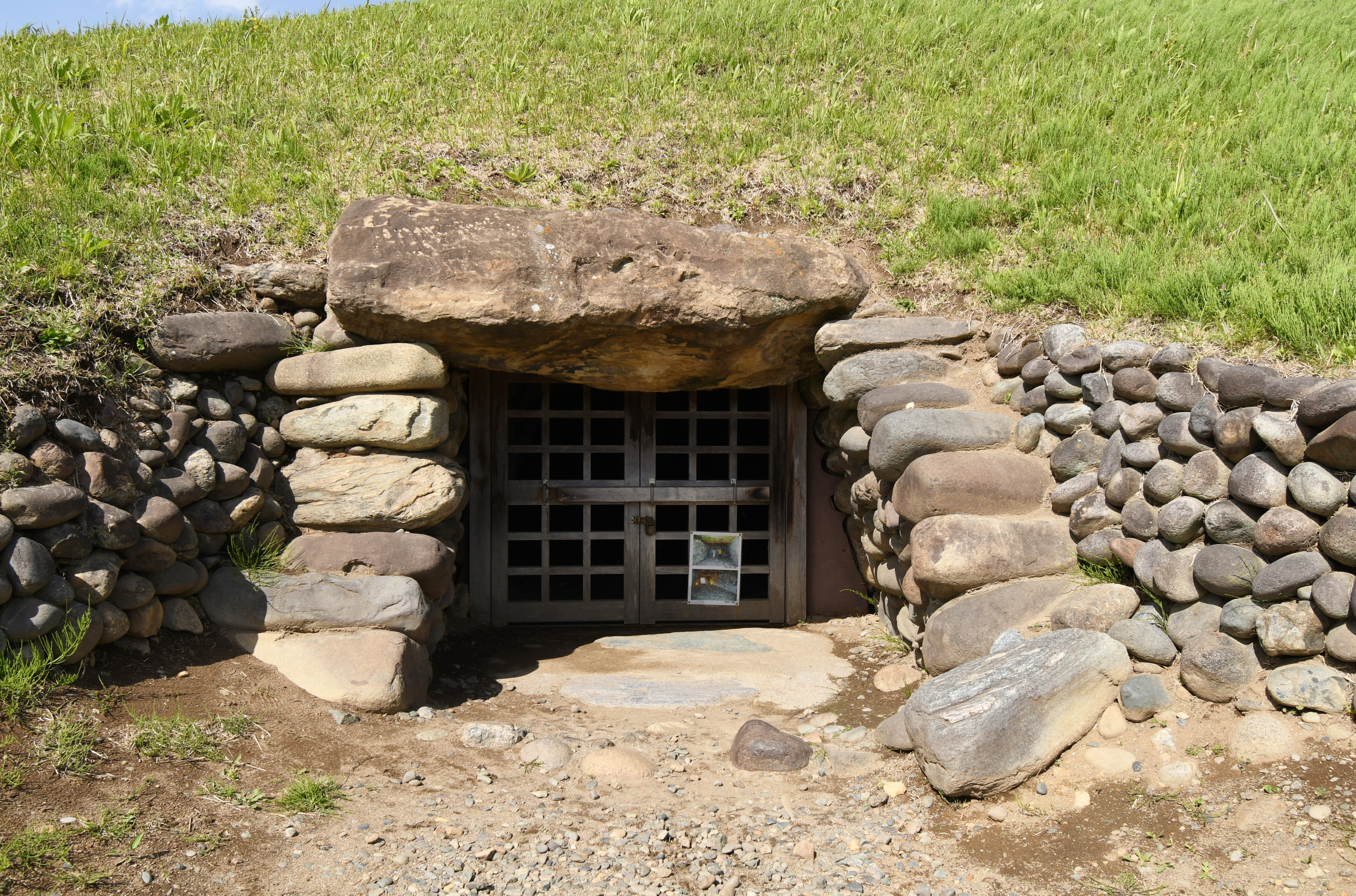
Entrance to burial chamber

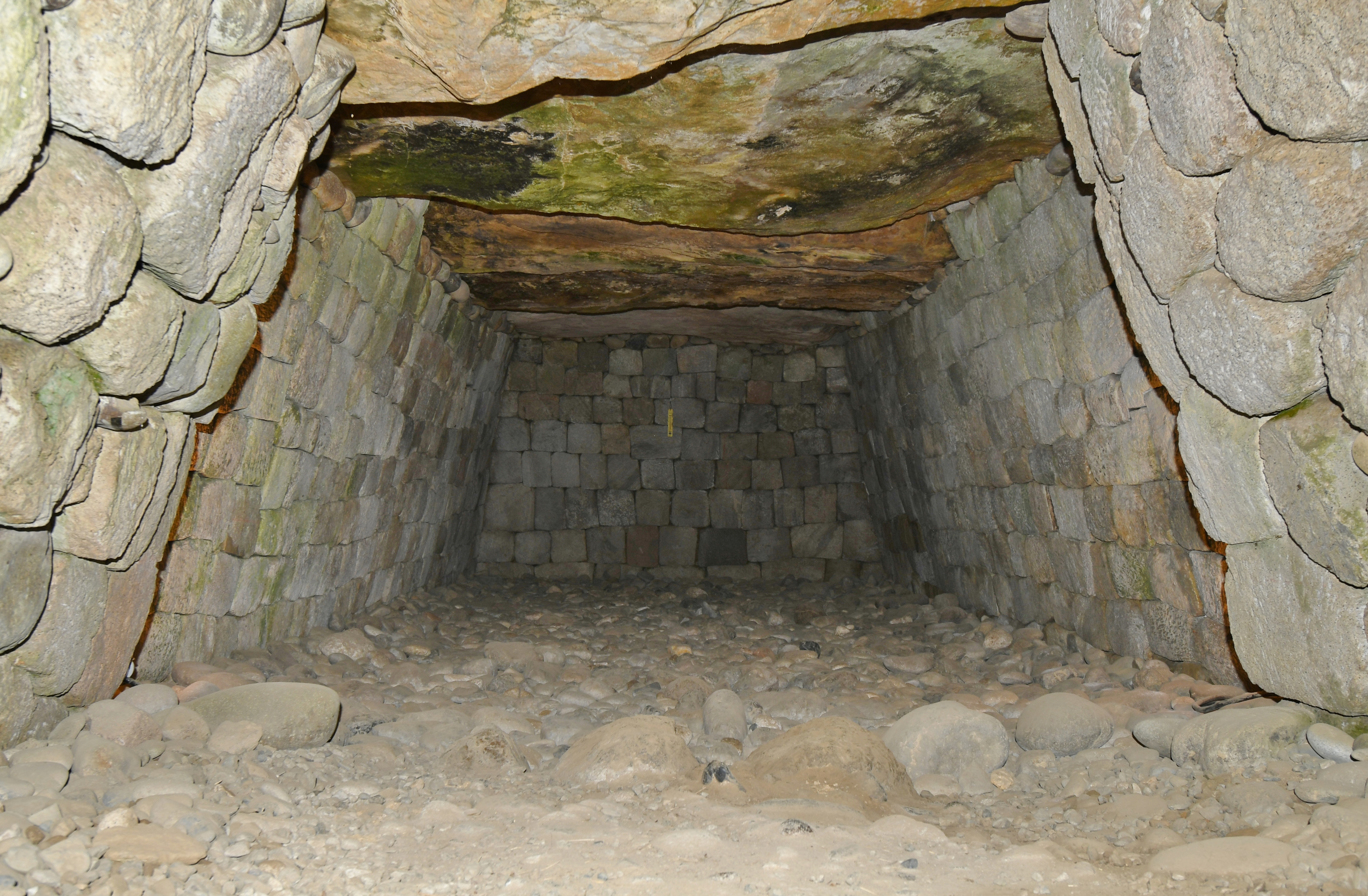
Inside burial chamber

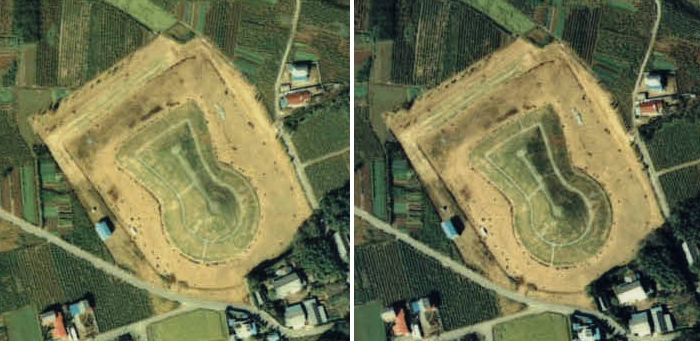
Stereoscopic view from above

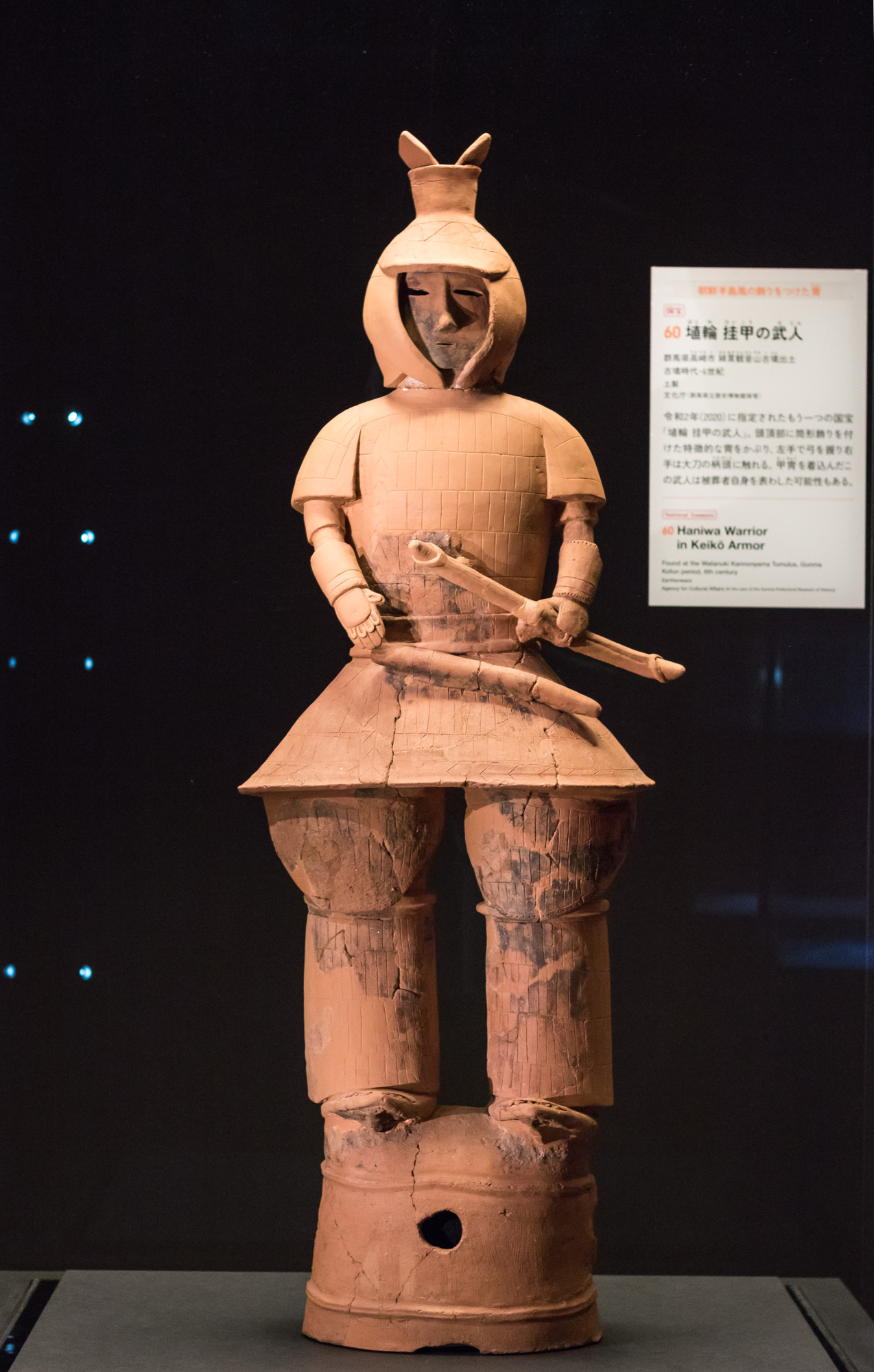
Watanuki Kannonyama Haniwa - designated National Treasure in 2020

== See also ==
- List of Historic Sites of Japan (Gunma)
- List of National Treasures of Japan (archaeological materials)
