= Haniwa Terracotta Dancers =

Statue in Japan

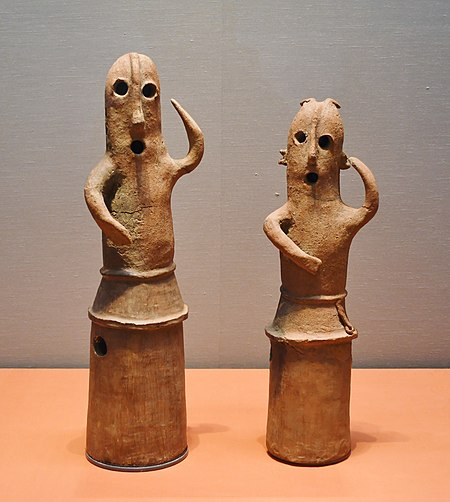
- The left haniwa is "large" and the right haniwa is "small"
- Year: 6th century
- Medium: Terracotta
- Location: Tokyo National Museum
- Accession: J-21428 (small); J-21429 (large）

The Haniwa Terracotta Dancers (埴輪 踊る人々, haniwa odoru hitobito; lit. 'haniwa dancing people') are a pair of human-shaped terracotta burial figures – haniwa – one smaller than the other, in the collection of the Tokyo National Museum. Their gestures with their arms have led them to be given the epithet of 'Dancers'.

== Overview ==
The Haniwa Terracotta Dancers were excavated on March 21, 1930, from the Nohara Tumulus. The tumulus is located in the Nohara Kofun Cluster of Ohara Village, Ōsato County in the Saitama Prefecture. (Ohara Village was renamed to Kōnan Town and is now known as Ōaza Nohara Aza Miyawaki, Kumagaya City).

The sculptures are well known among the haniwa from the Kofun period (250-538 CE) for their simplistic design, unique facial expressions, and implied dancing or singing gestures. However, in recent scholarly discussions, the theory that they are not dancing figures but horse keepers holding a rein and pulling a horse has become more prevalent.

== Characteristics ==
Haniwa are commonly representations with a high level of abstraction. However, these two figures were created with an exceptional degree of abstraction. Both are standing statues, with clay sticks for arms, that lack the lower part of the body. Instead, a cylindrical tube with a rounded end for the head is used as a base. With the left arm raised and the right arm extended diagonally downward in front, they look, when viewed from the front, as if both arms are held in an inverted S-shape.

Their mouths and eyes are hollowed in circles of approximately the same size as if they are wide open. These facial expressions are relatively rare for haniwa. They also look as if they are singing while dancing. The constriction of a neck is not expressed, and the bridge of the nose is affixed with a single clay string extended to the forehead, making it a characteristic expression of a human. Clothing is not depicted in detail, either, other than a fastened waist belt.

The smaller haniwa is plastered with clay on both sides of the head. Historically, this is the hairstyle of a low-ranking person known as a peasant style (with buns on each side of the head), and because it is equipped with a tool that appears to be a sickle on the back waist, it is classified as a male farmer. The larger haniwa has no earlobes or hair, except for a small earhole on either side of the head. Because these two figures form a pair, one large and one small, there is a theory that they represent a man and a woman, with the larger one being the woman. There is also a theory that both are male.

In the Special Haniwa Exhibition, where the Dancing Haniwa was first shown to the public, early comments criticized them as "unskillfully made with a bizarre style." They have not been classified as an "important cultural property" unlike other haniwa sculptures. Nevertheless, archaeologist Shuichi Goto later gave the opinion that "there is something to love about the childish craftsmanship." Archeologist Fumio Miki wrote that "although it is unskillfully crafted, you can feel a sense of intimacy in the candid expressions." Japanese art historian Seiroku Noma argues that "at first glance, this kind of expression appears to be at a primitive stage, but it is instead a result of the bold simplification of already partially developed haniwa stylization. This simple and bold portrayal makes it more interesting than a well-crafted haniwa."

== Recent re-interpretation ==
Archaeologist Shuichi Goto identified these two figures as dancing people in 1931. In his paper “The Significance of Haniwa”, Goto classified haniwa according to their clothing, equipment, and posture and analyzed the occupational characteristics of each haniwa. Goto discovered a group of music-playing haniwa exemplified by “A Boy Playing the Koto” and “A Boy Playing the Taiko Drum” excavated from the Kamitakeshi (Gōshi) Tenjinyama Tumulus in Isezaki City, Gunma Prefecture. The two figures excavated from the Nohara burial mound were cited as examples of the corresponding dancing figures and thus were designated as the “Dancing Man and Woman.”

However, since the 1990s, doubts have been raised about the validity of these classification methods. For example, in the case of Dancing Haniwa, Goto regarded the act of raising one arm as dancing in comparison with other haniwa playing instruments, but this is made without concrete evidence. Yoshimichi Tsukada claims that it is more reasonable to consider the Dancing Haniwa to be horse herders because their characteristic attributes such as “raising one arm,” “equipped with a sickle on the waist band,” “represented only from waist and above,” and “having a hairstyle apportioned on both sides of the head” are elements widely shared with horse keeper haniwa, which depict horse pulling with one arm raised and holding a rein. Furthermore, haniwa often depict breasts to distinguish women, which the larger figure of the Dancing Haniwa does not have. Therefore, Tsukada argues that both figures should be considered to be male herders, rejecting the earlier interpretation of them as dancers.
