= Haniwa =

Ancient Japanese clay burial figures

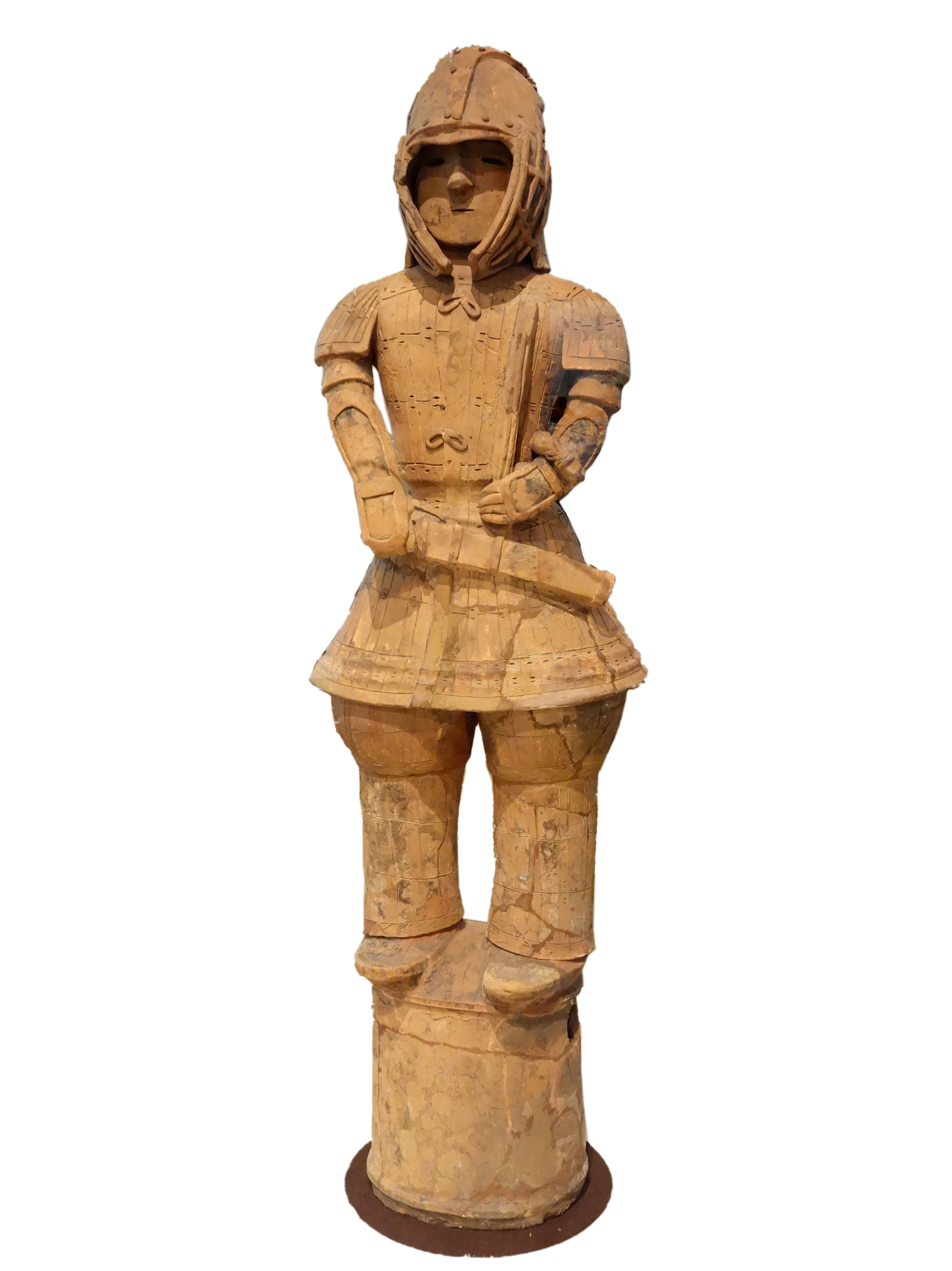
Haniwa warrior in keikō type armor, Ōta, Gunma Prefecture, c. 6th century AD. Height: 131.5 centimetres (51.8 in). National Treasure of Japan

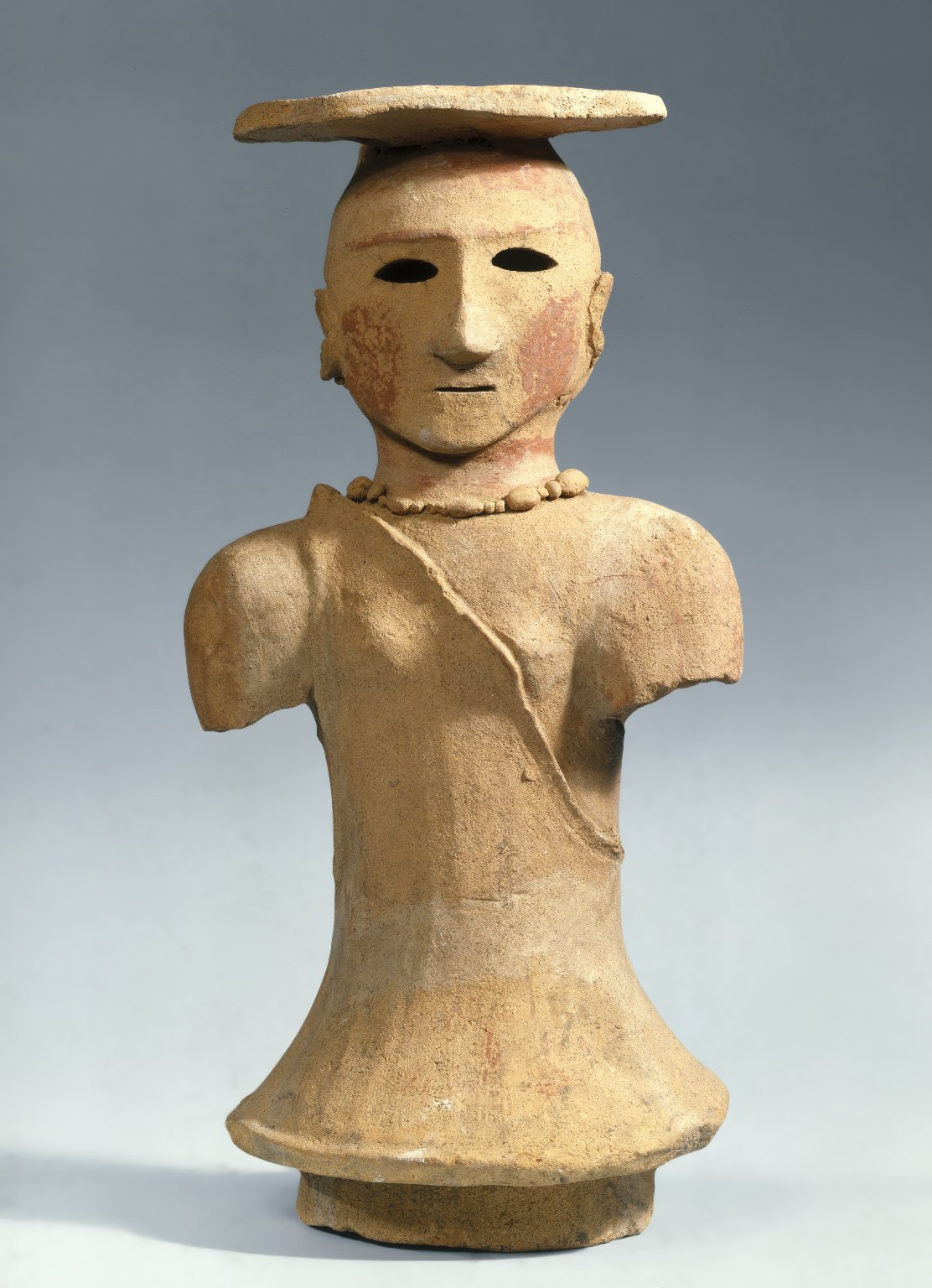
Haniwa figure of a woman, 5th–6th century. Earthenware. Excavation point unknown. This figure is considered to represent a high-ranking woman, possibly a shaman or priestess. The figure is fragmentary: the arms are missing and, like many extant haniwa, it has been reassembled from shards.

Haniwa (埴輪) are terracotta clay figures that were made for ritual use and buried with the dead as funerary objects during the Kofun period (3rd to 6th centuries AD) of the history of Japan. Haniwa were created using the wazumi technique, in which mounds of coiled clay were built up to shape the figure, layer by layer. The word haniwa can also refer to offering cylinders rather than the clay sculptures on top of them, as well as the "wooden haniwa" found in Kofun tumuli.

Terracotta haniwa were made with water-based clay and dried into a coarse and absorbent material that stood the test of time. Their name means "clay circle", referring to how they were arranged in circles above tombs. Protruding parts of the figures were made separately and then attached. Etchings were carved into the figures, after which they were smoothed out with a wooden paddle. Terraces were arranged to place them, with cylindrical bases, into the ground, where the earth would hold them in place.

During the Kofun period, a highly aristocratic society with militaristic rulers developed. The cavalry wore iron armor, carried swords and other weapons, and used advanced military methods like those of northeast Asia. Many of them are represented in haniwa figurines for funerary purposes.

The most important of the haniwa were found in southern Honshū—especially the Kinai region around Nara—and northern Kyūshū. Haniwa grave offerings were made in many forms, such as horses, chickens, birds, fans, fish, houses, weapons, shields, sunshades, pillows, and humans. Besides decorative and spiritual reasons of protecting the deceased in the afterlife, these figures served as a sort of retaining wall for the burial mound.

Because these haniwa display the contemporary clothing, hairstyle, farming tools, and architecture, these sculptures are important as a historical archive of the Kofun period.

Everyday pottery items from the period are called Haji pottery.

== History ==
=== Origin ===
Earlier, clay figurines, called dogū, appeared during the Jōmon period.

Hiroaki Sato cites a passage from the Nihon Shoki, in which Emperor Suinin issued an imperial edict concerning funerals: "From now on make it a rule to erect clay figures and not to hurt people." It was therefore thought that these clay figures may have replaced live human sacrifices. However, haniwa figures were not made until long after Suinin's rule had ended.

The origin of haniwa started during the latter part of the Yayoi period around the Kingdom of Kibi. During this time special earthenware figurines and bowls started to appear on top of the tombs of leaders. The early sculptures exceeded 1 m (3.3 ft) in length. They consisted of a cylindrical portion, which represented the torso, and a skirt-shaped portion at the base, which represented the legs. Many times a special insignia or pattern would be displayed on the torso. Sometimes an obi would be placed around the torso. These sculptures are thought to have been used as part of a funeral ritual. Other than the Kibi area, the only other place these sculptures were found was in the Izumo province.

During the latter part of the third century, these sculptures started to appear on top of the imperial grave mounds in the Kinai region. During this time more elaborate haniwa appeared with earthenware bowls. It is believed that the movement of these sculptures and haniwa from the Kibi region to the Kinai region is indicative of an increase in their importance.

=== Later developments ===
During the earlier part of the Kofun period (later 3rd century CE) the only earthenware haniwa were cylindrical, like barrels. These haniwa barrels were used to form the kofun mound. They were arranged in the shape of the mound (square, circle, or keyhole) and soil was brought in to fill the interior, and then a new row of haniwa barrels was arranged to make the next level and the process was repeated until the mound was the desired height. Additional soil was added to the exterior to form sloping sides.

Toward the early 4th century CE, haniwa sculptures in the shape of shields and other tools started to appear. By the middle Kofun period (mid-5th century AD), there were haniwa statues in the shape of shrine maidens, horses, dogs, and other animals. As the practice of ceremonial burial mounds declined in the mid-6th century CE, haniwa became rarer in the Kinai region; however, haniwa were made in abundance in the Kantō region.

It is not uncommon for some haniwa to be painted with red dye or other colors. Besides the cylindrical haniwa (enkei-haniwa), another common type was the house-shaped haniwa (keisho-haniwa). Other things that fell into the category of keisho-haniwa were those shaped like humans, animals, and swords. The details on the haniwa give information about the elite buried in the tomb, and represent some of the tools or other objects people of that time used. The military haniwa inform archeologists of the armour and weapons, as well as the status symbols of the military class.

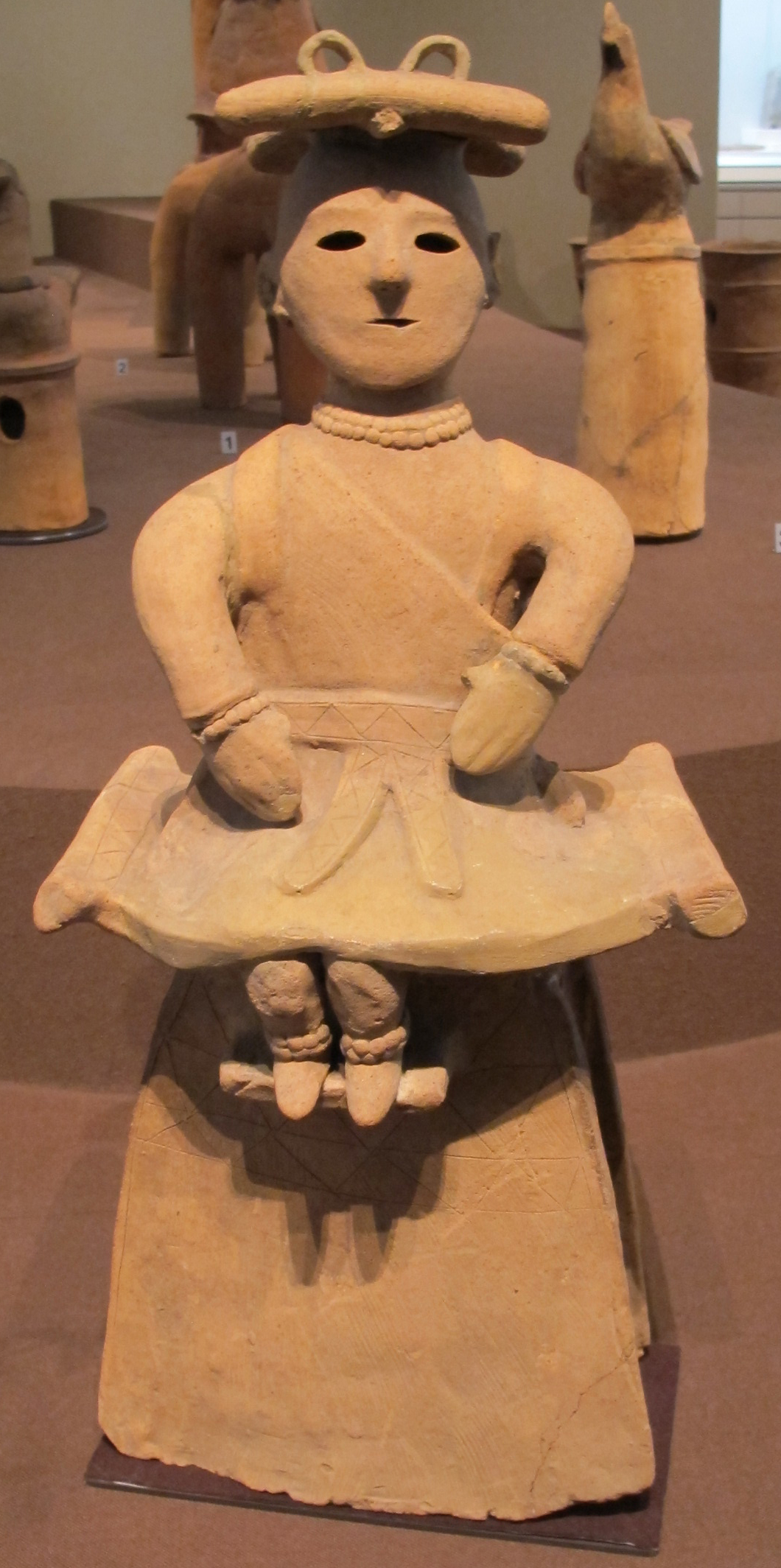
Seated woman

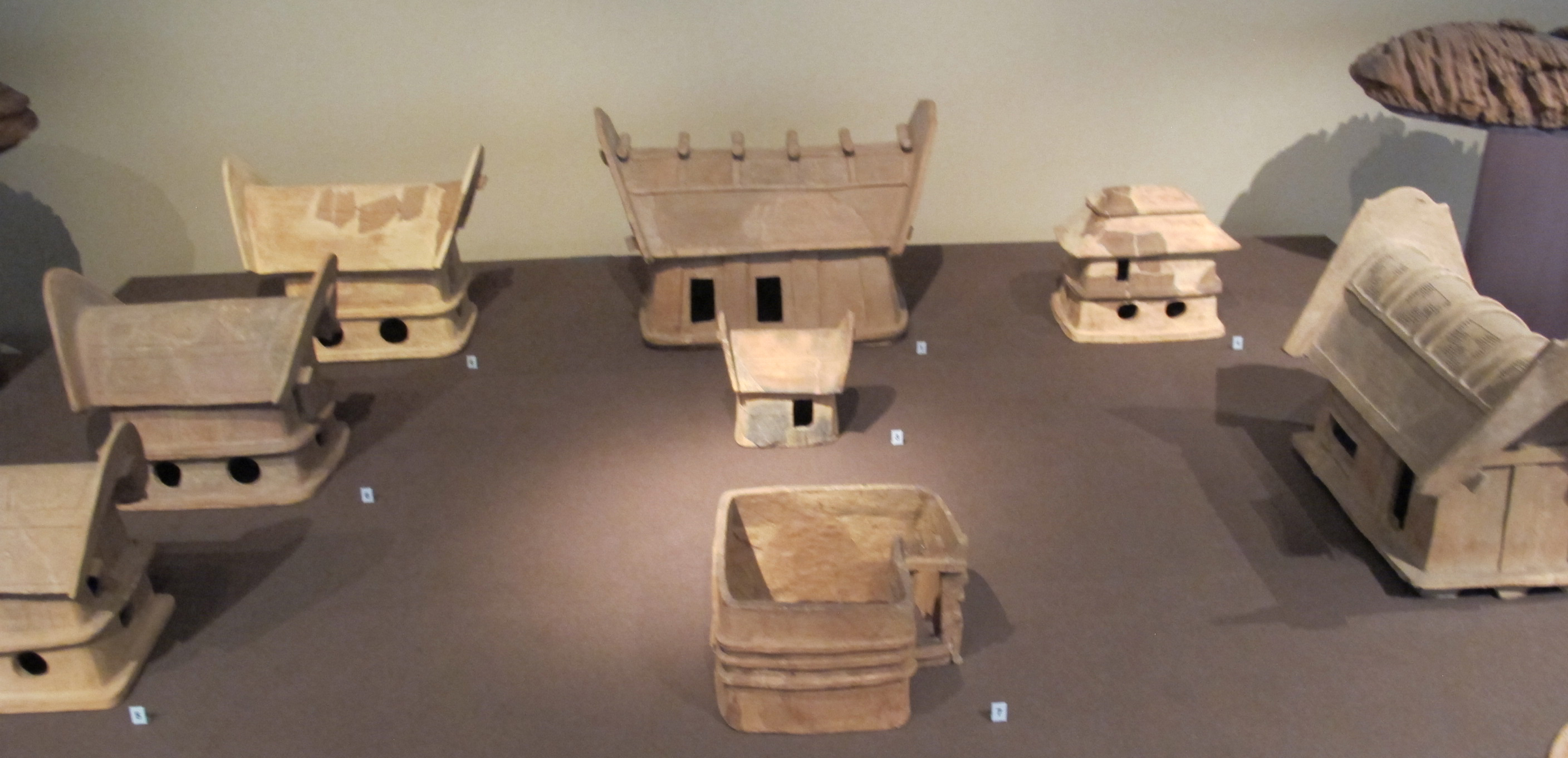
Haniwa houses

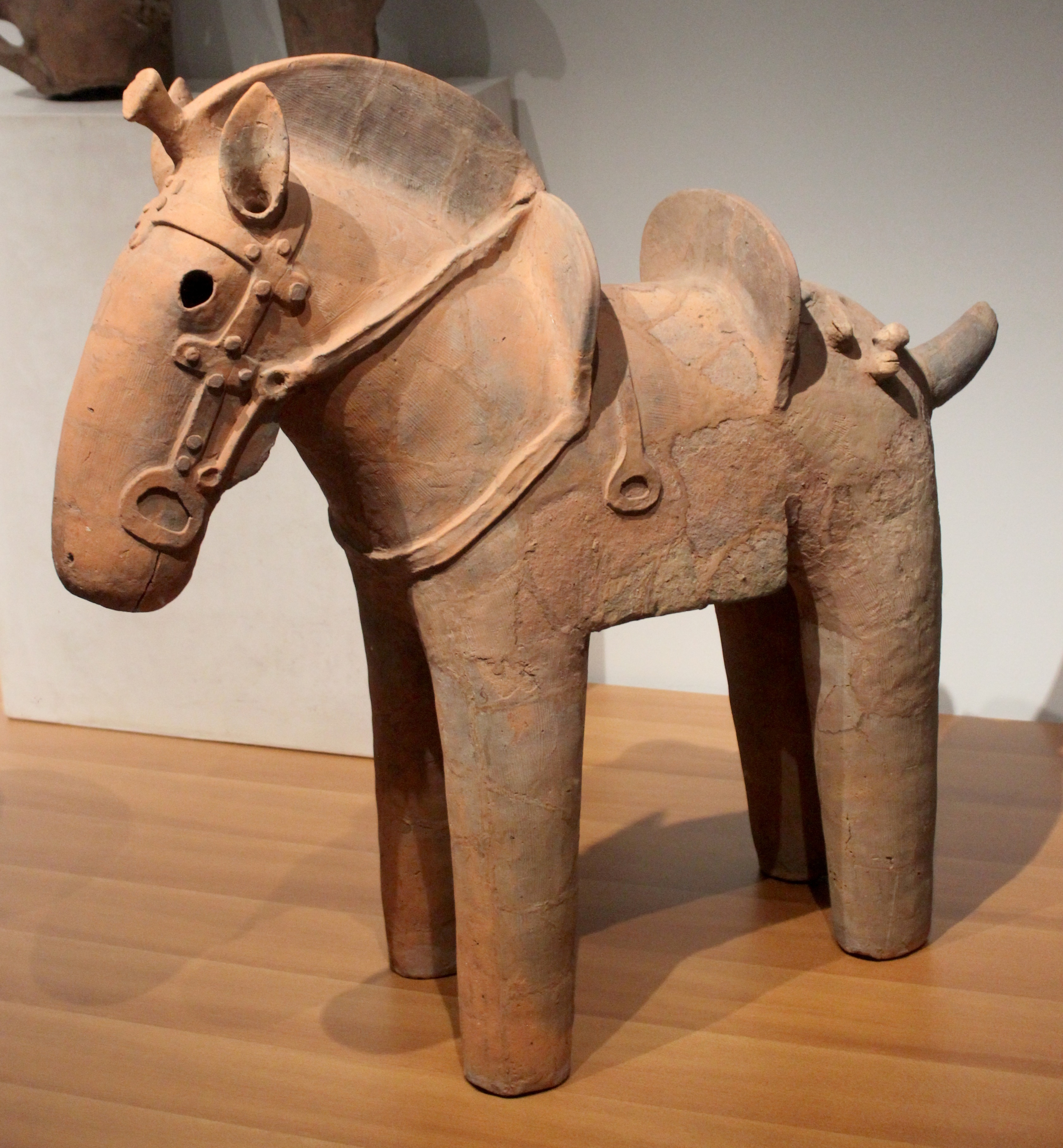
Haniwa horse statuette, complete with saddle and stirrups, 6th century

== Significance ==
Originally, the cylindrical type haniwa were set on top of the funeral mounds, so it is believed that they had a purpose in funeral rituals; however, as the haniwa became more developed, they were set toward the outside of the grave area. It is thought that they were used as boundary markers for the borders of the gravesite.

There is a theory that the soul of the deceased would reside in the haniwa, as the earlier haniwa were placed on top of the funeral mounds. There are haniwa that are equipped with weapons and armor. These are thought to be containers for souls. The armor and weapons would drive away evil spirits and protect the buried ruler from calamity. Because the horse- and animal-shaped haniwa were normally neatly arranged into a line, it is believed that they were part of a sending-off ceremony.

== In modern society ==
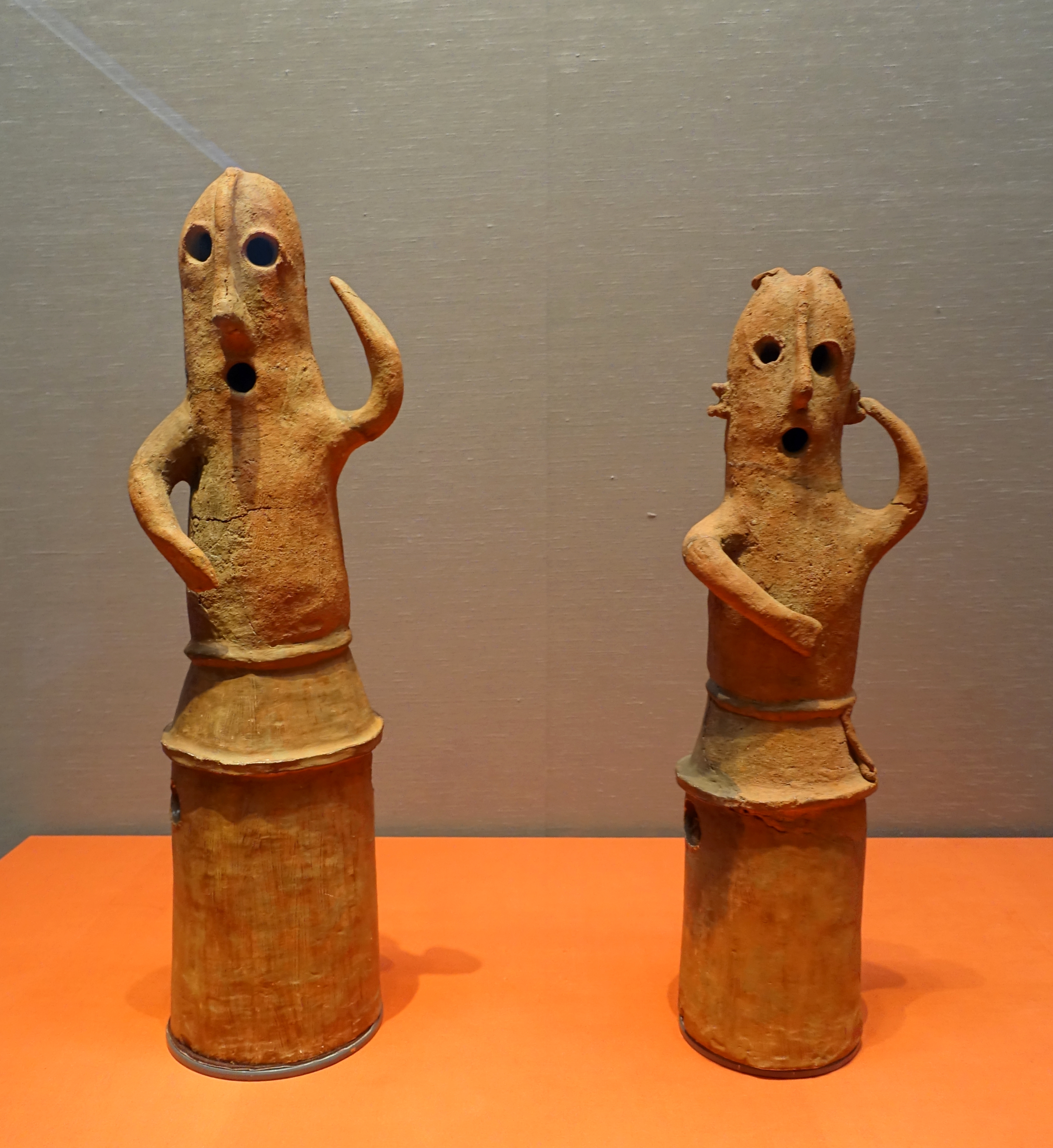
Haniwa excavated from Nohara Tumulus, Kumagaya-shi, Saitama, Kofun period, 500s AD, ceramic. Tokyo National Museum

Although the religious implications of the haniwa have largely declined in modern society, the sculptures are prized by many for their aesthetic and historical significance. The works of Isamu Noguchi, for example, were heavily influenced by the haniwa. They have been accepted as "Pure Art", according to Time magazine. Beyond simple appreciation as artistic sculptures, modern popular culture has, in some cases, portrayed the haniwa as containing a sentient entity and not just as a simple empty sculpture.

The portrayal of living haniwa has—since the late 1990s—become widespread, being featured in entertainment media, including but not limited to: video games, trading cards, movies, and television. In some of the depictions, the haniwa is primarily presented as a ghostlike, malevolent creature with no emotional remorse to complete its task. The most common portrayal depicts the haniwa with a rounded, pot-like shape, bearing two deep eyes, a wide mouth, and two featureless "arms" on opposite sides of the "pot". Gyroids in the Animal Crossing video game series are based on haniwa, and, indeed, are so called in the game's original Japanese versions.

== See also ==
- Ancient Egyptian funerary practices
- Cult image, also known as an idol
- Dogū
- Haniwa Terracotta Dancers
- Hōko (doll)
- Mozu Tombs
- Terracotta Army, of ancient China
- Ushabti, ancient Egyptian burial sculpture
- Zuijin
