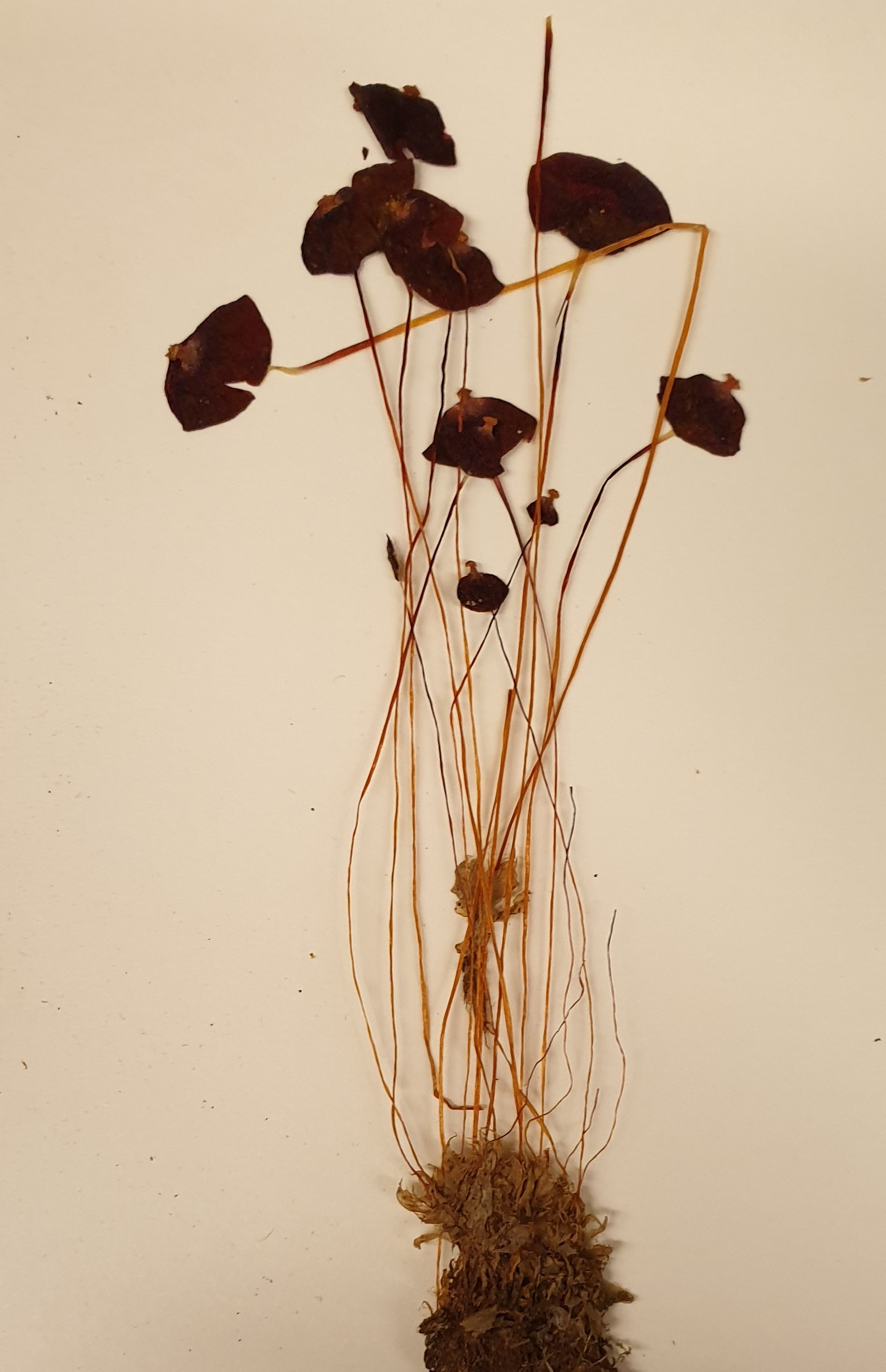
- Dried herbarium sample of S. rubrum, with the distinctive flower-like sporophyte

Scientific classification
- Kingdom: Plantae
- Division: Bryophyta
- Class: Bryopsida
- Subclass: Bryidae
- Order: Splachnales
- Family: Splachnaceae
- Genus: Splachnum
- Species: S. rubrum

Binomial name
- Splachnum rubrum Hedw.

= Splachnum rubrum =

Species of moss in the family Splachnaceae

Splachnum rubrum (also known as red dung moss, brilliant red dung moss or red parasol moss), is a species of moss in the Splachnum genus which is found in the Northern Hemisphere. Like other species in the Splachnum genus, it is known for growing on animal waste and being entomophilous. Although very rare, its bright red-purple sporangia makes its sporophyte stage stand out well when seen in the wild.

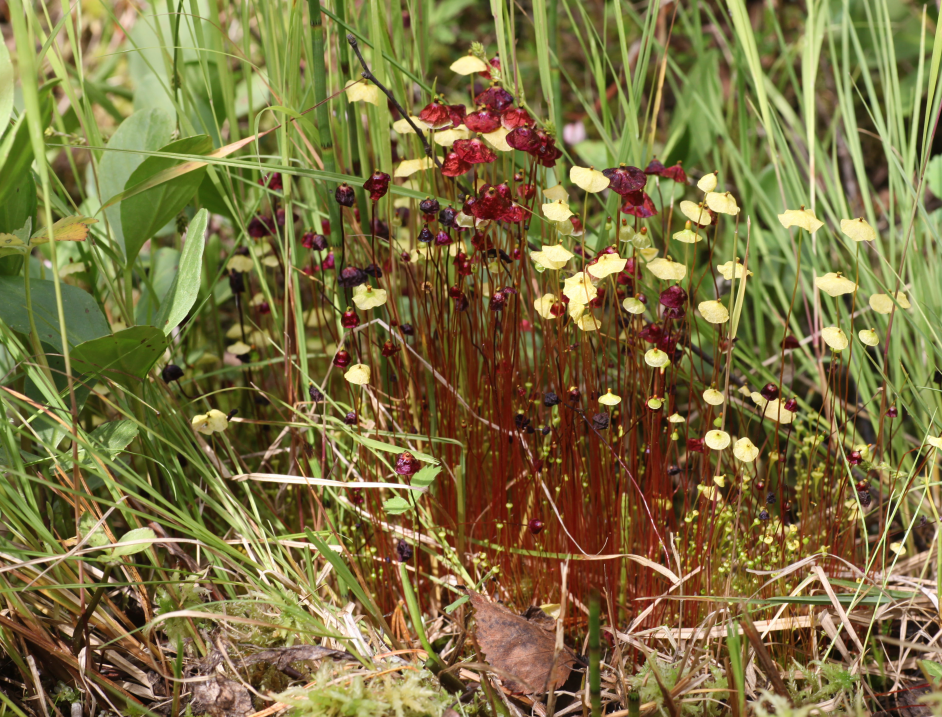
Live S. rubrum with mature sporophytes.

== Description ==
The plant forms tufts of varying density on herbivore dung. The gametophyte is green to yellow-green, with leaves that accumulate at the apex of the stem, which is usually between 1.5 and 3.0 cm long. The leaves are 5–7.5 mm long and obovate or acuminated, with a costa disappearing in the apical lamina. The leaf margins are coarsely toothed.

The sporophyte is the most conspicuous part of the plant and due to its shape and colors mistaken for an angiosperm flower. The capsule has an orange-brown capsule with a bright magenta hypophysis, shaped like an umbrella. It rests on a long (5–13 cm), straight, orange-red seta.

Splachnum rubrum obtains the distinctive habitus in summer, when the sporangium matures. In spring, the immature sporophytes may be confused with the mature sporophytes of S. sphaericum or the immature sporophytes of S. ampullaceum. When mature, S. rubrum is easily distinguished from S. luteum by its color.

== Distribution ==
Splachnum rubrum is mostly found in swamps and muskeg. It is very rare; of all Splachnum species in North America it is by far the least common. On this continent, it can be found in the boreal regions of Canada stretching from Newfoundland and Labrador to northern British Columbia and Alaska. Some specimens have been observed in the Midwestern United States. In Eurasia it is found in Northern Europe, Estonia and Siberia

It is classified imperiled (S2) in Ontario and Alberta and critically imperiled (S1) in Minnesota and Nova Scotia.

== Ecology ==
Splachnum rubrum grows only on the dung of large herbivores, mainly that of moose, and cattle in Europe. In North America S. rubrum is likely absent outside of the native moose range. The decline of the distribution of moose may therefore further imperil S. rubrum.

Splachnum rubrum is an entomophilous species, which means it disperses its spores using insects. Dipterans are attracted by the dung on which the moss grows, because they find mates here and use it as an oviposition site. Upon landing on the dung the fly contacts the mature capsules, which causes spores to attach to its body; it then carries these to the next patch with dung, thereby facilitating dispersal. Flies from the genera Scathophagaidae, Delia, Myospila and Pyrellia are the main dispersers, as they reproduce in early summer when the sporophytes mature.
