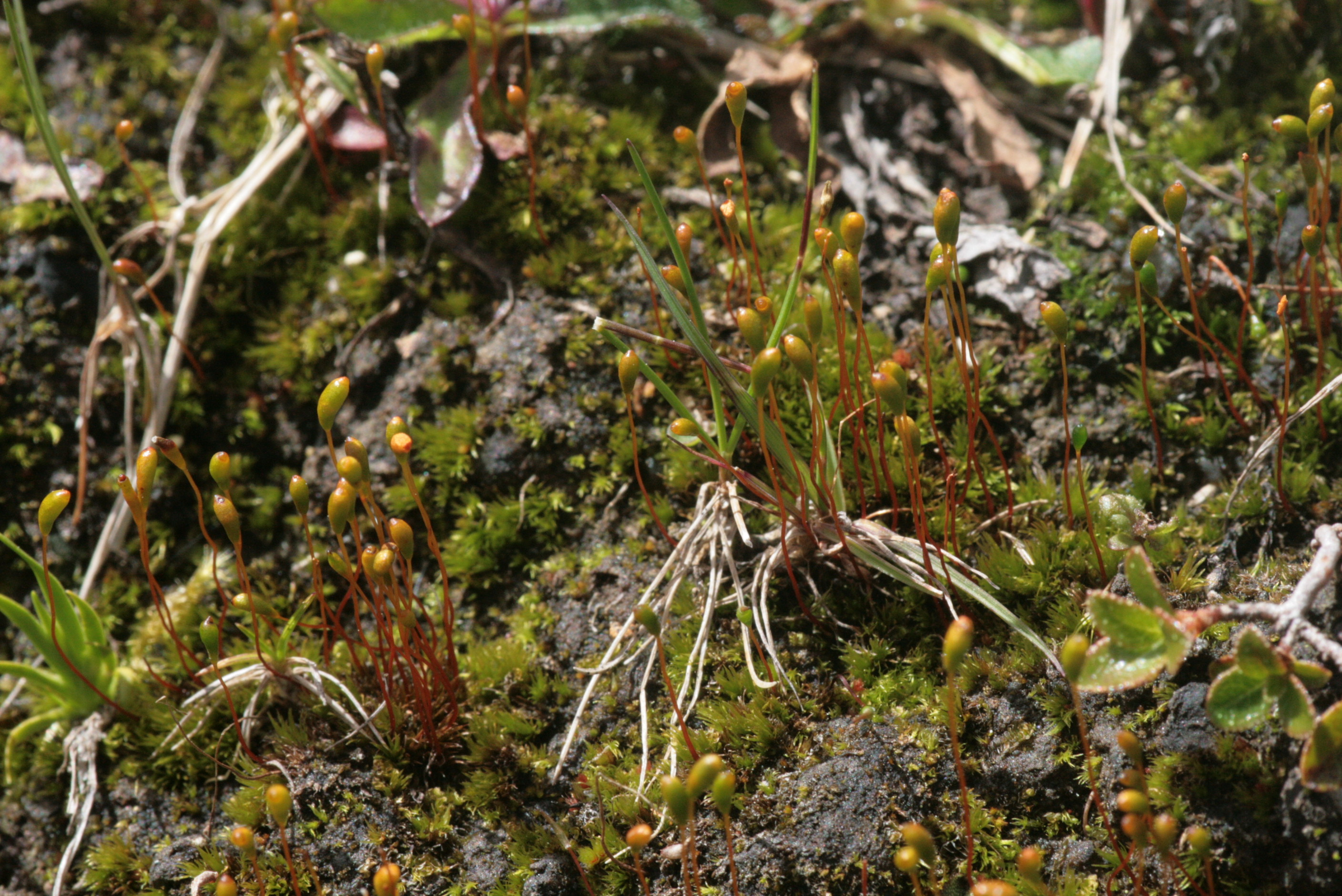

Conservation status
- Apparently Secure (NatureServe)

Scientific classification
- Kingdom: Plantae
- Division: Bryophyta
- Class: Bryopsida
- Subclass: Bryidae
- Order: Splachnales
- Family: Meesiaceae
- Genus: Meesia
- Species: M. uliginosa

Binomial name
- Meesia uliginosa Hedw.

= Meesia uliginosa =

Broad-nerved hump-moss

Species of moss

Meesia uliginosa, the broad-nerved hump-moss, is a rare moss of the Western U.S. It occurs all around the Northern Hemisphere in higher latitudes, and in some places is not as rare as in the Western U.S.

== Technical description ==
Plant autoicous, but many plants with only antheridia or archegonia; plants often fertile. Stems 1–4 cm long, often branched, sans hyaloderm. Basal cells of persistent axillary hairs numerous, strongly reddened. Leaves erect, linear to ligulate-lingulate, never squarrose-recurved, somewhat contorted when dry, smaller at base of stem than larger above, .75–4.5 mm long; margins entire, revolute (i.e., strongly recurved); costa strong, broad (1/3 to 2/3 width of leaf base), ends near leaf apex; apex blunt, obtuse to rounded. Seta very long (1.5–10 cm). Capsule pyriform, asymmetrical, curved, up to 4 mm long including neck; neck long, often wrinkled when dry; endostome of 16 segments open on the keel, sometimes with evidence of cilia; outer peristome shorter than the inner. Spores finely papillose.

== Distribution, habitat, and ecology ==
This species has a bipolar distribution, meaning that it exists in both hemispheres. In the Northern Hemisphere, it is circumboreal, being found in Greenland, Canada, the northern United States, the Baltic, Russia, and Mongolia. It is also known from South America and nearby places in Antarctica.

This moss lives in fens, peaty soil banks, seeps, meadows, and rock fissures upon exposed, damp organic soil within upper montane to subalpine coniferous forest. More specifically, it prefers to live upon calcareous substrates, usually in alpine or arctic regions, but occurring also in rich fens at lower elevations. Its elevational range is from 3,950 to 8,550 ft (1,200 to 2,610 m).

The fire ecology of this plant is not known; however, fens rarely burn. Excess soot from a nearby fire, however, might negatively affect habitat quality. Fire return intervals in conifer bogs, a somewhat similar mire-type habitat, are estimated to be about once every 150–200 years. Fire does significant damage to peat, but the bog must be dry (as during a drought year) in order to burn; typically, bogs are not dry enough.

== Conservation status and threats ==
U.S. Forest Service Pacific Southwest Region Sensitive Species.

California Native Plant Society List 2.2

NatureServe California State Rank: S2.2; Global Rank: G4

Fens are delicate habitats susceptible to impacts from livestock grazing, hydrologic alteration, construction and continued use of roads, and peat mining. Rich fen habitats are especially susceptible to modification. The surface water chemistry of rich fens is sensitive to climatic and anthropogenic influences.

== Field identification ==
Meesia uliginosa may be distinguished from M. triquetra by its lack of tristichous growth habit, relatively wide costa, entire and revolute leaf margins, blunt leaf apex, and autoicous sexual condition.
