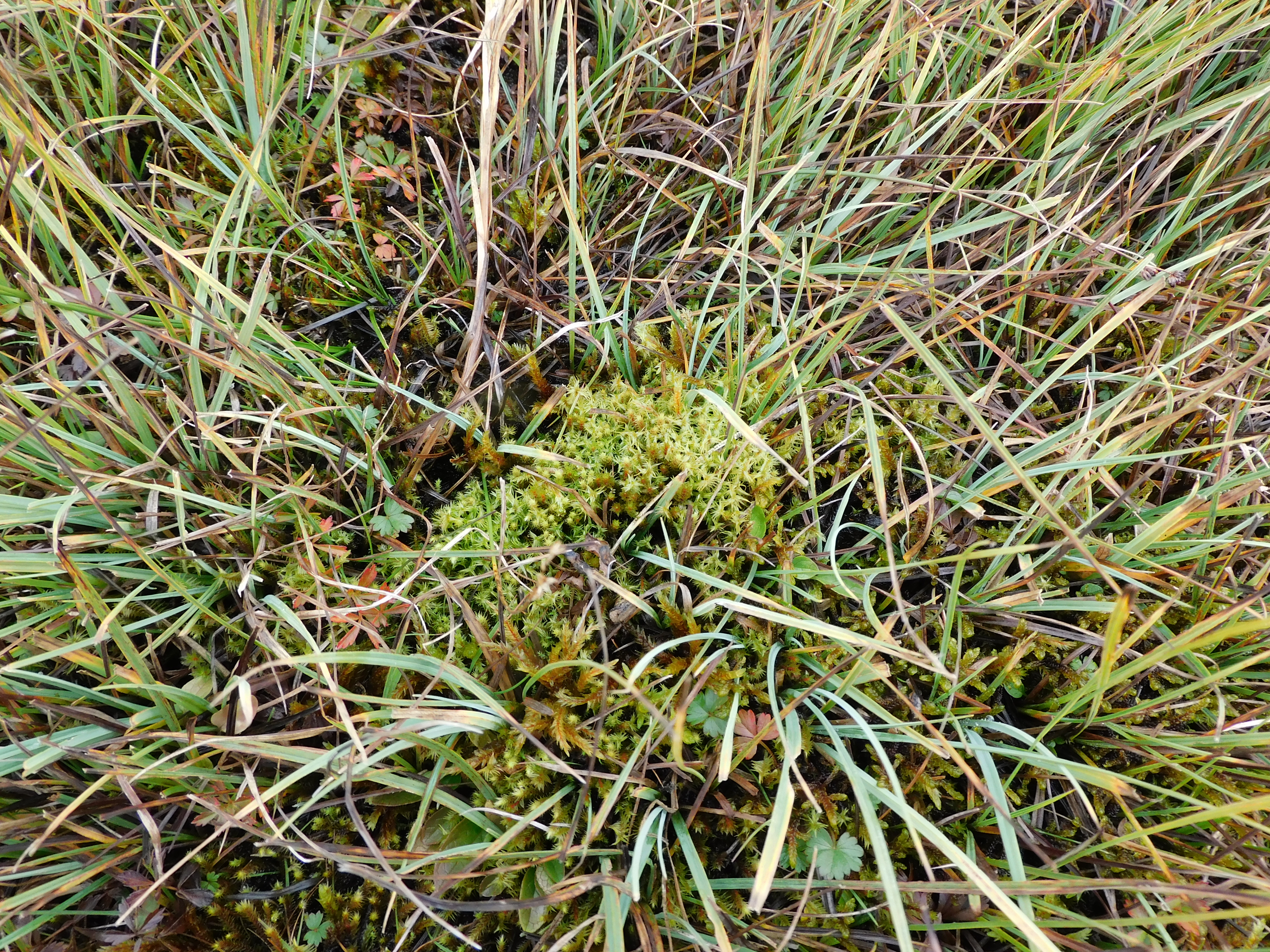

Scientific classification
- Kingdom: Plantae
- Division: Bryophyta
- Class: Bryopsida
- Subclass: Bryidae
- Order: Splachnales
- Family: Meesiaceae
- Genus: Meesia; Hedw.

= Meesia =

Genus of mosses

Meesia is a genus of mosses belonging to the family Meesiaceae. The genus has cosmopolitan distribution.

The genus name of Meesia is in honour of David Meese (1723–1770), who was a Dutch botanist, notable for his authorship of the Flora frisica in 1760.

The genus was first described by Johann Hedwig in 1801.

== Species ==
As accepted by GBIF;

- Meesia hexasticha (Funck) Bruch
- Meesia lavardei Thér.
- Meesia longiseta Hedwig, 1801
- Meesia muelleri Müll. Hal. & Hampe
- Meesia novae-zealandia Dixon & Sainsbury
- Meesia squarrosa (Hedw.) Wahlenb.
- Meesia stygia (Sw.) Brid.
- Meesia triquetra (Richt.) Ångstr.
- Meesia ulei Müll. Hal.
- Meesia uliginosa Hedw.
- Meesia vagans (Hook. & Wilson) Müll. Hal.
