= Tayloria acuminata =

Scientific classification
- Kingdom: Plantae
- Division: Bryophyta
- Class: Bryopsida
- Subclass: Bryidae
- Order: Splachnales
- Family: Splachnaceae
- Genus: Tayloria
- Species: T. acuminata

Binomial name
- Tayloria acuminata Hornsch.

Synonyms
- Georgia cuspidata Kindb. Hookeria acuminata Schleich; Tayloria splachnoides var. acuminata (Hornsch.) Hüb., Deutschl. Laubm.

Species of moss

Tayloria acuminata, commonly known as acuminate dung moss and acuminate trumpet moss, is a bright-green dung moss species with violet radicles that age to a dark red. It is native to North America and Iceland, where it is found in bird cliffs in Hornstrandir. In Iceland it has the conservation status of a vulnerable species (VU).
