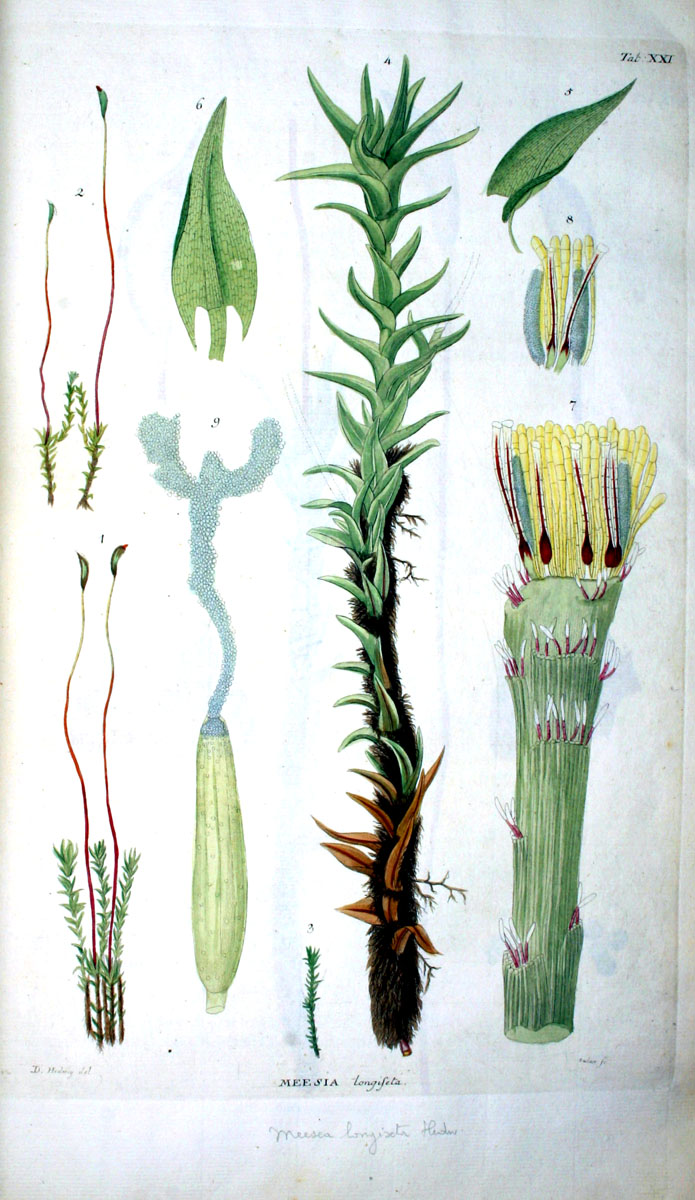

Scientific classification
- Kingdom: Plantae
- Division: Bryophyta
- Class: Bryopsida
- Subclass: Bryidae
- Order: Splachnales
- Family: Meesiaceae
- Genus: Meesia
- Species: M. longiseta

Binomial name
- Meesia longiseta Hedwig, 1801

= Meesia longiseta =

Species of moss

Meesia longiseta is a species of moss belonging to the family Meesiaceae.

It is native to Europe and America.
