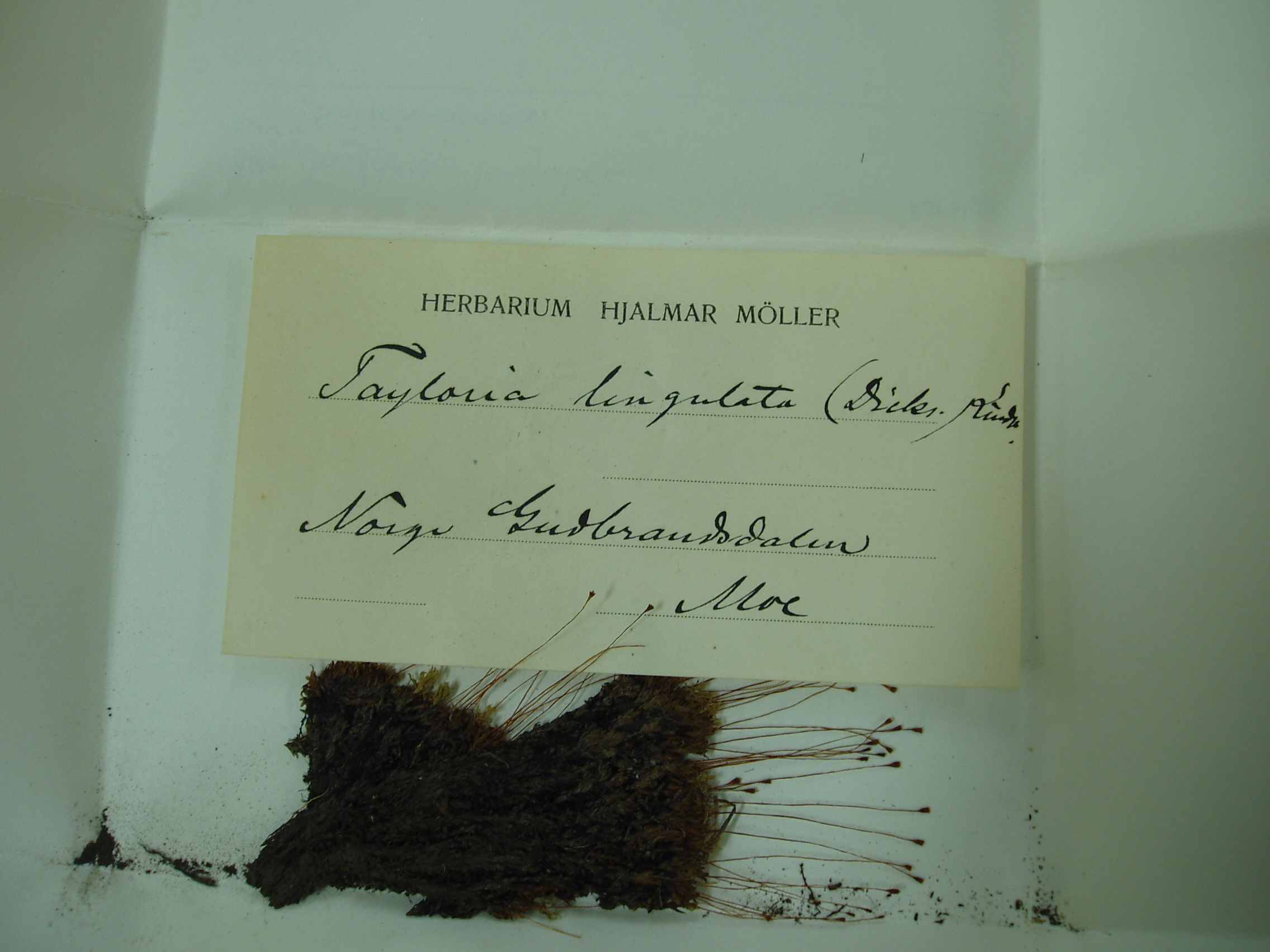

Scientific classification
- Kingdom: Plantae
- Division: Bryophyta
- Class: Bryopsida
- Subclass: Bryidae
- Order: Splachnales
- Family: Splachnaceae
- Genus: Tayloria
- Species: T. lingulata

Binomial name
- Tayloria lingulata (Dicks.) Lindb.

= Tayloria lingulata =

Species of moss

Tayloria lingulata, commonly known as lingulate dung moss, tongue-leaved gland-moss, or marsh collar-moss, is a moss found in montane habitats in the Northern Hemisphere including Europe, Asia and North America.

In the United Kingdom, it occurs only in Scotland where it has been found on Ben Lawers and Ben Lomond.
