= Amblyodon dealbatus =

Scientific classification
- Kingdom: Plantae
- Division: Bryophyta
- Class: Bryopsida
- Subclass: Bryidae
- Order: Splachnales
- Family: Meesiaceae
- Genus: Amblyodon
- Species: A. dealbatus

Binomial name
- Amblyodon dealbatus (Sw. ex Hedw.) Bruch & Schimp.

Species of moss

Amblyodon dealbatus, short-tooth hump-moss, is a species of mosses belonging to the family Meesiaceae.

It is native to Europe and Northern America.
