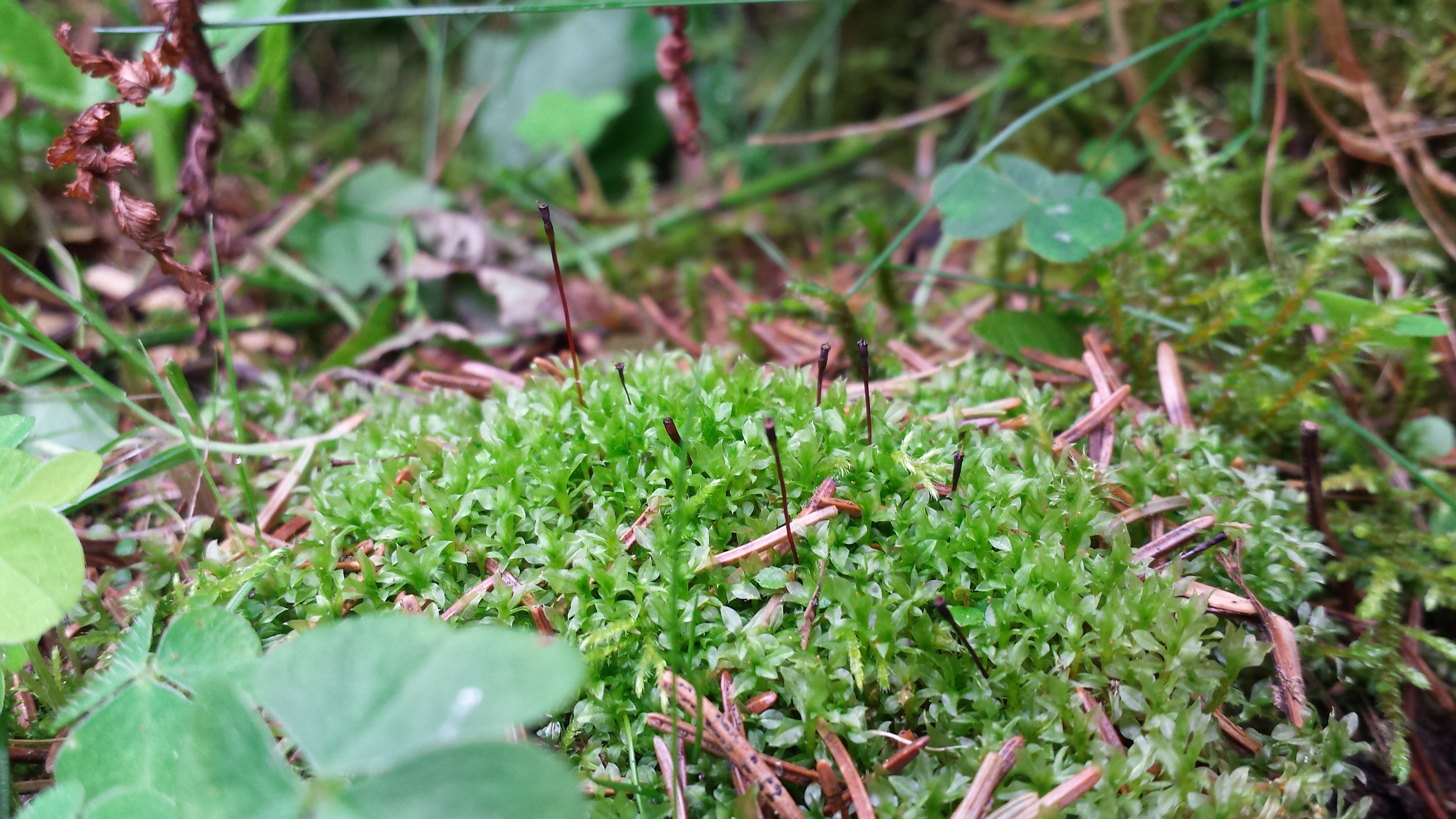

Scientific classification
- Kingdom: Plantae
- Division: Bryophyta
- Class: Bryopsida
- Subclass: Bryidae
- Order: Splachnales
- Family: Splachnaceae
- Genus: Tayloria
- Species: T. tenuis

Binomial name
- Tayloria tenuis (Dicks.) Schimp.

= Tayloria tenuis =

Species of moss

Tayloria tenuis is a species of moss belonging to the family Splachnaceae.

It is native to Europe and Northern America.
