= Papal mint =

The Papal Mint is the pope's institute for the production of hard cash. Papal Mint also refers to the buildings in Avignon, Rome, and elsewhere that used to house the mint.

== History of Papal coin ==
Coins survive from the tenures of Pope Zacharias (741-752), of Gregory III (731-741) (Ficoroni, "Museo Kircheriano"), and possibly of Gregory II (715-731). These pieces, two of which are of silver, are believed to be true coins, and not medals like those distributed as "presbyterium" at the coronation of the popes since the time of Valentine (827). Their stamp resembles the Byzantine and Merovingian coins of the seventh and eighth centuries, and their square shape is also found in Byzantine pieces. Those that bear the inscription GREII PAPE — SCI PTR (Gregorii Papæ — Sancti Petri) cannot be attributed to Pope Gregory IV (827-44), because of the peculiarity of minting. The existence of these coins, while the popes yet recognized the Byzantine domination, is explained by Ludo Moritz Hartmann, who believes that, in the eighth century, the popes received from the emperors the attributes of "Præfectus Urbis". Under the empire, coins that were struck in the provinces bore the name of some local magistrate; Hartmann argues that the coins of Gregory and of Zacharias are simply imperial Byzantine pieces, bearing the name of the first civil magistrate of the City of Rome.

There are no coins of pope Stephen III or of pope Paul I, who reigned when the Duchy of Rome was already independent of the Eastern Empire; the first true papal coins are those of Adrian I, from whose time until the reign of pope John XIV (984) the popes coined money at Rome.

There is no pontifical money of a date between 984 and 1305; this is explained, in part, by the fact that the Senate of Rome, which sought to replace the papacy in the temporal government of the city, took over the mint in 1143. On the other hand, Prince Alberic had already coined money in his own name. The coins of the Senate of Rome usually bear the inscription "ROMA CAPUT MUNDI", or, S. P. Q. R., or both, with or without emblems. In 1188 the mint was restored to pope Clement III, with the agreement that half of its profits should be assigned to the sindaco, or mayor. The Senate, meanwhile, continued to coin money, and there is no reference on the coins of that time to the papal authority. In the thirteenth century the Sindaco caused his own name to be stamped upon the coins, and, consequently, coins survive with the names of Brancaleone, of Charles I of Anjou, of Francesco Anguillara, viceroy of Robert of Naples, etc.; so did King Ladislao. Cola di Rienzi, during his brief tribunate, likewise struck coins, with the inscription: N. TRIBUN. AUGUST.: ROMA CAPU. MU.

Papal coins reappeared with the removal of the pontifical Court to Avignon, although there exists a single coin that is referred to Benedict XI (1303-4), with the legend COITAT. VENASIN; as, however, this pope never resided in Venaissin, which had belonged to the Holy See since 1274, the coin should be referred to Benedict XII. There are coins of all the popes from John XXII to Pius IX.

== History of the Papal mint ==
The popes, and also the Senate when it coined money, appear to have used the imperial mint of Rome, which was on the slope of the Campidoglio, not far from the Arch of Septimius Severus; but in the fifteenth century the mint was near the bank of Santo Spirito. Finally, in 1665, Alexander VII moved it to the rear of the apse of St. Peter's. Bernini invented for it a machine to do the work more rapidly, and Francesco Girardini furnished a very sensitive balance; so that the mint of Rome was technically the most perfect one of those times. In 1845 Pius IX equipped it with the most modern appliances.

The administration of the mint was at first entrusted to the Camerlengo of the Holy Roman Church; direct supervision, however, was exercised by the senate, from the time at least when that body took possession of the mint, until the reign of Pope Martin V. The sindaco and the conservators of the Camera Capitolina appointed the masters of the mint, while the minting was witnessed by the heads of the guild of goldsmiths and silversmiths. In 1322 John XXII created the office of treasurer for the mint of Avignon, and its incumbent, little by little, made himself independent of the Camerlengo. Later, the office of prelate president of the mint was created. According to Lunadori (Relaz. della Corte di Roma, 1646), the establishments for the coining of money were in charge of a congregation of Cardinals.

The Papal States joined the Latin Monetary Union in 1866.

=== Since Italian unification ===
With the unification of Italy and the altered status of Rome, the Italian government took over the operation of the Papal mint in September 1870. The mint was used to make Italian coins, and due to the presence of Italian soldiers guarding the mint, a tunnel was constructed beneath the Apostolic Palace to ensure private access to the Vatican gardens.

The Italian government announced in 1901 that it was moving its minting operations to a larger facility. Pope Leo XIII, concerned that an anti-papal organization would take up residence in the building, privately arranged to buy it from the Giolitti government via Ernesto Pacelli in 1904.

Vatican City was established as a separate state in 1929. The Italian mint makes coins for the micro-state, which issues its own euros.

== The various Papal mints ==
Rome was not the only city of the Pontifical States that had a mint: prior to the year 1000, there existed at Ravenna the former imperial mint, which was ceded in 996 to Archbishop Gerberto by Gregory V; there were mints also at Spoleto and at Benevento, former residences of Lombard dukes. The Archbishop of Ravenna, who was a feudatory of the emperor rather than of the pope, coined money as long as his temporal power over that city and its territory lasted. The mint of the Emperor Henry VI was established at Bologna in 1194, and nearly all of the coins struck there bear the motto BONONIA DOCET, or BONONIA MATER STUDIORUM. The baiocchi of Bologna were called bolognini; the gold bolognino was equivalent to a gold sequin. The lira, also a Bolognese coin, was worth 20 bolognini. These coins were struck in the name of the commune; it is only from the time when Bologna was recovered by the Holy See, under Clement VI, that Bolognese coins may be regarded as papal.

=== Papal mints granted by status or privilege ===
Other cities had mints because they were the capitals of principalities subject to the Holy See, or in virtue of a privilege granted them by some prince; and when these feudal states fell to the Holy See, they retained the mints as papal establishments. This was so in the case of Camerino (from Leo X to Paul III), Urbino, Pesaro and Gubbio (under Julius II, Leo X and Clement XI), Ferrara (from Clement VIII), Parma and Piacenza (from Julius II to Paul III).

=== Papal mints of limited time periods ===
There were other cities or regions to which the popes granted a mint for limited periods of time, as Ancona (from Sixtus IV to Pius VI), Aquila (1486, when that city rebelled against king Ferdinand I of Naples and gave its allegiance to Innocent VIII; its coins, which are very rare, bear the inscription AQUILANA LIBERTAS), Ascoli (from Martin V to Pius VI), Avignon (from Clement V on), Carpentras (under Clement VIII), Venaissin (near Avignon; from Boniface VIII), Fabriano (under Leo X), Fano (from Innocent VIII to Clement VIII), Fermo (from Boniface IX, 1390, to Leo X), the Marches (around Ancona; from Boniface IX to Gregory XIII), Macerata (from Boniface IX to Gregory XIV), Modena (under Leo X and Clement VII), Montalto (under Sixtus V), Orvieto (under Julius II), the "Patrimony" (from Benedict XI to Benedict XII), Perugia (from Julius II to Julius III), Ravenna (from Leo X to Paul III and under Benedict XIV), Recanati (under Nicholas V), Reggio (from Julius II to Adrian VI), Spoleto city (under Paul II), the Duchy of Spoleto, PROVINCIÆ DUCATUS (under Paul V), Viterbo (under Urban VI and Sixtus IV).

== The Papal coins ==
Pope Pius VI, being obliged to coin a great deal of copper money, gave the minting of it to a great many cities of the Patrimony of Peter, of Umbria and of the Marches, which, together with those already named, continued to strike these coins; among them were Civitavecchia, Gubbio, Matelica, Ronciglione (the coins of 1799 showing the burning of this city are famous), Terni and Tivoli. Pius VII suppressed all the mints except those of Rome and of Bologna.

As far back as 1370 there were coins struck during the vacancies of the Holy See, by authority of the Camerlengo of the Holy Roman Church, who, after the fifteenth century at least, had his name and his coat of arms be stamped on the reverse of the coin, the obverse bearing the words "SEDE VACANTE" and the date, surrounding the crossed keys surmounted by the pavilion.

=== Marks on the Papal coins ===
All papal coins, with rare exceptions, bear the name of the pope, preceded (until the time of Paul II) by a Greek cross, and nearly all of the more ancient ones bear, either on the obverse or on the reverse, the words S. PETRUS, and some of them, the words S. PAULUS also. From Leo III to the Ottonian dynasty, the coins bear the name of the Holy Roman Emperor as well as that of the pope. After the sixteenth century the coat of arms of the pope alone frequently appears on pontifical coins. There are also found images of the Saviour, or of saints, symbolical figures of men or of animals, the keys (which appear for the first time on the coins of Benevento) etc. From the sixteenth century to the eighteenth, Biblical or moral phrases are added, in allusion to the saint or to the symbol that is stamped upon the coin, e.g. MONSTRA TE ESSE MATREM, SPES NOSTRA, SUB TUUM PRÆSIDIUM, TOTA PULCERA, SUPRA FIRMAM PETRAM, DA RECTA SAPERE (during the Conclave), UBI THESAURUS IBI COR, CRESCENTEM SEQUITUR CURA PECUNIAM, HILAREM DATOREM DILIGIT DEUS, PRO PRETIO ANIMÆ, FERRO NOCENTIUS AURUM, IN SUDORE VULTUS, CONSERVATÆ PEREUNT, TOLLE ET PROIICE, etc. Sometimes allusion is made to an historical event, as the acquisition of Ferrara, or the deliverance of Vienna from the Turks(1683), or to some concession of the pope to his subjects, or to a jubilee year. From the time of Clement X the coins struck at Rome bear a minute representation of the coat of arms of the prelate in charge of the mint, a custom that obtained until 1817. The only instance of a Camerlengo of the Holy Roman Church stamping his coat of arms on the coins during the lifetime of the pope is that of Cardinal Francesco Armellini Pantalassi de' Medici, under Adrian VI, in the case of four grossi.

The mints outside of Rome stamped the coins with the arms of their respective cities, or with those of the cardinal legate, of the vice-legate, or of the governor; thus, Cardinal Scipione Borghese in 1612 struck coins at Avignon with his own name and arms, omitting the name of the pope, an example that was followed a year later by the pro-legate Cardinal Filonardi. The city very often placed the image of its patron saint on its coins. The date came to be stamped on coins that were struck during the vacancies of the Holy See, occasionally at first, and later as a rule; it rarely appears on other coins before 1550; the practice became general in the seventeenth century, the year of the Christian era or that of the pontificate being used; and Gregory XVI established it by law, as also the requirement that each coin should bear upon it an expression of its value. At Bologna as early as the seventeenth century, the value of gold or silver coins was usually indicated with the figures 20, 40, 80, etc., i.e. so many bolognini or baiocchi; at Rome, in the eighteenth century, nearly all the copper coins bore an indication of their value. The rim of papal coins rarely bore an inscription; at most, the monogram of the city in which the coin was struck was stamped upon it. From the sixteenth century, the engravers, also, put their ciphers on the coins; among these engravers may be named Benvenuto Cellini, Francesco Francia, the four Hamerani, Giulio Romano, Cavaliere Lucenti, Andrea Perpenti etc. Until the time of Pius VI, the dies for the mint remained the property of the engravers.

=== Monetary system of Papal coinage ===
The Byzantine monetary system is followed in the papal coinage until the reign of Leo III, after which the system of the Frankish Empire obtains. John XXII adopted the Florentine system, and coined gold forms, but the weight of this coin varied from 22 to 30 carats (4.4 to 6 g), until Gregory XI reduced it to the original 24 carats (4.8 g); but deterioration came again, and then there were two kinds of florins, the papal florin, which maintained the old weight, and the florin di Camera, the two being in the ratio of 69 papal florins = 100 florins di Camera = 1 gold pound = 10 carlini. The ducat was coined in the papal mint from the year 1432; it was a coin of Venetian origin that circulated with the florin, which in 1531 was succeeded by the scudo, a piece of French origin (écu) that remained the monetary unit of the Pontifical States. At the same time, there appeared the zecchino. The ancient papal florin was equal to 2 scudi and 11 baiocchi (1 baiocco = 0.01 scudi); one ducat was equal to one scudo and 9 baiocchi. The scudo also underwent fluctuations, in the market and in its weight: the so-called scudo delle stampe (1595) was worth 184·2 baiocchi, that is, a little less than 2 scudi. Benedict XIII re-established the good quality of the alloy, but under Pius VI it again deteriorated. In 1835 Gregory XVI regulated the monetary system of the Pontifical States, establishing the scudo as the unit, and dividing it into 100 baiocchi, while the baiocco was divided into 5 quattrini (the quattrino, until 1591, had been equal to ¼ of a baiocco). The scudo was coined both in gold and in silver; there were pieces of 10 scudi, called Gregorine; and pieces of 5 scudi, and of 2½ scudi were also coined. The scudo of the eighteenth century was equal to l·65 scudi of Pius VII, which last was adopted by Gregory XVI; the zecchino was worth 2·2 scudi. The scudo is equal to 5·3 lire in the monetary system of the Latin Union. The fractional silver coins were the half scudo, and the giulio, called also paolo, which was equal to 0·1 seudi. Julius II created the latter coin to put the carlini of Charles of Anjou out of circulation, those coins being of bad alloy. There were pieces of 2 giulii that were called papetti, at Rome, and lire at Bologna, a name that was later given to them officially. A grosso, introduced in 1736, was equal to half a giulio (25 baiocchi); there were also the mezzogrosso, and the testone = 30 giulii. The copper coins were the baiocco or soldo (which was called bolognino, at Bologna) and the 2 baiocchi piece. The name baiocco is derived from that of the city of Bayeux.

=== Other coins used in the Pontifical States ===
Other coins that were used at various times in the Pontifical States were the baiocchella = 1 baiocco, a copper piece with a silver surface, and therefore smaller than the copper baiocco; there were coins made of the two metals of the values, respectively of 2, 4, 6, 8, 12 and 16 baiocchi; the copper madonnina (Bologna) = 5 baiocchi; the sampietrino (Pius VI) = 2½ baiocchi; the paludella was a soldo, made of an alloy of copper and silver, established by Pius VI as a more easily portable specie with which to pay the workmen of the Pontine Marshes; the sesino = 0·4 of a baiocco = 2 quattrini; the leonina (Leo XII) = 4·4 Gregorian scudi; the doblone = 2 old scudi = 3·3 scudi of the nineteenth century; there were dobloni of the relative values of 4, 8, and 16 scudi; the doppio was worth a little less than the doblone, that is, 3·21 scudi of the nineteenth Century; at Bologna there were also coined scudi of 80 baiocchi, and half-scudi of 40 baiocchi; the gabella was a Bolognese coin, equivalent to a carlino or giulio; the gabellone was equivalent to 26 bolognini (baiocchi); the franco, in the fifteenth century, was worth 12 baiocchi at Bologna, but only 10 baiocchi at Rome; the alberetti was a two-baiocco piece that was coined by the Roman Republic (1798–99).

== Recent reassessment ==
Much has changed on the subject of the Papal Mint and Papal coinage since the original publication of the Catholic Encyclopedia in 1913, from which most of the preceding article is taken.

Not only has the Temporal power of the Papacy, lost since 1870, been restored in the form of the Vatican City State, but also much new research has been done on the subject of Papal coins, and with it many new discoveries. Moreover, the whole legal and operational basis for the issue of papal coinage has been twice substantially modified, once by the Lateran Pacts and once with the introduction of the euro.

While the Catholic Encyclopedia article states, "There can be no papal coins of earlier date than that of the temporal power of the popes", in fact coinage may well have predated the emancipation of the Papal territories from Byzantine authority. The pope, going back at least as far as Gregory the Great (590-604), acted on numerous occasions as the paymaster for the Emperor's troops. So it is not too surprising that at some point the Pope might have had to issue the Emperor's coins himself. A number of silver issues from the Rome mint came to light in the early 1980s and these have been demonstrated as showing the monogram of the reigning Pontiff, even though they also have the devices of the Byzantine emperors of the seventh and early eighth centuries. This fact pushes the known date of the start of Papal coinage back at least as far as the reign of Pope Vitalian (657-672). Similar issues are known for Pope Adeodatus II, Sisinnius, Gregory II, Gregory III, and Zacharias.

All legitimate pontiffs in the 250-year period from Gregory III to Benedict VII issued coins, with the exceptions of Stephen II (who reigned for only two or three days), Boniface VI, Leo V, Lando, Leo VI, and Stephen IX. Coins are known also for the Antipope Christopher, but these are probably forgeries. After the death of Benedict VII in 983, no further issues were undertaken. However, some authors list several later tenth, eleventh, and twelfth century popes as also having issued coins, but these attributions are due mostly to faulty research. The so-called issues of Pope Paschal II are later counterfeits. From the last two decades of the twelfth and all the thirteenth and fourteenth centuries, the Roman Senate issued coins under its own name, without reference to the Pope.

Papal coinage resumed with the issues of Boniface VIII in 1300, from the mint of Sorges in France, but thirty years earlier, during the so-called Long Conclave of 1268-1271, an issue of silver coins was also struck. These coins are the first of the Sede Vacante (vacant chair) pieces, which are issued during the interregnum between popes. There were no further Sede Vacante issues until 1378, but the practice became more regular after the death of Leo X in 1521.

All popes from Boniface VIII to Pius IX issued coins, with the notable exception of Leo XI, who was pope for four weeks in April 1605. However, a pope with an even shorter reign, Urban VII, did issue coins. Pius III and Innocent IX also issued coins, but in gold only. Additionally, four of the antipopes from the Great Schism (1378–1417), Clement VII, Benedict XIII, Alexander V, and John XXIII also issued their own coinage.

== Modern history of Papal coin ==
No official collection of the papal coins was made before the time of Benedict XIV, who acquired from Cardinal Passionei the valuable collection of Scilla, which was enriched later by other acquisitions; in 1809, however, it was taken to Paris, and was never recovered. In the nineteenth century the Holy See obtained possession of the collection of Belli, begun in the previous century by Luigi Tommasini, and this collection became the basis of the Numismatic Cabinet, which is under the direction of the prefect of the Vatican Library and has a special custodian.

Since the loss of the Temporal power, the pope has not coined money; each year, however, he strikes the customary medal for the feast of Saint Peter, which is given to cardinals and to the employees of the Roman Curia.

In 1866, following the lead of the newly united Italy (which had occupied 2/3 of the Papal States in 1860), the old baiocco/scudo system was scrapped in favor of the new lira, divided into 100 centesimi. This brought Papal coinage size, weight and composition into alignment with the rest of the Latin Monetary Union countries like France, Switzerland, and Spain, in addition to Italy.

After the confiscation of the remainder of the Papal States and Rome by Italy in 1870, there were of course no further issues until the establishment of the Vatican City State in 1929. However, there are pattern 5-Lire pieces of Leo XIII, coined in 1878 apparently by French friends of the Papacy. No such honor was bestowed on either Pius X or Benedict XV, however.

From 1931, the coins of Vatican City have been struck at the Italian State Mint in Rome (there are also coins dated 1929 and 1930, which were struck in 1931 and backdated accordingly), and are legal tender in both Italy and San Marino, in addition to the Holy See. Initially, coins were produced in the denominations of 5 and 10 Centesimi (in bronze), 20 and 50 Centesimi, and 1 and 2 Lire in nickel, 5 and 10 Lire in silver, and 100 Lire in gold. All popes since Pius XI have had coin issues, including the brief reign of John Paul I, which is represented by a 1000-Lire silver piece struck posthumously.

As the value of the Italian Lira declined in the years since World War II, new denominations in progressively higher values were introduced, with the lower values dropping off. All the centesimi denominations ceased to be issued after 1946, the gold 100-Lire after 1959, and the by-now tiny aluminum 1- and 2-Lire issues ended after 1977, with the 5-Lire disappearing a year later.

Before the Lira was replaced by the euro in 2002, issues for John Paul II included a 10-Lire piece in aluminum, a 20-Lire piece in an aluminum-bronze alloy, 50-Lire and 100-Lire pieces in copper-nickel, a 200-Lire coin in aluminum-bronze, and ringed, bimetallic 500- and 1000-Lire pieces for circulation and in the annual sets. Additionally, commemorative 500- and 1000-Lire pieces were struck in silver, as were 10,000-Lire pieces struck since 1995 for the upcoming Holy Year. Series of two gold coin issues, in the values of 50,000 Lire (.917 Gold, 0.2211 AGW/6.87g, 7.5g total weight) and 100,000 Lire (.917 Gold, 0.4422 AGW/13.74g, 15g total weight), were also struck in connection with Holy Year 2000. These were minted from 1996 to 2000.

Agreements with the European Union allowed the Holy See to switch to euro coinage when Italy did in 2002, even though Vatican City is not a member state of the European Union. Current issues include 1, 2, 5, 10, 20, 50 cent and 1 and 2 euro denominations, in addition to commemorative coins of 5 and 10 euro in silver, as well as 20 and 50 euro in gold.

All these issues, the regular coinage, and the silver and gold commemoratives, can be obtained through mail order directly from the Vatican at the following address:

Ufficio Filatelico e Numismatico
Governatorato
00120 Città del Vaticano
VATICAN CITY

== Sources ==
- Berman, Allen. Papal Coins, Attic Books, 1991
- Krause, Chet and Mishler, Cliff. Standard Catalog of World Coins, Krause Publications, 2007
- Pollard, John F. (2005). Money and the Rise of the Modern Papacy: Financing the Vatican, 1850–1950. Cambridge University Press.
- Ryan, John Carlin. A Handbook of Papal Coins 1268-1534, John Carlin Ryan, 1989
- Sear, David. Byzantine Coins and Their Values, B.A. Seaby, Ltd., 1987
