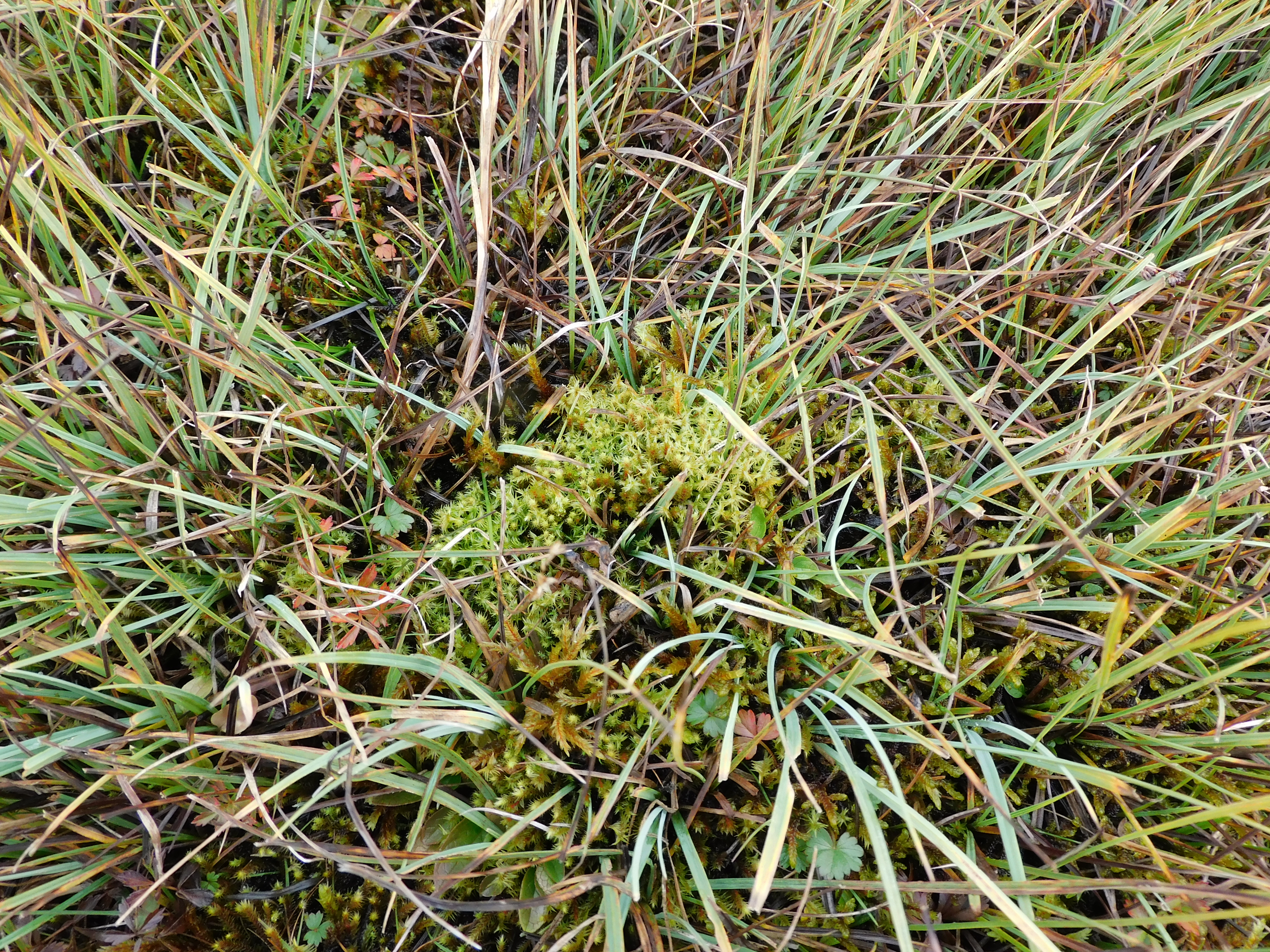

Conservation status
- Secure (NatureServe)

Scientific classification
- Kingdom: Plantae
- Division: Bryophyta
- Class: Bryopsida
- Subclass: Bryidae
- Order: Splachnales
- Family: Meesiaceae
- Genus: Meesia
- Species: M. triquetra

Binomial name
- Meesia triquetra (Richt.) Ångstr.

= Meesia triquetra =

Three-ranked hump-moss

Species of moss

Meesia triquetra, the three-ranked hump-moss, is a moss that occurs all around the Northern Hemisphere in higher latitudes.

== Description ==
Meesia triqueta grows in small tufts or cushions. The plants, often large, are acrocarpous and dioicous. In color they are dark-green to grass-green above, occasionally red-brown below due to dense rhizoids. The plant's stems are not branched or little branched, pale-brown to yellow-brown, closely foliate, and 2–14 cm high. Its leaves are decurrent, squarrose (spreading) when moist, triangular to ovate to lanceolate, somewhat crispate (contorted), 2–3½ mm long, and tristichous (in three obvious ranks). The leaf margins are sharply serrate or denticulate to the base or nearly so, plane or sometimes recurved in the middle of the leaf. The costa is relatively narrow (less than 1/5 the width of the leaf base), subpercurrent to percurrent, gradually tapering at distal end. The leaf's apex is acute to acuminate (sharply pointed). The lamina is unistratose throughout. The perigonia of Meesia triqueta' are terminal in discoid heads. The seta is straight and smooth, brown to yellow-brown, and very long (4–10 cm). The capsule is asymmetrical, somewhat pyriform, 2¾–5½ mm long including the neck; the hypophysis (neck) is long (comprising up to ½ of capsule length), moderately well-defined, not much wrinkled when dry; the urn is oblong to short-cylindric, arcuate and asymmetric, brown to yellow-brown, up to 4 mm long, and when dry, wrinkled but not regularly sulcate. The operculum is short-conic; the endostome cilia are often rather well-developed. The plant's spores are finely papillose.

Meersia triquetra is easily recognized by its distinct three-ranked leaf arrangement and for being dioicous. It may be distinguished from M. uliginosa by its squarrose leaves; narrow costa relative to the size of the leaf base; serrate, planar leaf margins; and acute leaf tips. In contrast, M. uliginosa a wide (up to 1/3 of the leaf base) costa, entire, revolute leaf margins, and blunt apices. Other Meesia species also have blunt apices.

== Distribution and habitat ==
This species has a circumboreal distribution: it is found in Northern Europe, northern Asia, Greenland, Canada, and the northern United States, Some discoveries have been reported from Oceania.

These mosses occur in wetland sites, specifically, within wet woods in the wettest portions of what are called "extreme rich fens" (i.e., fens having surface waters with high pH and calcium concentrations). Montagnes describes this species as a "rich fen indicator of high fidelity." Associates include Scorpidium spp. and Drepanocladus revolvens.

The fire ecology of this plant is not known; however, fens rarely burn. Excess soot from a nearby fire, however, might negatively affect habitat quality. Fire return intervals in conifer bogs, a somewhat similar mire-type habitat, are estimated to be about once every 150–200 years. Fire does significant damage to peat, but the bog must be dry (as during a drought year) in order to burn; typically, bogs are not dry enough.

== Conservation status and threats ==
U.S. Forest Service Pacific Southwest Region Sensitive Species.

California Native Plant Society List 4.2

NatureServe California State Rank: S2.2; Global Rank: G5

Fens are delicate habitats susceptible to impacts from livestock grazing, hydrologic alteration, construction and continued use of roads, and peat mining. Rich fen habitats are especially susceptible to modification. The surface water chemistry of rich fens is sensitive to climatic and anthropogenic influences. This species has reached near extinction in Europe.
