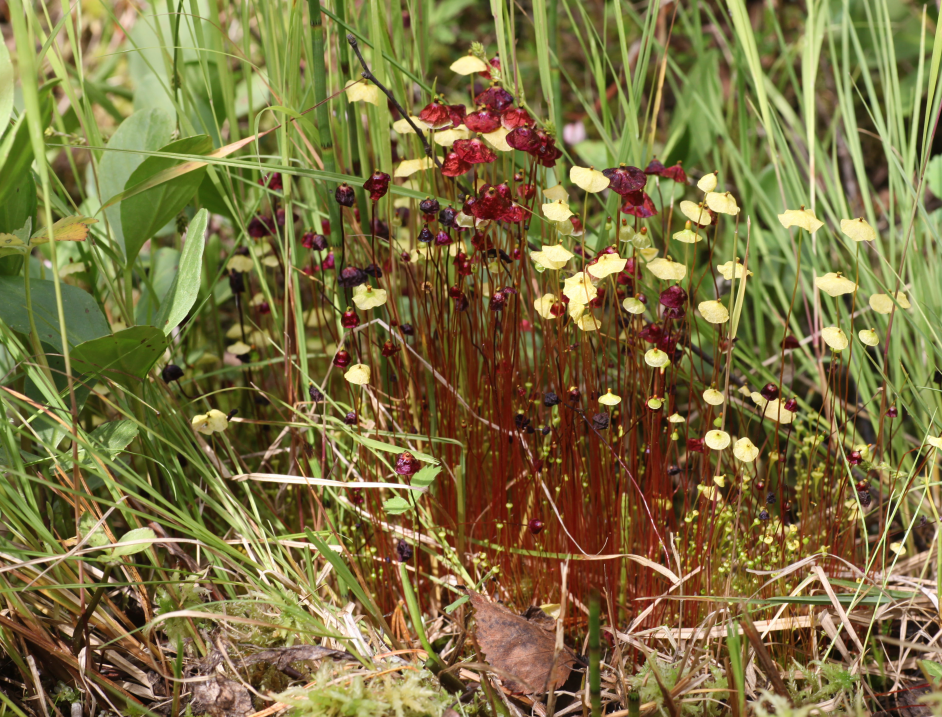
- Splachnum rubrum

Scientific classification
- Kingdom: Plantae
- Division: Bryophyta
- Class: Bryopsida
- Subclass: Bryidae
- Order: Splachnales
- Family: Splachnaceae
- Genus: Splachnum; Hedw.

= Splachnum =

Genus of mosses

Splachnum, also known as dung moss or petticoat moss, is a genus of moss that is well known for its entomophily. It commonly grows on patches of dung or decomposing animal matter.

== Etymology ==
The name Splachnum comes from the Ancient Greek word splachnos, meaning guts or entrails. This refers to appearance of the top of the plant's dried sporophyte - it is often red and wrinkled.

== Description ==
This genus is known for its unique sporophyte structure. Sporophytes are brightly coloured and produce an odour similar to dung meant to attract insects. This sort of chemical mimicry of decomposing matter is unique in Splachnum and closely related genera.

== Evolution and taxonomy ==
Because Splachnum grows in such specific conditions, it is used as a model species for understanding the evolutionary mechanisms necessary for co-existing in patchy habitats.

== Species ==
- Splachnum sphaericum
- Splachnum rubrum
- Splachnum luteum
- Splachnum ampullaceum
- Splachnum adolphi-friederici
- Splachnum austriacum
- Splachnum melanocaulon
- Splachnum pennsylvanicum
- Splachnum resectum
- Splachnum vasculosum
- Splachnum weberbaueri

== See also ==
- Bryophyta
- Entomophily
