= Aplodon =

Aplodon is the scientific name of two genera of organisms and may refer to:

- Aplodon (plant), a genus of mosses in the family Splachnaceae
- Aplodon (gastropod), a genus of snails in the family Modulidae
- Aplodon, a genus of mollusks in the family Mycetopodidae; synonym of Monocondylaea
