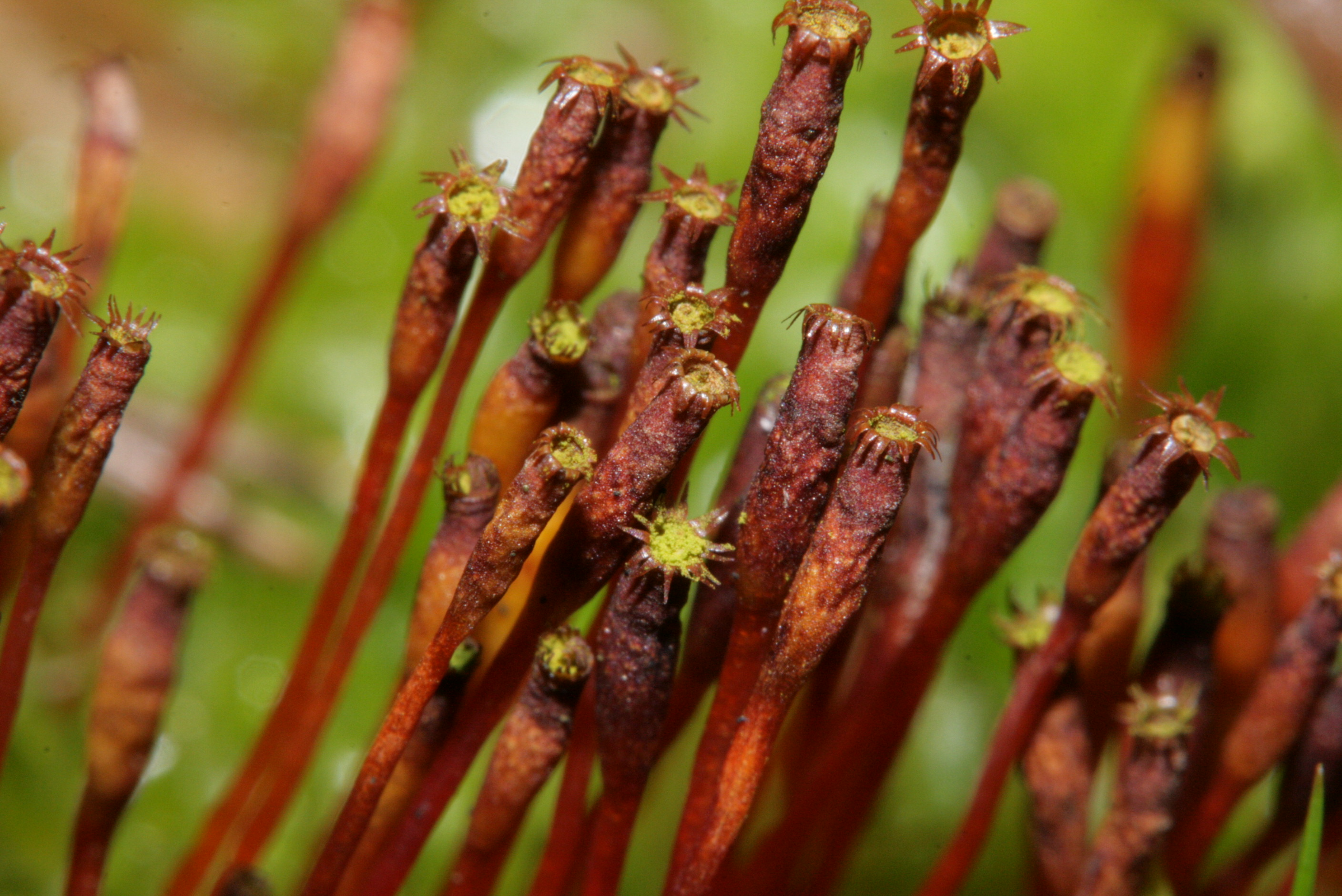
- Tayloria serrata

Scientific classification
- Kingdom: Plantae
- Division: Bryophyta
- Class: Bryopsida
- Subclass: Bryidae
- Superorder: Bryanae
- Order: Splachnales
- Family: Splachnaceae
- Genus: Tayloria; Hook. [1816]

= Tayloria (plant) =

Genus of mosses

Tayloria is a genus of mosses in the family Splachnaceae. It comprises 45 species, divided among 6 subgenera:

- Tayloria subg. Tayloria

- Tayloria acuminata Homsch.
- Tayloria delavayi (Besch.) Besch.
- Tayloria froelichiana (Hedw.) Broth.
- Tayloria grandis (Long) Goffinet & Shaw
- Tayloria kilimandscharica Broth.
- Tayloria rudimenta Bai & Tan
- Tayloria rudolphiana (Garov.) B.S.G.
- Tayloria serrata (Hedw.) B.S.G.
- Tayloria splachnoides (Schwagr.) W.J. Hook.
- Tayloria tenuis (With.) W.P. Schimp.

- Tayloria subg. Pseudotetraplodon A.K. Kop.

- Tayloria altorum Herzog
- Tayloria dubyi Broth.
- Tayloria novo-guinensis E.B. Bart.
- Tayloria octoblepharum (W.J. Hook.) Mitt.
- Tayloria scabriseta (W.J. Hook.) Mitt.
- Tayloria stenophysata (Herz.) A. Kop.
- Tayloria tasmanica Broth.

- Tayloria subg. Eremodon (Wils.) Broth.

- Tayloria callophylla (C. Müll.) Mitt.
- Tayloria gunnii (Wils.) J.H. Willis
- Tayloria magellanica (Brid.) Mitt.
- Tayloria mirabilis (Card.) Broth.
- Tayloria purpurascens (W.J. Hook. & Wils.) Broth.

- Tayloria subg. Cyrtodon (R. Br.) Lindb.

- Tayloria alpicola Broth.
- Tayloria hornschuchii (Grev. & Am.) Broth.
- Tayloria jacquemontii (B.S.G.) Mitt.
- Tayloria lingulata (Dick.) Lind.
- Tayloria nepalensis Iwat & Steere
- Tayloria pseudoalpicola Iwat. & Steere

- Tayloria subg. Brachymitrion (Tayl.) Broth.

- Tayloria cochabambae MOll. Hall.
- Tayloria immersa (Goffinet) Goffinet, Shaw & Cox
- Tayloria jamesonii (Tayl.) Müll. Hall.
- Tayloria laciniata Spruce
- Tayloria moritziana Müll. Hall.
- Tayloria pocsii A. K. Kop.

- Tayloria subg. Orthodon (R. Br.) Broth.

- Tayloria arenaria (C. Müll) Broth.
- Tayloria borneensis Dix.
- Tayloria chiapensis H. Crum
- Tayloria indica Mitt.
- Tayloria isleana (Besch.) Broth.
- Tayloria longiseta E. B. Bart.
- Tayloria orthodonta (P. de Beauv.) Wijk & Marg.
- Tayloria sandwicensis (C. Müll) Broth.
- Tayloria solitaria (Card.) T. Kop. & W.A. Weber
- Tayloria squarrosa (W.J. Hook.) T. Kop.
- Tayloria subglabra (Griffith) Mitt.
