= Tayloria nepalensis =

Scientific classification
- Kingdom: Plantae
- Division: Bryophyta
- Class: Bryopsida
- Subclass: Bryidae
- Order: Splachnales
- Family: Splachnaceae
- Genus: Tayloria
- Species: T. nepalensis

Binomial name
- Tayloria nepalensis Z.Iwats. & Steere, 1975

Species of moss

Tayloria nepalensis is an extant dung moss species found in Nepal. It was first described by Zennoske Iwatsuki and William Campbell Steere in 1975.
