= Amblyodon =

Scientific classification
- Kingdom: Plantae
- Division: Bryophyta
- Class: Bryopsida
- Subclass: Bryidae
- Order: Splachnales
- Family: Meesiaceae
- Genus: Amblyodon; P.Beauv.

Genus of mosses

Amblyodon is a genus of mosses belonging to the family Meesiaceae.

The genus was first described by Palisot de Beauvois.

The species of this genus are found in Europe and Northern America.

Species:

- Amblyodon dealbatus (Sw. ex Hedw.) P.Beauv.
