= Hypnum squarrosum =

Hypnum squarrosum may refer to two different species of plants:

- Hypnum squarrosum (Hedw.) F.Weber & D.Mohr, a taxonomic synonym for Paludella squarrosa, the angled paludella moss
- Hypnum squarrosum Hedw., a taxonomic synonym for Rhytidiadelphus squarrosus, square goose neck moss
