= T. nepalensis =

T. nepalensis may refer to:

- Tayloria nepalensis, a dung moss
- Tostkar nepalensis, a ground beetle
- Trigonotoma nepalensis, a ground beetle
