= Tetraplodon =

Tetraplodon may refer to:

- Tetraplodon (bivalve), a genus of bivalves in the family Hyriidae
- Tetraplodon (plant), a genus of mosses in the family Splachnaceae
