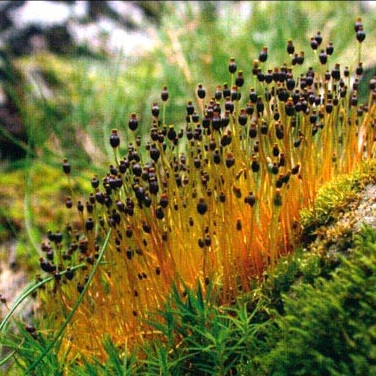

Scientific classification
- Kingdom: Plantae
- Division: Bryophyta
- Class: Bryopsida
- Subclass: Bryidae
- Order: Splachnales
- Family: Splachnaceae
- Genus: Splachnum
- Species: S. sphaericum

Binomial name
- Splachnum sphaericum Hedw.

= Splachnum sphaericum =

Species of moss in the family Splachnaceae

Splachnum sphaericum, also known as pinkstink dung moss, is a species of moss. This species occurs in North America. It also occurs in upland Britain, where it is known as round-fruited collar-moss and in north temperate and boreal regions of Europe. Its habitat is bog and wet heathland where it grows on herbivore dung. This and other Splachnum species are entomophilous. The sporophytes, which are generally coloured red or black, produce an odour of carrion that is attractive to flies and the spores are dispersed by flies to fresh dung.
