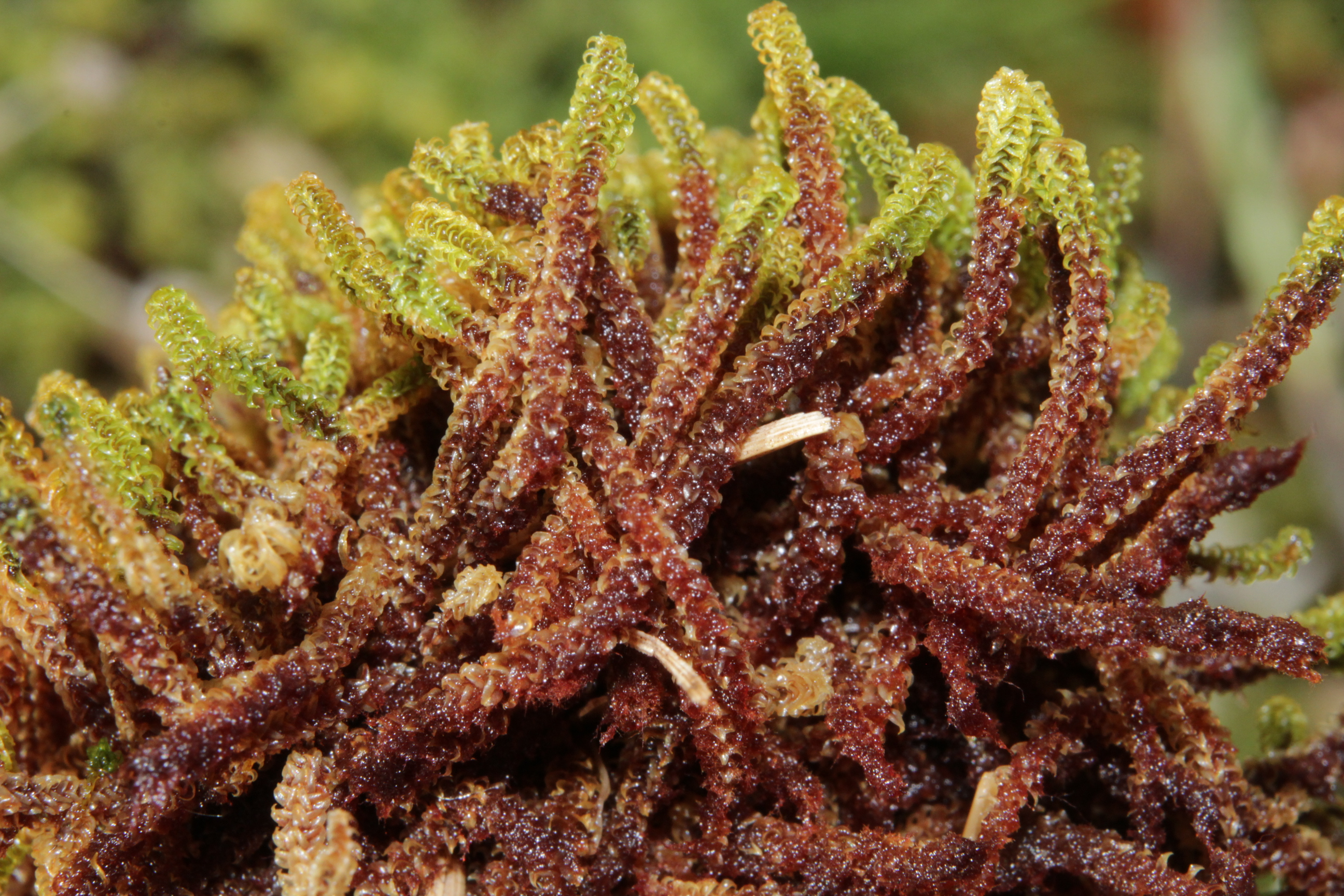

Scientific classification
- Kingdom: Plantae
- Division: Bryophyta
- Class: Bryopsida
- Subclass: Bryidae
- Order: Splachnales
- Family: Meesiaceae
- Genus: Paludella
- Species: P. squarrosa

Binomial name
- Paludella squarrosa (Hedw.) Brid.

Synonyms
- List: Bryum squarrosum Hedw.; Hypnum paludella F.Weber & D.Mohr; Hypnum squarrosum (Hedw.) F.Weber & D.Mohr; Meesia squarrosa (Hedw.) Wahlenb.; Orthopyxis squarrosa (Hedw.) P.Beauv.; Paludella squarrosa f. leptocarpa I.Hagen; Pohlia squarrosa (Hedw.) Spreng.

= Paludella squarrosa =

Species of moss

Paludella squarrosa, the angled paludella moss, is a species of moss belonging to the family Meesiaceae.

It is native to the Northern Hemisphere.
