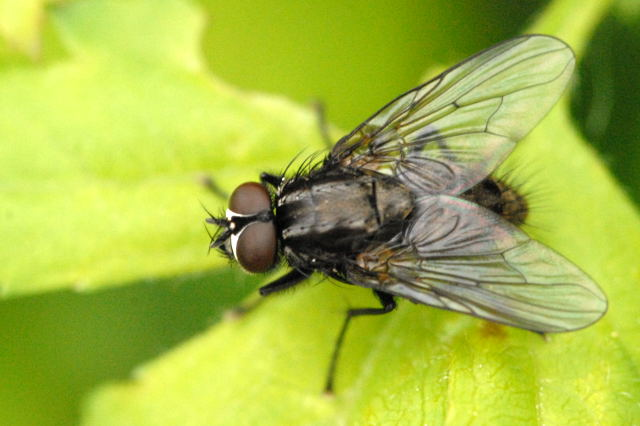
- Myospila meditabunda Male

Scientific classification
- Kingdom: Animalia
- Phylum: Arthropoda
- Clade: Pancrustacea
- Class: Insecta
- Order: Diptera
- Family: Muscidae
- Genus: Myospila
- Species: M. meditabunda

Binomial name
- Myospila meditabunda (Fabricius, 1781)

Synonyms
- Musca meditabunda Fabricius, 1781

= Myospila meditabunda =

Species of fly

Myospila meditabunda is a fly from the family Muscidae.
