= Aplodon wormskioldii =

Scientific classification
- Kingdom: Plantae
- Division: Bryophyta
- Class: Bryopsida
- Subclass: Bryidae
- Order: Splachnales
- Family: Splachnaceae
- Genus: Aplodon; R.Br.
- Species: A. wormskioldii

Binomial name
- Aplodon wormskioldii (Hornem.) R.Br.

Species of moss

Aplodon is a monotypic genus of mosses belonging to the family Splachnaceae. The only species is Aplodon wormskioldii.

The species was described by Robert Brown in 1823.

The species of this genus are found in Subarctic Eurasia and Northern America.
