= Paludella =

Scientific classification
- Kingdom: Plantae
- Division: Bryophyta
- Class: Bryopsida
- Subclass: Bryidae
- Order: Splachnales
- Family: Meesiaceae
- Genus: Paludella; Ehrh. ex Brid.

Genus of mosses

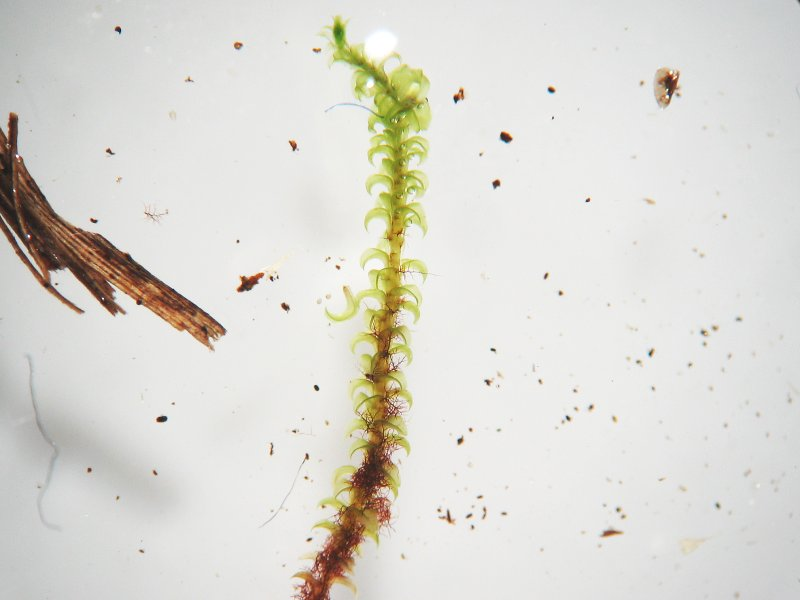
Paludella squarrosa

Paludella is a genus of mosses belonging to the family Meesiaceae.

The genus was first described by Jakob Friedrich Ehrhart.

The species of this genus are found in Northern Hemisphere.

Species:

- Paludella squarrosa Bridel, 1817
