= David Meese =

Dutch botanist

- Born: 25 December 1723; Leeuwarden
- Died: 23 August 1770 (aged 46); Franeker
- Known for: Bryology
- Scientific career
- Fields: Botany
- Workplaces: University of Franeker
- Author abbrev. (botany): Meese

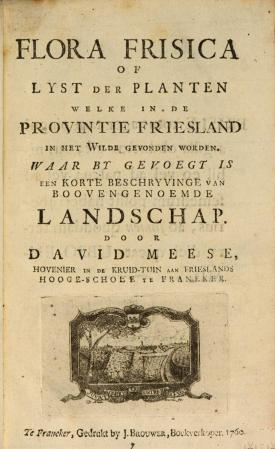
Cover of the Flora frisica

David Meese (25 December 1723 – 23 August 1770) was a Dutch botanist notable for his authorship of the Flora frisica in 1760.

== Career ==
Born into a low class family, Meese became a self taught herbalist. His skills were recognized by the University of Franeker where he was placed in charge of the academic gardens at the college in 1752.

In 1760, Meese published a flora of Friesland, the Flora frisica, which followed the Linnaean system of classification. He followed this with the publication of the two-part Plantarum rudimenta etc. in 1763, written in both Latin and Dutch. He was known for his experiments into moss physiology. He investigated the propagation of the common hair moss, Polytrichum commune, and was among the first to write an account on the morphology of spore germination.

Among his inventions was a special seeder, which was a wooden cart with two wheels and holes on the back wall to allow seed to pass through. He also invented a seed drill.

The moss genus Meesia was named after him in 1788 by his contemporary Johann Hedwig.

== Publications ==
- Meese, David (1760). Flora frisica: of, Lyst der planten welke in de provintie Friesland in het wilde gevonden worden; waar by gevoegt is een korte beschryvinge van boovengenoemde landschap. gedrukt by Jacob Brouwer.
- Meese, David (1761). Het XIX classe van de Genera plantarum van de heer Carolus Linnæus, Syngenesia genaamt: Opgeheldert en vermeerdert : Mitsgaders etc. by H.A. de Chalmot.
- Meese, David; Borbone di Napoli casa (1763). Plantarum rudimenta, sive illarum methodus. Ducta ex differentia earum seminum, cotyledonum, aliarumque partium, quae brevi tempore post earum propullulationem, ac ulterius incrementum, in iis conspiciuntur. excudit Guilielmus Coulon.
- Meese, David (1768). Antwoord op de vraag: welke zyn de beste en minst kostbaare middelen, om het afneemen der oevers van het Haarlemmer Meer te beletten?.
