= Myospila bimaculata =

Scientific classification
- Kingdom: Animalia
- Phylum: Arthropoda
- Clade: Pancrustacea
- Class: Insecta
- Order: Diptera
- Family: Muscidae
- Genus: Myospila
- Species: M. bimaculata

Binomial name
- Myospila bimaculata (Macquart, 1834)

Synonyms
- Curtonevra bimaculata Macquart, 1834; Myospila hennigi Gregor & Povolný, 1959

Species of fly

Myospila bimaculata is a fly from the family Muscidae.
