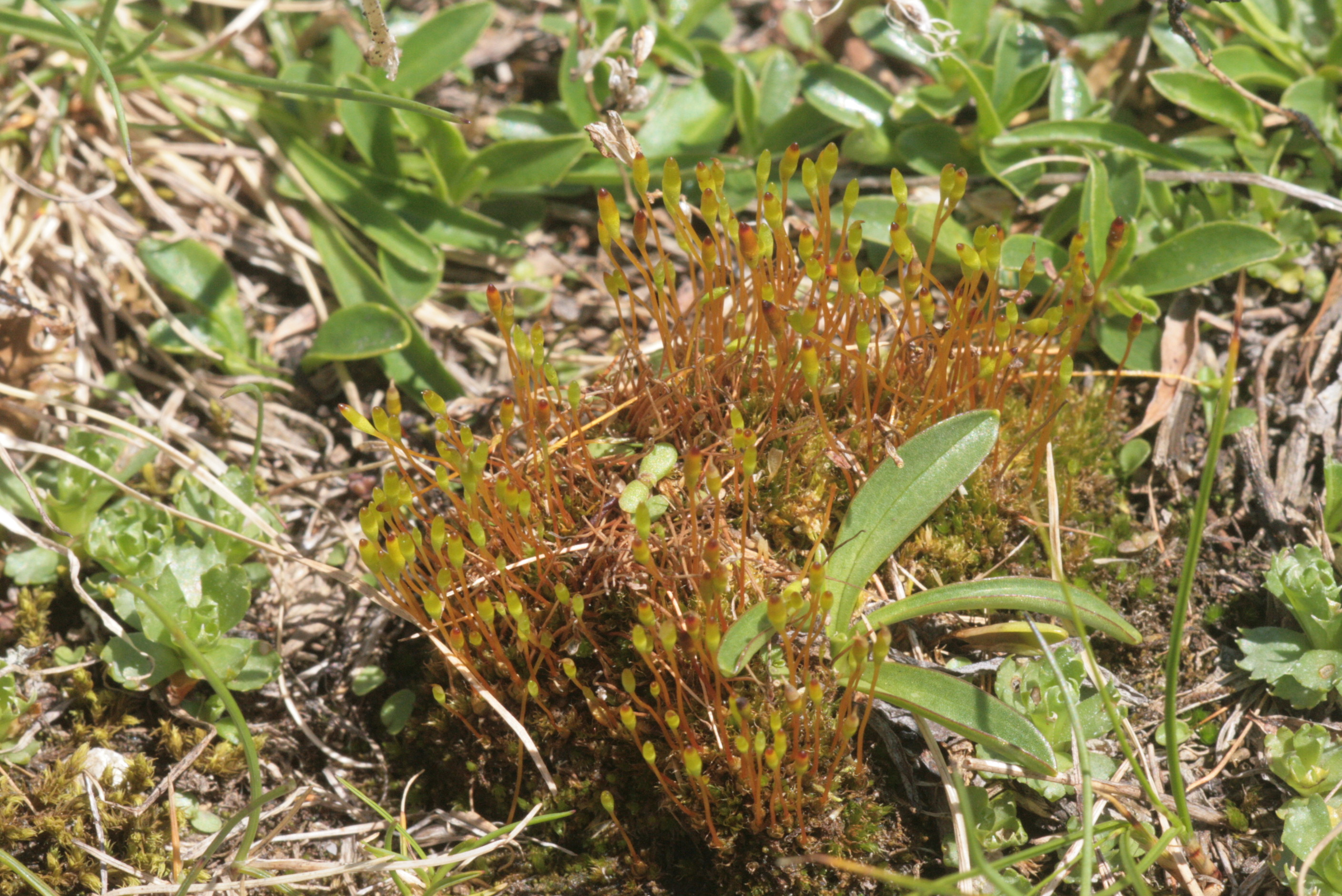
- Tetraplodon mnioides

Scientific classification
- Kingdom: Plantae
- Division: Bryophyta
- Class: Bryopsida
- Subclass: Bryidae
- Order: Splachnales
- Family: Splachnaceae
- Genus: Tetraplodon; Bruch & Schimp.

= Tetraplodon (plant) =

Genus of mosses

Tetraplodon is a genus of mosses belonging to the family Splachnaceae.

The genus has a cosmopolitan distribution.

Species:

- Tetraplodon angustatus (Hedw.) Bruch & Schimp.
- Tetraplodon blyttii Frisvoll
- Tetraplodon bryoides Lindb.
- Tetraplodon caulescens (Steud.) Lindb.
- Tetraplodon fuegianus Besch.
- Tetraplodon itatiaiae Müll.Hal.
- Tetraplodon mnioides (Sw. ex Hedw.) Bruch & Schimp.
- Tetraplodon pallidus I.Hagen
- Tetraplodon paradoxus (R.Br.) I.Hagen
- Tetraplodon stenophysatus Herzog
- Tetraplodon tomentosus Sehnem
- Tetraplodon urceolatus (Hedw.) Bruch & Schimp.
