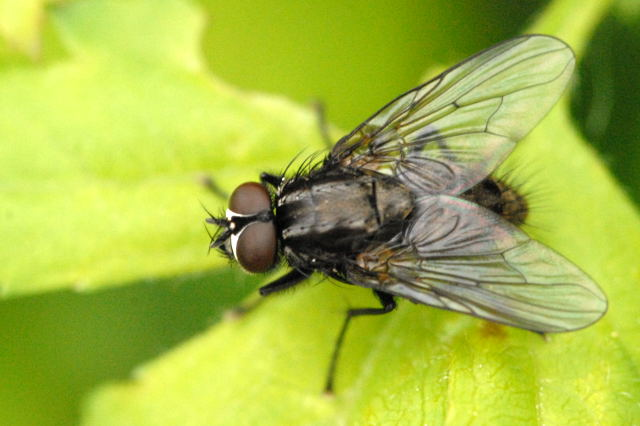
- Myospila meditabunda Male

Scientific classification
- Kingdom: Animalia
- Phylum: Arthropoda
- Clade: Pancrustacea
- Class: Insecta
- Order: Diptera
- Family: Muscidae
- Subfamily: Mydaeinae
- Genus: Myospila; Rondani, 1856

Type species
- Musca meditabunda Fabricius, 1781

Synonyms
- Myiospila Rondani, 1868

= Myospila =

Genus of flies

Myospila is a genus from the fly family Muscidae.

== Species ==
The following species are recognized:

- Myospila aberrans (Shannon & Del Ponte, 1926)
- Myospila acrula Wei, 2012
- Myospila alpina (Hendel, 1901)
- Myospila angula Zhou & Wei, 2019
- Myospila angustifrons (Malloch, 1922)
- Myospila apicaliciliola Xue & Tian, 2014
- Myospila argentata (Walker, 1856)
- Myospila armata Snyder, 1940
- Myospila ateripraefemura Feng, 2005
- Myospila aureorufa Vockeroth, 1972
- Myospila banyanensis Shinonaga, 2015
- Myospila basalis Shinonaga & Tewari, 2008
- Myospila basilara Wei, 2012
- Myospila bekilyana (Séguy, 1938)
- Myospila bicoloripes (Emden, 1951)
- Myospila bimaculata (Macquart, 1834)
- Myospila bina (Wiedemann, 1830)
- Myospila binoides Feng, 2005
- Myospila bodeica Feng, 2005
- Myospila borneoensis (Malloch, 1935)
- Myospila breviscutellata Xue & Kiang, 1992
- Myospila bruma Feng, 2003
- Myospila brunettiana (Enderlein, 1927)
- Myospila bruuneusa Wei, 2012
- Myospila canoapicata (Emden, 1965)
- Myospila capensis (Zielke, 1971)
- Myospila cetera Wei, 2012
- Myospila changzhenga Feng, 2000
- Myospila chiangmaiensis Shinonaga, 2015
- Myospila cincta (Bigot, 1885)
- Myospila compressipalpis (Stein, 1910)
- Myospila coxata (Malloch, 1935)
- Myospila cuthberstoni Snyder, 1940
- Myospila cyanea (Macquart, 1844)
- Myospila dissimilis (Emden, 1965)
- Myospila divisa Zhou & Wei, 2019
- Myospila dolosa (Stein, 1909)
- Myospila dubia (Stein, 1920)
- Myospila effeminata Vockeroth, 1972
- Myospila elongata (Emden, 1965)
- Myospila emeishanensis Feng, 2005
- Myospila farctinigra Sun & Wei, 2019
- Myospila femorata (Malloch, 1935)
- Myospila fengi Wei, 2011
- Myospila flavibasis (Malloch, 1925)
- Myospila flavibasisoides Wei, 2011
- Myospila flavicans Malloch, 1921
- Myospila flavicauda Wei, 1991
- Myospila flavihumera Feng, 2001
- Myospila flavihumeroides Feng, 2001
- Myospila flavilauta Xue & Li, 1998
- Myospila flavilobulusa Wei, 2012
- Myospila flavipedis Shinonaga & Huang, 2007
- Myospila flavipennis (Malloch, 1928)
- Myospila flavitibia Guan, Feng & Ma, 2007
- Myospila floresana (Hennig, 1952)
- Myospila fluminensis Couri & Lopes, 1988
- Myospila frigora Qian & Feng, 2005
- Myospila frigoroida Qian & Feng, 2005
- Myospila fulviventris (Pont, 1968)
- Myospila fumidala Vockeroth, 1972
- Myospila fuscicoxa (Li, 1980)
- Myospila fuscicoxoides Xue & Lin, 1998
- Myospila gagnei (Zielke, 1971)
- Myospila graminicola (Doleschall, 1858)
- Myospila grisea (Séguy, 1937)
- Myospila guangdonga Xue, 1998
- Myospila hainanensis Xue, 1998
- Myospila hisamatsui Shinonaga, 2009
- Myospila huajhiangensis Zhou & Wei, 2019
- Myospila japonica Shinonaga & Iwasa, 1983
- Myospila kangdingica Qian & Feng, 2005
- Myospila kinabalensis Shinonaga, 2009
- Myospila laevis (Stein, 1900)
- Myospila lasiophthalma (Emden, 1965)
- Myospila lauta (Stein, 1918)
- Myospila lautoides Feng, 2005
- Myospila laveis (Stein, 1900)
- Myospila leechi (Zielke, 1974)
- Myospila lenticeps (Thomson, 1869)
- Myospila lindbergi (Emden, 1958)
- Myospila longa Wei, 2011
- Myospila lurida Wei, 2014
- Myospila maculiseta Snyder, 1940
- Myospila maculiventris Malloch, 1921
- Myospila magnatra Wei, 1991
- Myospila maoershanensis Xue & Tian, 2014
- Myospila matogrossensis Couri & Lopes, 1988
- Myospila maura (Stein, 1906)
- Myospila meditabunda (Fabricius, 1781)
- Myospila melicusa Wei, 2014
- Myospila melsetter (Snyder, 1953)
- Myospila metallica Shinonaga, 2015
- Myospila miaolingensis Wei, 2014
- Myospila mimelongata Feng, 2007
- Myospila mingshanana Feng, 2000
- Myospila morosa (Stein, 1918)
- Myospila nigra Shinonaga, 2000
- Myospila nigrifemura Feng, 2005
- Myospila notonuda (Snyder, 1953)
- Myospila notoseta (Snyder, 1953)
- Myospila novaebritanniae Vockeroth, 1972
- Myospila novaehebudae Vockeroth, 1972
- Myospila nudisterna (Pont, 1968)
- Myospila nulla Sun & Wei, 2019
- Myospila nusantara Shinonaga, 2009
- Myospila obscura (Shannon & Del Ponte, 1926)
- Myospila obsoleta (Brauer & Bergenstamm, 1891)
- Myospila orientalis Shinonaga, 2015
- Myospila otanesi (Malloch, 1926)
- Myospila palawanensis Shinonaga, 2015
- Myospila pallidibasis Vockeroth, 1972
- Myospila pallidicornis (Bigot, 1888)
- Myospila papuensis Vockeroth, 1972
- Myospila paradoxalis (Stein, 1903)
- Myospila paralasiophthalma Wei, 2012
- Myospila paratrochanterata Wei, 2012
- Myospila piliungulis Xue & Yang, 1998
- Myospila piliungulisoides Wei, 2012
- Myospila pingbaensis Wei, 2014
- Myospila polita (Malloch, 1935)
- Myospila ponti Xue & Liu, 1998
- Myospila posteriora Zielke, 2023
- Myospila propinqua (Stein, 1900)
- Myospila prosternalis (Emden, 1951)
- Myospila pseudoelongata Shinonaga, 2000
- Myospila pseudolauta Shinonaga, 2015
- Myospila pseudopudica Shinonaga, 2000
- Myospila pudica (Stein, 1915)
- Myospila qiana Wei, 2014
- Myospila ruficollis (Emden, 1965)
- Myospila ruficornica Wei, 2012
- Myospila ruficornis Shinonaga, 2015
- Myospila rufitarsis Shinonaga, 2000
- Myospila rufomarginata (Malloch, 1925)
- Myospila sabahna Shinonaga, 2015
- Myospila scutinigra Zhou & Wei, 2019
- Myospila semidiaphana (Stein, 1918)
- Myospila setinervis (Stein, 1900)
- Myospila setipennis (Malloch, 1930)
- Myospila setosissima Vockeroth, 1972
- Myospila setulinervis (Stein, 1918)
- Myospila siamensis (Malloch, 1926)
- Myospila solennis (Walker, 1856)
- Myospila sordida (Stein, 1910)
- Myospila sparsiseta (Stein, 1915)
- Myospila spec Macquart, 1843
- Myospila squalens (Walker, 1859)
- Myospila steini (Emden, 1965)
- Myospila subbruma Feng, 2003
- Myospila subflavibasis Wei, 2011
- Myospila subflavipennis Xue & Tian, 2014
- Myospila subflavitibia Wei, 2012
- Myospila sublauta Wei, 2011
- Myospila sublurida Wei, 2014
- Myospila subqiana Wei, 2014
- Myospila subtenax Xue, 1998
- Myospila sumatrensis (Malloch, 1935)
- Myospila superba (Stein, 1906)
- Myospila taiwanensis Shinonaga, 2015
- Myospila tenax (Stein, 1918)
- Myospila tienmushanica Feng, 2005
- Myospila toxopei (Malloch, 1929)
- Myospila trinotata (Emden, 1951)
- Myospila trochanterata (Emden, 1965)
- Myospila tumrasvini Shinonaga, 2015
- Myospila vernata Feng, 2005
- Myospila vietnamensis Shinonaga, 2015
- Myospila vittata Wei, 2012
- Myospila xanthisma Shinonaga & Huang, 2007
- Myospila xanthohedra Shinonaga, 2009
- Myospila xanthotarsis Shinonaga, 2015
- Myospila xuthosa Wei, 2011
