= Gabellone =

Gabellone is a surname. Notable people with the surname include:

- Giuseppe Gabellone (born 1973), Italian sculptor and photographer
- Michele Gabellone (1692–1740), Italian composer of operas

Gabella. A silver coin of Bologna, issued in the sixteenth century under Popes Julius III and Marcellus II. It appears to have been a variety of the Carlino. There is a double and a triple, the latter also known as Gabellone. The Gabellone was equivalent to 26 bolognini.

Source - A Dictionary of Numismatic Names - Scholar's Choice Edition by Albert Romer Frey
