= Johann Hedwig =

German botanist

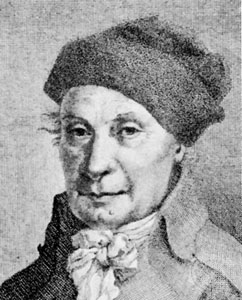
- Johann Hedwig, 1793
- Born: 8 December 1730; Principality of Transylvania
- Died: 18 February 1799 (aged 68)
- Education: University of Leipzig
- Known for: Bryology
- Scientific career
- Fields: Botany
- Author abbrev. (botany): Hedw.

Johann Hedwig (8 December 1730 – 18 February 1799), also styled as Johannes Hedwig, was a German botanist notable for his studies of mosses. He is sometimes called the "father of bryology". He is known for his particular observations of sexual reproduction in the cryptogams. Many of his writings were in Latin, and his name is rendered in Latin as Ioannis Hedwig or Ioanne Hedwig. The standard author abbreviation Hedw. is used to indicate this person as the author when citing a botanical name.

== Early life ==
Hedwig was born in Brașov, Transylvania, on 8 December 1730. As the son of a shoemaker, he grew up in poverty. It was in his childhood he became fascinated with mosses. He went on to study medicine at the University of Leipzig, and received his medical degree in 1759.

== Career ==
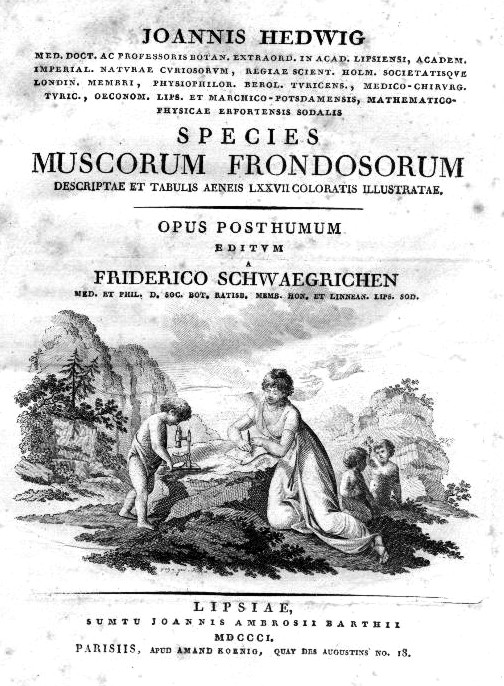
Cover of Species Muscorum Frondosorum

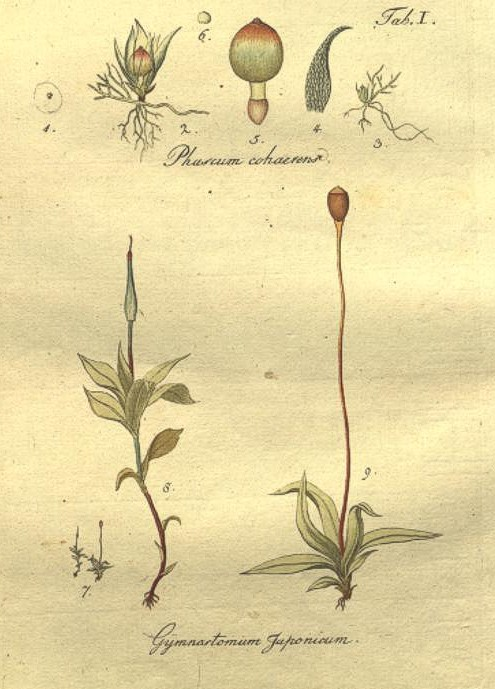
Plate from Species Muscorum Frondosorum

After receiving his degree, Hedwig worked as a physician for the next twenty years. When he was not granted a license to practice in Transylvania with his Leipzig degree, he worked as a general practitioner in Chemnitz. It was during this time when he first pursued botany as a hobby. He would routinely collect samples in the morning before work, then study his accumulation in the evening. He also was gifted a microscope and a small library, courtesy of Johann Christian Daniel von Schreber.

Hedwig was very skilled at both microscopy and biological illustration. He was able to identify and illustrate moss antheridia, archegonia and male gametes. He directly observed the germination of spores and formation of the protonema. He was less successful with other sporophytes, being unable to determine the life cycles of ferns or fungi, but he did make useful observations on the algae Chara and Spirogyra and he made it clear that he was not the first to get new plants from sowing the spores of mosses, David Meese having done it before him.

In 1781, he moved to Leipzig, where he worked as a doctor at the city hospital. It was here that he published his first major work, the two volume Fundamentum historiae naturalis muscorum frondosorum in 1782. In 1786, he was hired as an associate professor of medicine at the University of Leipzig. In 1789, he became a professor of botany and director of the botanical garden at the school. In April 1788, he was invited to be a Fellow of the Royal Society. In 1790, he became a foreign member of the Royal Swedish Academy of Sciences. In 1792, he was elected a member of the Academy of Sciences Leopoldina.

His chief work, Species muscorum frondosorum, was published posthumously in 1801. It describes nearly all the moss species then known, and is the starting point for nomenclature of all mosses, except for the Sphagnum group.

== Legacy ==
Hedwig was the father of the botanist Romanus Adolf Hedwig. He was also the father-in-law of Christian Daniel Beck and grandfather of Johann Ludwig Wilhelm Beck.

Today, Hedwig is commemorated both by the moss genus Hedwigia as well as the peer-reviewed journal Nova Hedwigia. In appreciation of Hedwig's achievements, the International Association of Bryologists awards the Hedwig Medal to scientists for extraordinary contributions in the field of Bryology.

Hedwig's personal herbarium was auctioned off in 1810, but it was largely acquired by the Botanical Garden of Geneva, where the collection is still located today.

== Selected publications ==
- Fundamenta historiae naturalis muscorum: concernens etc. Apud S.L. Crusium. 1782.
- Hedwig, Johann (1792). Descriptio et adumbratio microscopico-analytica muscorum frondosorum nec non aliorum vegetantium e classe cryptogamica Linnaei novorum dubiisque vexatorum.
- Sammlung seiner zerstreuten Abhandlungen und Beobachtungen über botanisch-ökonomische Gegenstände. Crusius. 1793.
- Theoria generationis et fructificationis plantarum cryptogamicarum (in Latin). Leipzig: Christoph Gottlob Breitkopf & Gottfried Christoph Härtel. 1798.
- Filicum genera et species. recentiori methodo accomonodatae ... iconibusque illustratae a Romano Adolpho filio. Schaefer. 1799.
- Species muscorum frondosorum, descriptae et tabulis aeneis LXXVII coloratis illustratae. sumtu Joannis Ambrosii Barthii. 1801.

=== Editions ===
- Descriptio et adumbratio microscopico-analytica muscorum frondosorum nec non aliorum vegetantium a classe cryptogamica Linnaei (in Latin). Vol. 1. Leipzig: Johann Gottfried Müller. 1787.
  - Descriptio et adumbratio microscopico-analytica muscorum frondosorum nec non aliorum vegetantium a classe cryptogamica Linnaei (in Latin). Vol. 2. Leipzig: Johann Gottfried Müller. 1789.
  - Descriptio et adumbratio microscopico-analytica muscorum frondosorum nec non aliorum vegetantium a classe cryptogamica Linnaei (in Latin). Vol. 4. Leipzig: Johann Friedrich (2.) Gleditsch, Erben. 1797.
