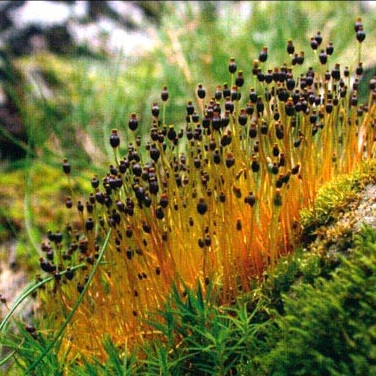
- Splachnum sphaericum

Scientific classification
- Kingdom: Plantae
- Division: Bryophyta
- Class: Bryopsida
- Subclass: Bryidae
- Superorder: Bryanae
- Order: Splachnales
- Family: Splachnaceae; Grev. & Arn.

Genera
- Aplodon; Moseniella; Splachnum; Tayloria; Tetraplodon; Voitia

= Splachnaceae =

Splachnaceae Temporal range: Middle Jurassic–Recent

Family of mosses

Splachnaceae is a family of mosses, containing around 70 species in 6 genera. Around half of those species are entomophilous, using insects to disperse their spores, a characteristic found in no other seedless land plants.

Many species in this family are coprophilous, growing exclusively on animal faeces or carrion. For this reason, certain genera such as Splachnum Hedw. are often referred to as dung mosses.

== Description ==
=== Gametophyte ===
Mosses in this family are predominantly dioicous (archegonia and antheridia on separate individuals); although exceptions are known such as S. pensylvanicum which is monoicous. The gametophyte is always acrocarpous (standing up), with green-yellow to reddish leaves/stems, and most often under 5 cm in height. Stems stand vertically and when cross-sectioned, can be seen to have a well-defined central strand. Large parenchymatous cells surround the central strand with thin, red to orange cell walls. Cortical cells are often more red in color, being narrow and thick-walled. Axillary hairs may be present along the stem, although axillary branches are infrequent. Rhizoids are dark brown or red and may be papillose.

Female plants are more robust than male plants; having spreading, ovate to lanceolate leaves that are moderately crisped when dry. Leaf distribution may be homogenous or may become larger/denser near the apex of the stem. Leaves may be serrate (finely toothed) on the edges, and possess a single costa that often ends before the apex. Laminal cells are thin-walled, being more rectangular towards the base and hexagonal at the apex. Perichaetial leaves are often larger, but similar in structure to the other leaves on the stem.

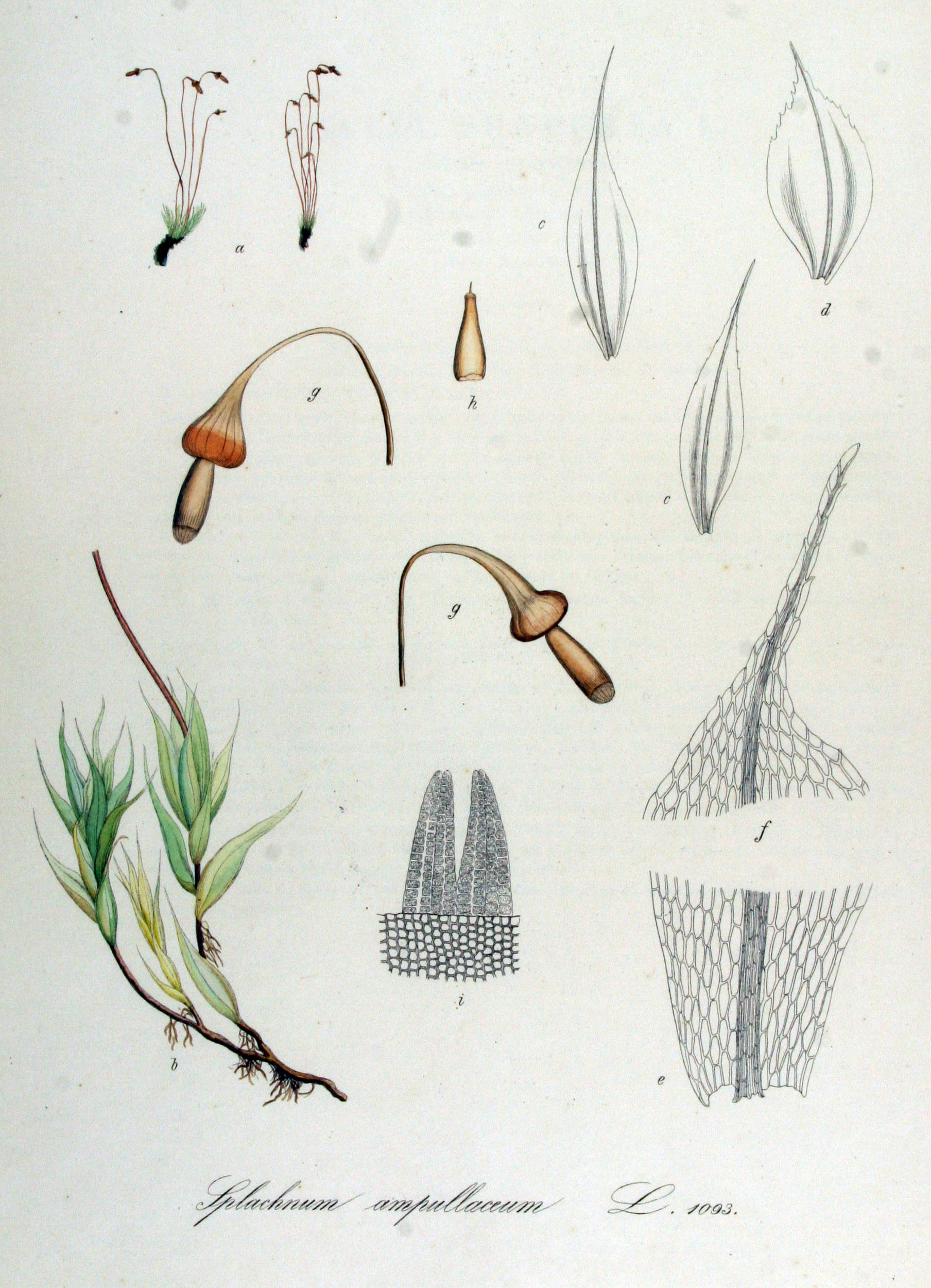
Illustration of the sporophytic and gametophytic stages of Splachnum ampullaceum

Male plants are more slender, with a looser leaf distribution. Leaves differ in size and differentiation towards the apex of the stem forming an often-bulbous perigonia. Perigonial leaves are strongly differentiated, being ovate and tapering to a long tip. The perigonium is terminal, and will often harbour paraphyses.

==== Early stages ====
Like other mosses, gametophytes start as a haploid spore which quickly germinates to become a uniseriate protonema. This protonema serves members of Splachnaceae by quickly colonizing its preferred substrate, developing in three stages: the chloronema, caulonema, and finally the leafy gametophore.

===== Spores =====
Unicellular spores are produced through meiosis by the sporophyte. In Splachnaceae, they are often small and sticky for easy insect dispersal. Spores are sometimes dispersed in clusters.

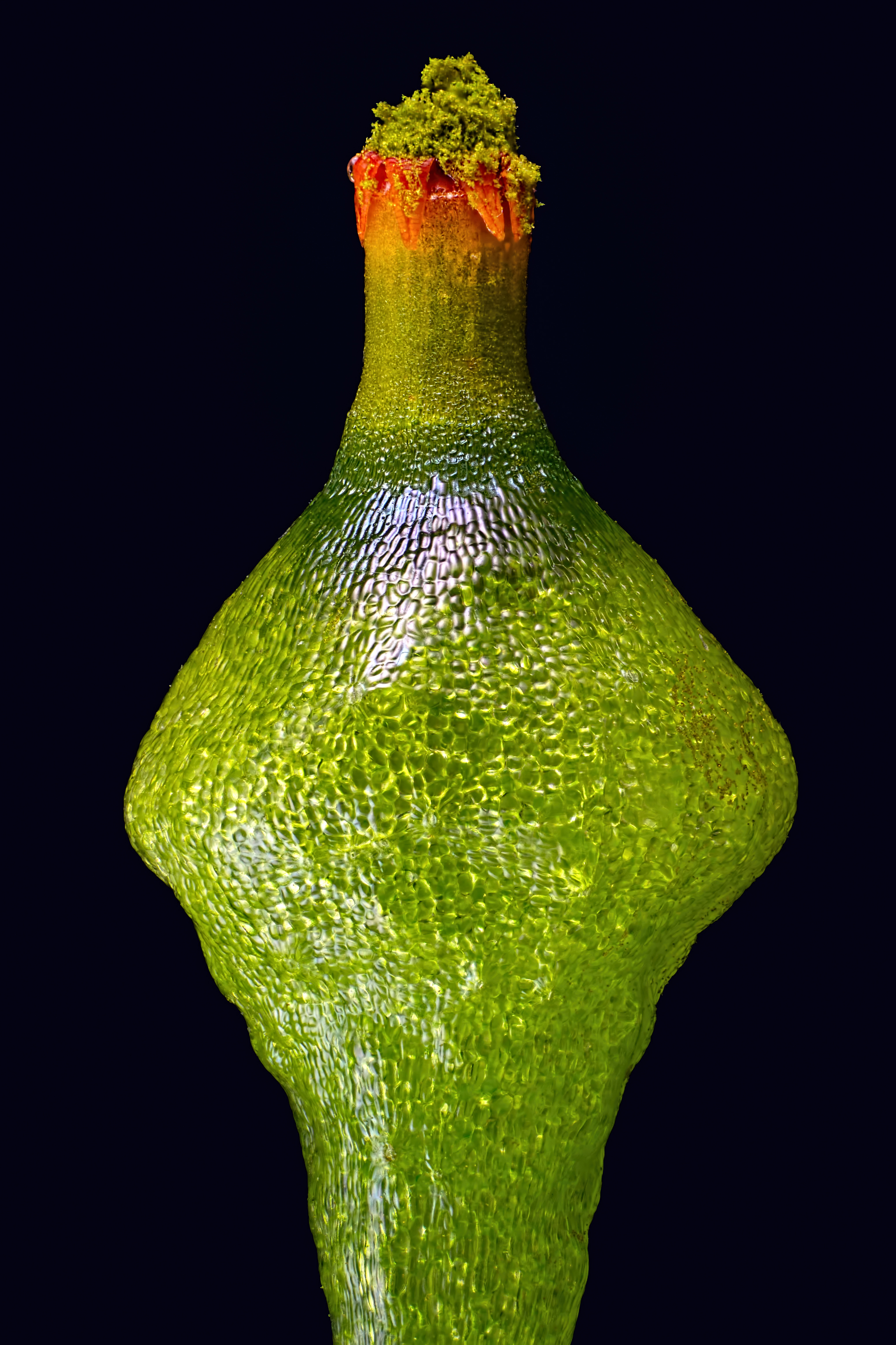
Sporangium of Splachnum ampullaceum, showing the exaggerated hypophysis.

===== Chloronema =====
The chloronema is the earliest stage of protonema, having unique features such as irregular branching, round chloroplasts, and transverse crosswalls. There is no budding at this stage.

===== Caulonema =====
The caulonema is the secondary stage of protonema. It is branched regularly, has spindle-shaped chloroplasts, and oblique crosswalls. At this stage, budding begins.

=== Sporophyte ===
Many species in this family have very exaggerated sporophytes that are highly adapted for their specific ecological relationships.

The seta of Splachnaceae is usually elongate and erect, with a defined central strand. The sporangium is highly variable in shape. In many species, the middle of the sporophyte (hypophysis/apophysis) may be highly inflated or flared in order to attract insects. Above this is a shorter "urn" which is the same colour, and harbours a bluntly conical or convex operculum on top; of which the annulus is poorly developed. A single peristome is present, with 16 variably pigmented teeth (exostome usually consists of 8 teeth). Stomata are often abundant on the sporangium.

A haploid calyptra, composed of tissue from the gametophyte, may be present on the sporophyte; it being nearly always mitrate (shaped like a bishop's cap) and smooth.

== Taxonomy ==
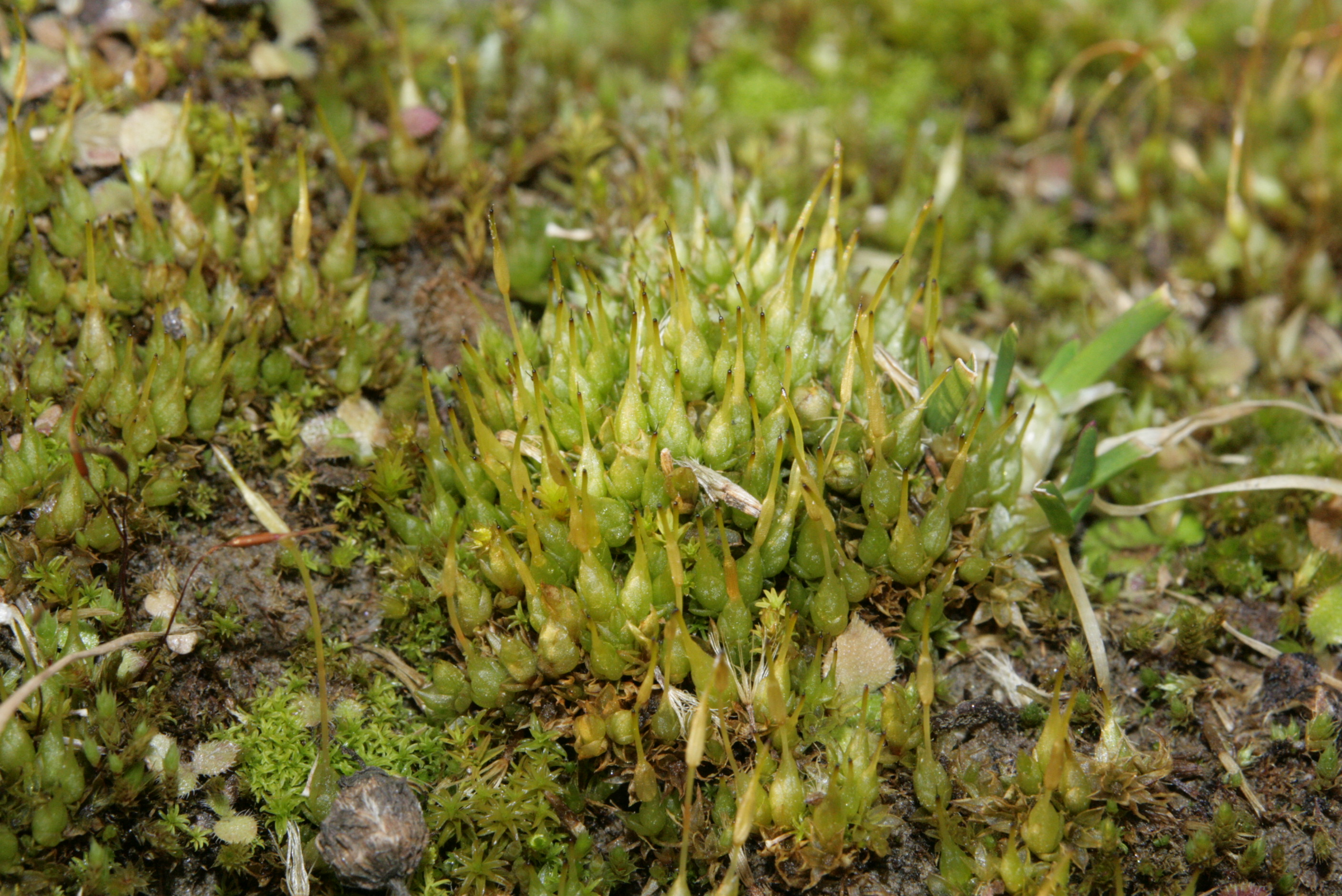
Funaria hygrometrica, which may superficially resemble species in Splachnaceae.

Splachnaceae currently resides in the order Splachnales (M. Fleisch.) Ochyra; which is further nestled within the class Bryopsida. It comprises 6 genera and approximately 73 species. The type genus is Splachnum Hedw.

Three subfamilies have been named within the Splachnaceae.

Splachnoideae (Aplodon, Splachnum, Tetraplodon) can be distinguished by their highly differentiated and often inflated hypophysis. All species are coprophilous and entomophilous excluding T. paradoxus, which is only coprophilous. Genera are distinguished by their peristome teeth.

Voitioideae (Voitia) is characterized by the absence of a differentiated line of dehiscence on the sporangium (cleistocarpy). Spore dispersal is only achieved following the decay of the sporangial wall. Species in this subfamily are coprophilous but not entomophilous.

Taylorioideae (Moseniella, Tayloria) is the most polymorphic subfamily, with species that inhabit many different niches.

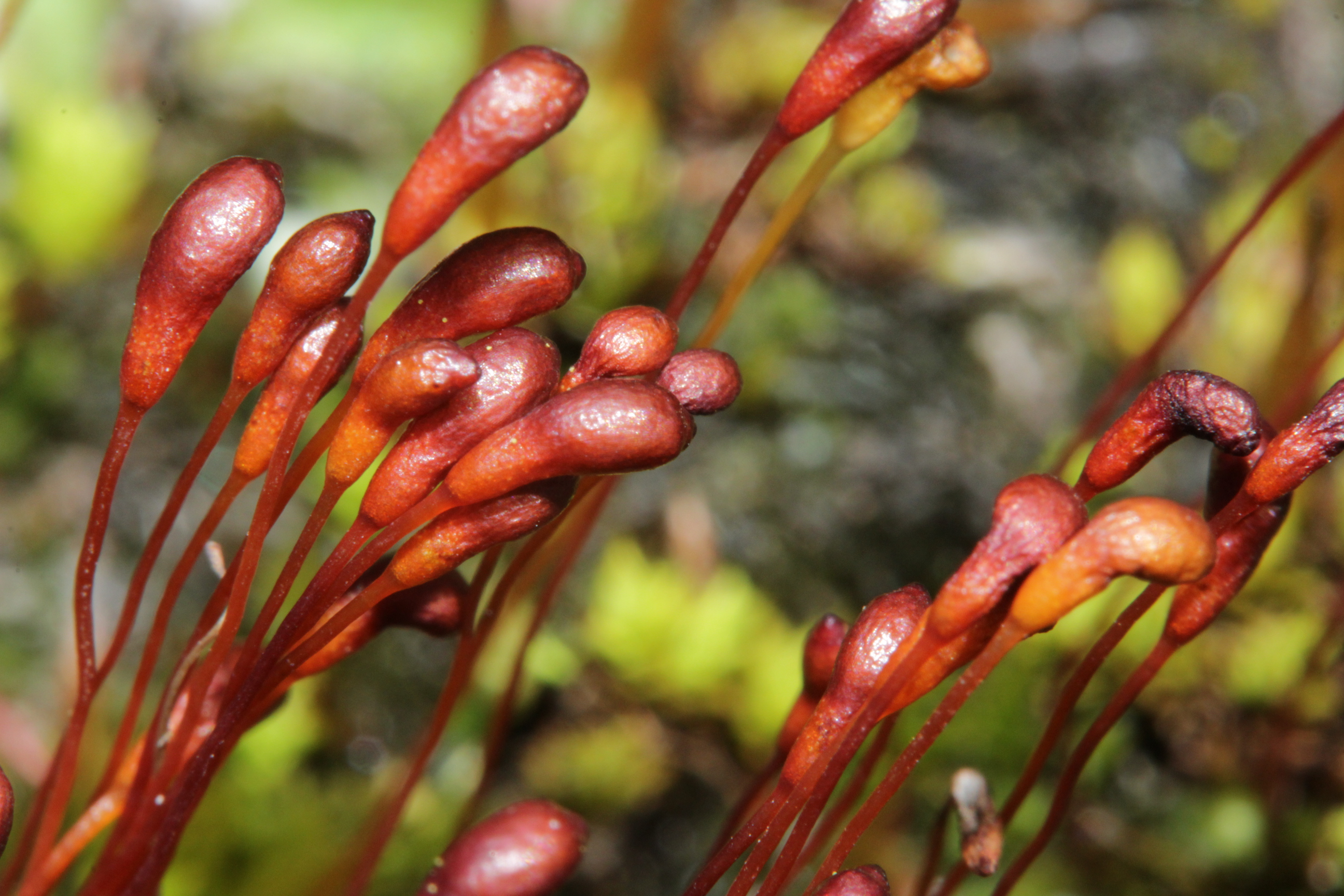
Sporophytes of Meesia uliginosa, of which members of Splachnaceae are distantly related to.

=== List of genera ===
- Aplodon R. Br.
- Moseniella Broth.
- Splachnum Hedw. (e.g. Splachnum sphaericum)
- Tayloria Hook.
- Tetraplodon Bruch & Schimp.
- Voitia Hornsch.

Members of Splachnaceae may superficially resemble those of Funariaceae, sharing soft textured and similarly shaped leaves. However, recent phylogenetic studies do not support this relationship and instead point to the Splachnaceae as being more closely related to the Meesiaceae rather than to the Funariaceae as was thought. Although members of both Splachnaceae and Meesiaceae grow in similar moist habitats such as peatlands, they differ in the structure of the sporangium; where Splachnaceae possess an erect sporangium with a mitrate calyptra and Meesiaceae possess a curved sporangium with a cucullate (hood shaped) calyptra.

Kulindobryum from the Middle Jurassic Ukureyskaya Formation of Russia, associated with dinosaur skeletons of the genus Kulindadromeus, closely resembles Tayloria, and may be a member of the family.

== Distribution and habitat ==
Members of Splachnaceae are found throughout the world; although they are distributed predominantly in temperate and cold regions of the northern and southern hemispheres, as well as in high altitude regions of the neotropics. Some genera, such as Moseniella Broth., are restricted to tropical latitudes; although this is uncommon. There is an overwhelming preference for members of this family to inhabit bogs and fens.

Due to their ecological preference for decaying animal matter, members of Splachnaceae are considered annual-shuttles, and populations cannot be sustained over long periods of time. Furthermore, such habitats are extremely discontinuous as they depend on the production and decay of animal matter within a specific climatic and vegetational zone. For these reasons, Splachnaceae are mostly found in regions where the temperature is cold enough to slow the rapid decay of animal matter on which they inhabit.

Although not all species are restricted to habitats associated with decaying animal matter, they have nonetheless been observed to flourish in nitrogen-rich substrates.

== Ecological relationships and life cycle ==
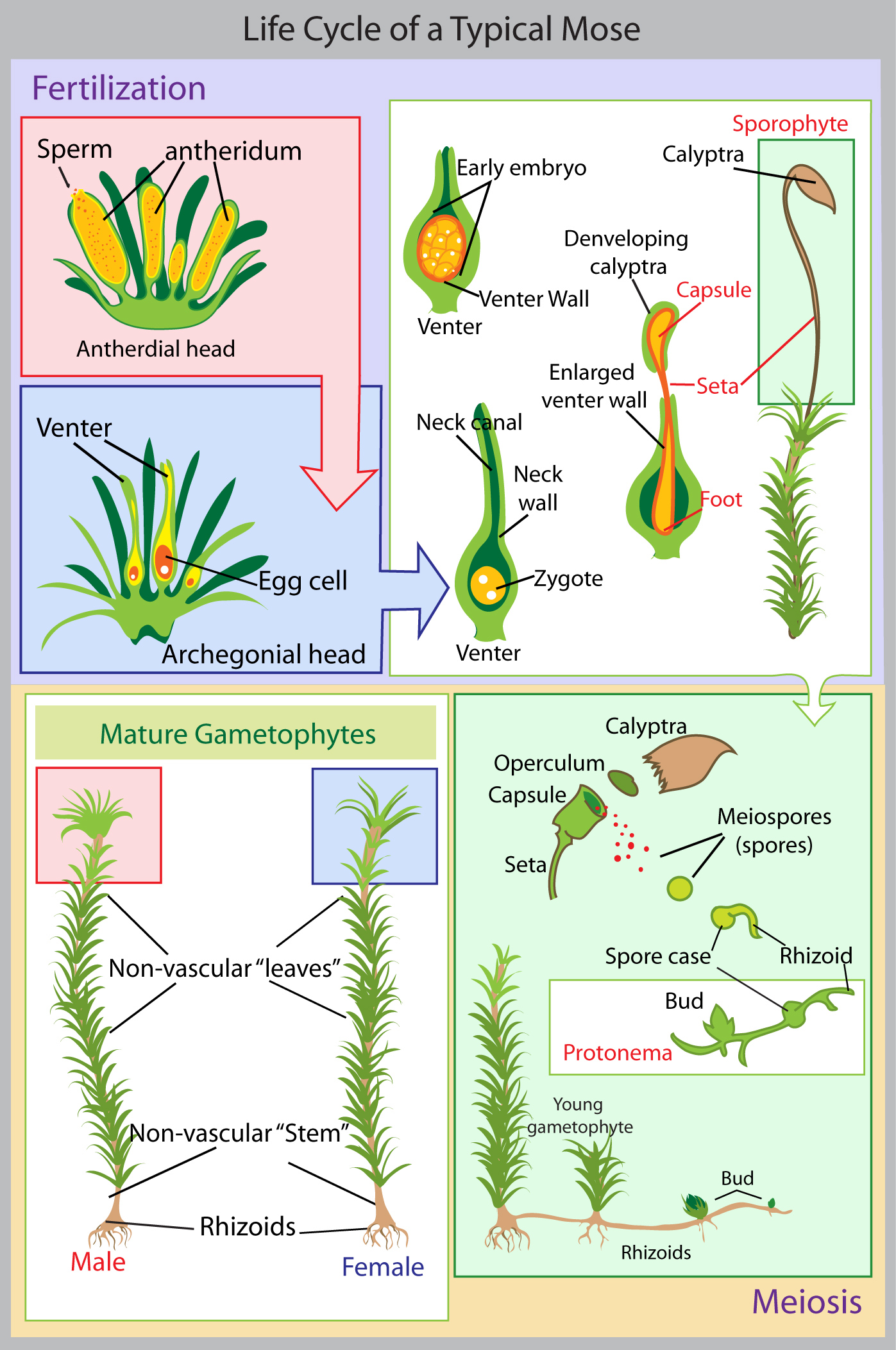
Life cycle of a bryophyte

=== Entomophily ===
Splachnaceae is the only family of bryophytes in which entomophily has been observed. Entomophily is especially common within the genera Splachnum and Tayloria, as well as having been documented in the species Aplodon wormskioldii. Entomophilous species are in particular, noted for their brightly coloured and often scented sporophytes. These sporophyte attract insects, most notably flies of the family Scathophagidae, also known as dung flies. Three types of adaptations have been recorded for entomophily: (1) coprophily, (2) morphological adaptations and (3) chemical adaptations.

In many instances, the specific colours, shapes, and odours produced by sporophytes have been shown to have species-specific relationships to the flies that visit them. This suggests that the Splachnaceae co-exist through signal diversification, which allows different species to avoid competition for spore-dispersal within a limited range. This is akin to the signal diversification strategies observed in flowering plants, which reduce competition for pollinators. Competition between species is nonetheless strong, with reduced rates of growth having been observed under experimental conditions where two species are grown in close proximity.

==== Morphological adaptations ====
Morphological adaptations of the family Splachnaceae include the enlarged, often inflated hypophysis, the coloured sporangium/upper region of the seta, and hygroscopic movements of the peristome which help spores to leave. As well, the small spore size and stickiness helps spores to be dispersed in clumps on the hairs of insects.

==== Chemical adaptations ====
Chemical adaptations of the Splachnaceae include the odours produced and released by the sporophytes. In the sporophytes of entomophilous species, volatile compounds, including organic acids and octane derivatives, have been isolated. These are in especially high concentration within the hypophysis. Such chemoattractants are most often secreted through the stomata of the apophysis; and are absent throughout the seta as well as the gametophyte.

Flies of the family Scathophagidae have been observed to benefit from an increase in copulatory success in relation to these compounds.

Chemical adaptations for entomophily in the Splachnaceae can also be thought of as a type of chemical mimicry, with many scents being produced in order to mimic the faecal/carrion odours enjoyed by flies. The odours produced in the Splachnaceae have also been compared to those produced by plants in the angiosperm families Rafflesiaceae and Araceae, all of which are pollinated by flies.

=== Coprophily ===
Almost all species within Splachnaceae are coprophilus to some extent, meaning that they grow on decaying animal matter. This includes the dung of herbivorous mammals, skeletal remains, antlers, the stomach pellets of predatory birds, and corpses.

In past cultivation experiments, it was observed that the protonema and shoots of species such as Splachnum sphaericum have a greater tolerance for substrates of high nitrogen content than other arctic bryophytes. Additionally, results indicated that the tissues of species in Splachnaceae reflect the nutrient content of their chosen substrata; being much higher in nitrogen, phosphorus, and calcium compared to other bryophytes. For these species, there is selective advantage to growing on such nutrient concentrated substrates.

=== Life cycle ===
Like all other bryophytes, species in the family Splachnaceae complete their life cycle in two generations, also known as the alternation of heteromorphic generations. For mosses, the dominant stage is the haploid gametophyte, which supports and nourishes the diploid sporophyte through an attachment known as the foot.

The gametophyte stage starts with the production of a haploid spore, which must first be dispersed onto suitable habitat (often by wind or by insect in Splachnaceae). From here, the spore will germinate, and following a protonematal stage, develop into a leafy gametophyte. Following this, male and female organs called the antheridia and archegonia will produce sperm and eggs through mitosis. If fertilization is successful, a diploid zygote will form, eventually developing into a dependent sporophyte, which will produce the following generation of spores.

Due to the often short-lived nature of their habitat, members of Splachnaceae do not usually engage in asexual reproduction.

== Botanical history ==
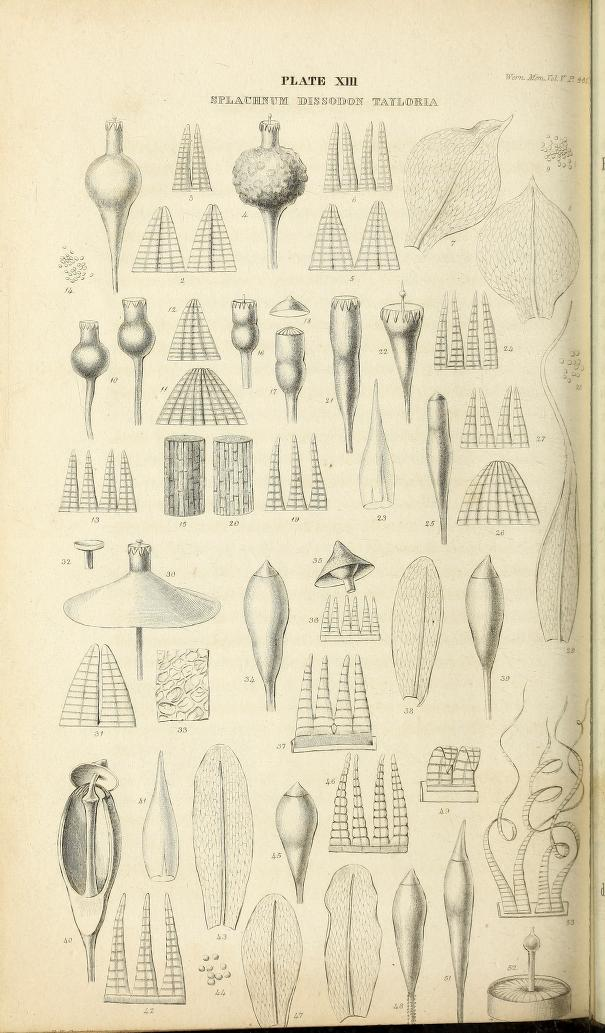
Plate depicting various species in the family Splachnaceae from its original publication.

Although the first records of these mosses in herbaria are uncertain, Splachnaceae was first published in 1824 (Memoirs of the Wernerian Natural History Society 5: 442. 1824.) by Robert Kaye Greville and George Arnott Walker.

The type genus of Splachnaceae is Splachnum Hedw., of which the family was named after. It was first described in 1801 in Species Muscorum Frondosorum (51–56, pl. 8.), with the type specimen having been described in latin (Splachnum vasculosum Hedw.).

=== Synonyms ===
- Voitiaceae Schimp.

Authors: Schimper, Wilhelm Philipp

Published In: Corollarium Bryologiae Europaeae 5. 1856. (Coroll. Bryol. Eur.)

=== Evolutionary history ===
Entomophily is a notable adaptation that, as in flowering plants, has helped species in Splachnaceae to rapidly diversify within a short evolutionary timeframe. According to recent phylogenetic studies, the morphological adaptations of many species within Splachnaceae have evolved following, rather than having triggered, transitions to a coprophilous and entomophilous habit; suggesting that visual and olfactory signaling of insects has evolved multiple times in the Splachnaceae.
