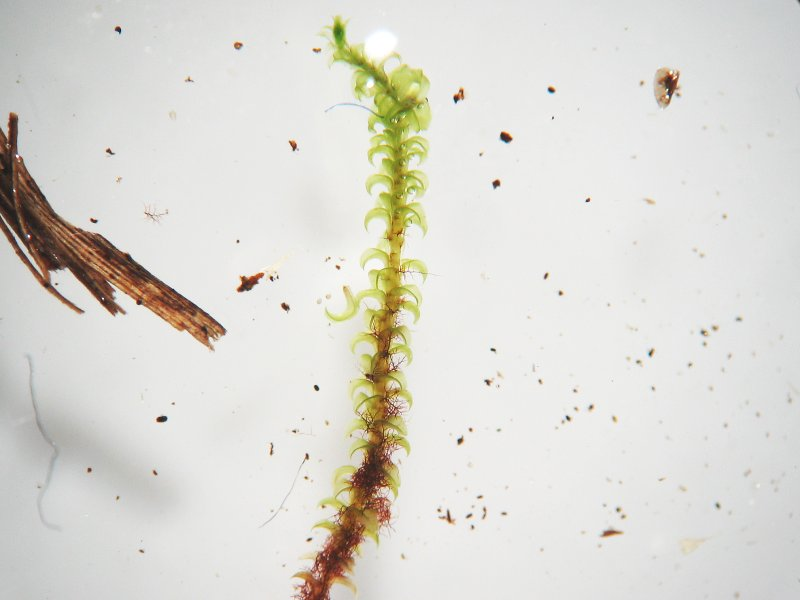
- Paludella squarrosa

Scientific classification
- Kingdom: Plantae
- Division: Bryophyta
- Class: Bryopsida
- Subclass: Bryidae
- Order: Splachnales
- Family: Meesiaceae

= Meesiaceae =

Family of mosses

Meesiaceae is a family of mosses belonging to the order Splachnales.

Genera:

- Amblyodon P.Beauv.
- Diplocomium F.Web. & D.Mohr
- Meesia Hedw.
- Neomeesia Deguchi
- Paludella Ehrh. ex Brid.
