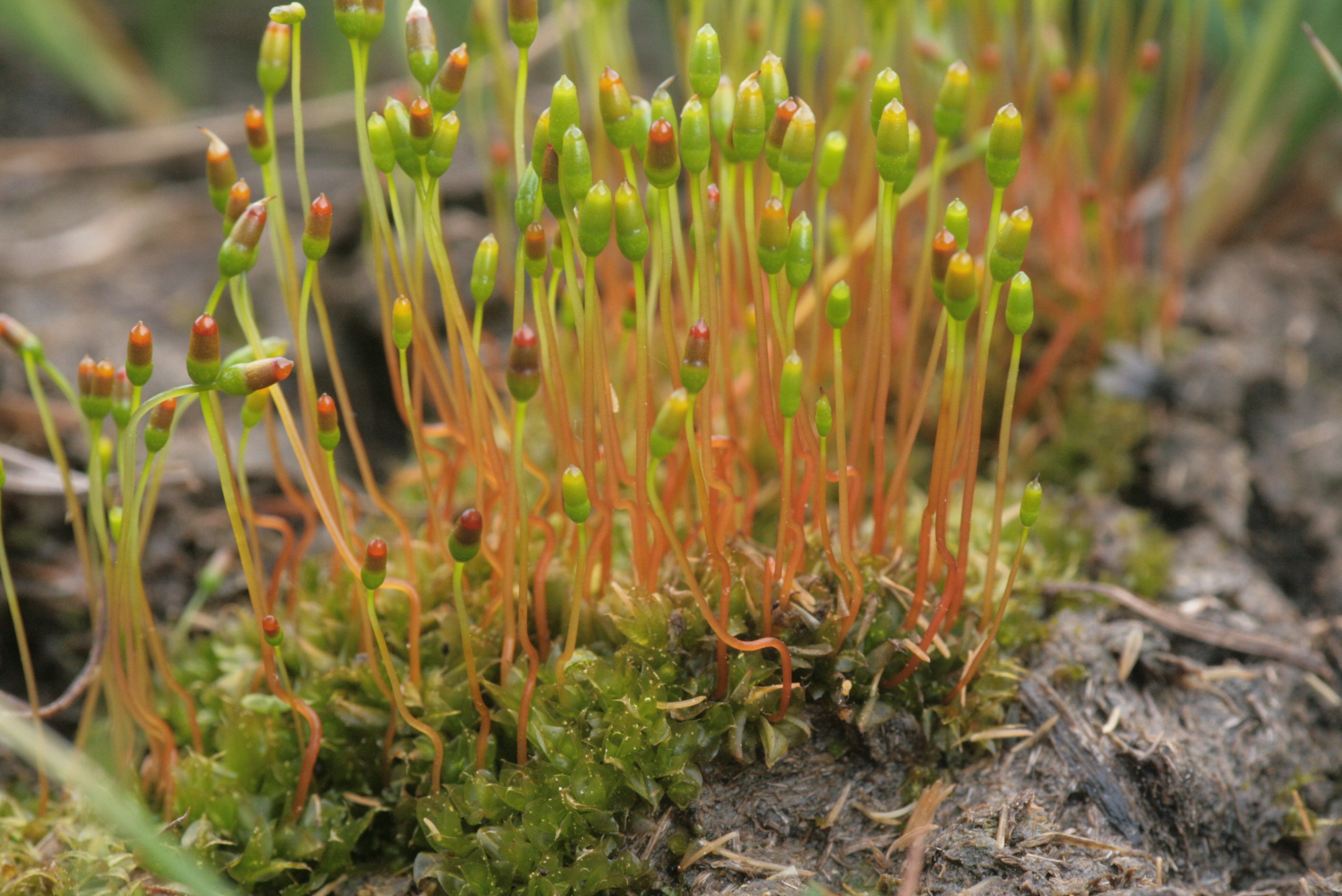
- Splachnum sphaericum

Scientific classification
- Kingdom: Plantae
- Division: Bryophyta
- Class: Bryopsida
- Subclass: Bryidae
- Superorder: Bryanae
- Order: Splachnales

Families
- Meesiaceae; Splachnaceae

= Splachnales =

Order of mosses

Splachnales is an order of Bryophyta or leafy mosses. Along with Orthotrichales, Hedwigiales, and Bryales, it forms the superorder Bryananae.
