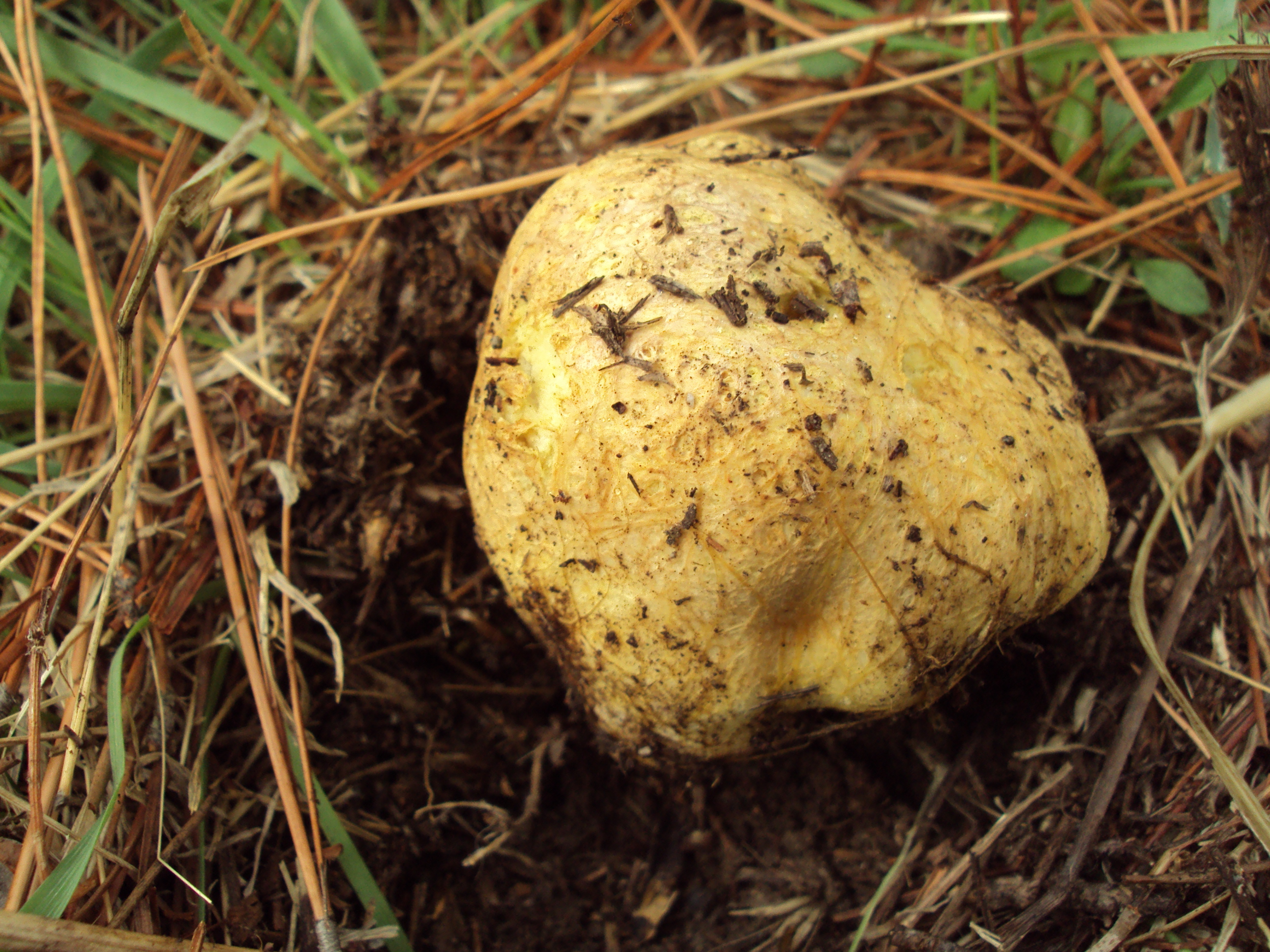

Scientific classification
- Domain: Eukaryota
- Kingdom: Fungi
- Division: Basidiomycota
- Class: Agaricomycetes
- Order: Boletales
- Family: Rhizopogonaceae
- Genus: Rhizopogon
- Species: R. occidentalis

Binomial name
- Rhizopogon occidentalis Zeller & C.W.Dodge (1918)

= Rhizopogon occidentalis =

Species of fungus

Rhizopogon occidentalis is an ectomycorrhizal fungus in the family Rhizopogonaceae of the Basidiomycota. It occurs most commonly in western North America in association with two-needle and three-needle pine hosts. They are false truffles with fruiting bodies that are yellow on the surface and pale yellow inside. Their edibility is disputed.

== Taxonomy ==
Rhizopogon occidentalis was first described by Sanford Myron Zeller and Carroll William Dodge in 1918 from collections made in Moscow, Idaho; Klickitat Co. and Bingen, Washington; Between Hood River and Mosier, Oregon; and Pacific Grove, California. The Latin name occidentalis means western, likely in reference to the species' western North American distribution. It is one of the species commonly known as a false truffle due to the shape and location of its fruiting body.

== Description ==
Their fruiting bodies (basidiocarps) are truffle-like and 1–4 centimetres (1/2–1 1/2 in) in diameter when dried, with a yellow 60–240 μm-thick peridium and pale yellow gleba. These structures stain reddish with injury Their basidia are clavate and contain 6 or 8 spores. The spores are smooth, ellipsoidal and 7–9 by 3–5 um. They have white hyphae 2–5 mm in width and 5–25 um in length with simple dichotomous branching and thick rhizomorphs. They lack clamp connections and deposits of what is thought to be calcium oxalate found on the mantles of some other members of their genus.

=== Similar species ===
Several members of the genus can appear very similar, e.g. R. ochraceorubens and R. parksii.

== Habitat and distribution ==
They are distributed primarily across western North America from September to December. They colonize trees in sandy soils namely in coastal dunes and montane forests as well as interior pine forests.

== Ecology ==
They are ectomycorrhizal mutualists primarily with two and three needle pines though they are also capable of forming ectomycorrhizal relationships with Sitka spruce. Studies and observations of their interactions with bishop pine suggest they are most competitive in newly forested or areas with recent disturbance (such as fire) due their strong priority effect, and are often outcompeted as forests mature. Early establishment after fire may also be aided by its spores greater heat resistance relative to some cooccurring ectomycorrhizal species.

Their fruiting bodies grow underground and are eaten by small mammals, which disperse their spores. Once dispersed, spores can remain dormant for more than four years.

== Uses ==
=== Edibility ===
The edibility of this species is disputed. One source describes it as inedible while others describe it as having a mild odor and taste

=== Lumber industry ===
Traits like its speed of colonization and its low likelihood of long term establishment make the species potentially commercially useful in the lumber industry.
