= Rhizopogon parvisporus =

Scientific classification
- Domain: Eukaryota
- Kingdom: Fungi
- Division: Basidiomycota
- Class: Agaricomycetes
- Order: Boletales
- Family: Rhizopogonaceae
- Genus: Rhizopogon
- Species: R. parvisporus

Binomial name
- Rhizopogon parvisporus Bowerman (1962)

Species of fungus

Rhizopogon parvisporus is a small, truffle-like fungus in the family Rhizopogonaceae. Found in Canada, it was described as new to science in 1962 by Constance Bowerman, from collections made in Newfoundland.

== Description ==
The roughly spherical to irregularly shaped fruitbodies of the fungus measure 10–21 mm (0.4–0.8 in) in diameter when fresh, although they tend to shrink when dry. They have a hard, wrinkled surface that is yellowish brown or lighter in color. The peridium is 300–570 μm thick. The spores have the shape of narrow ellipsoids, and rarely exceed 5 μm in length. They often contain two oil droplets, but occasionally have three or four.

== Habitat and distribution ==
The fungus is only known from Fort Smith (Northwest Territories), and Newfoundland. In the former location, it was found along a riverbank in spruce woods, while in the latter it grew on mossy slopes in thickets of alder and fir.
