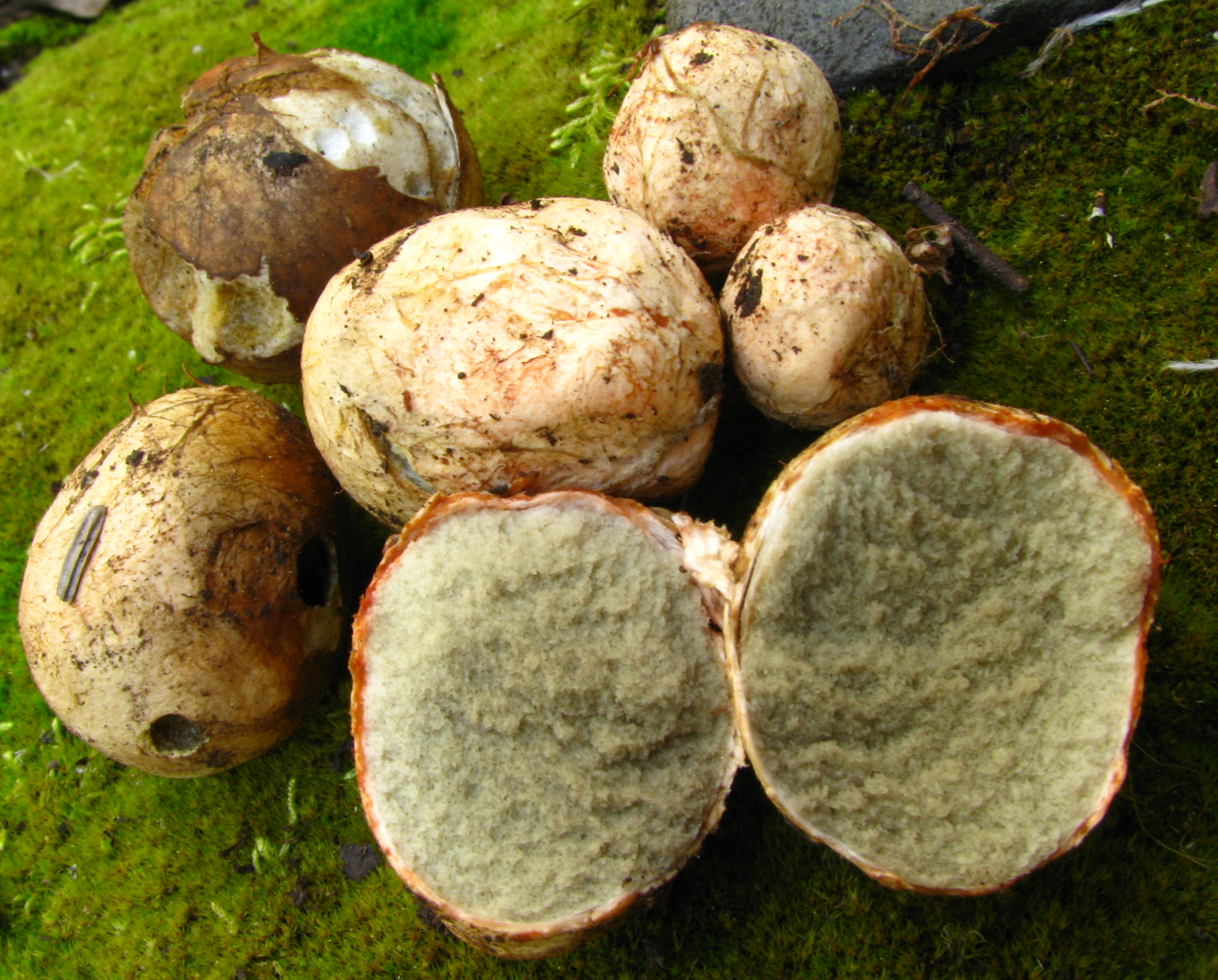

Scientific classification
- Domain: Eukaryota
- Kingdom: Fungi
- Division: Basidiomycota
- Class: Agaricomycetes
- Order: Boletales
- Family: Rhizopogonaceae
- Genus: Rhizopogon
- Species: R. evadens

Binomial name
- Rhizopogon evadens A.H.Sm. (1966)

Synonyms
- Rhizopogon evadens var. subalpinus A.H.Sm. (1966)

= Rhizopogon evadens =

Species of fungus

Rhizopogon evadens is a truffle-like fungus in the family Rhizopogonaceae. Found in North America, it was described as new to science by American mycologist Alexander H. Smith in 1966. The fungus produces roundish to irregularly shaped fruitbodies measuring 2–5 cm (0.8–2.0 in) in diameter, with irregular lobes, wrinkles and depressions on the surface. The peridium (outer tissue layer of the fruitbody) is whitish with light yellow to brown stains, and bruises red. The fungus has an unpleasant odor and a taste described as "metallic". Typical tree associates include pine, Douglas fir, and hemlock. Initially white, the gleba (the interior contents) turn olive to olive-brown in maturity, with the contents developing a gelatinous consistency. The smooth spores of R. evadens are narrowly ellipsoid in shape, and measure 6–8 by 2–2.3 μm.
