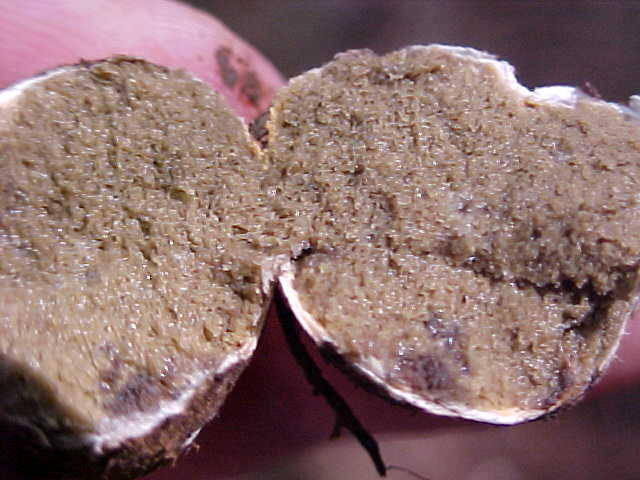

Scientific classification
- Domain: Eukaryota
- Kingdom: Fungi
- Division: Basidiomycota
- Class: Agaricomycetes
- Order: Boletales
- Family: Rhizopogonaceae
- Genus: Rhizopogon
- Species: R. vinicolor

Binomial name
- Rhizopogon vinicolor A.H.Sm. (1966)

= Rhizopogon vinicolor =

Species of fungus

Rhizopogon vinicolor is a species complex of ectomycorrhizal fungus which forms a mutualistic relationship with the Douglas-fir (Pseudotsuga spp.). The species was first described scientifically by American mycologist Alexander H. Smith in 1966.

== Taxonomy ==
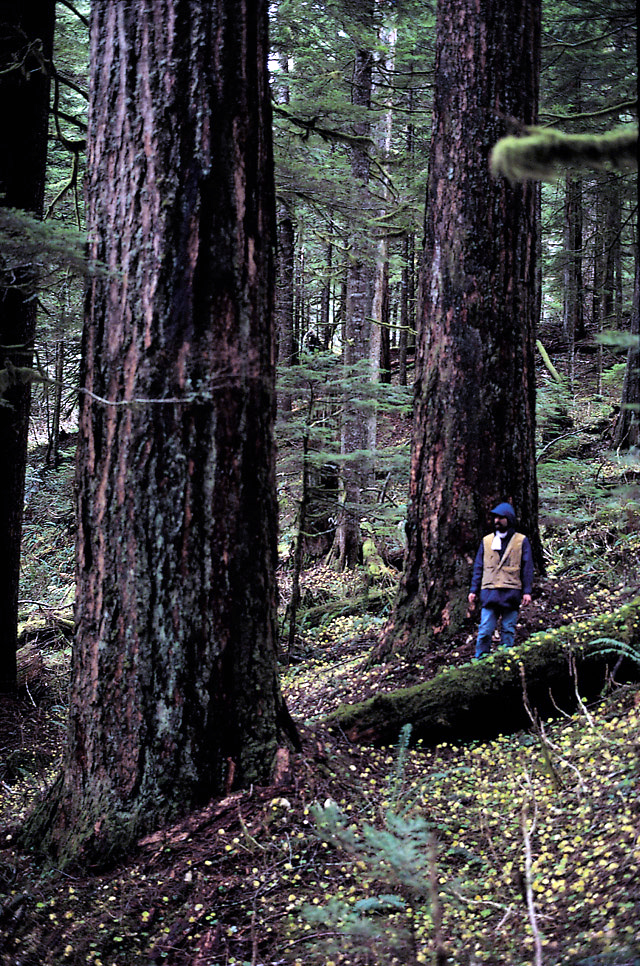
Old growth Douglas-firs

A number of species of Rhizopogon are morphologically similar and they are collectively known as the R. vinicolor species complex. A phylogenetic investigation of R. vinicolor, R. diabolicus, R. ochraceisporus, R. parvulus and R. versiculosus was published in 2002. It was determined that they separated into two distinct clades, R. vinicolor and R. versiculosus.

== Characteristics ==
The fruit bodies of R. vinicolor are produced underground. They are 10 to 33 millimetres (0.4 to 1.3 in) in diameter, rounded or irregularly shaped, of a dirty white colour, later red, and with a few rhizomorphs at the base. The peridium is a single layer, becoming wine-red when exposed. The gleba is firm and buff coloured, darkening with age, with small labyrinthine locules. The trama are well-filled with basidiospores. These are elliptical to ovoid, 5–9 × 3–5 μm, do not have a septum and are smooth and hyaline. The mycelial cords are few in number or absent altogether.

== Ecology ==
This species forms a mutualistic relationship with coniferous trees. Although some authorities state that R. vinicolor associates exclusively with the Douglas-fir, others mention it being found in association with the ponderosa pine and other pines and firs. The trees benefit from the saprophytic fungus which makes nutrients available by breakdown of the leaf litter and rotting wood, while the fungus benefits from the trees' photosynthetic mechanisms which produce carbohydrates.

The western red-backed vole is one of a number of rodents that feed on the fruit bodies. The spores then pass through the vole's gut and are deposited in faecal pellets throughout its extensive burrows. The spores are still viable and this enables the fungus to spread and form associations with uninfected trees. It has been found that if a forest is clear cut and all the dead wood removed, R. vinicolor and other mycorrhiza stop fruiting, the vole population dies out and any newly planted trees fail to thrive.
