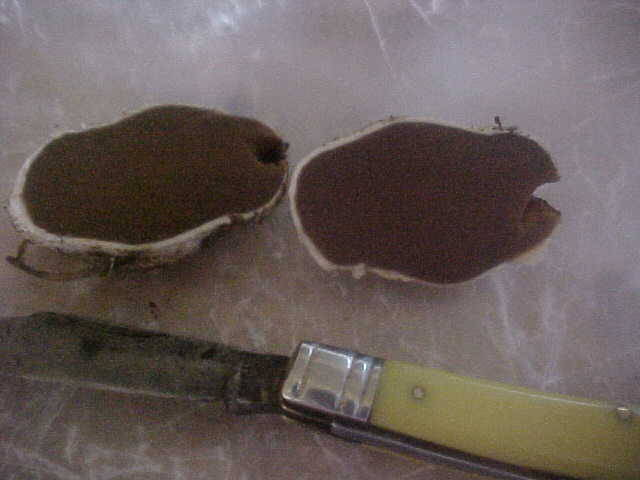

Scientific classification
- Domain: Eukaryota
- Kingdom: Fungi
- Division: Basidiomycota
- Class: Agaricomycetes
- Order: Boletales
- Family: Rhizopogonaceae
- Genus: Rhizopogon
- Species: R. subcaerulescens

Binomial name
- Rhizopogon subcaerulescens A.H.Sm. (1966)

= Rhizopogon subcaerulescens =

Species of fungus

Rhizopogon subcaerulescens is an ectomycorrhizal fungus used as a soil inoculant in agriculture and horticulture. The species was described by American mycologist Alexander H. Smith in a 1966 publication.
