= Saimyō-ji =

Saimyō-ji may refer to:

- Saimyō-ji (Kora), a Buddhist temple in Kora, Shiga Prefecture, Japan
- Saimyō-ji (Mashiko), a Buddhist temple in Mashiko, Tochigi Prefecture, Japan
