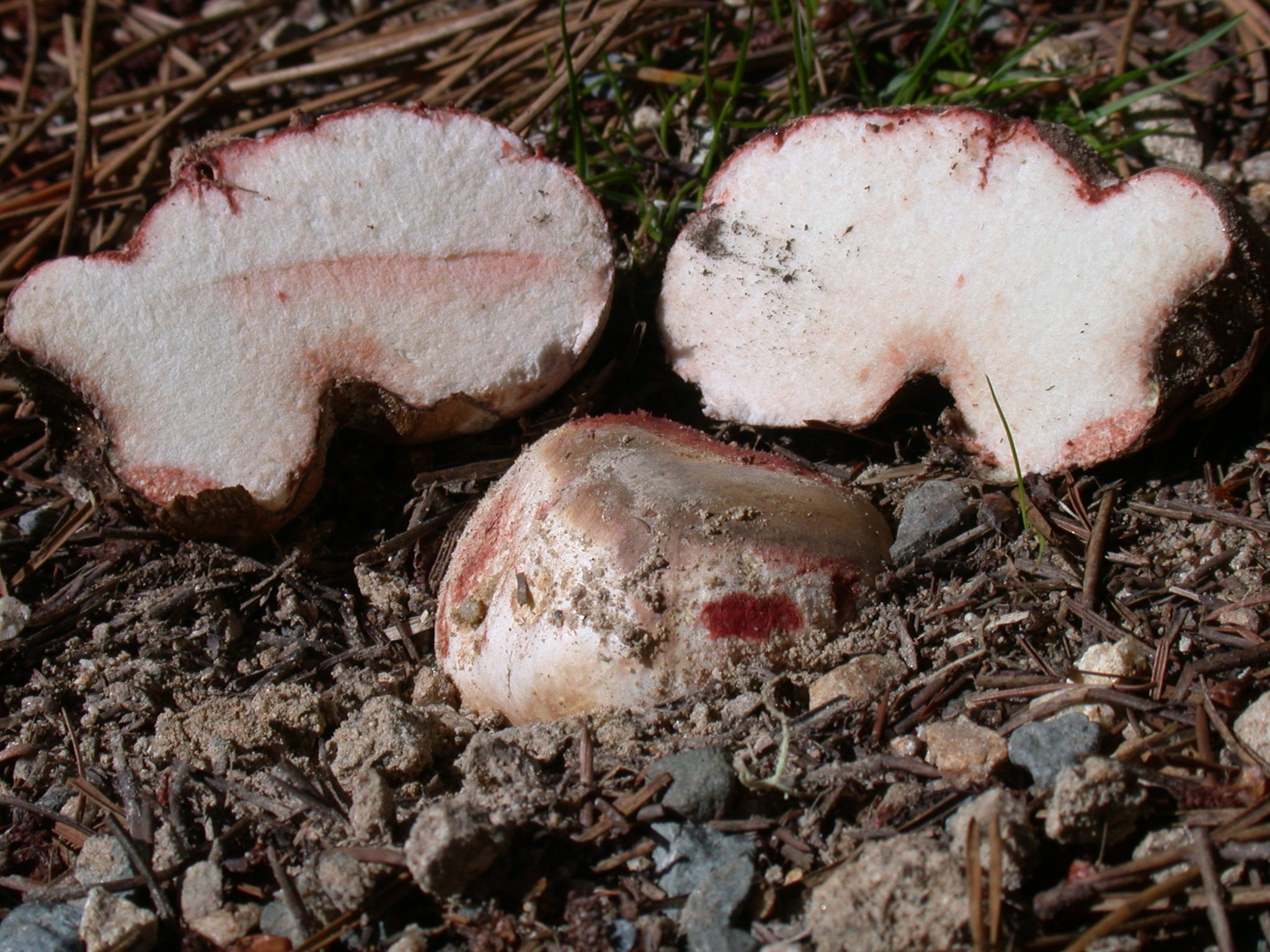
- Rhizopogon rubescens

Scientific classification
- Kingdom: Fungi
- Division: Basidiomycota
- Class: Agaricomycetes
- Order: Boletales
- Family: Rhizopogonaceae
- Genus: Rhizopogon; Fr. (1817)

Type species
- Rhizopogon luteolus Fr. & Nordholm (1817)

= Rhizopogon =

Genus of fungi

Rhizopogon
- Mycological characteristics
- Glebal hymenium
- No distinct cap
- Hymenium attachment is irregular or not applicable
- Lacks a stipe
- Spore print is white
- Ecology is saprotrophic
- Edibility is edible or choice

Rhizopogon is a genus of ectomycorrhizal basidiomycetes in the family Rhizopogonaceae. Species form hypogeous sporocarps commonly referred to as "false truffles". The general morphological characters of Rhizopogon sporocarps are a simplex or duplex peridium surrounding a loculate gleba that lacks a columnella. Basidiospores are produced upon basidia that are borne within the fungal hymenium that coats the interior surface of gleba locules. The peridium is often adorned with thick mycelial cords, also known as rhizomorphs, that attach the sporocarp to the surrounding substrate. The scientific name Rhizopogon is Greek for 'root' (Rhiz-) 'beard' (-pogon) and this name was given in reference to the rhizomorphs found on sporocarps of many species.

Rhizopogon species are primarily found in ectomycorrhizal association with trees in the family Pinaceae and are especially common symbionts of pine, fir, and Douglas-fir trees. Through their ectomycorrhizal relationships Rhizopogon are thought to play an important role in the ecology of coniferous forests. Recent micromorphological and molecular phylogenetic study has established that Rhizopogon is a member of the Boletales, closely related to Suillus.

== Taxonomy ==
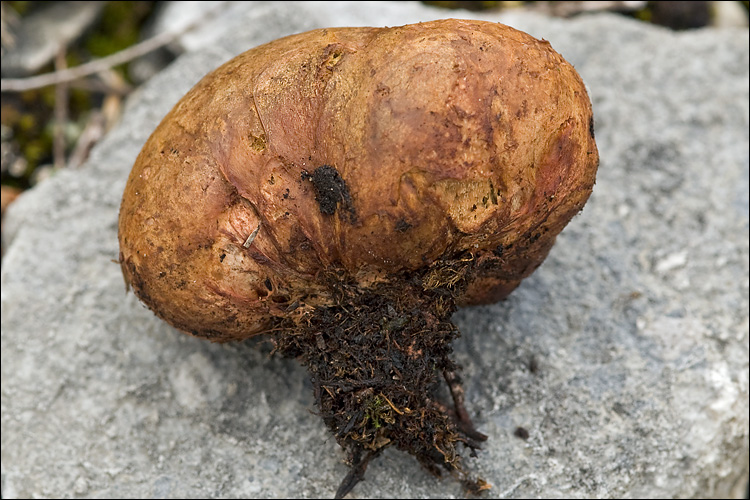
A sporocarp of Rhizopogon luteolus (=obtextus) showing rhizomorphs with adhering substrate

=== Historical classification ===
The genus Rhizopogon occurs throughout the natural and introduced ranges of family Pinaceae trees. Though this range covers much of the northern temperate zones, the diversity of Rhizopogon species is well characterized only in North America and Europe. As of October 2025, there were over 220 recognized species of Rhizopogon. The morphology of Rhizopogon species is highly cryptic and characters vary greatly throughout sporocarp maturity. This has led to the description of multiple species from various developmental stages of a single fungus.

The genus Rhizopogon was first described from Europe by Elias Magnus Fries in 1817. The North American monograph was produced by Alexander H. Smith in 1966 with second author credits given posthumously to Sanford Myron Zeller due to his contributions to the study of the genus. A European monograph of Rhizopogon has also been published. In the recent past, molecular phylogenetic methods have allowed the revision of the taxonomic concepts of the genus Rhizopogon.

=== Modern classification ===
Modern taxonomic concepts of the genus Rhizopogon recognize five subgenera of Rhizopogon. These are subgenus Rhizopogon, subgenus Versicolores, subgenus Villosuli, subgenus Amylopogon, and subgenus Roseoli.

== Ecology ==
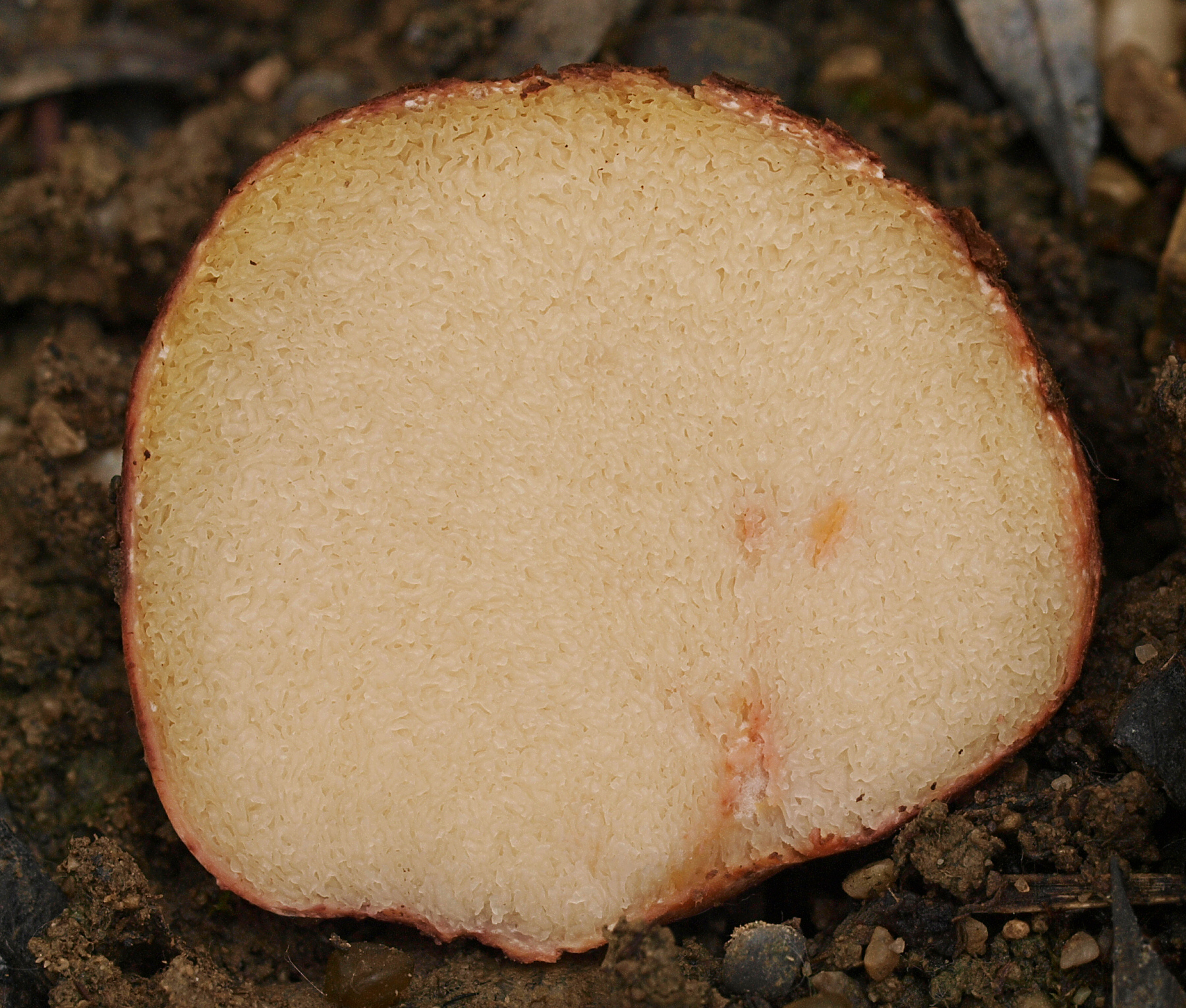
A sporocarp of Rhizopogon roseolus in cross section showing a close up of the gleba locules

=== Mammalian diet and spore dispersal ===
Rhizopogon species have been established as a common component in the diet of many small mammals as well as deer in Western North America. The viability of Rhizopogon spores is maintained and may even be increased after mammalian gut passage, making mammals an important dispersal vector for Rhizopogon.

=== Disturbance ecology ===
Rhizopogon species are common members of the fungal communities that colonize the roots of trees during seedling establishment and persist into old growth stands. Rhizopogon spores are long lived in soil and the spores of some species can persist for at least four years with an increase in viability over time. Rhizopogon seems to be especially common upon the roots of establishing tree seedlings following disturbance such as fire or logging. Rhizopogon are also abundant colonizers of pot cultivated and field cultivated conifer seedlings growing in soil from conifer stands that lacked observations of Rhizopogon upon the roots of mature trees. These finding suggest that Rhizopogon species are an important factor in the recovery of conifer forests following disturbance.

=== Invasive facilitator ===
Rhizopogon species have been shown to have a global distribution in the Homogenocene. The enzymes exuded from some species within the subgenus Amylopogon is essential in activating seed germination in some species of Monotropoideae, such as Pterspora andromedeae. This makes Rhizopogon an obligatory host to species like P. andromedeae. The exoenzymatic activity also confers higher competitive advantages to host species, mainly within the genus Pinus, by helping to break down nutrients within the soil. The presence of Rhizopogon in soil facilitates Pinus as an invasive species. This exoenzymatic activity is nitrogen limited. In the case of subgenus Amylopogon parasitized by P. andromedeae the nitrogen cost of exoenzymatic production is in part paid for by bacteria within the family Burkholderiaceae that is hosted by P. andromedeae

=== Species ===
- Rhizopogon albidus
- Rhizopogon ater
- Rhizopogon atroviolaceus
- Rhizopogon brunneniger
- Rhizopogon ellenae
- Rhizopogon evadens
- Rhizopogon fulvigleba
- Rhizopogon fuscorubens
- Rhizopogon hawkerae
- Rhizopogon himalayensis
- Rhizopogon luteolus
- Rhizopogon nigrescens
- Rhizopogon occidentalis
- Rhizopogon ochraceorubens
- Rhizopogon parksii
- Rhizopogon parvisporus
- Rhizopogon pedicellus
- Rhizopogon roseolus
- Rhizopogon salebrosus
- Rhizopogon subareolatus
- Rhizopogon subaustralis
- Rhizopogon subcaerulescens
- Rhizopogon subpurpurascens
- Rhizopogon subsalmonius
- Rhizopogon succosus
- Rhizopogon togasawariana
- Rhizopogon truncatus
- Rhizopogon vesiculosus
- Rhizopogon villosulus
- Rhizopogon vinicolor
- Rhizopogon vulgaris

== Ethnomycology ==
=== Forestry ===
The first intentional use of Rhizopogon species in forestry occurred in the early part of the 20th century when Rhizopogon luteolus was deliberately introduced into Pinus radiata plantations in Western Australia after it was observed to improve tree growth. Since that time, Rhizopogon species have been widely studied as a component of managed forests. Rhizopogon species have been noted as common members of the ectomycorrhizal community colonizing tree roots of pine and Douglas-fir timber plantations. Naturally occurring Rhizopogon roseolus (=rubescens) spores have been shown to out-compete the spores of other ectomycorrhizal fungi in pine plantations even when competing spores were directly inoculated onto seedlings. The survival rate and performance of pine and Douglas-fir plantation seedlings are increased after inoculation with Rhizopogon species.

=== Gastronomy ===
Though this genera is considered edible, most members are not held in high culinary esteem. A notable exception is R. roseolus, which is considered a delicacy in Japan, where it is traditionally known as shōro. Techniques for the commercial cultivation of this fungus in pine plantations have been developed and applied with successful results in Japan and New Zealand.
