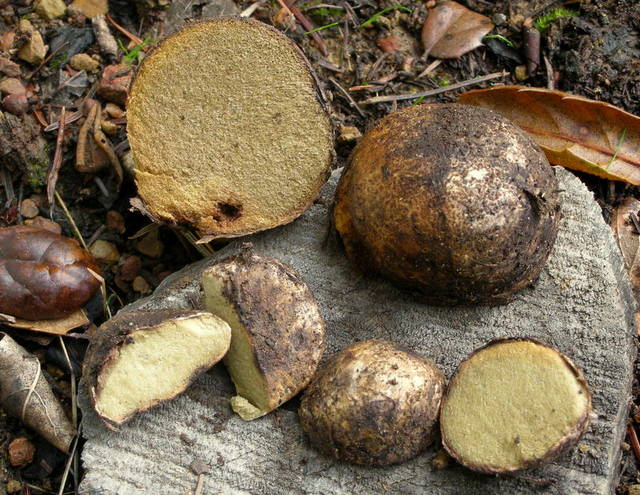

Scientific classification
- Domain: Eukaryota
- Kingdom: Fungi
- Division: Basidiomycota
- Class: Agaricomycetes
- Order: Boletales
- Family: Rhizopogonaceae
- Genus: Rhizopogon
- Species: R. villosulus

Binomial name
- Rhizopogon villosulus Zeller (1941)

Synonyms
- Rhizopogon reticulatus Hawker (1955); Rhizopogon colossus A.H.Sm. (1966); Rhizopogon colossus var. nigromaculatus A.H.Sm. (1966); Rhizopogon hawkerae A.H.Sm. (1966); Rhizopogon parksii A.H.Sm. (1966); Rhizopogon subareolatus A.H.Sm. (1966)

= Rhizopogon villosulus =

Species of fungus

Rhizopogon villosulus is an ectomycorrhizal fungus used as a soil inoculant in agriculture and horticulture. It was first described scientifically by mycologist Sanford Myron Zeller in 1941.
