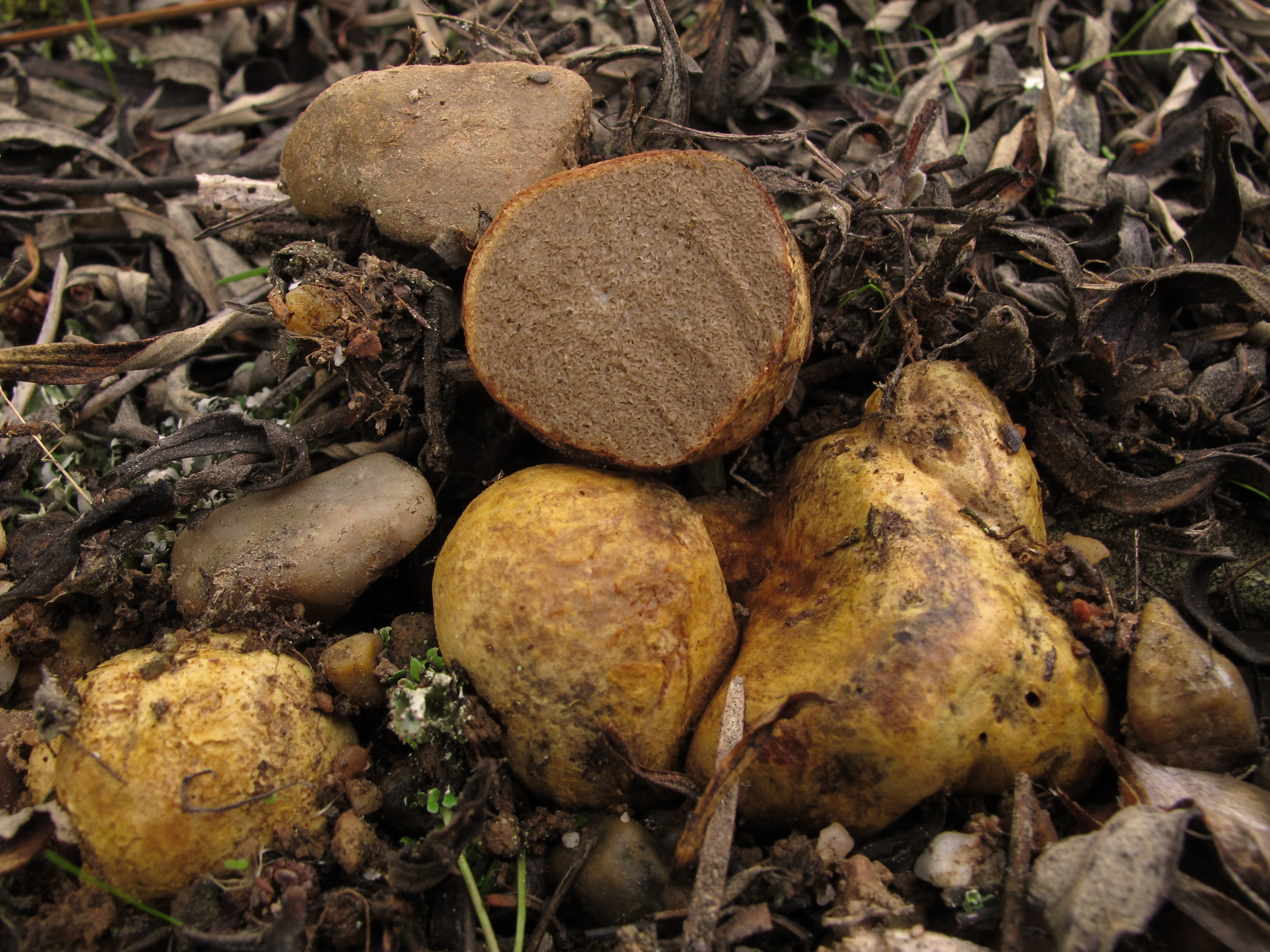

Scientific classification
- Domain: Eukaryota
- Kingdom: Fungi
- Division: Basidiomycota
- Class: Agaricomycetes
- Order: Boletales
- Family: Rhizopogonaceae
- Genus: Rhizopogon
- Species: R. vulgaris

Binomial name
- Rhizopogon vulgaris (Vittad.) M.Lange (1956)

Synonyms
- Hysteromyces vulgaris Vittad. (1844); Rhizopogon rubescens var. vittadinii Tul. & C.Tul. (1851); Rhizopogon vittadinii (Tul.) Zeller (1939)

= Rhizopogon vulgaris =

Species of fungus

Rhizopogon vulgaris is an ectomycorrhizal fungus used as a soil inoculant in agriculture and horticulture.
