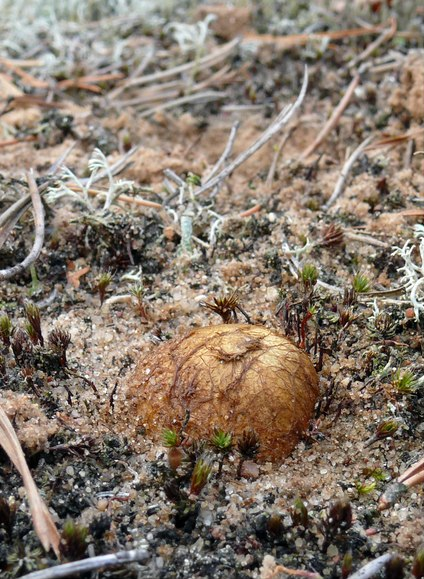

Scientific classification
- Domain: Eukaryota
- Kingdom: Fungi
- Division: Basidiomycota
- Class: Agaricomycetes
- Order: Boletales
- Family: Rhizopogonaceae
- Genus: Rhizopogon
- Species: R. luteolus

Binomial name
- Rhizopogon luteolus Fr.

= Rhizopogon luteolus =

Species of fungus

Rhizopogon luteolus is an ectomycorrhizal fungus used as a soil inoculant in agriculture and horticulture. It was deliberately introduced into Pinus radiata plantations in Western Australia after it was observed to improve tree growth.
