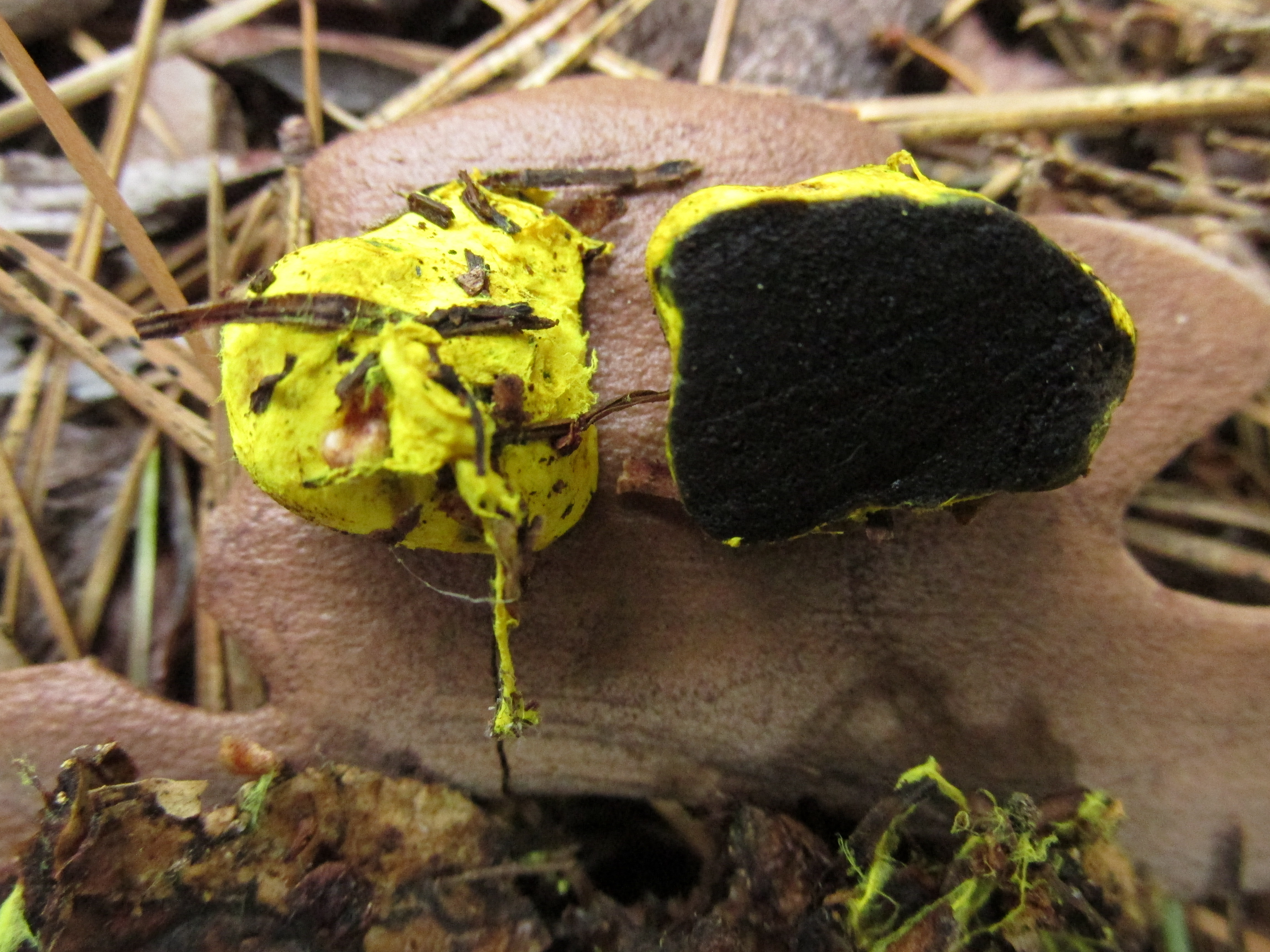

Conservation status
- Apparently Secure (NatureServe)

Scientific classification
- Domain: Eukaryota
- Kingdom: Fungi
- Division: Basidiomycota
- Class: Agaricomycetes
- Order: Boletales
- Family: Rhizopogonaceae
- Genus: Rhizopogon
- Species: R. truncatus

Binomial name
- Rhizopogon truncatus Linder (1924)

= Rhizopogon truncatus =

Species of fungus

Rhizopogon truncatus is an ectomycorrhizal fungus in the family Rhizopogonaceae. It was described by American mycologist David Hunt Linder in 1924.
