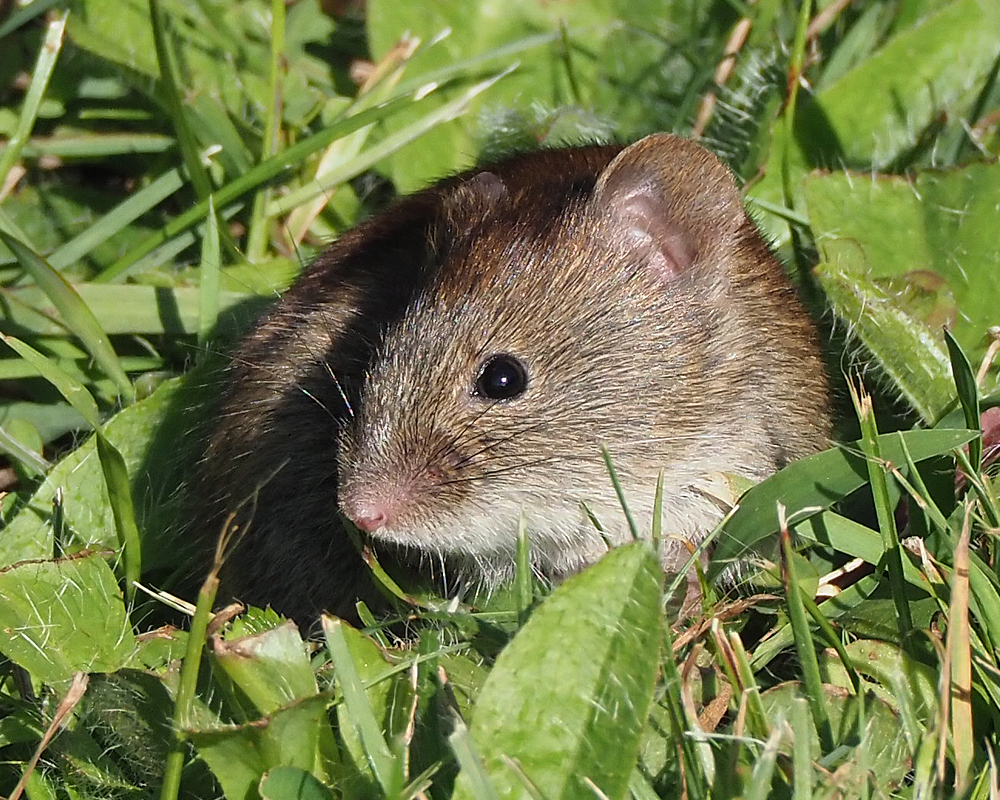

Conservation status
- Least Concern (IUCN 3.1)

Scientific classification
- Kingdom: Animalia
- Phylum: Chordata
- Class: Mammalia
- Order: Rodentia
- Family: Cricetidae
- Subfamily: Arvicolinae
- Genus: Clethrionomys
- Species: C. gapperi

Binomial name
- Clethrionomys gapperi (Vigors, 1830)

= Southern red-backed vole =

Species of rodent

The southern red-backed vole or Gapper's red-backed vole (Clethrionomys gapperi) is a small slender vole found in Canada and the northern United States. It is closely related to the western red-backed vole (Clethrionomys californius), which lives to the south and west of its range and which is less red with a less sharply bicolored tail.

== Description ==
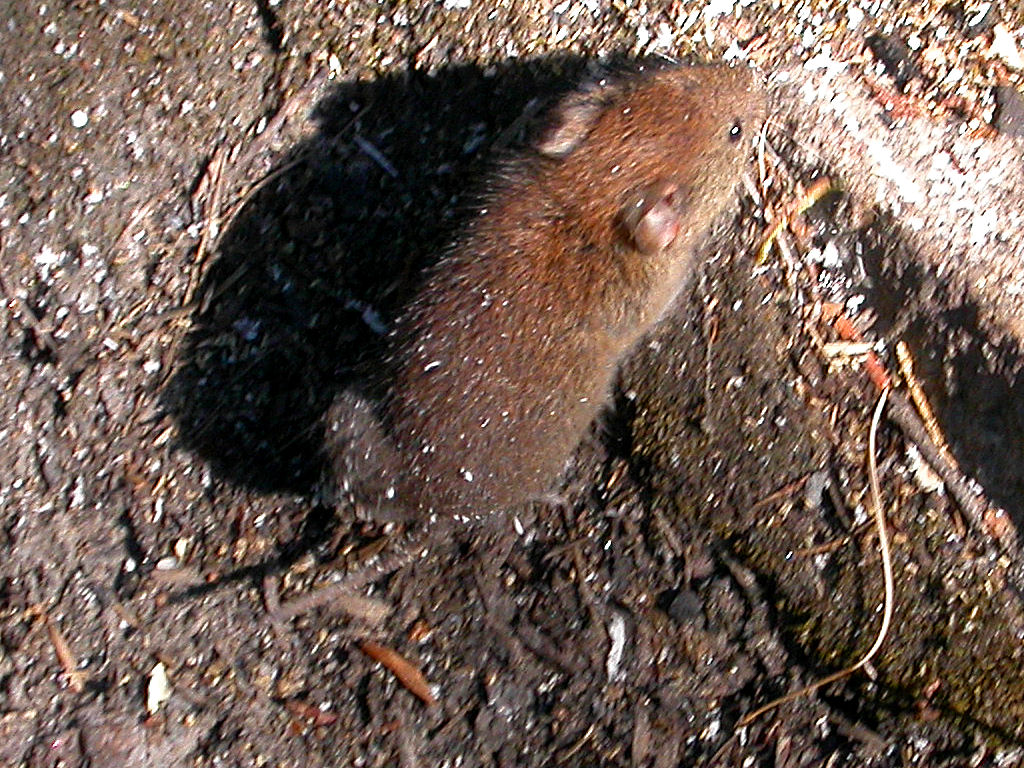
Top view, Lady Evelyn-Smoothwater Provincial Park, Ontario

These voles have short slender bodies with a reddish band along the back and a short tail. The sides of the body and head are grey and the underparts are paler. There is a grey color morph in the northeast part of their range. They are 12–16.5 cm (4.7–6.5 in) long with a 4 cm tail and weigh about 6–42 g; average 20.6 g (0.21–1.48 oz; average 0.72 oz).

== Habitat ==
These animals are found in coniferous, deciduous, and mixed forests, often near wetlands. They tend to follow paths they have established, runways through the surface growth in warm weather and tunnels through the snow in winter. They are omnivorous, feeding on green plants, underground fungi, seeds, nuts, and roots, as well as insects, snails, and berries. They can store foods such as roots, bulbs, and nuts to feed on later.

== Behavior and Ecology ==
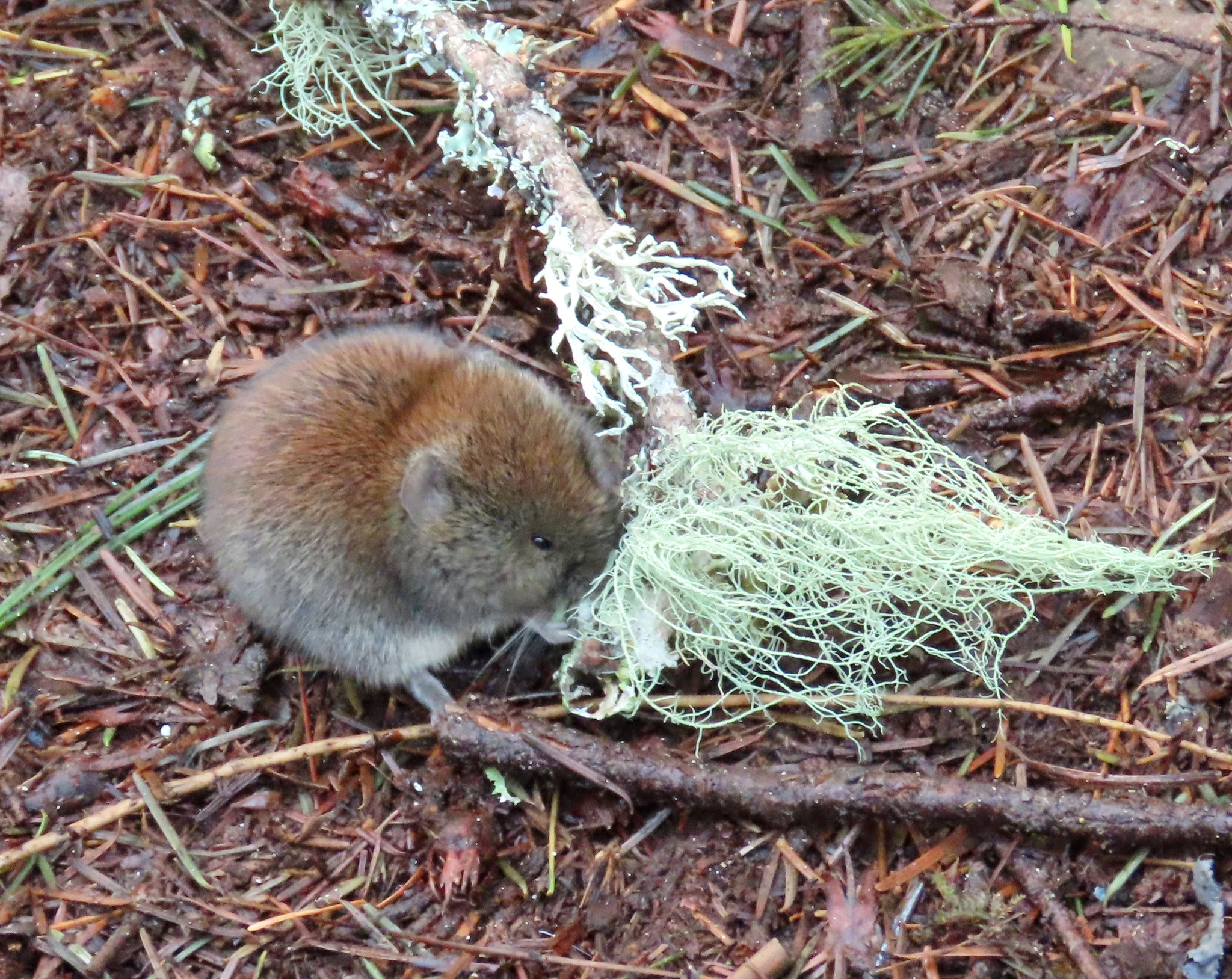
Southern red backed vole in ground foliage; photo taken by Kathleen Dobson

Southern red-backed voles are active year-round, mostly at night. They use burrows created by other small animals, such as squirrels and groundhogs. Their nests are 7–10 cm in length and can be found underground or in trees, built from scavenged plant materials from the forest floor.

=== Interspecific Competition ===
Southern red-backed voles are territorial towards their own species and other species that they compete with for resources. When populations of southern red-backed voles are established in an area, they can outcompete other species, such as North American deer mice (Peromyscus maniculatus), but destructive events, like forest fires, can greatly weaken their populations. In these cases, southern red-backed voles tend to struggle with quick recovery and are susceptible to being out competed by other species that are better equipped for surviving in more challenging environments.

== Predators ==
Predators include hawks, owls, mustelids, timber rattlesnakes, bobcats, and weasels. They are also preyed on by Canidae such as foxes and coyotes.

== Mating ==
The mating season for the Southern red-backed vole begins right before the first signs of spring. Once pregnant, the female voles will typically give birth within 17 to 19 days having litters of two to eight young. By the age of 3 months old, the young are able to contribute to reproduction.
