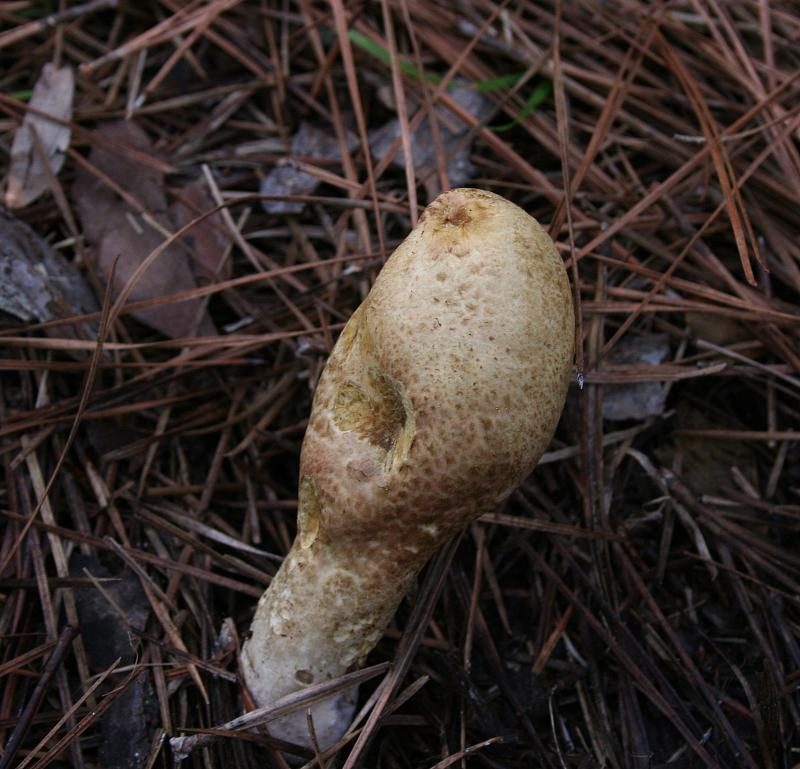

Scientific classification
- Kingdom: Fungi
- Division: Basidiomycota
- Class: Agaricomycetes
- Order: Boletales
- Family: Rhizopogonaceae
- Genus: Rhopalogaster; J.R.Johnst. (1902)
- Species: R. transversarium

Binomial name
- Rhopalogaster transversarium (Bosc) J.R.Johnst. (1902)

Synonyms
- Lycoperdon transversarium Bosc (1811); Cauloglossum transversarium (Bosc) Fr. (1829)

= Rhopalogaster =

Genus of fungi

Rhopalogaster is a genus of secotioid basidiomycetes. The genus is monotypic, and contains the single species Rhopalogaster transversarium, found in the USA. This fungus was originally described as new to science in 1811 by French botanist Louis Augustin Guillaume Bosc; Elias Magnus Fries transferred it to Cauloglossum in 1829. The genus was properly defined in 1902 by John Robert Johnston.
