= Saimyō-ji (Mashiko) =

Buddhist temple in Mashiko, Tochigi, Japan

- 西明寺
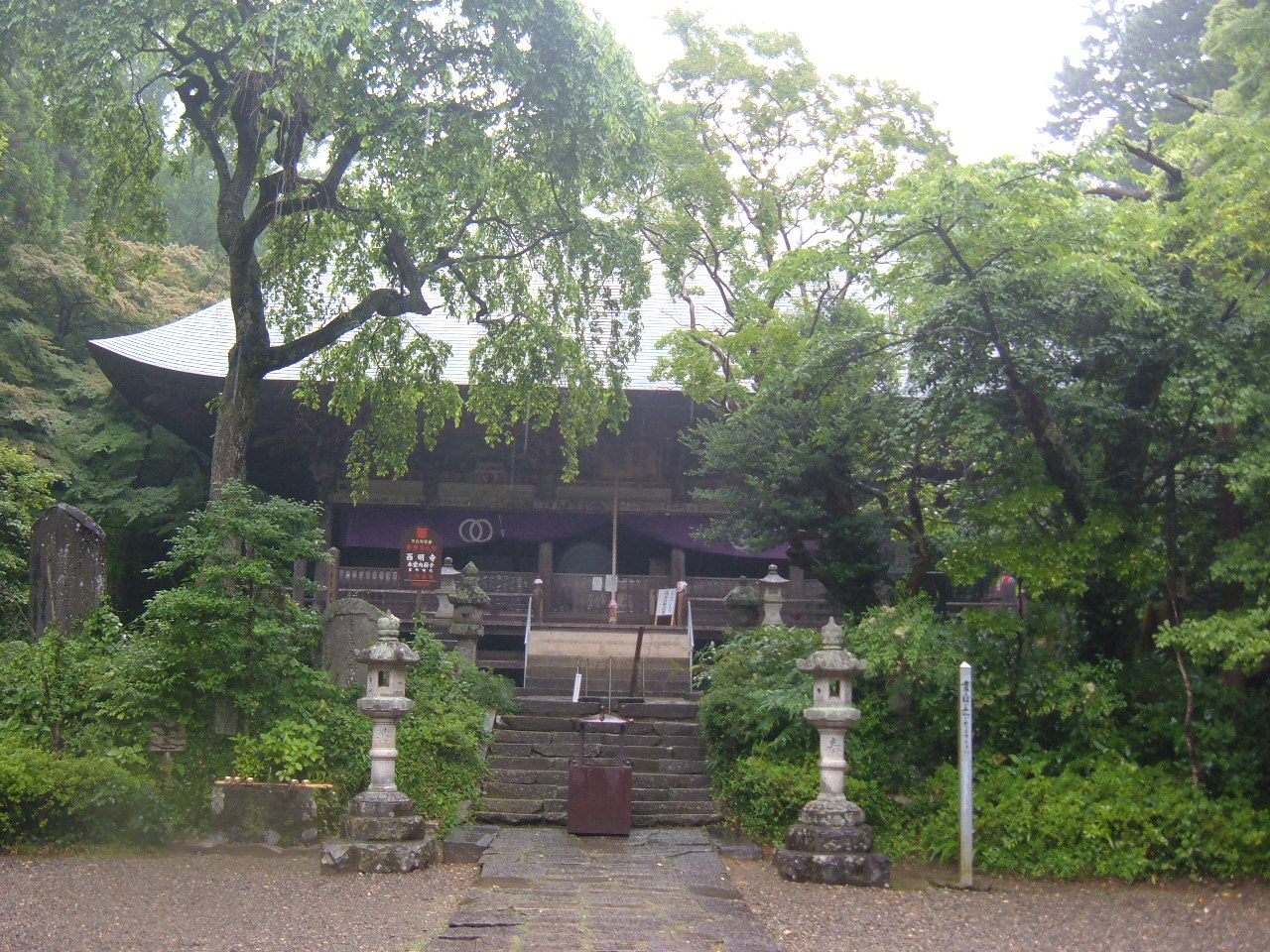
- Kannon-do (Hondo)

- Location within Tochigi Prefecture Location within Japan

Religion
- Affiliation: Buddhist
- Deity: Jūichimen Kannon Bosatsu
- Rite: Shingon-shu Buzan-ha
- Status: functional

Location
- Location: 4469 Mashiko, Mashiko-machi, Haga-gun, Tochigi-ken 321-4217
- Country: Japan
- Interactive map of Saimyō-ji
- Coordinates: 36°27′10″N 140°7′2.5″E

Architecture
- Founder: c.Gyōki
- Completed: c.Tenpyō period
- National Important Cultural Property

Saimyō-ji (西明寺) is a Buddhist temple located in the Mashiko neighborhood of the town of Mashiko, Tochigi Prefecture, Japan. It belongs to the Buzan-branch of Shingon Buddhism and its honzon is a statue of Jūichimen Kannon Bosatsu. The temple's full name is Tokkō-zan Fumon-in Saimyō-ji (独鈷山 善門院 西明寺).The temple is the 20th stop on the Bandō Sanjūsankasho pilgrimage route.

== Overview ==
The foundation of this temple is uncertain. According to the temple's legend, it was founded by either the priest Gyōki or Kūkai in the Tenpyō period (729-749), or was expanded from a previous chapel by Ki no Arimaro in 839. In the 12th century the temple fell into disrepair, but was reconstructed by Utsunomiya Kagefusa in 1209. In 1255, the 5th shikken of the Kamakura shogunate, Hōjō Tokiyori (1227–1263), ensured that the temple complex was completed. The temple was subsequently destroyed and rebuilt many times over its history. It is the only temple where one can see a statue of a laughing Enma, the Judge of Hell. The temple also has a stand of shikeidake, a decorative bamboo originally from China with four-sided, rather than round, stalks that grow to 30 feet in height.

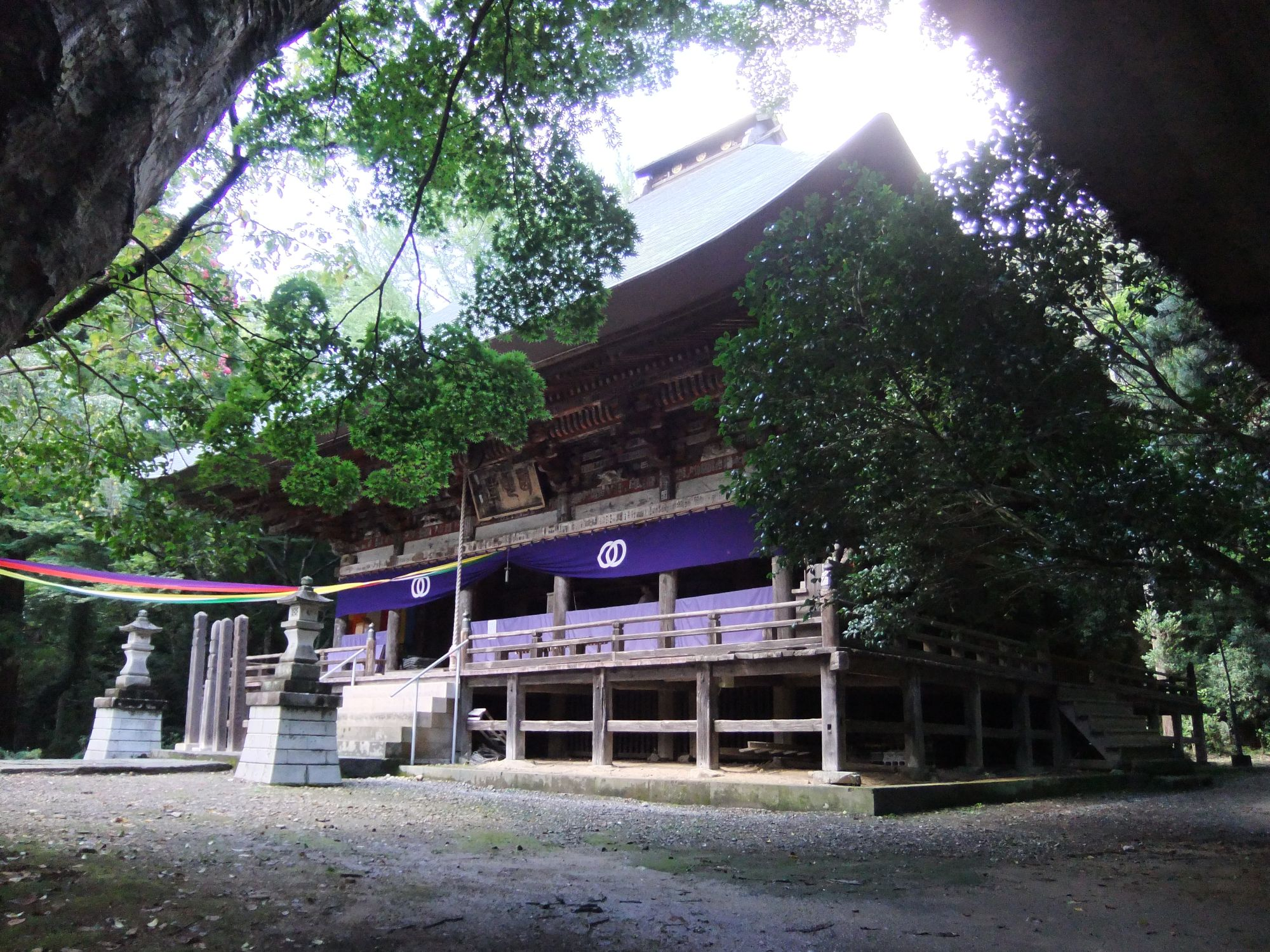
Hondo (ICP)

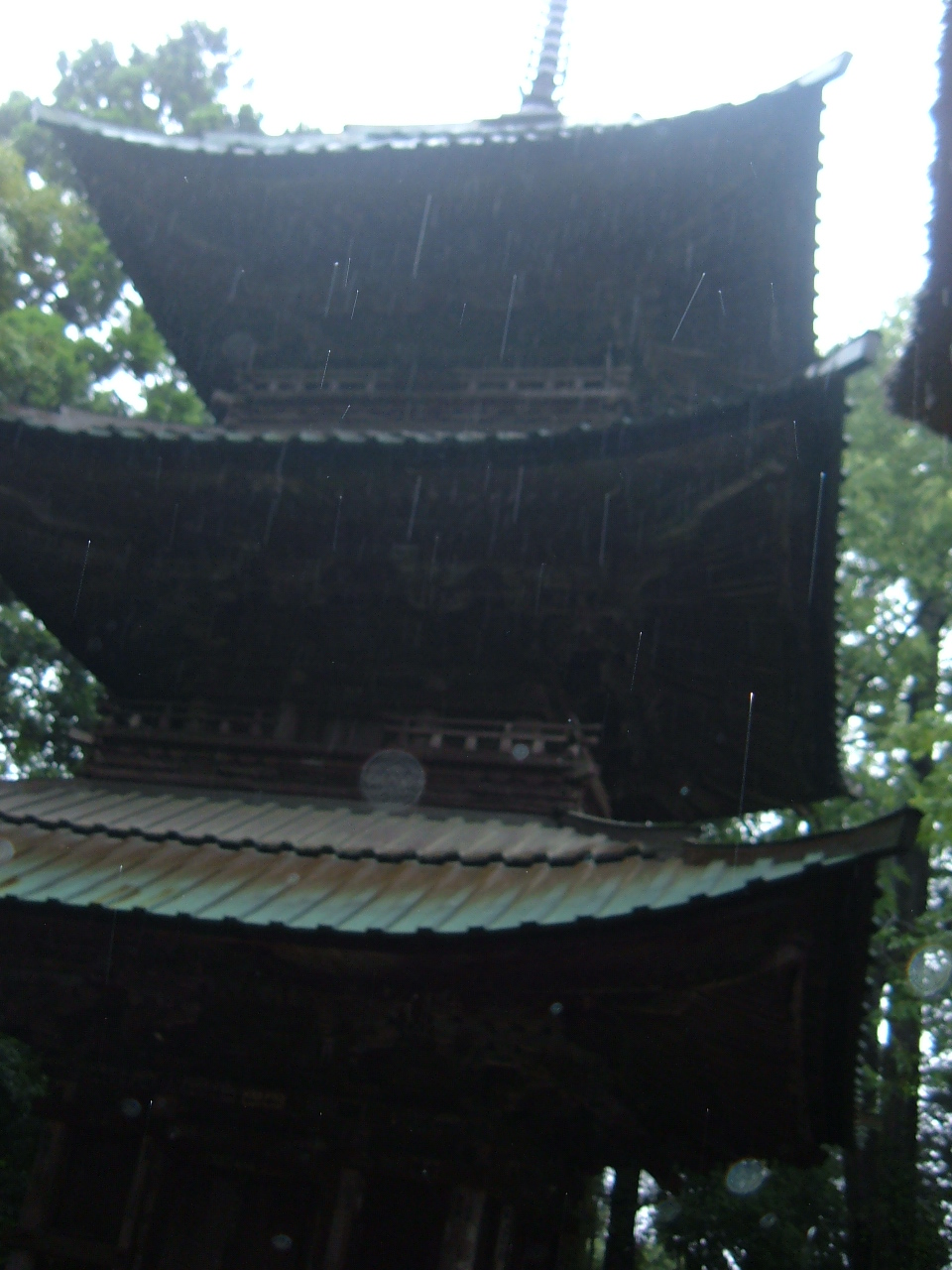
Three-story pagoda

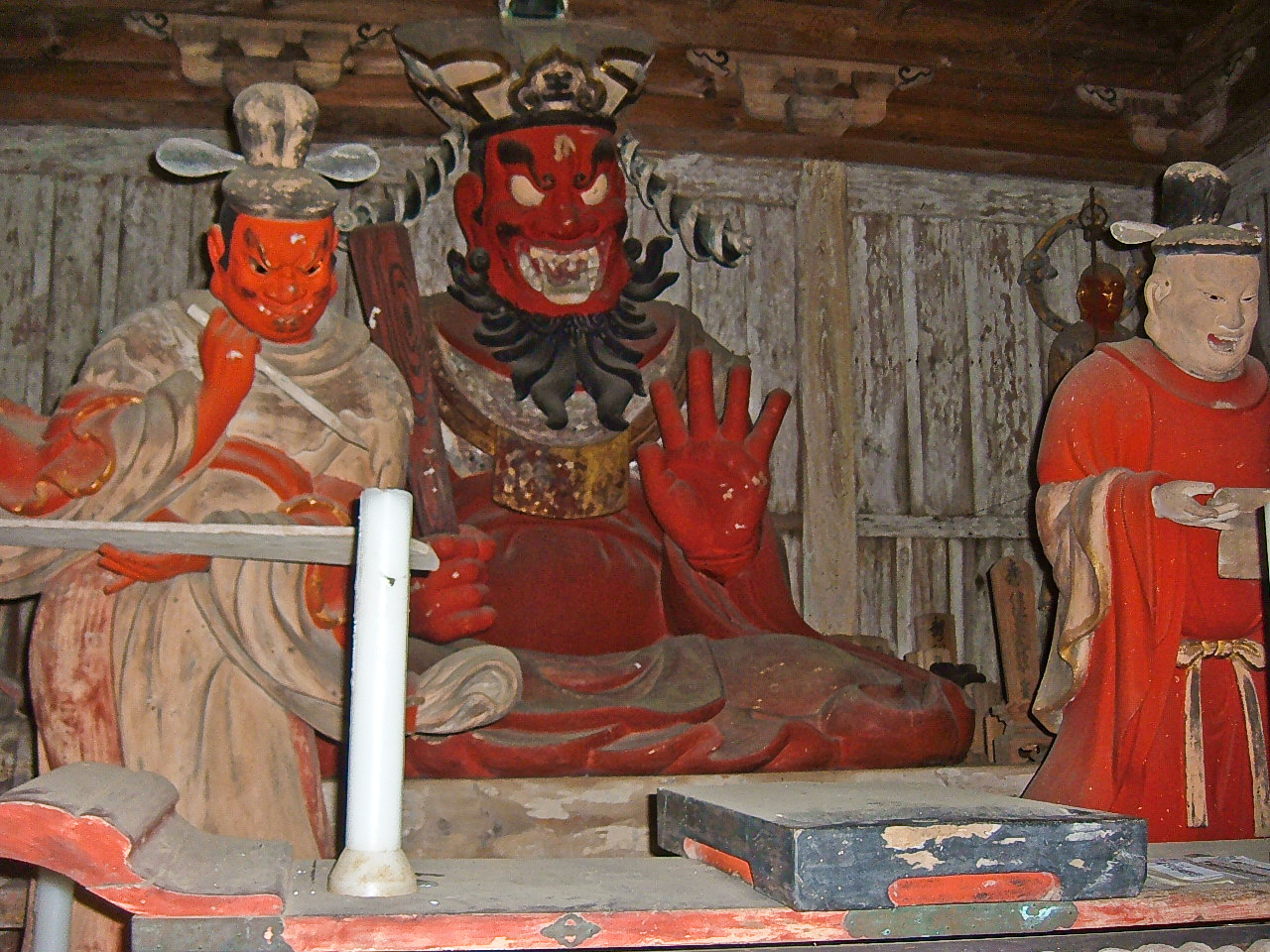
Seated wooden statue of Emma-O (ICP)

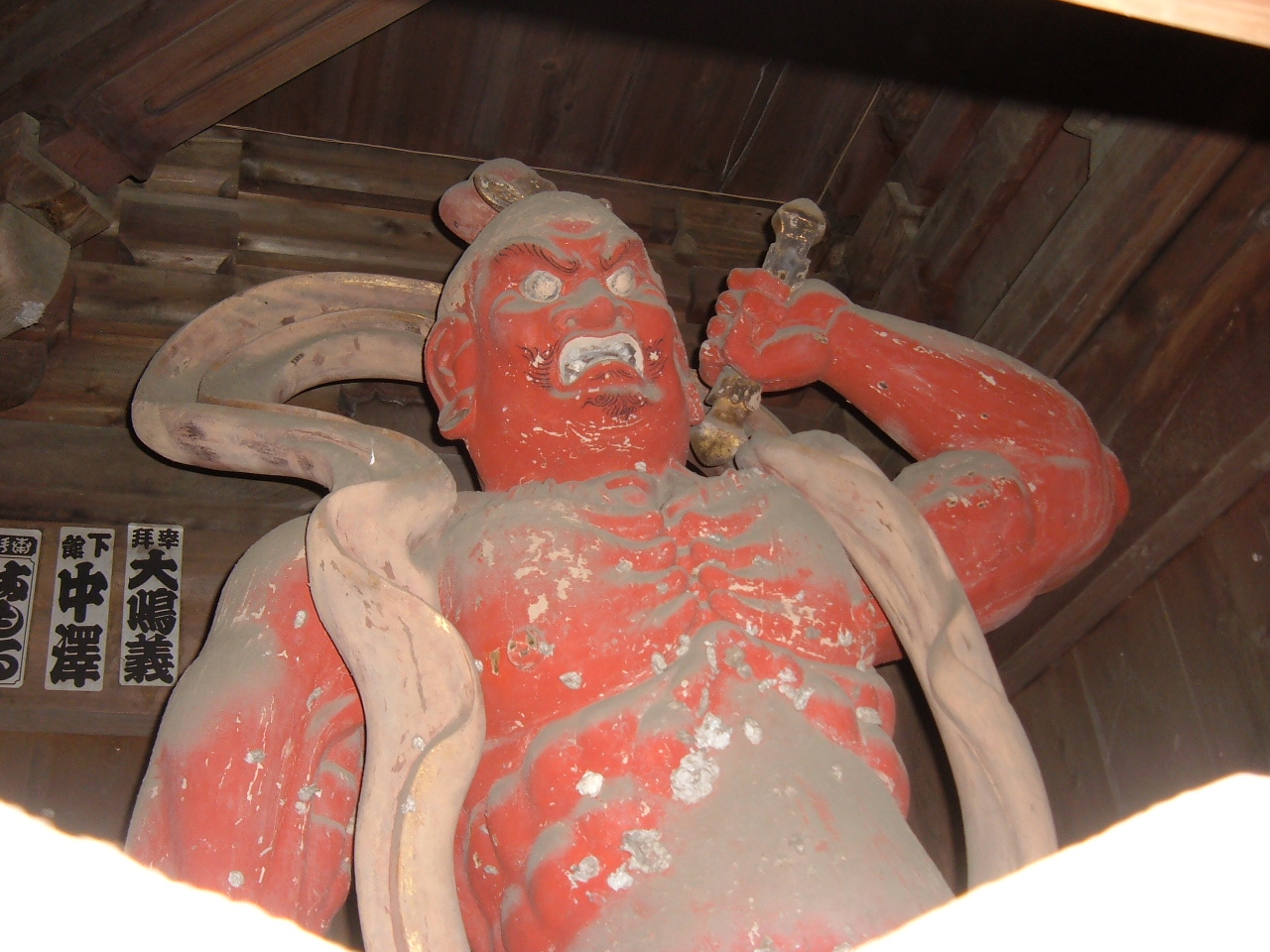
Niō statue

The temple is located approximately 3.7 kilometers from Mashiko Station on the Moka Railway.

== Cultural Properties ==
=== National Important Cultural Properties ===
- Rōmon Gate (楼門), Muromachi period (1494).
- Three-story Pagoda (三重塔, Sanjūnotō), Muromachi period (1537).
- Zushi altar in Hondo (本堂内厨子), Muromachi period (1394).

=== Tochigi Prefectural Important Cultural Properties ===
- Main hall (本堂), Edo period
- Shōro (鐘楼). It is a two-story structure with a thatch roof and the bell on the upper floor.
- Seated wooden statue of Enma (木造閻魔大王坐像)
- Standing wooden statue of Juichimen Kannon (木造千手観音菩薩立像 附:木札6枚), Kamakura period (1621).
- Seated wooden statue of Juichimen Kannon (木造千手観音菩薩坐像)
- Set of statues in the Hondo Altar (西明寺本堂厨子内仏像群). The set consists of a standing Juchimen Kannon, standing Sho-Kannon, standing Bato Kannon, seated Nyoirin Kannon, standing Juntei Kannon, standing Enmei Kannon, standing Seishi Bosatsu, Standing Bishimon-ten
- Bonshō (梵鐘), Kamakura period (1328), but re-cast in 1671.

=== Tochigi Prefectural Historic Site ===
- Saimyō-ji Precincts (西明寺境内).
