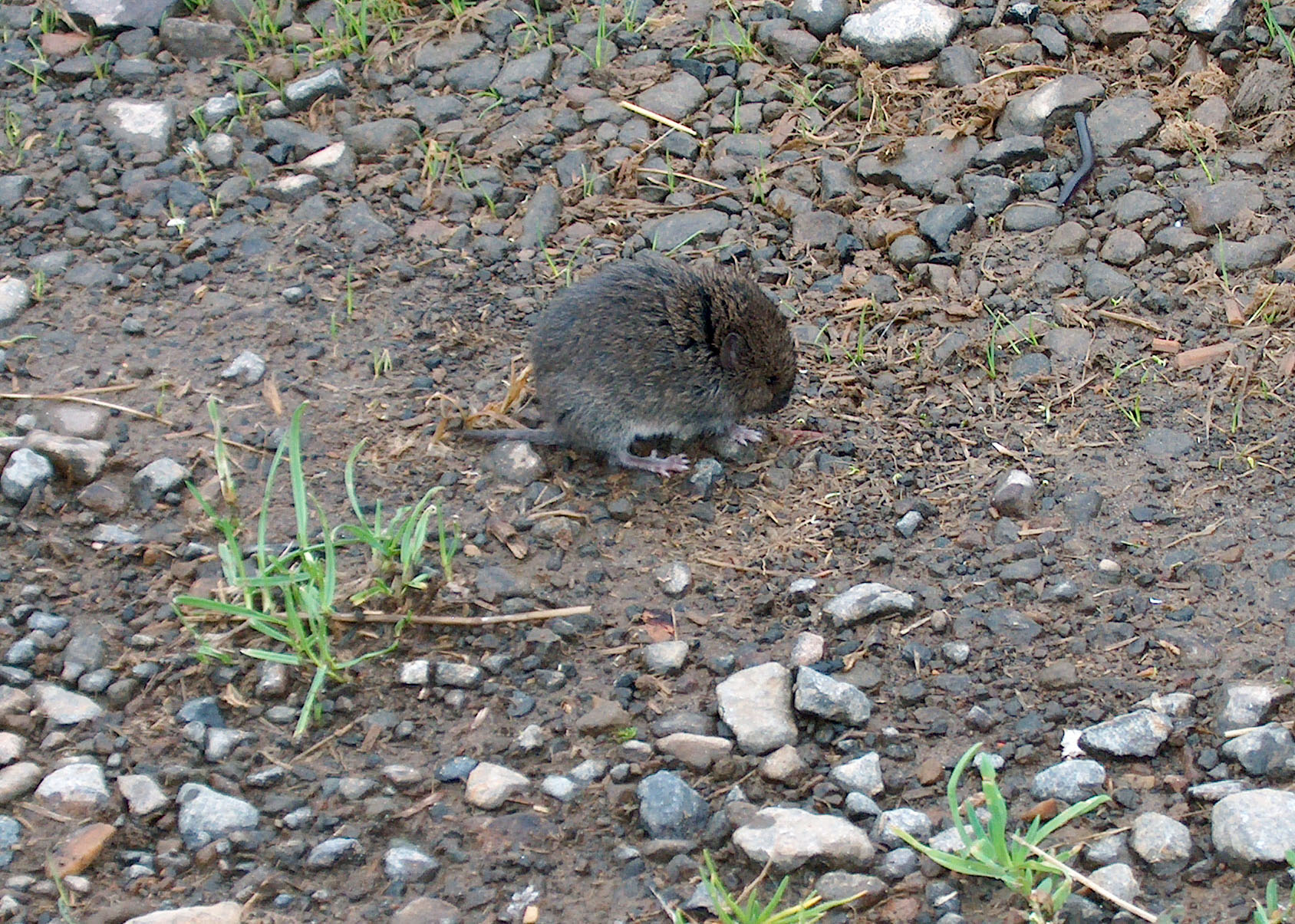

Conservation status
- Least Concern (IUCN 3.1)

Scientific classification
- Kingdom: Animalia
- Phylum: Chordata
- Class: Mammalia
- Infraclass: Placentalia
- Order: Rodentia
- Family: Cricetidae
- Subfamily: Arvicolinae
- Genus: Clethrionomys
- Species: C. californicus

Binomial name
- Clethrionomys californicus (Merriam, 1890)
- Distribution of the Western red-backed vole

Synonyms
- Myodes californicus; M. mazama (Merriam, 1897); M. obscurus (Merriam, 1897)

= Western red-backed vole =

Species of rodent

The western red-backed vole (Clethrionomys californicus) is a species of vole in the family Cricetidae. It is found in California and Oregon in the United States and lives mainly in coniferous forest. The body color is chestnut brown, or brown mixed with a considerable quantity of black hair gradually lightening on the sides and grading into a buffy-gray belly, with an indistinct reddish stripe on the back and a bicolored tail about half as long as the head and body.

== Taxonomy ==
The western red-backed vole was initially described by C. Hart Merriam under its original scientific name Evotomys californicus. The type specimen was obtained from near Eureka, California. It was an adult male collected by Theodore Sherman Palmer on June 3, 1889.

== Description ==
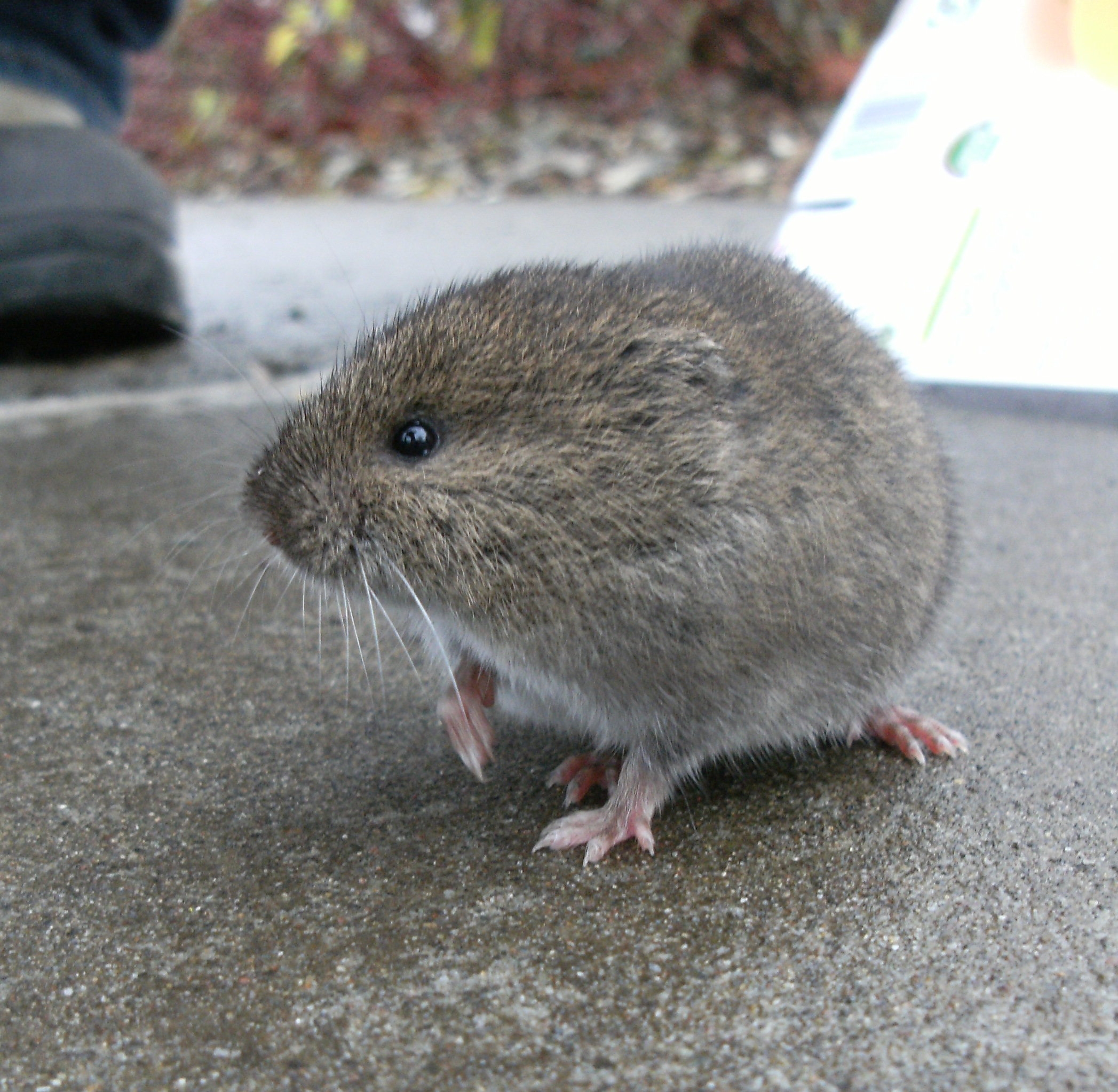
Animal identified as western red-backed vole, taken in Hillsboro, Oregon

Skull dimensions
	Minimum	Maximum
Basal length	21.8 mm (0.86 in)	23.3 mm (0.92 in)
Nasal length	7.2 mm (0.28 in)	7.5 mm (0.30 in)
Zygomatic breadth	13.3 mm (0.52 in)	14.2 mm (0.56 in)
Mastoid breadth	11.5 mm (0.45 in)	12.4 mm (0.49 in)
Upper molar alveolus	4.5 mm (0.18 in)	5.3 mm (0.21 in)

The length of the western red-backed vole ranges from 121–165 mm (4.8–6.5 in) overall, with a tail between 34–56 mm (1.3–2.2 in), hindfoot 17–21 mm (0.67–0.83 in), and ear 10–14 mm (0.39–0.55 in). The height ranges between 18–21 mm (0.71–0.83 in).

The species is closely related to the southern red-backed vole (Clethrionomys gapperi), which lives to the north and east of the range of this species, and is redder, with a more sharply bicolored tail. They are differentiated based on a reddish stripe on the dorsum of the western red-backed vole. The western red-backed vole also has characteristic differences in the anatomy of the hard palate.

== Distribution and habitat ==
It is found in northern California and western Oregon in the United States. The northern limit is defined by the Columbia River, with the range extending south to around 100 km (62 mi) north of the San Francisco Bay. The range extends from the summits of the Cascade Range in the east, to the Pacific Ocean. They live mainly in mature coniferous forest but also inhabit mixed fir-oak forest. They live in the Transition and Canadian life zones, described by Vernon Orlando Bailey in The mammals and life zones of Oregon.

== Behavior and ecology ==
The western red-backed vole lives largely underground in an extensive system of burrows. It feeds primarily on fruiting bodies of hypogeous fungi. These mycorrhizal fungi are the symbionts of the forest trees around it. Rhizopogon vinicolor is one such which is associated with the Douglas-fir (Pseudotsuga spp.). Fruiting of the fungus takes place in well decayed timber when the nutrients are becoming exhausted. Because the fruiting bodies are underground, the spores are not liberated into the air as in most fungal species. However, the spores are found in the vole's droppings and are deposited throughout its burrows, thus enabling the fungus to spread and form associations with uninfected trees. It has been found that in a clear-cut forest where all the dead wood and trimmings are removed, the mycorrhiza stops fruiting, the vole population dies out and newly planted trees fail to thrive. This is an example of a three way symbiosis, as the vole gains food from the fungus and spreads its spores, and the fungus gains photosynthetic products from the tree which benefits from the nutrients produced by the fungus.

The western red-backed vole plays an important role as prey to a number of species, including martens, ermines, and long-tailed weasels. The red tree vole, northern flying squirrel, and western red-backed vole may constitute more than 75% of the northern spotted owls diet.

No fossil remains have been identified yet.

The species breeds between February and November on the slopes of the Cascade Range in north Oregon, as well as all year to the west of the Cascade Range, with 2–7 young per litter and a gestation period of around 18 days.

== Human Interaction ==
=== Conservation status ===
According to the IUCN, the species conservation status is of "least concern".

=== Biomonitoring ===
In areas where vole populations live in close proximity to industrial areas, voles are used as a biological indicator to monitor environmental contamination, especially persistent organic pollutants such as PCBs which build up in the vole's fatty tissues.
