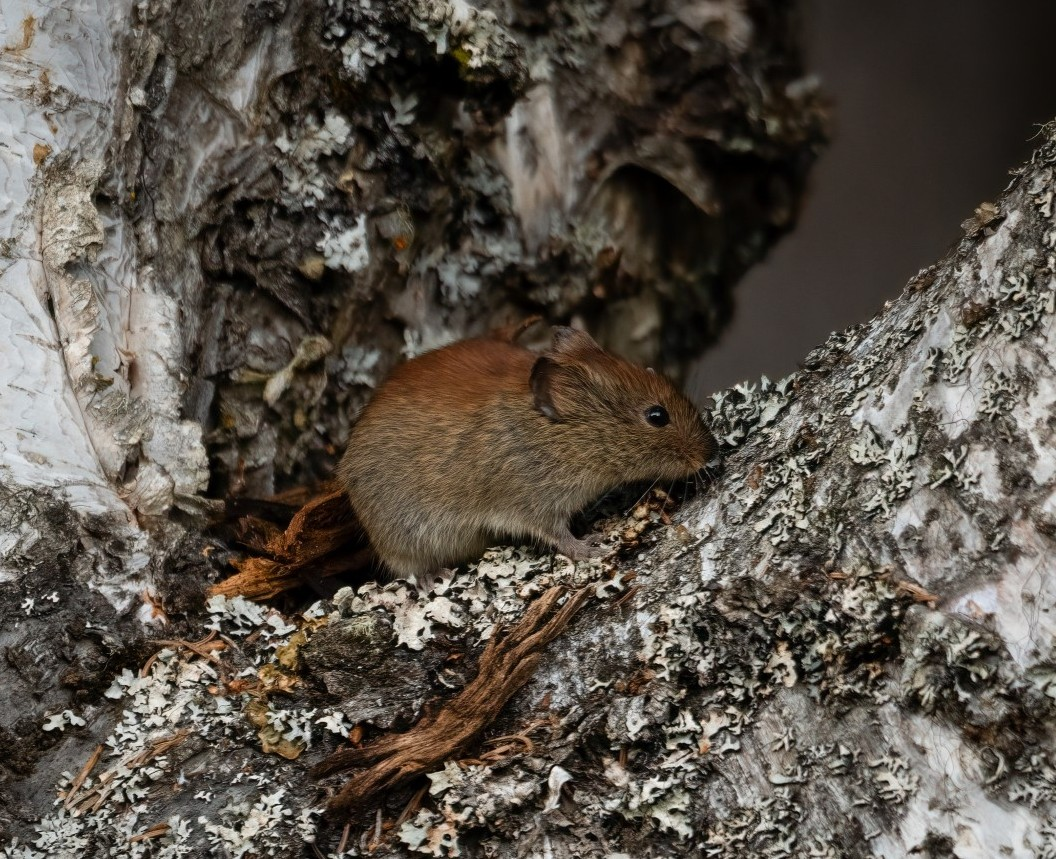

Conservation status
- Least Concern (IUCN 3.1)

Scientific classification
- Kingdom: Animalia
- Phylum: Chordata
- Class: Mammalia
- Order: Rodentia
- Family: Cricetidae
- Subfamily: Arvicolinae
- Genus: Clethrionomys
- Species: C. rutilus

Binomial name
- Clethrionomys rutilus (Pallas, 1779)
- Geographic range

= Northern red-backed vole =

Species of rodent

The northern red-backed vole (Clethrionomys rutilus) is a small slender vole found in Alaska, northern Canada, Scandinavia and northern Russia.

== Description ==
They have short slender bodies with a rust-colored back, light brown sides and underparts and a short thick tail. Their short ears are visible through their fur. They are 14 cm long with a 3.5 cm tail and weigh about 30 to 40 g. Their dental formula is 1/1, 0/0, 0/0, 3/3. They are active year-round, usually at night. They can cause damage to fruit trees and stored grains.

== Plant communities ==
Northern red-backed voles live in a variety of northern forest and shrubland habitats. They occur in every major forest type in central Alaska. Plant species commonly found in areas occupied by northern red-backed voles include black spruce (Picea mariana), white spruce (Picea glauca), quaking aspen (Populus tremuloides), paper birch (Betula papyrifera), alder (Alnus spp.), willow (Salix spp.), mountain cranberry (Vaccinium vitis-idaea), blueberry and bilberry (Vaccinium spp.), bunchberry (Cornus canadensis), and a variety of grasses and forbs. Important fungi, mosses and lichens include truffle (Endogone fascilulata), Schreber's moss (Pleurozium schreberi), mountain fern moss (Hylocomium splendens), sphagnum (Sphagnum spp.), and lichens (Cladonia and Peltigera spp.).

== Timing of major life events ==
The breeding season of northern red-backed voles generally extends from May to August. Females are polyestrous and produce two or three litters during the breeding season. The first litter is produced in late May or early June.

Litter size ranges from four to nine. The average litter size is 5.93. Young northern red-backed voles are unable to regulate their temperature successfully until about 18 days. At this time they are weaned and leave the nest. Young grow little during the winter because of low food supplies. Age of sexual maturity depends to some extent on time of birth. About 20% of females from the first litter breed during the summer of birth. The remaining 80%, and later litters, breed the following May. Martell and Fuller found that the onset of summer breeding was related to the time of snowmelt. A late spring was followed by a low rate of maturation of young-of-the-year females.

In dense populations of northern red-backed voles, sexual maturation of young females may be delayed, or they may migrate to a vacant breeding space.

Northern red-backed voles are mainly nocturnal and crepuscular, but remain active whenever necessary during the prolonged arctic daylight season.

== Preferred habitat ==
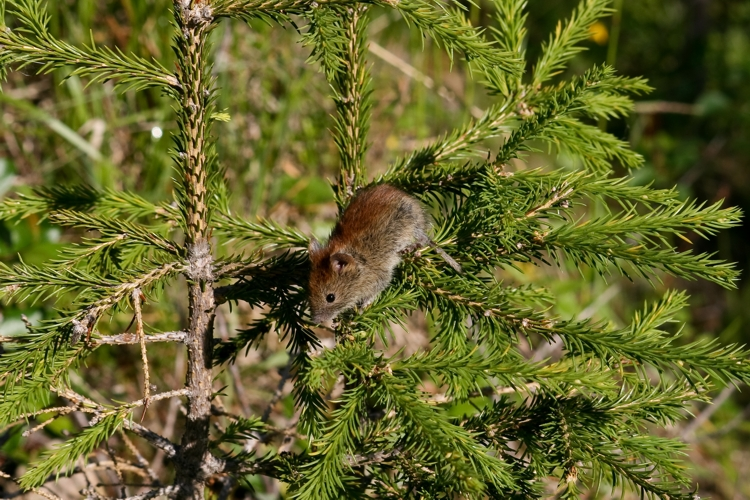
In Savukoski, Lapland (Lapland, Finland)

Northern red-backed voles are commonly found in northern shrub vegetation or open taiga forests. They also inhabit tundra. Northern red-backed voles are abundant on early successional sites as well as in mature forests. They occasionally inhabit rock fields and talus slopes.

Northern red-backed voles use surface runways through the vegetation as travel corridors. Nests are built in short burrows or under some protective object such as a rock or root. Northern red-backed voles are active all winter and construct long tunnels under the snow. Winter nests typically are placed on the ground among thick moss. Northern red-backed voles frequently invade houses during the winter.

== Cover requirements ==
Northern red-backed voles inhabit areas that contain dense ground cover for protection from weather and predation. On the Kenai National Wildlife Refuge in south-central Alaska, the presence of northern red-backed voles was positively correlated with protective cover. During the winter, northern red-backed voles use layers of thick moss or matted vegetation as thermal cover. During the mid-winter months in a spruce forest of central Alaska, all northern red-backed voles on a control area aggregated in a small area of thick moss cover, despite abundant food resources elsewhere on the trapping grid.

== Food habits ==
Northern red-backed voles eat the leaves, buds, twigs and berries of numerous shrubs; they also eat forbs, fungi, mosses, lichens, and occasionally insects. Berries are generally the major food item in the diet of northern red-backed voles and are eaten whenever available. In central Alaska, West found that northern red-backed voles relied heavily upon the fruits of several berry-producing plants during all seasons. These included bog blueberry (Vaccinium uliginosum), mountain cranberry, black crowberry (Empetrum nigrum), comandra (Comandra livida), and bunchberry. Northern red-backed voles primarily ate berries during the fall and winter. Lichens were consumed only during the winter and spring. In early summer, when berries are not available, mosses were eaten. The mid- to late summer diet of northern red-backed voles also included a large proportion of mosses, although berries were still the primary food.

Northern red-backed voles on the Kenai National Wildlife Refuge fed during the summer on berries of species such as mountain cranberry and bunchberry. They also ate fungi, succulent green plants, and insects. As fungi became plentiful late in the summer, they made up a large percentage of the diet. Mountain cranberry consumption declined as the summer progressed even though berry abundance increased. This suggests that fungi were preferred over mountain cranberries. The amount of truffle in the diet remained constant throughout the summer.

== Predators ==
Some predators of northern red-backed voles include American marten (Martes americana), Arctic fox (Vulpes lagopus), red fox (Vulpes vulpes), raccoon (Procyon lotor), stoat (Mustela erminea), snowy owl (Bubo scandiacus), coyote (Canis latrans), and probably most other predators of small mammals that occur within the range of northern red-backed voles. In Alaska, northern red-backed voles and voles (Microtus spp.) comprised 74% of the diet of American martens in the summer and 68% of the diet during the winter.
