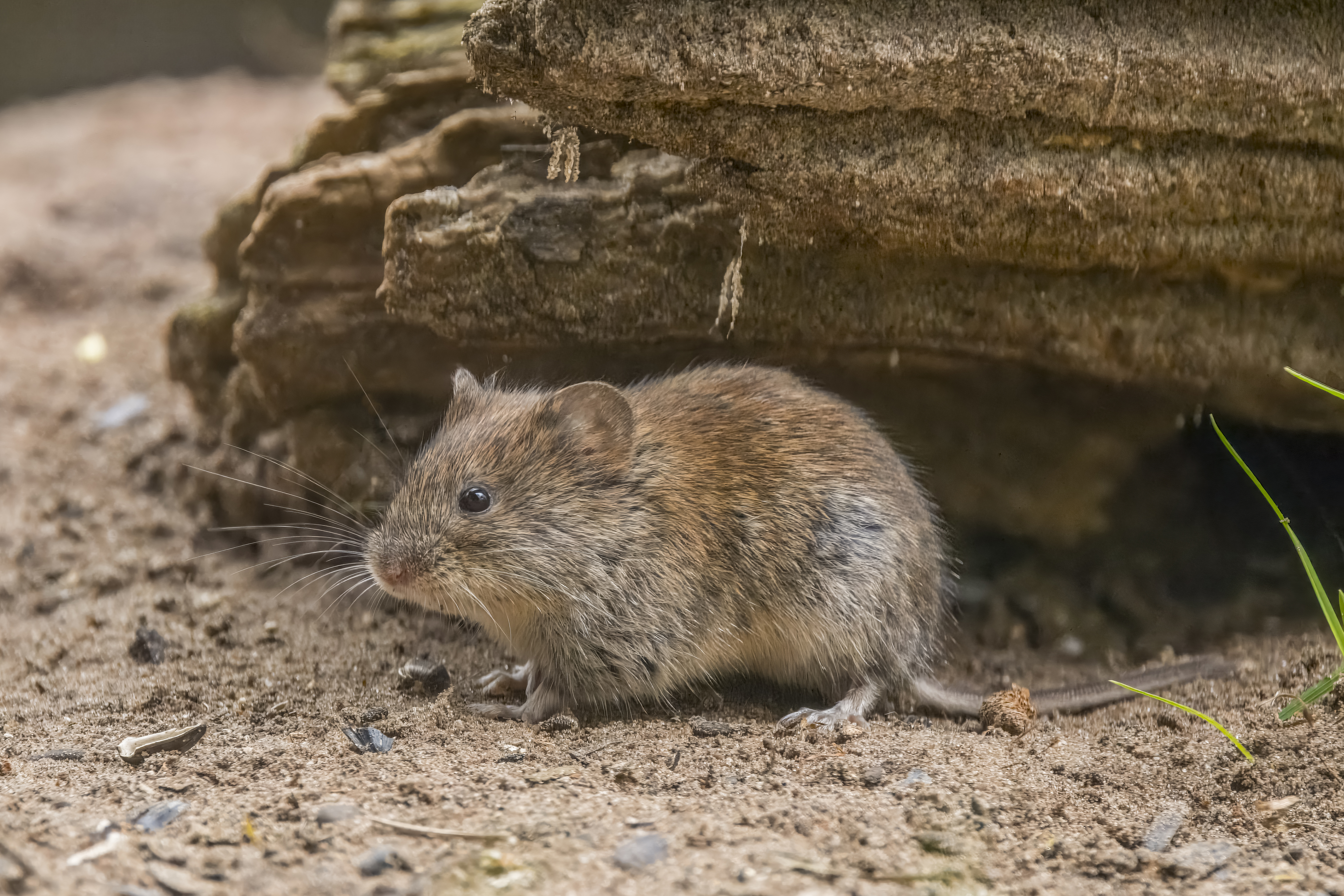
- Bank vole, C. glareolus Netherlands

Scientific classification
- Kingdom: Animalia
- Phylum: Chordata
- Class: Mammalia
- Order: Rodentia
- Family: Cricetidae
- Subfamily: Arvicolinae
- Tribe: Clethrionomyini
- Genus: Clethrionomys; G. Tilesius, 1850

Type species
- Clethrionomys rutilus Pallas, 1779

Species
- Clethrionomys californicus; Clethrionomys centralis; Clethrionomys gapperi; Clethrionomys glareolus; Clethrionomys rutilus

Synonyms
- Evotomys Coues, 1874; Phaulomys Thomas, 1905

= Clethrionomys =

Clethrionomys Temporal range: Late Pliocene–Recent

Genus of rodents

Clethrionomys is a genus of small, slender voles. In recent years the genus name was changed to Myodes, however a 2019 paper found that Myodes was actually a junior synonym for Lemmus, thus making it unusable. As such, Clethrionomys is re-established as the proper genus name. At the same time, several species were moved to the genus Craseomys, so members of both genera are referred to as red-backed voles. This genus was described by Johannes von Nepomuk Franz Xaver Gistel under the pseudonym "G. Tilesius". Some authors cite the taxonomic authority as "Gistel, 1850", whereas others still use "Tilesius, 1850".

The complete list of species is:

- Western red-backed vole, Clethrionomys californicus
- Tien Shan red-backed vole, Clethrionomys centralis
- Southern red-backed vole, Clethrionomys gapperi
- Bank vole, Clethrionomys glareolus
- Northern red-backed vole, Clethrionomys rutilus
