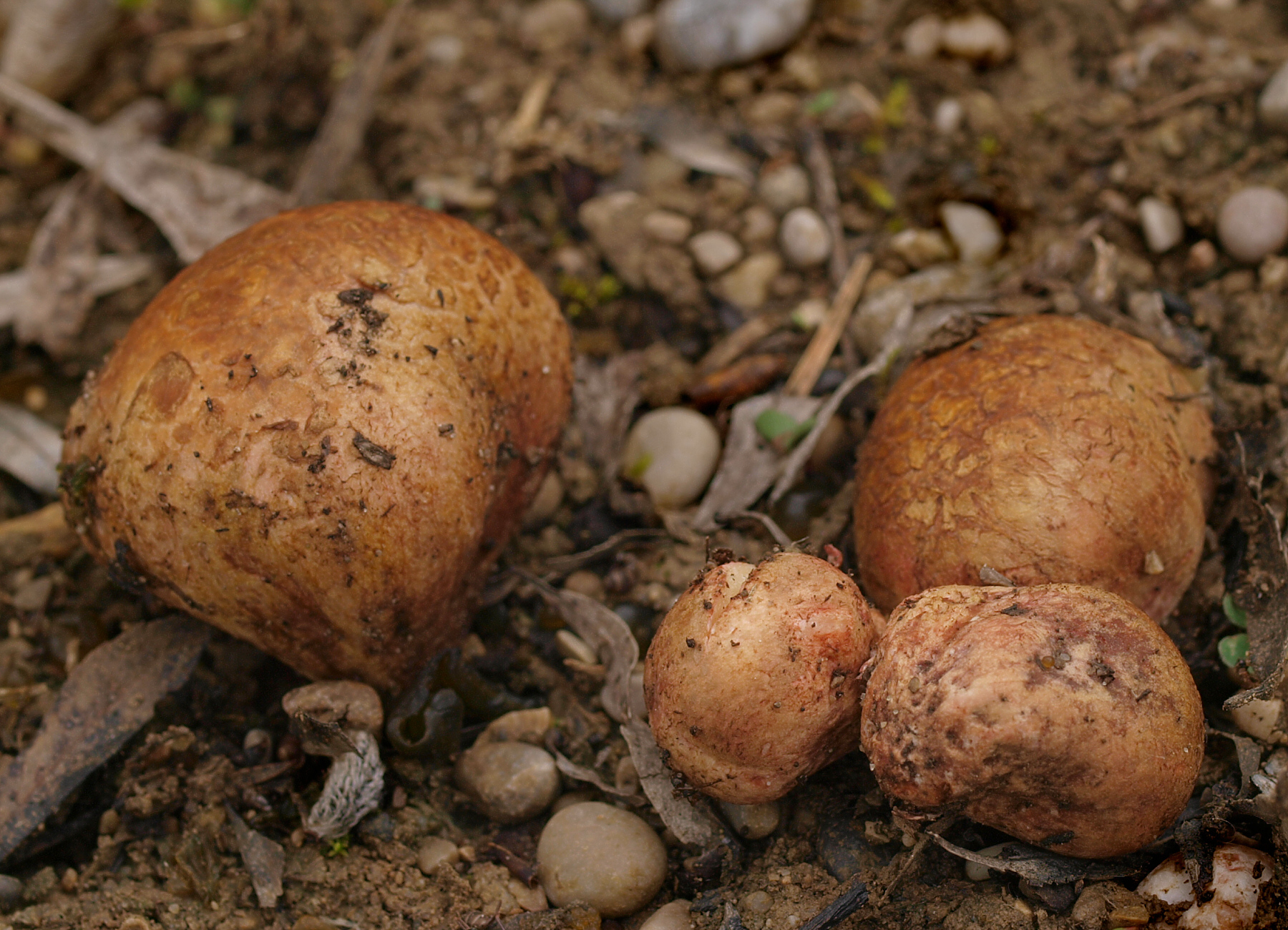
- Rhizopogon roseolus: fruiting bodies

Scientific classification
- Kingdom: Fungi
- Division: Basidiomycota
- Class: Agaricomycetes
- Order: Boletales
- Family: Rhizopogonaceae
- Genus: Rhizopogon
- Species: R. roseolus

Binomial name
- Rhizopogon roseolus (Corda) Th.Fr. (1909)

Synonyms
- Splanchnomyces roseolus Corda (1837)

= Rhizopogon roseolus =

Species of fungus

Rhizopogon roseolus Mycological characteristics
- Glebal hymenium
- No distinct cap
- Hymenium attachment is not applicable
- Lacks a stipe
- Ecology is mycorrhizal
- Edibility is choice

Rhizopogon roseolus, shōro (Japanese: 松露/ショウロ), is a species of ectomycorrhizal fungus. It is considered a delicacy in Japan.

== Description ==
The fruiting bodies are approximately spherical to elongated, often pear-shaped. Their diameter is up to 3 centimetres (1 1/4 in) in dry specimens. Their color is initially white, but soon turns pink to reddish-brownish, sometimes also delicately violet-pink. At their base are root-like strands of mycelium. They give off a faint odor. There are numerous fine elastic fibrils or veins, which are not prominent and are colored the same as the peridium or darker. This is 240–400 μm thick and single-layered.

The gleba is initially white and becomes yellowish as it dries. The cavities within are labyrinthine, empty or filled with spores where small. They are formed by hyaline (transparent), branched hyphae. The basidia are club-shaped and hyaline, measuring 12–13 by 9–10 μm. The sterigmata are as long as the spores, which are uniquely colored, some ocher-tawny, smooth, and ellipsoidal in shape; they measure 7–16 by 3–5 μm. Since the basidia have lost the function of actively ejecting spores, the spores are dispersed not only by rainwater washing away the matured and viscous fruiting body fragments but also by insects and other animals.

== Distribution and ecology ==
Rhizopogon roseolus is considered a cosmopolite species, distributed in Europe, North America and northeastern Asia. It has also been artificially introduced into New Zealand as an edible fungus. The fungus lives by forming ectomycorrhizae with pine trees. It has characteristics similar to those of the pioneer plants, and often appears when the typical pioneer plants settle in areas that have been subjected to strong disturbance. In Europe it grows under Pinus nigra on calcareous soil, and it forms fruiting bodies from August to November. In Japan, it is found under pine trees such as Pinus densiflora and Pinus thunbergii and has been recorded in Honshu, Shikoku, and Kyushu.

It has a bipolar mating system.

== Uses ==
It is considered a delicacy in Japan, where it is known as shōro. Immature fruiting bodies that are still pure white inside are considered the best, and they are commonly called komeshōro (米松露/コメショウロ). After washing thoroughly with a diluted salt solution to remove debris, it is generally used as a vegetable for soup, grilled with salt, and as an ingredient in chawanmushi.

Techniques for the commercial cultivation of this fungus in pine plantations have been developed and applied with successful results in Japan and New Zealand. The fungus is used as a soil inoculant in agriculture and horticulture.
