= False truffle =

Type of fungus with underground fruiting bodies resembling truffles

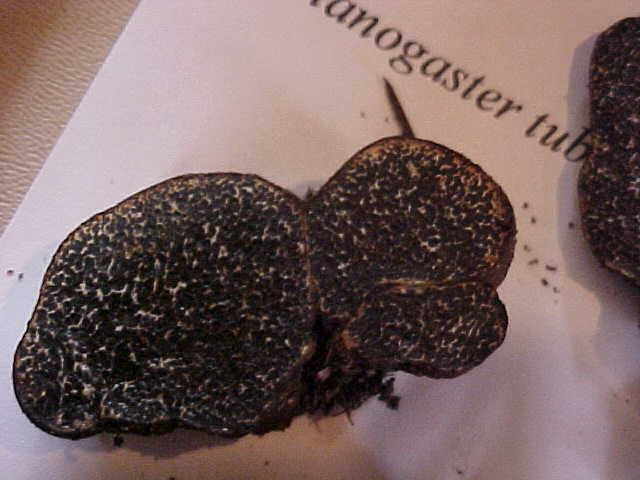
Melanogaster tuberiformis, a false truffle of the genus Melanogaster.

A false truffle or a hymenogastrale is any species of fungus that has underground fruiting bodies that produce basidiocarps resembling the true truffles of genus Tuber. While rodents such as squirrels eat a wide variety of false truffle species, many are considered toxic (Scleroderma species) or otherwise unpalatable and only a few are sought after as food for humans.

The rodents exist in an almost symbiotic relationship with the false truffle. The false truffle depends on the rodents to help spread its spores as it does not have the ability to eject the spores themselves. The rodents are attracted to a scent produced by the false truffle and ingest the spores. Spores survive the intestinal tract of the rodents and are excreted in the fecal matter ready to germinate. During the evolutionary period of the false truffle it lost its mushroom cap shape and closed up to protect the spores from dryer or harsher conditions. As a result it lost the ability to discharge its spores, hence the need for animal spore distribution. It is thought that false truffles and truffles evolved to grow beneath the surface because of changing conditions on the surface. Because fungus is sensitive to moisture and temperature, it makes sense that one strategy of survival would be to go underground where the moisture content is more stable. The stipe also dramatically shortened because it no longer needed the length to help with spore dispersal; as a result, some species either lost the stipe or is still found inside the false truffles. Similar in appearance to true truffles, which are ascomycetes, false truffles are basidiomycetes. Different false truffle lineage can be traced to agarics, russulas, boletes, and chanterelles.

All false truffles have a symbiotic mycorrhizal relationship with the trees and shrubs they coexist with: the trees give them sugars and they provide the trees with more water and nutrients. Whereas the interior of the true truffle is marbled and solid, the interior of the false truffle is mostly not marbled like the true truffle, but instead most have a pulp-like interior. Some species have a black-and-white appearance or a brown color; other species have a white interior. The interior differs according to species. Although there are no known poisonous species of false truffle, many are unpalatable.
