= Basidiocarp =

Fungal structure

Schematic representations of a typical basidiocarp (left to right): a fruiting body, hymenium and basidia

In fungi, a basidiocarp, basidiome, or basidioma (pl. basidiomata) is the sporocarp of a basidiomycete, the multicellular structure on which the spore-producing hymenium is borne. Basidiocarps are characteristic of the hymenomycetes; rusts and smuts do not produce such structures. As with other sporocarps, epigeous (above-ground) basidiocarps that are visible to the naked eye (especially those with a more or less agaricoid morphology) are commonly referred to as mushrooms, while hypogeous (underground) basidiocarps are usually called false truffles.

== Structure ==
All basidiocarps serve as the structure on which the hymenium is produced. Basidia are found on the surface of the hymenium, and the basidia ultimately produce spores. In its simplest form, a basidiocarp consists of an undifferentiated fruiting structure with a hymenium on the surface; such a structure is characteristic of many simple jelly and club fungi. In more complex basidiocarps, there is differentiation into a stipe, a pileus, and/or various types of hymenophores.

== Types ==
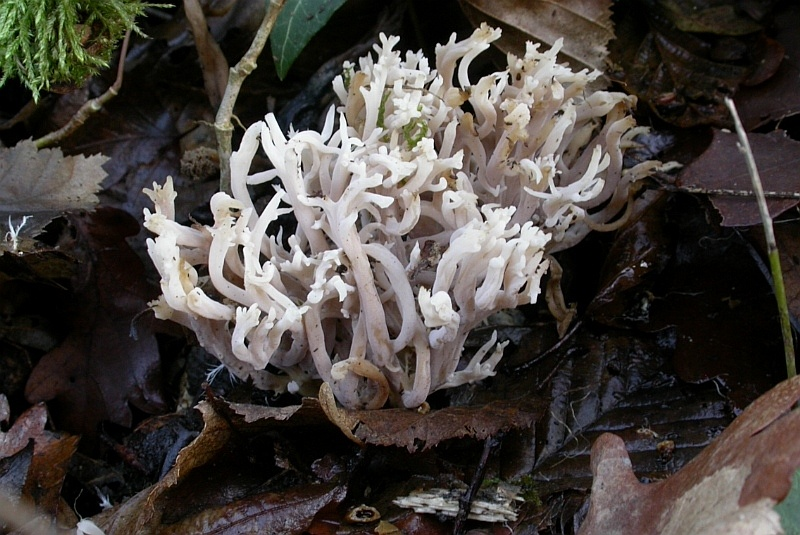
Basidiocarps of Ramaria rugosa, a coral fungus

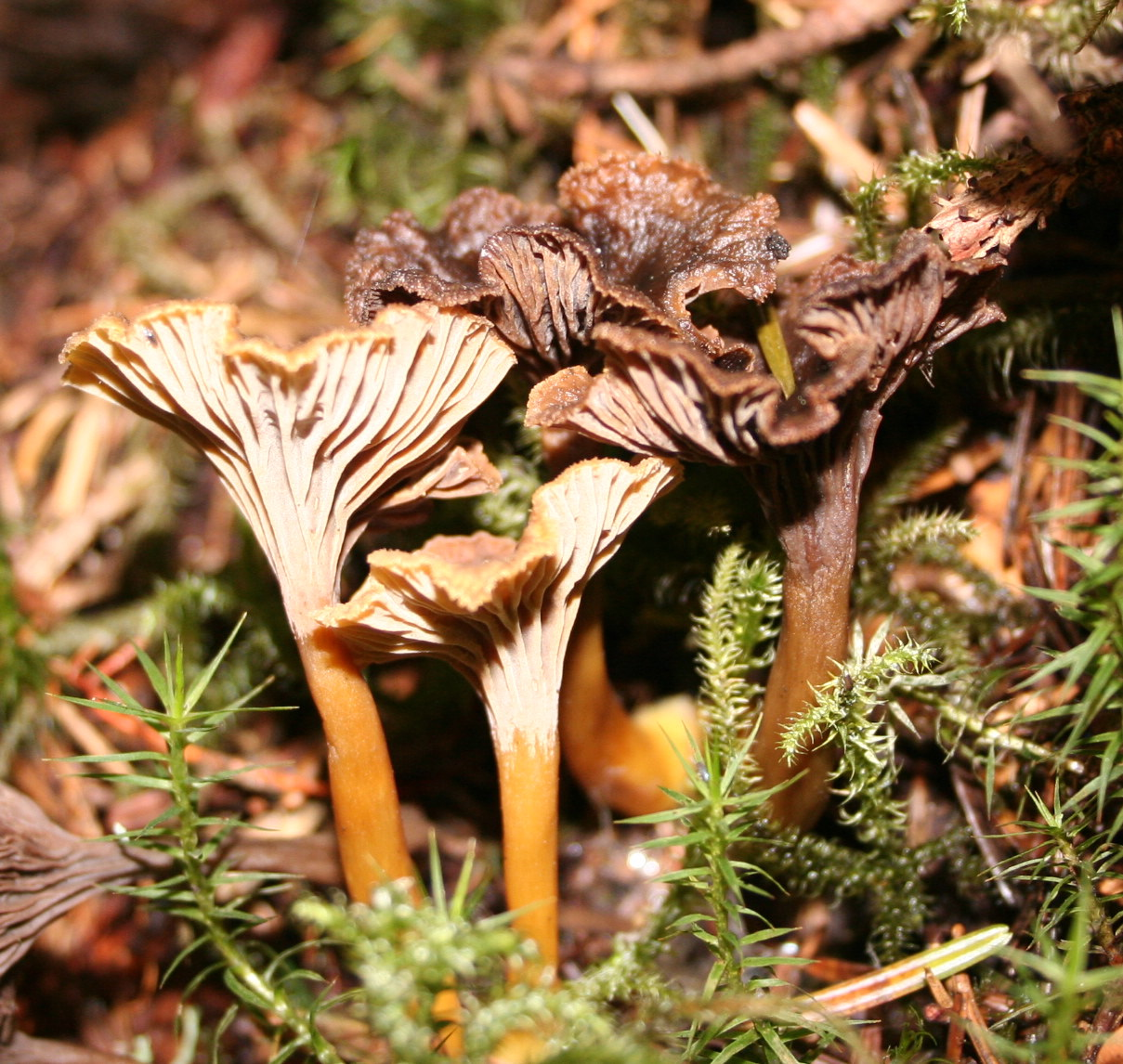
Basidiocarps of Craterellus tubaeformis, a cantharelloid fungus

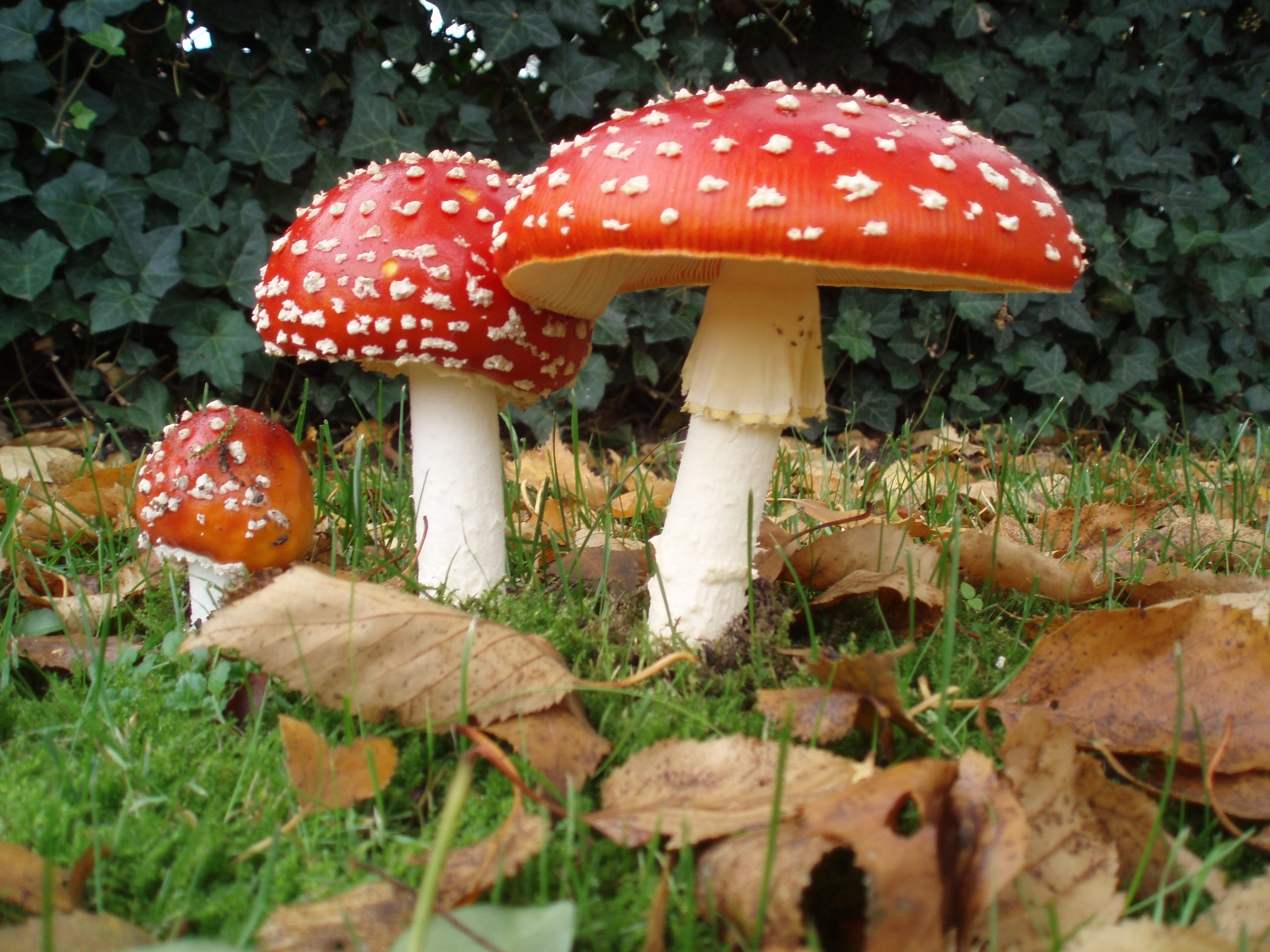
Basidiocarps of Amanita muscaria, an agaric

Basidiocarps are classified into various types of growth forms based on the degree of differentiation into a stipe, pileus, and hymenophore, as well as the type of hymenophore, if present.

Growth forms include:

- Jelly fungus – fruiting body is jelly-like.
- Club fungus and coral fungus – erect fruiting body without a distinct stalk and cap, either unbranched (club fungus) or profusely branched (coral fungus).
- Polypore – underside of the fruiting body usually consists of tubes; otherwise very variable, usually wood-inhabiting
- tooth fungus or hydnoid fungus – underside of the fruiting body composed of spines or teeth
- Corticioid fungus – the underside of the fruiting body is usually smooth or with spines (vs. hydnoid fungi) but not poroid nor gilled; typically effused without caps
- Cantharelloid fungus – fruiting body with shallow fold-like gills running over most of the lower surface of the fruiting body and not much differentiation between the stalk and cap.
- Gasteromycete or "gastroid fungus" – fruiting body has a ball-like shape and in which the hymenophore has become entirely enclosed on the inside of the fruiting body.
- False truffle – like a gasteromycete, however, but with a hypogeous (underground) fruiting body.
- Secotioid fungus – like a gasteromycete, but with a stalk. Thought to be an evolutionarily intermediate stage between a gasteromycete and an agaric.
- Agaric or gill fungi – fruiting body with caps, gills, and (usually) a stalk.
- Bolete – fleshy fruiting body with a cap, a stalk, and tubes on the underside.

Basic divisions of Agaricomycotina were formerly based entirely upon the growth form of the mushroom. Molecular phylogenetic investigation (as well as supporting evidence from micromorphology and chemotaxonomy) has since demonstrated that similar types of basidiomycete growth form are often examples of convergent evolution and do not always reflect a close relationship between different groups of fungi. For example, agarics have arisen independently in the Agaricales, the Boletales, the Russulales, and other groups, while secotioid fungi and false truffles have arisen independently many times just within the Agaricales.

== See also ==
- Ascocarp
- Conidium
