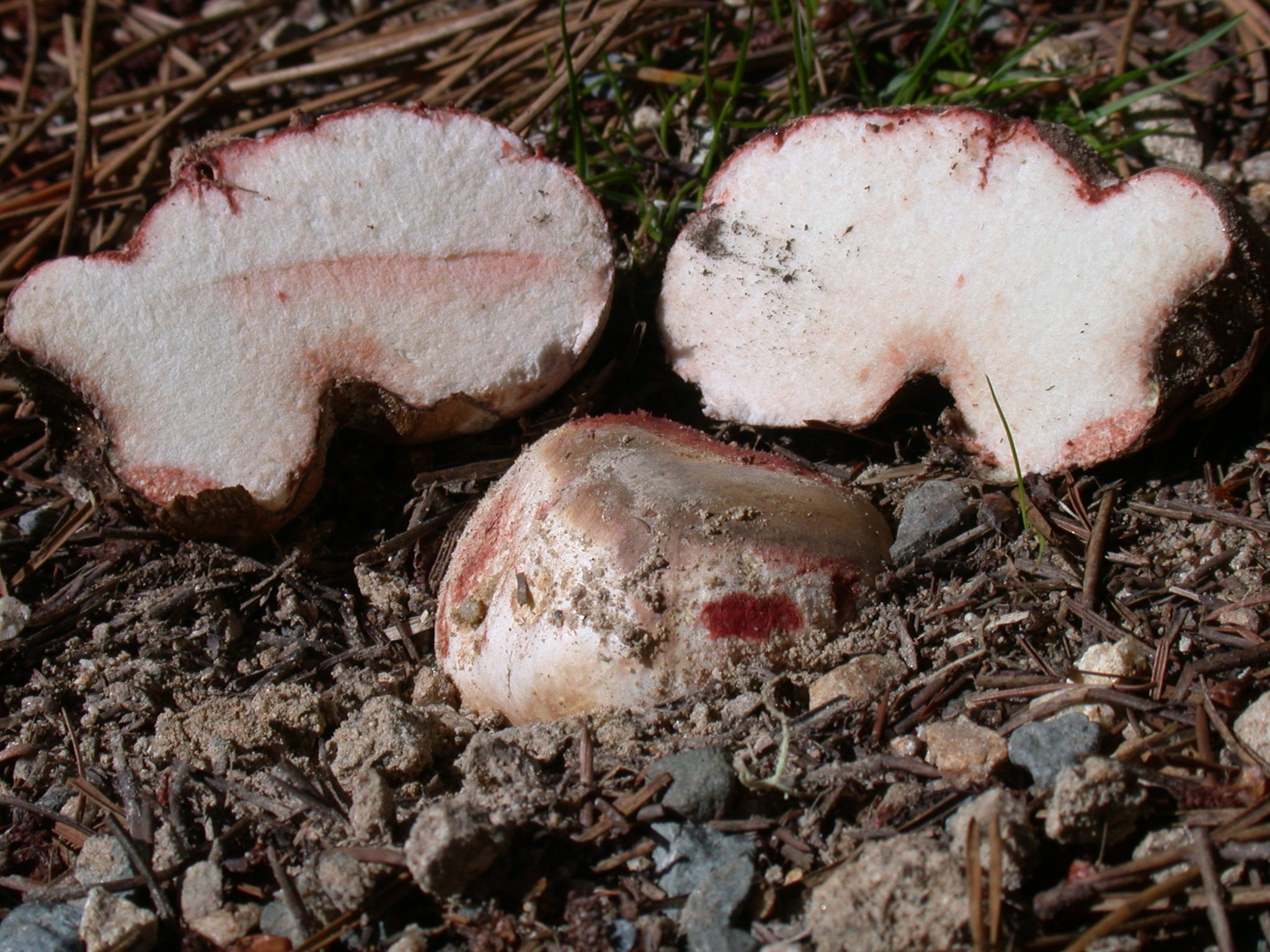
- Rhizopogon rubescens

Scientific classification
- Kingdom: Fungi
- Division: Basidiomycota
- Class: Agaricomycetes
- Order: Boletales
- Suborder: Suillineae
- Family: Rhizopogonaceae; Gäum. & C.W.Dodge (1928)

Type genus
- Rhizopogon Fr. & Nordholm

Genera
- Rhizopogon; Rhopalogaster

= Rhizopogonaceae =

Family of fungi

The Rhizopogonaceae are a family of fungi in the order Boletales. The family, first named and described by botanists Ernst Albert Gäumann and Carroll William Dodge in 1928, contains 2 genera and 151 species. The genus Fevansia, formerly thought to belong in the Rhizopogonaceae, was found to belong in the Albatrellaceae in a molecular phylogenetics study.
