= List of Canadian plants by family M =

Main page: List of Canadian plants by family

The following families of vascular plants are listed as occurring in Canada:

For mosses of Canada, see:

== Magnoliaceae ==
- Liriodendron tulipifera — tulip-tree
- Magnolia acuminata — cucumber magnolia

== Malvaceae ==
- Hibiscus moscheutos — swamp rosemallow
- Iliamna rivularis — streambank globemallow
- Sida hermaphrodita — Virginia mallow
- Sidalcea campestris — meadow checkermallow
- Sidalcea hendersonii — Henderson's checkermallow
- Sidalcea oregana — Oregon checkermallow
- Sphaeralcea coccinea — red globemallow
- Sphaeralcea munroana — whitestem globemallow

== Marchantiaceae ==
- Marchantia alpestris
- Marchantia polymorpha
- Marchantia quadrata
- Marchantia romanica

== Marsileaceae ==
- Marsilea vestita — hairy water fern

== Meesiaceae ==
- Amblyodon dealbatus
- Meesia longiseta
- Meesia triquetra
- Meesia uliginosa
- Paludella squarrosa

== Melastomataceae ==
- Rhexia virginica — Virginia meadowbeauty

== Menispermaceae ==
- Menispermum canadense — Canada moonseed

== Menyanthaceae ==
- Fauria crista-galli — deer-cabbage
- Menyanthes trifoliata — bog buckbean
- Nymphoides cordata — little floatingheart

== Metzgeriaceae ==
- Apometzgeria pubescens
- Metzgeria conjugata
- Metzgeria furcata
- Metzgeria myriopoda

== Mniaceae ==
- Cinclidium arcticum
- Cinclidium latifolium
- Cinclidium stygium
- Cinclidium subrotundum
- Cyrtomnium hymenophylloides
- Cyrtomnium hymenophyllum
- Leucolepis acanthoneuron
- Mnium ambiguum
- Mnium arizonicum
- Mnium blyttii
- Mnium hornum
- Mnium marginatum — olive-green calcareous moss
- Mnium spinulosum
- Mnium stellare
- Mnium thomsonii
- Plagiomnium ciliare
- Plagiomnium cuspidatum — toothed plagiomnium moss
- Plagiomnium drummondii
- Plagiomnium ellipticum
- Plagiomnium insigne
- Plagiomnium medium
- Plagiomnium rostratum
- Plagiomnium venustum
- Pseudobryum cinclidioides
- Rhizomnium andrewsianum
- Rhizomnium appalachianum — Appalachian rhizomnium moss
- Rhizomnium glabrescens
- Rhizomnium gracile
- Rhizomnium magnifolium — grandleaf rhizomnium moss
- Rhizomnium nudum
- Rhizomnium pseudopunctatum — felt round moss
- Rhizomnium punctatum — rhizomnium moss

== Molluginaceae ==
- Mollugo verticillata — green carpetweed

== Monotropaceae ==
- Allotropa virgata — sugarstick
- Hemitomes congestum — gnome-plant
- Monotropa hypopithys — American pinesap
- Monotropa uniflora — Indian-pipe
- Pleuricospora fimbriolata — fringed pinesap
- Pterospora andromedea — giant pinedrops

== Moraceae ==
- Morus rubra — red mulberry

== Myricaceae ==
- Comptonia peregrina — sweet-fern
- Morella californica — California bayberry
- Morella pensylvanica — northern bayberry
- Myrica gale — sweet gale

== Myriniaceae ==
- Myrinia pulvinata
- Schwetschkeopsis fabronia
