= Pohlia scotica =

Scottish threadmoss

Scientific classification
- Kingdom: Plantae
- Division: Bryophyta
- Class: Bryopsida
- Subclass: Bryidae
- Order: Bryales
- Family: Mniaceae
- Genus: Pohlia
- Species: P. scotica

Binomial name
- Pohlia scotica Crundw.

Species of moss

Pohlia scotica, commonly known as Scottish threadmoss, is a moss endemic to Scotland. The earliest records date to 1964 and this moss was recognised as a distinct species in 1982. The largest populations are in Argyll with smaller populations in Dunbartonshire and Easter Ross. Its favoured habitat is silt, sand and gravel subject to regular inundation. The species has been provisionally classified as Lower Risk (Near threatened) and receives protection under the Wildlife and Countryside Act 1981.
