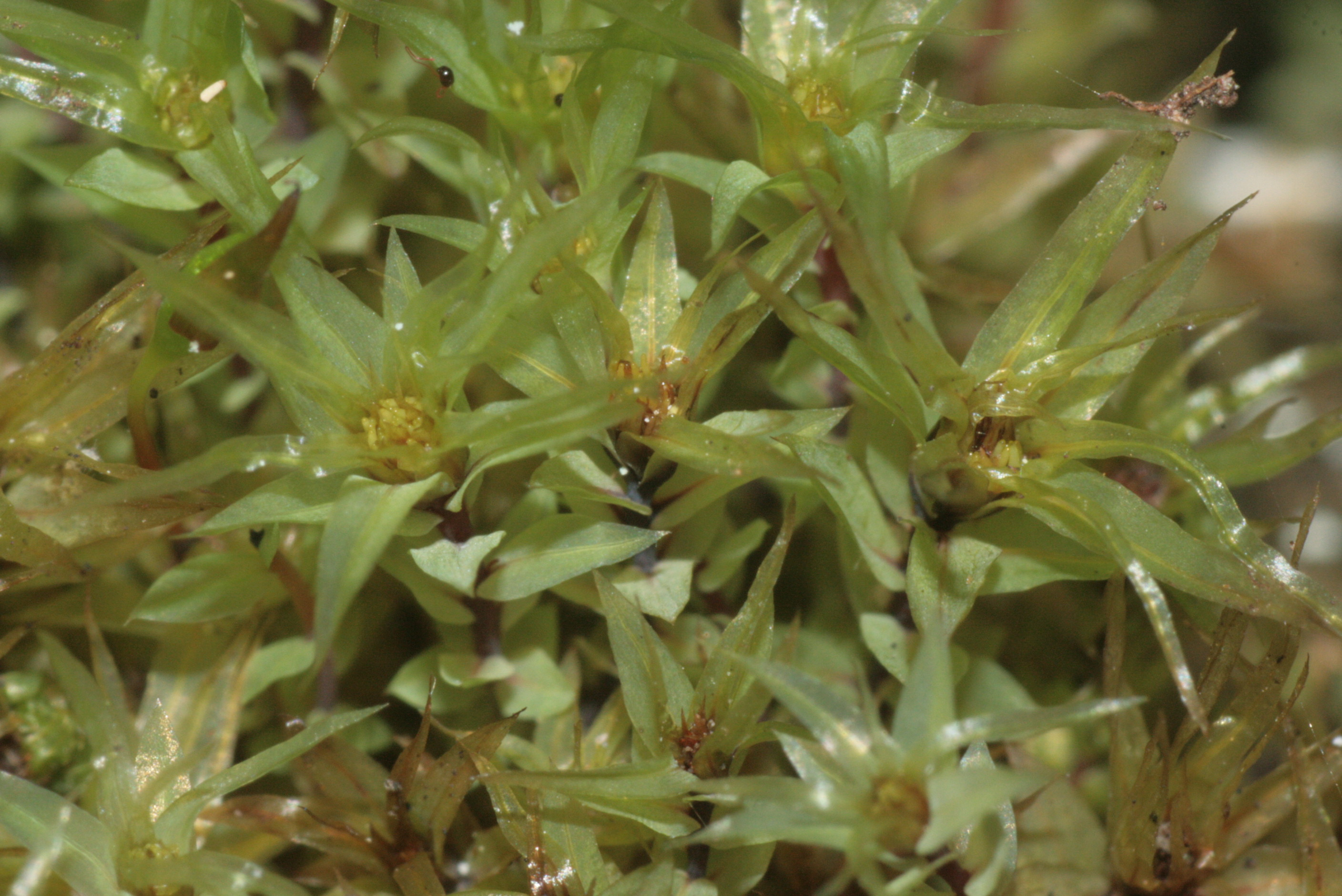

Scientific classification
- Kingdom: Plantae
- Division: Bryophyta
- Class: Bryopsida
- Subclass: Bryidae
- Order: Bryales
- Family: Mniaceae
- Genus: Pohlia
- Species: P. cruda

Binomial name
- Pohlia cruda Lindberg, 1879

= Pohlia cruda =

Species of moss

Pohlia cruda is a species of moss belonging to the family Bryaceae.

It has cosmopolitan distribution.
