= Cinclidium =

Cinclidium is the scientific name of two genera and may refer to:

- Cinclidium (bird), a genus of birds in the family Muscicapidae
- Cinclidium (plant), a genus of mosses in the family Mniaceae
