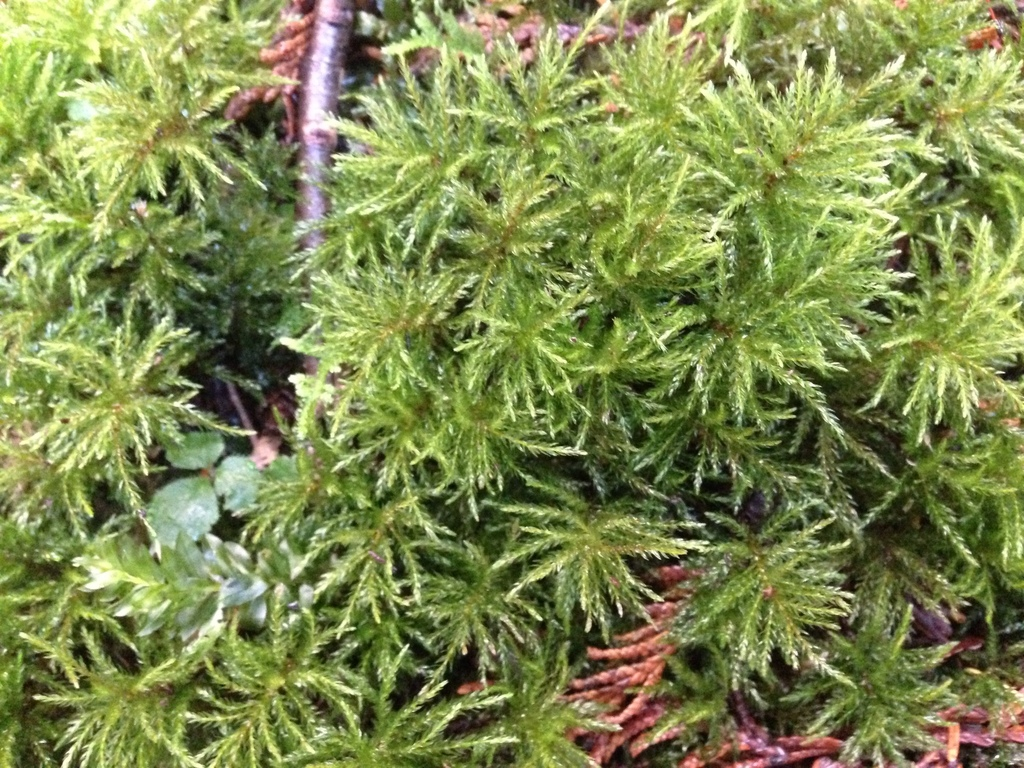

Scientific classification
- Kingdom: Plantae
- Division: Bryophyta
- Class: Bryopsida
- Subclass: Bryidae
- Order: Bryales
- Family: Mniaceae
- Genus: Leucolepis
- Species: L. acanthoneura

Binomial name
- Leucolepis acanthoneura (Schwaegr.) Lindb.
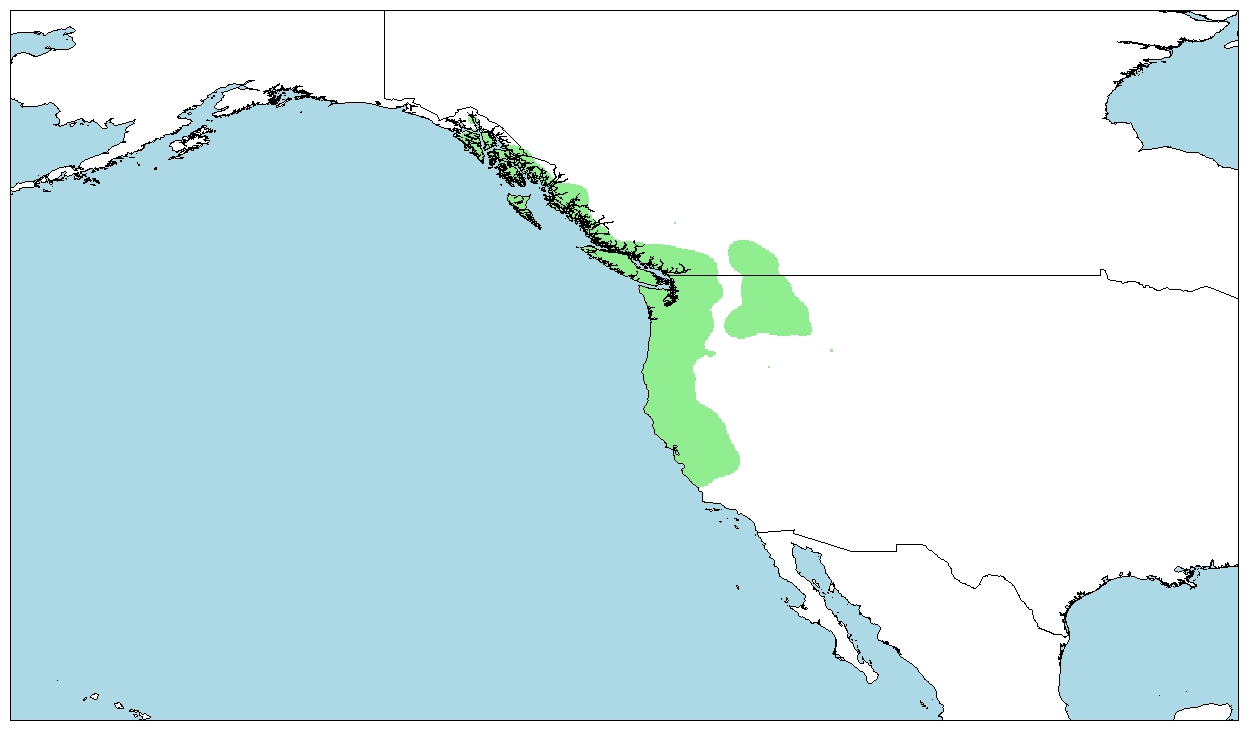

Synonyms
- Leucolepis menziesii

= Leucolepis acanthoneura =

Species of moss

Leucolepis acanthoneura is a species of moss in the family Mniaceae. It is known as leucolepis umbrella moss or Menzies' tree moss (from its synonym, Leucolepis menziesii). It is endemic to the Pacific Coast in Canada and the United States.

Leucolepis acanthoneura is found frequently in moist lowland rainforests, where it can form large populations on logs, boulders, wet organic soil, compacted soil and humus. Occasionally it extends upwards onto the lower portions of tree trunks.

The plants are light green, glossy, tree-shaped, and about 4–8 cm (1.6–3.1 in) high. The stems are upright with a circle of branches at their tips.

The Saanich people used this moss to make yellow dye for their baskets.
