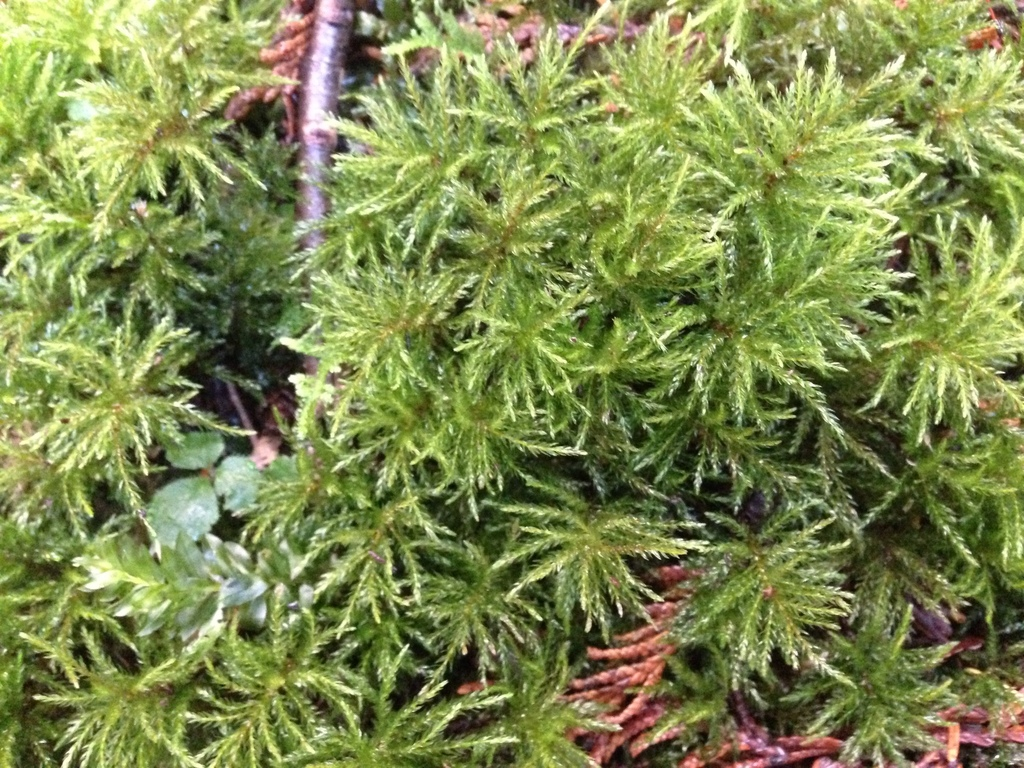
- Leucolepis acanthoneura

Scientific classification
- Kingdom: Plantae
- Division: Bryophyta
- Class: Bryopsida
- Subclass: Bryidae
- Order: Bryales
- Family: Mniaceae
- Genus: Leucolepis; T. J. Koponen

= Leucolepis =

Genus of mosses

Leucolepis is a genus of mosses in the family Mniaceae.

== Species ==
- Leucolepis acanthoneura
- Leucolepis menziesii
