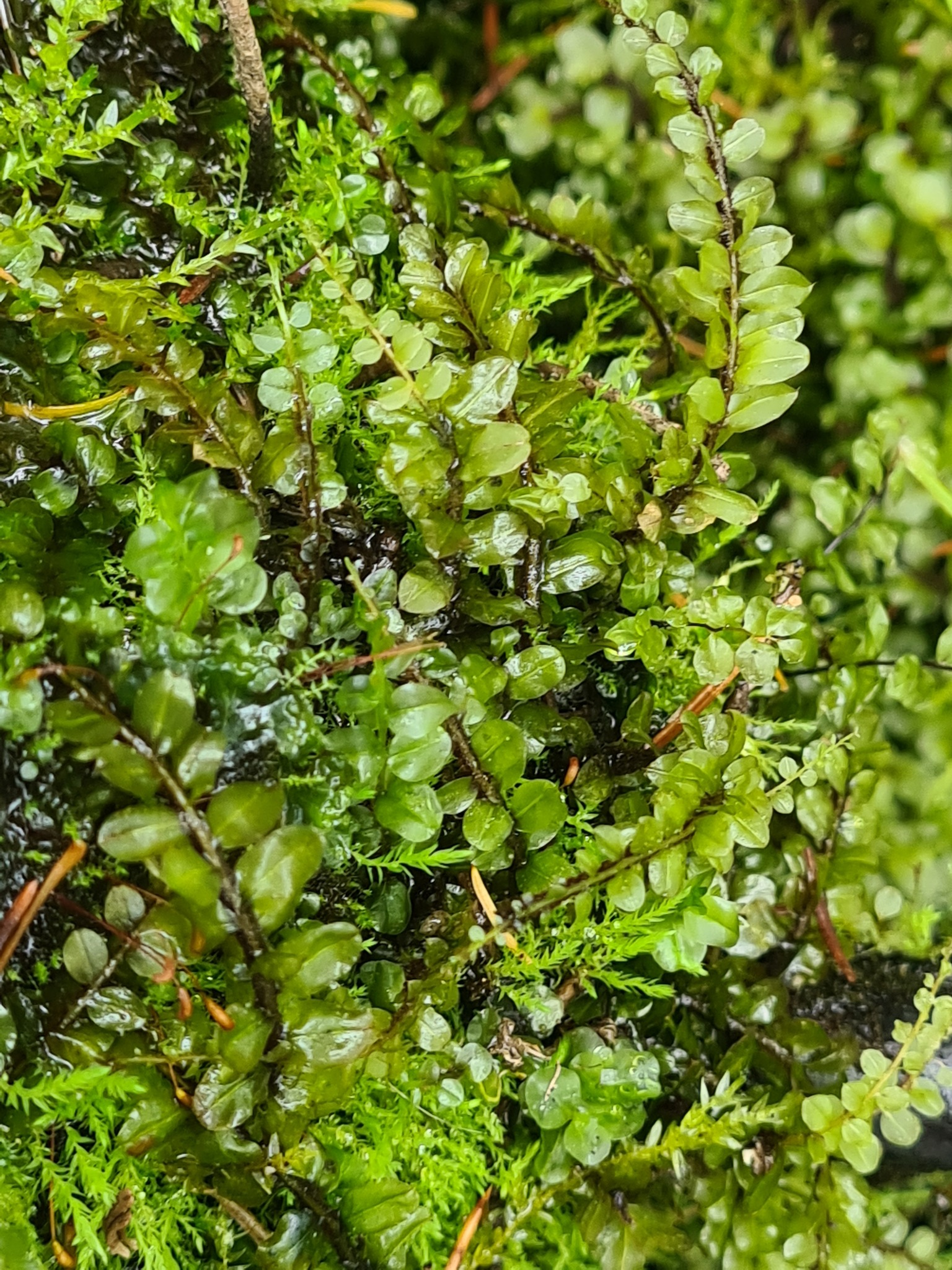
- Pseudobryum cinclidioides

Scientific classification
- Kingdom: Plantae
- Division: Bryophyta
- Class: Bryopsida
- Subclass: Bryidae
- Order: Bryales
- Family: Mniaceae
- Genus: Pseudobryum (Kindb.) T.J.Kop.

= Pseudobryum =

Genus of mosses

Pseudobryum is a genus of mosses belonging to the family Mniaceae.

Species:

- Pseudobryum cinclidioides (Huebener) T.J. Kop.
- Pseudobryum speciosum (Mitt.) T.J. Kop.
