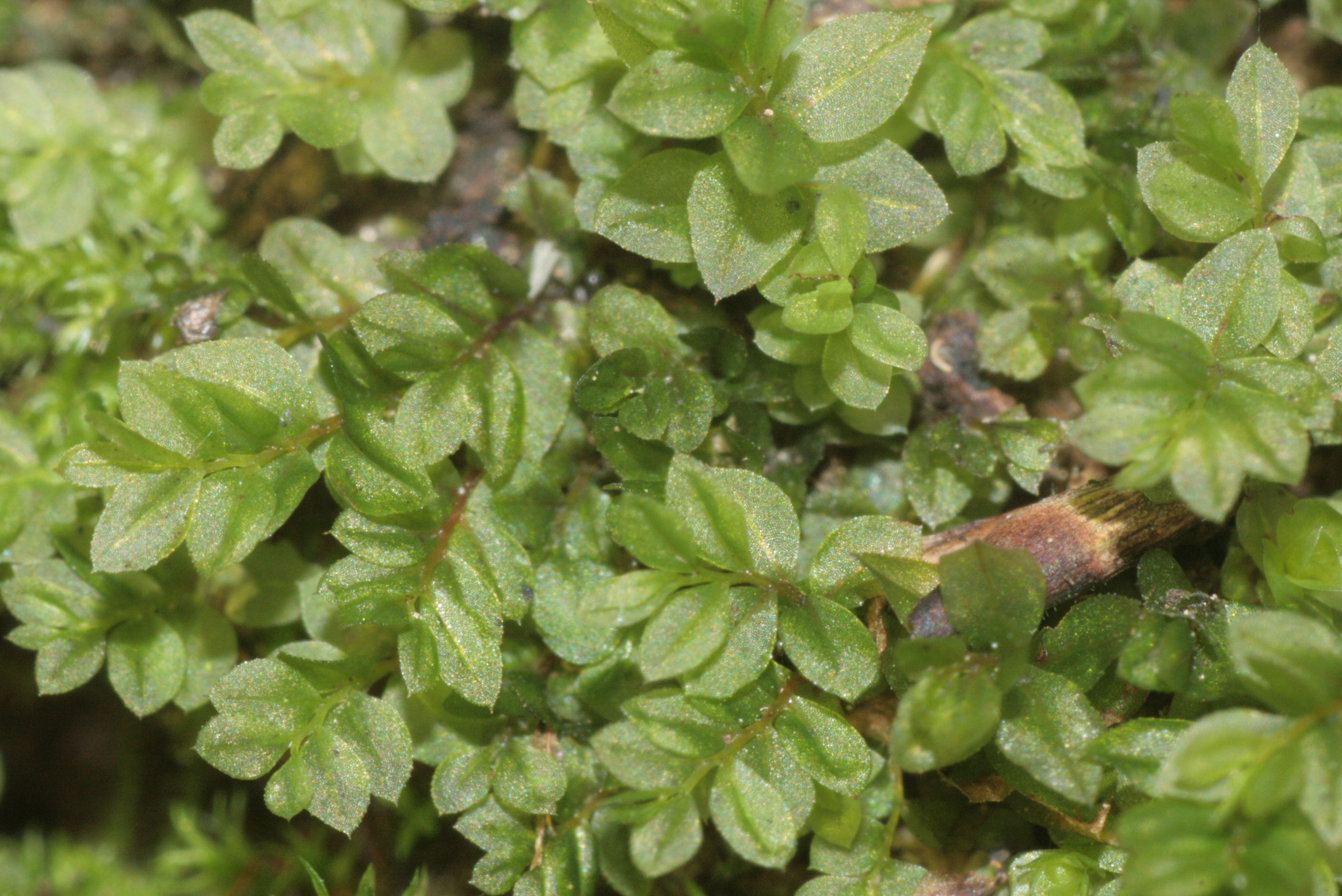
- Stellar calcareous moss

Scientific classification
- Kingdom: Plantae
- Division: Bryophyta
- Class: Bryopsida
- Subclass: Bryidae
- Order: Bryales
- Family: Mniaceae
- Genus: Mnium
- Species: M. stellare

Binomial name
- Mnium stellare Hedw.

= Mnium stellare =

Species of moss

Mnium stellare, the starry thyme-moss or stellar calcareous moss, is a moss species in the genus Mnium.
