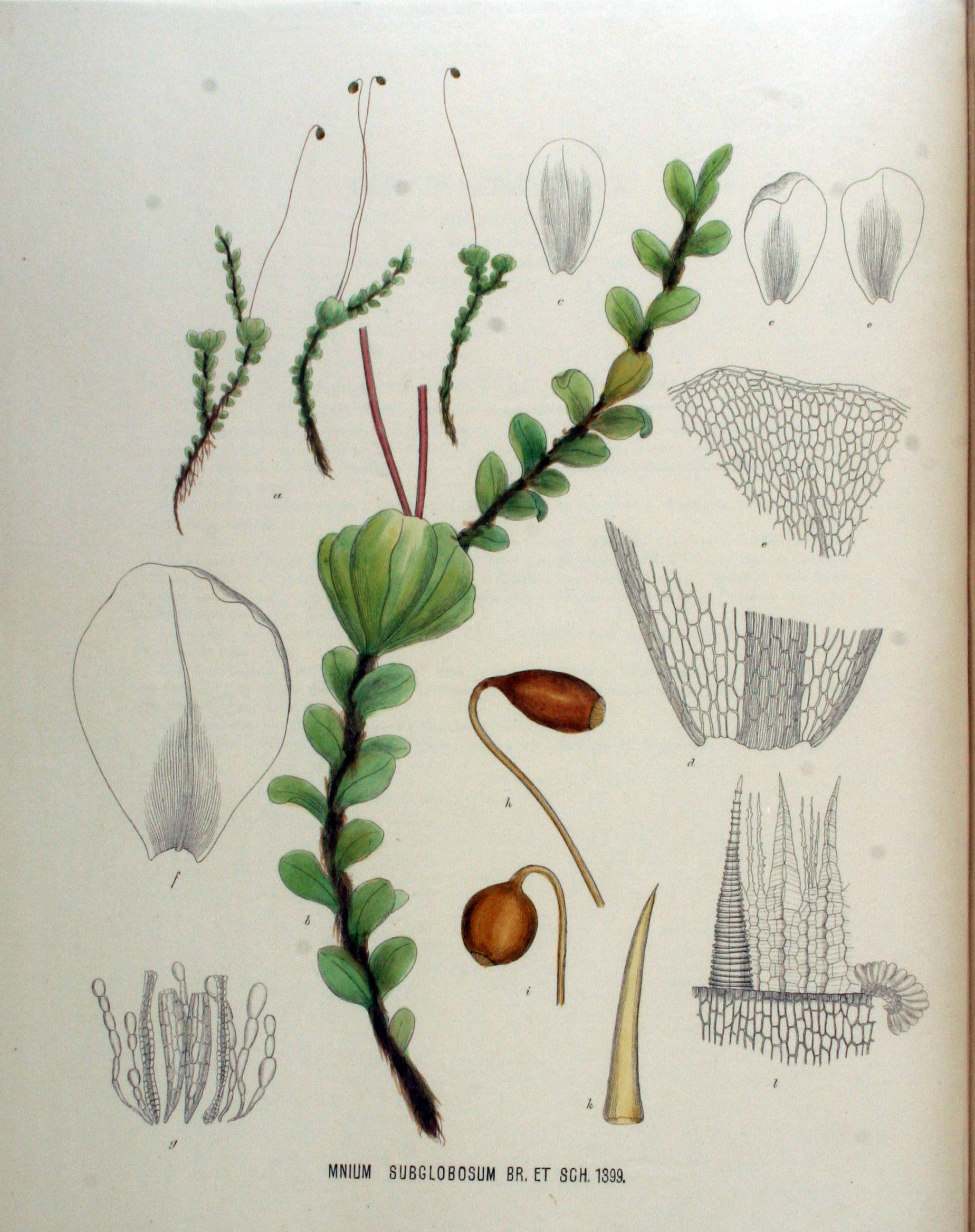

Scientific classification
- Kingdom: Plantae
- Division: Bryophyta
- Class: Bryopsida
- Subclass: Bryidae
- Order: Bryales
- Family: Mniaceae
- Genus: Rhizomnium
- Species: R. pseudopunctatum

Binomial name
- Rhizomnium pseudopunctatum T.Koponen, 1968

= Rhizomnium pseudopunctatum =

Species of moss

Rhizomnium pseudopunctatum is a species of moss belonging to the family Mniaceae.

It is native to Northern Hemisphere.
