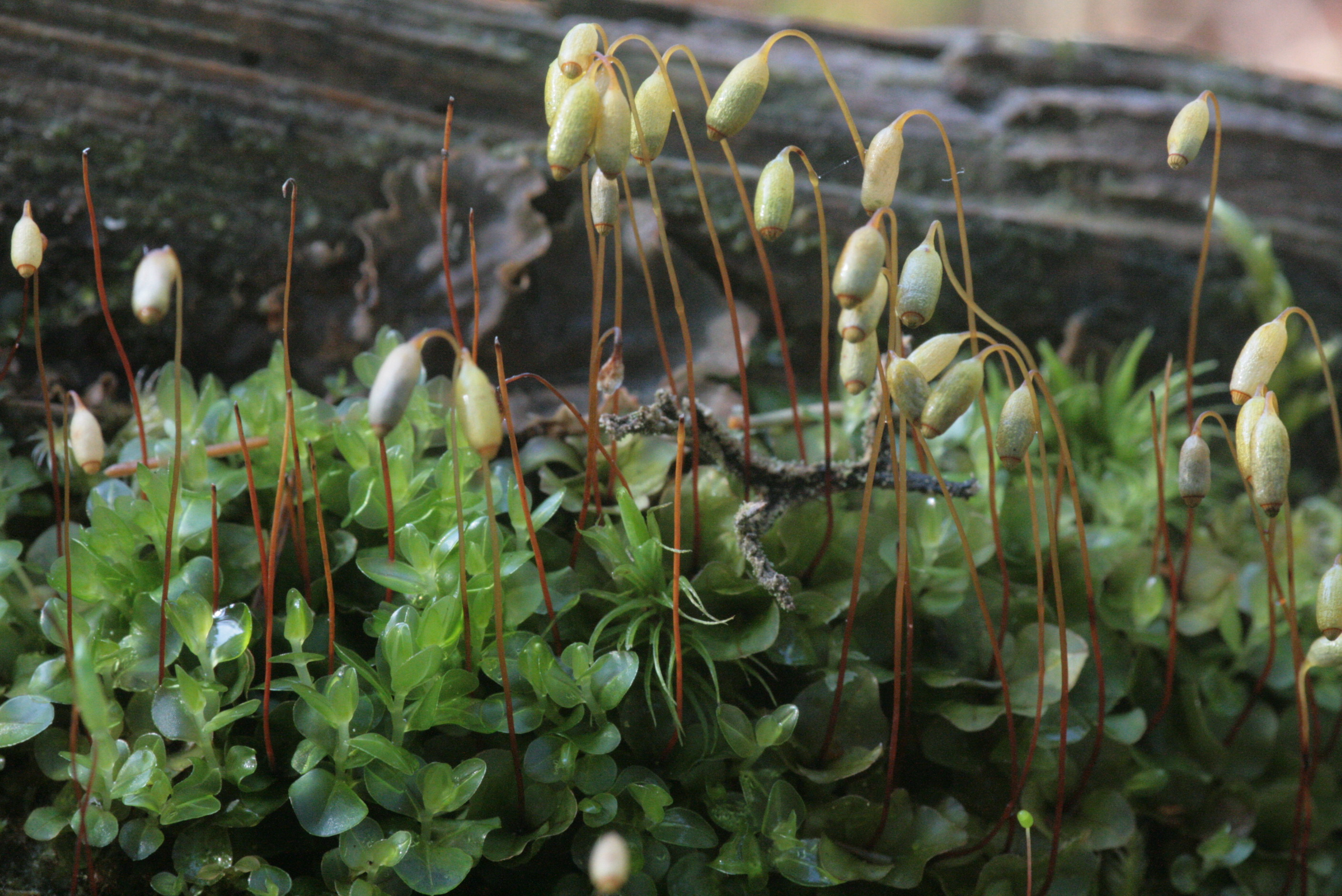

Conservation status
- Least Concern (IUCN 3.1)

Scientific classification
- Kingdom: Plantae
- Division: Bryophyta
- Class: Bryopsida
- Subclass: Bryidae
- Order: Bryales
- Family: Mniaceae
- Genus: Rhizomnium
- Species: R. punctatum

Binomial name
- Rhizomnium punctatum (Hedw.) T.J. Kop.

= Rhizomnium punctatum =

Dotted thyme-moss

Species of moss

Rhizomnium punctatum, also called dotted thyme-moss, is a small species in the genus Rhizomnium.

== Description ==
The roots, which are 10–100 mm tall, stand up straight. The oval- or egg-shaped leaves are usually broader above the middle. The rhizoids are not slender, unlike similar species R. magnifolium and R. pseudopunctatum, and they grow in the leaf axils. Capsules, measuring 5mm long, are borne on setae which are 20-30mm.

== Distribution ==
Rhizomnium punctatum is native to most of Europe and North America and is also found in the Azores and Madeira, North Africa, Turkey, the Caucasus, Iran and Asia east to Siberia.

It is found on all corners of the British Isles, although once again less frequent in Ireland. It also has a more scattered range in the East, from Cambridge north to Kingston upon Hull. It can be found on Scilly, Orkney, Shetland and the Isle of Man.
