= Rhizomnium dentatum =

Rhizomnium dentatum Temporal range: Middle Eocene

Scientific classification
- Kingdom: Plantae
- Division: Bryophyta
- Class: Bryopsida
- Subclass: Bryidae
- Order: Bryales
- Family: Mniaceae
- Genus: Rhizomnium
- Species: R. dentatum

Binomial name
- Rhizomnium dentatum Heinrichs et al, 2014

Extinct species of moss

Rhizomnium dentatum is an extinct species of moss in the family Mniaceae. The species is solely known from the Middle Eocene Baltic amber deposits in the Baltic Sea region of Europe. The genus contains a total of thirteen extant species distributed across the northern hemisphere.

== History and classification ==
Rhizomnium dentatum is known from a small group of fossil gametophyte shoots which are inclusions in a transparent chunk of Baltic amber. The amber specimen also contains seven shoots of a Pyrrhobryum species moss, three shoot fragments of a pleurocarpous, flat laying, hypnalian moss, and part of a centipede. When the fossil was described it was part of the amber collections housed in the American Museum of Natural History. The amber was recovered from fossil bearing rocks in the Baltic Sea region of Europe. Estimates of the age date between 37 million years old, for the youngest sediments and 48 million years old. This age range straddles the middle Eocene, ranging from near the beginning of the Lutetian to the beginning of the Pribonian. The holotype was first studied by a group of five researchers led by Jochen Heinrichs of LMU Munich. The research group's 2014 type description for the species was published in the paleobotany journal Review of Palaeobotany and Palynology. The specific epithet dentatum was coined as a reference to the toothed margins of the leaves.

== Description ==
The R. dentatum specimens the upper portions of a gametophyte shoots, with no lower structures preserved. Overall the stems are up to 7 mm (0.28 in) long, with a noted zig-zag structure that separates it from the described extant species. The leaves are attached at the outer angles of the stem bends. Each of the leaves are up to 2.8 mm (0.11 in) long and 1.92 mm (0.076 in) wide. Each of the leaves is oval to oblong, with a margin that is smooth to sparsely toothed.
