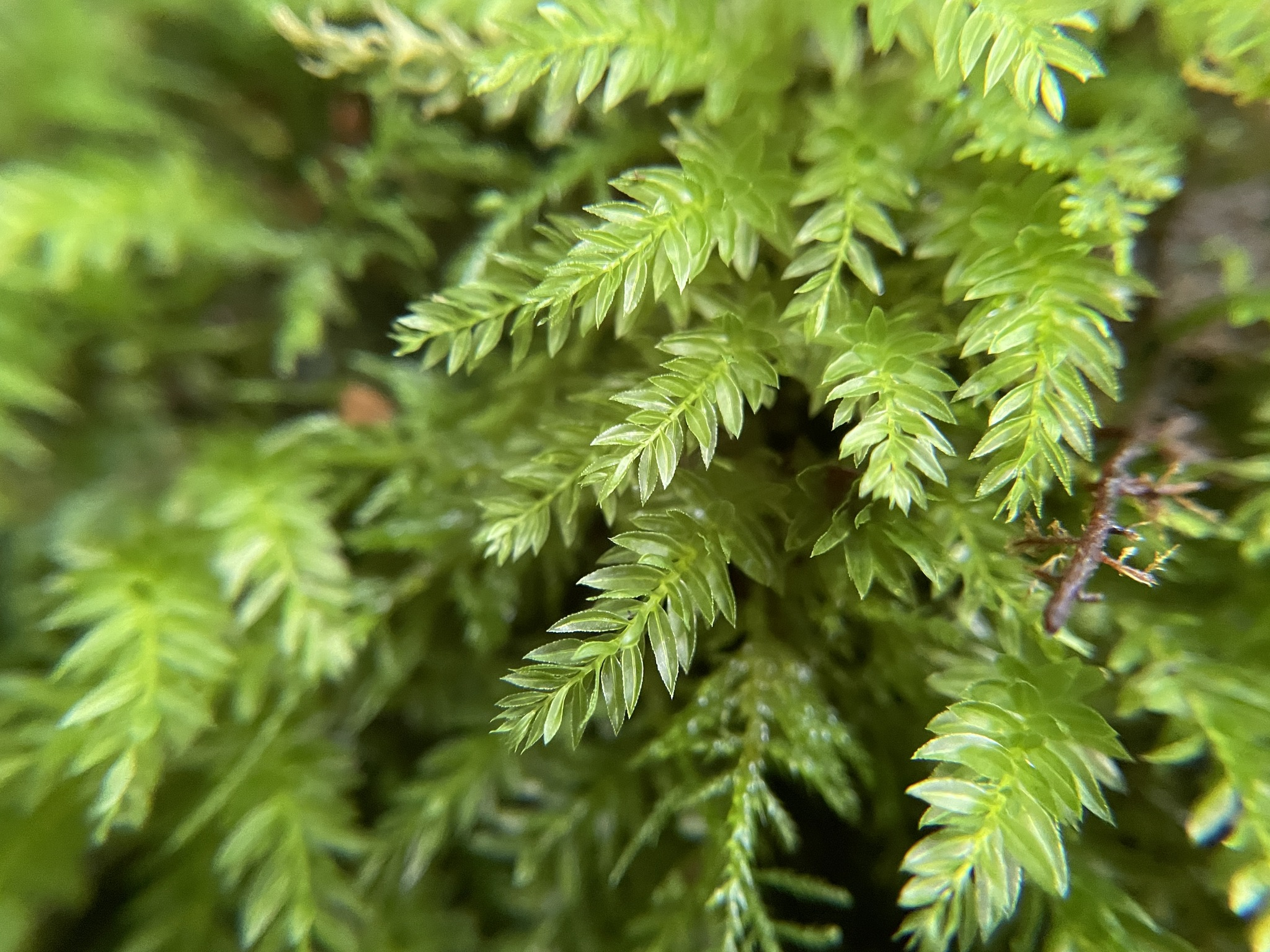

Scientific classification
- Kingdom: Plantae
- Clade: Embryophytes
- Division: Bryophyta
- Class: Bryopsida
- Subclass: Bryidae
- Order: Bryales
- Family: Mniaceae
- Genus: Mnium
- Species: M. hornum

Binomial name
- Mnium hornum Hedwig, 1801

= Mnium hornum =

Species of moss

Mnium hornum, also known by the common names horn calcareous moss or swan's-neck thyme-moss, is a species of moss in the genus Mnium.

== Description ==
The upright stems of swan's-neck thyme-moss are 2 to 4 cm tall. Leaves are 4mm to 8mm long, with a toothed border of long, narrow cells. The vein ends a slightly below the tip of the leaf. The lower part of the stem has small, narrow triangular leaves. Capsules are 5mm long, with a lid that narrows abruptly into a short point. The seta is between 2.5 and 5 cm long.

== Habitat ==
Swan's-neck thyme-moss is native to Europe and eastern North America. It is commonly found in damp woodland conditions, especially in acidic soil, such as oak-birch, beech and pine woodlands. It is found on the ground, logs, rocks, tree bases and along streams.

== Uses ==
In 2012, researchers in Serbia found that Mnium hornum could be used as a potential source of arachidonic acid.
