= Pincushion moss =

Pincushion moss may refer to several different species of plants, including:

- Dicranoweisia crispula, the mountain pincushion
- Borya sphaerocephala
- Leptostomum inclinans
- Leucobryum glaucum
