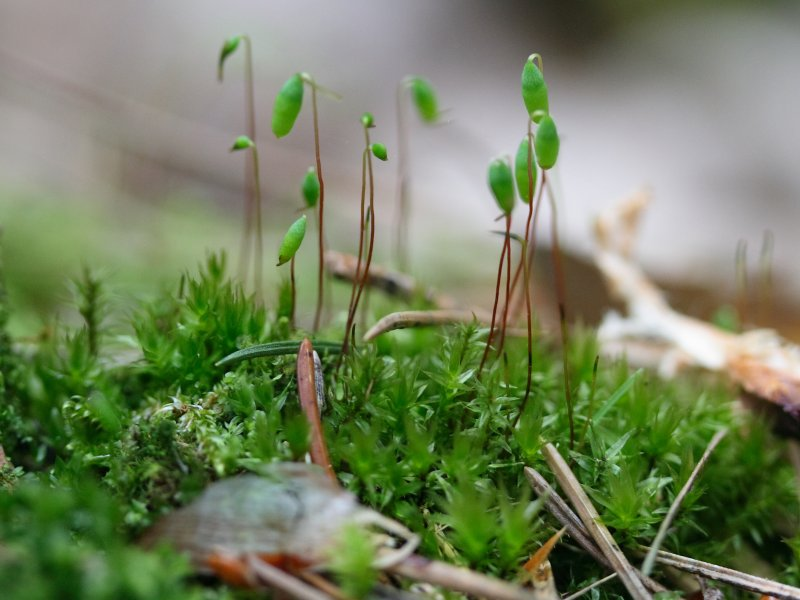
- Pohlia nutans

Scientific classification
- Kingdom: Plantae
- Division: Bryophyta
- Class: Bryopsida
- Subclass: Bryidae
- Order: Bryales
- Family: Mniaceae
- Genus: Pohlia; Hedw.

Species
- See text

= Pohlia =

Genus of Mniaceae plants

Pohlia is a genus of mosses in the family Mniaceae, found on all continents including Antarctica. Some of its species are native to multiple continents. The center of diversity is the Northern Hemisphere.

The genus name of Pohlia is in honour of Johann Ehrenfried Pohl (1746–1800), who was a German physician and botanist.

The genus was circumscribed by Johann Hedwig in Descriptio et Adumbratio microscopio-analytica Muscorum Frondosorum vol.1 on page 98 in 1785-1787.

== Species ==
Currently accepted species include:

- Pohlia afrocruda (Müll.Hal.) Broth.
- Pohlia alba Lindb. & Arnell
- Pohlia aloysii-sabaudiae G.Negri
- Pohlia ampullacea Hampe ex Gangulee
- Pohlia andalusica (Höhn.) Broth.
- Pohlia andrewsii A.J.Shaw
- Pohlia annotina (Hedw.) Lindb.
- Pohlia apolensis R.S.Williams
- Pohlia aristatula (Broth. & Paris) H.A.Mill., H.Whittier & B.Whittier
- Pohlia atropurpurea (Wahlenb.) H.Lindb.
- Pohlia atrothecia (Müll.Hal.) Broth.
- Pohlia australis A.J.Shaw & Fife
- Pohlia austroelongata (Müll.Hal.) Broth.
- Pohlia austropolymorpha (Müll.Hal.) Broth.
- Pohlia baldwinii (Broth. ex E.B.Bartram) W.Schultze-Motel
- Pohlia barbuloides Ochi
- Pohlia baronii Wijk & Margad.
- Pohlia bequaertii (Dixon & Naveau) A.J.Shaw
- Pohlia beringiensis A.J.Shaw
- Pohlia bolanderi (Lesq.) Broth.
- Pohlia brachystoma M.Fleisch. ex Broth.
- Pohlia brevinervis Lindb. & Arnell
- Pohlia brevireticulata Warnst.
- Pohlia brideliana (Müll.Hal.) Wijk & Margad.
- Pohlia bulbifera (Warnst.) Warnst.
- Pohlia calopyxis (Müll.Hal.) Broth.
- Pohlia camptotrachela (Renauld & Cardot) Broth.
- Pohlia cardotii (Renauld) Broth.
- Pohlia cavaleriei (Cardot & Thér.) Redf. & B.C.Tan
- Pohlia chilensis (Mont.) A.J.Shaw
- Pohlia chitralensis P.Størmer
- Pohlia chrysoblasta (Thér. & Naveau) Demaret
- Pohlia claviformis ^{(Hampe) Broth.}
- Pohlia columbica (Kindb.) A.L.Andrews
- Pohlia cratericola Broth.
- Pohlia cruda (Hedw.) Lindb.
- Pohlia crudoides (Sull. & Lesq.) Broth.
- Pohlia debatii (Cardot & Thér.) Broth.
- Pohlia drummondii (Müll.Hal.) A.L.Andrews
- Pohlia elongata Hedw.
- Pohlia emergens (Müll.Hal.) A.J.Shaw
- Pohlia erecta Lindb.
- Pohlia excelsa Kindb.
- Pohlia excurrens (Dixon) E.B.Bartram
- Pohlia fauriei (Cardot) Ihsiba
- Pohlia filum (Schimp.) Mårtensson
- Pohlia flexuosa Harv.
- Pohlia geniculata (Brid.) Wijk & Margad.
- Pohlia grammophylla (Besch.) Broth.
- Pohlia gromieri (Thér.) G.Kis
- Pohlia hisae T.J.Kop. & J.X.Luo
- Pohlia humilis (Mont.) Broth.
- Pohlia hyaloperistoma Da C.Zhang, X.J.Li & Higuchi
- Pohlia inflexa (Müll.Hal.) Wijk & Margad.
- Pohlia kenyae (Dixon) G.Kis
- Pohlia korbiana (Müll.Hal.) Wijk & Margad.
- Pohlia lacouturei (Thér.) O'Shea
- Pohlia lescuriana (Sull.) Grout
- Pohlia lonchochaete (Dusén) Broth.
- Pohlia longibracteata Broth.
- Pohlia longicolla (Hedw.) Lindb.
- Pohlia looseri (Thér.) S.He
- Pohlia ludwigii (Spreng. ex Schwägr.) Broth.
- Pohlia lutescens (Limpr.) H.Lindb.
- Pohlia macleai (Rehmann ex Sim) Schelpe
- Pohlia macrocarpa Da C.Zhang, X.J.Li & Higuchi
- Pohlia marchica Osterwald
- Pohlia mauiensis (Broth. ex E.B.Bartram) W.Schultze-Motel
- Pohlia melanodon (Brid.) A.J.Shaw
- Pohlia merapicola (Baumgartner & J.Froehl.) B.C.Ho, B.C.Tan & Hernawati
- Pohlia microcarpa Hornsch.
- Pohlia nemicaulon (Müll.Hal.) Broth.
- Pohlia nevadensis (Müll.Hal.) Broth.
- Pohlia nutans (Hedw.) Lindb.
- Pohlia nutantipolymorpha (Müll.Hal.) Broth.
- Pohlia obtusifolia (Vill. ex Brid.) L.F.Koch
- Pohlia ochii Vitt
- Pohlia oedoneura (Müll.Hal.) Broth.
- Pohlia oerstediana (Müll.Hal.) A.J.Shaw
- Pohlia orthocarpula (Müll.Hal.) Broth.
- Pohlia otaruensis (Cardot) Ihsiba
- Pohlia pacifica A.J.Shaw
- Pohlia papillosa (Spruce) Broth.
- Pohlia pentasticha (Schiffn.) Schiffn. ex Podp.
- Pohlia philonotula (Müll.Hal.) Broth.
- Pohlia plumella (Müll.Hal.) Broth.
- Pohlia procerrima M.Fleisch.
- Pohlia proligera (Kindb. ex Breidl.) Lindb. ex Arnell
- Pohlia pseudobarbula (Thér.) H.A.Crum ex A.J.Shaw
- Pohlia pseudodefecta Ochi
- Pohlia pseudophilonotula (Müll.Hal.) Broth.
- Pohlia rabunbaldensis A.J.Shaw
- Pohlia ramannii Warnst.
- Pohlia rhaetica (Rota) Broth.
- Pohlia rigescens (Mitt.) Broth.
- Pohlia robertsonii Shevock & A.J.Shaw
- Pohlia rostrata (A.Jaeger) Broth.
- Pohlia saitoi Ochi
- Pohlia saprophila (Müll.Hal.) Broth.
- Pohlia schisticola (Müll.Hal.) Broth.
- Pohlia scotica Crundw.
- Pohlia silvatica Warnst.
- Pohlia sphagnicola (Bruch & Schimp.) Broth.
- Pohlia stewartii E.B.Bartram
- Pohlia subannulata (H.Philib.) Broth.
- Pohlia subcarnea (Schimp. ex Besch.) Ihsiba
- Pohlia subcompactula (Paris) Wijk & Margad.
- Pohlia tapintzensis (Besch.) Redf. & B.C.Tan
- Pohlia tibetana Xiao R.Wang & X.M.Shao
- Pohlia timmioides (Broth.) P.C.Chen ex Redf. & B.C.Tan
- Pohlia tundrae A.J.Shaw
- Pohlia vexans (Limpr.) H.Lindb.
- Pohlia wahlenbergii (F.Weber & D.Mohr) A.L.Andrews
- Pohlia wilsonii (Mitt.) Ochyra
- Pohlia yunnanensis (Besch.) Broth.
