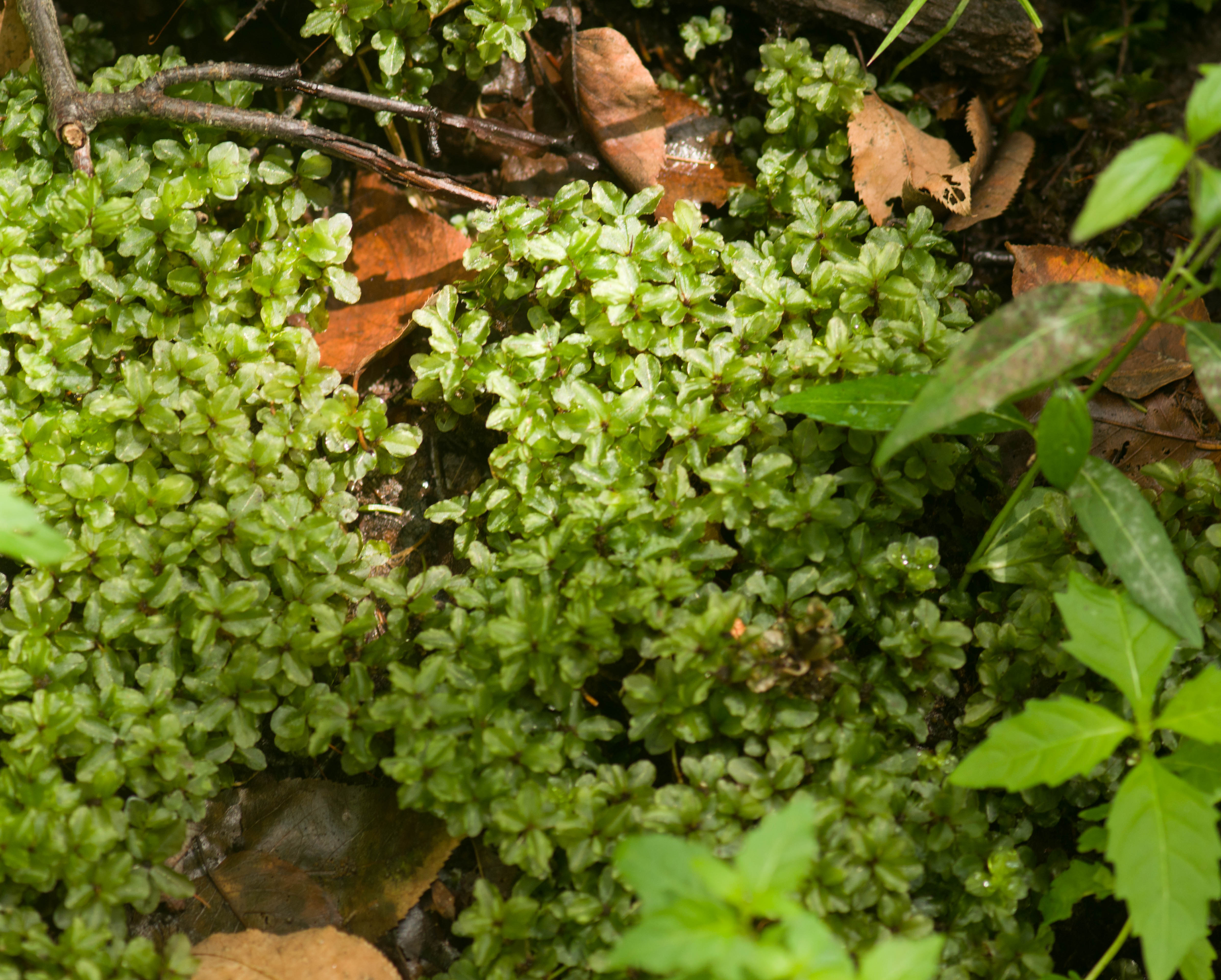
- Rhizomnium appalachianum growing from a seep in Dolly Sods Wilderness WV

Scientific classification
- Kingdom: Plantae
- Division: Bryophyta
- Class: Bryopsida
- Subclass: Bryidae
- Order: Bryales
- Family: Mniaceae
- Genus: Rhizomnium
- Species: R. appalachianum

Binomial name
- Rhizomnium appalachianum T. J. Koponen

Synonyms
- Mnium punctatum var. appalachianum (T. J. Koponen) H. A. Crum & L. E. Anderson; Mnium punctatum Hedw. var. elatum auct. non Shimp.

= Rhizomnium appalachianum =

Species of moss

Rhizomnium appalachianum is a species of moss in the family Mniaceae native to the Eastern United States and Canada, from Manitoba to Newfoundland and south to South Carolina. It grows 4-8cm tall, and has relatively large leaves for a moss which are typically 6.5mm wide and 10mm long. The stems are covered in reddish hairs. It grows in wet areas such as along streams and in seeps and especially the edges where there is a transition from wet to dry.
