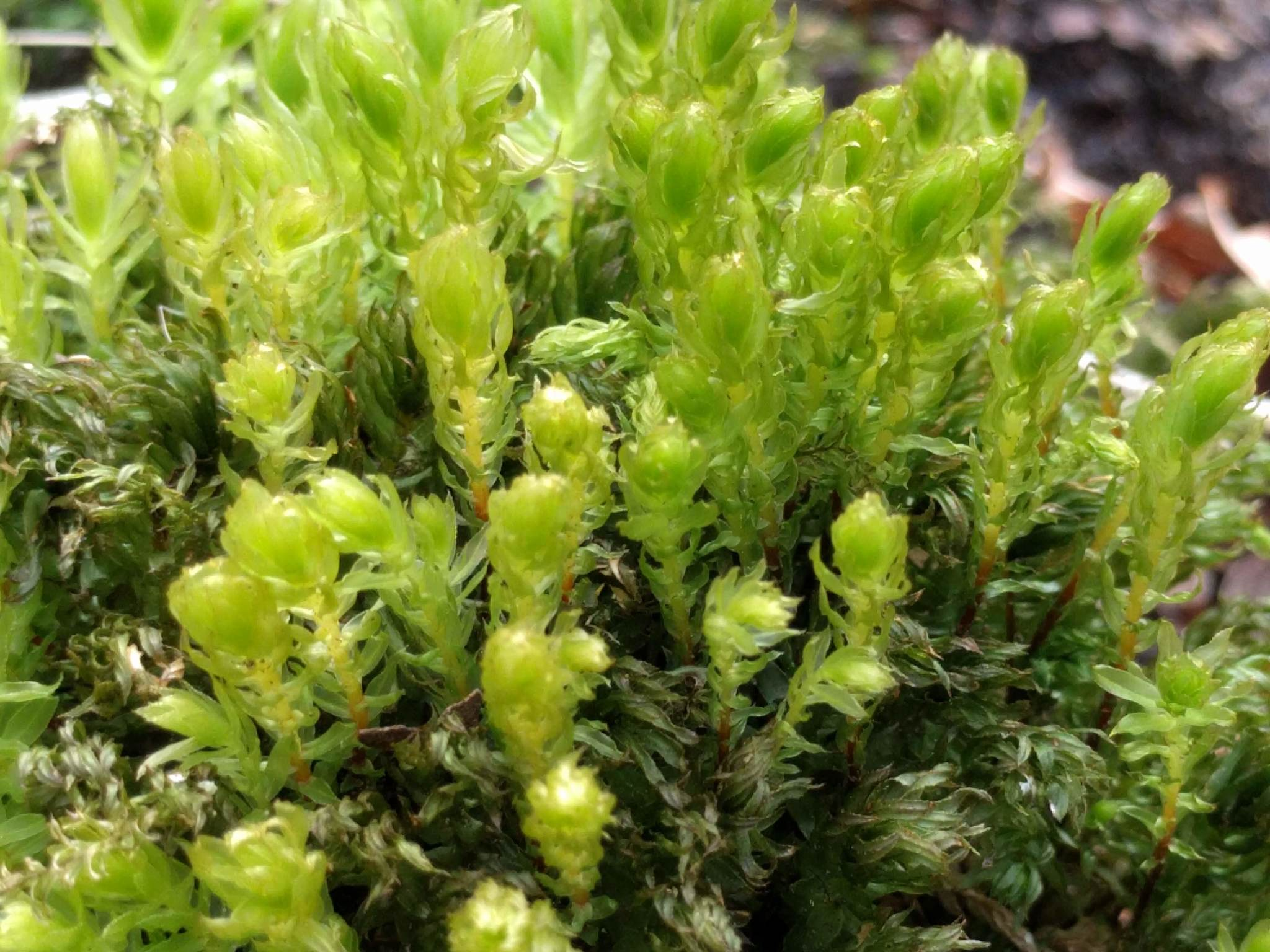
- Mnium hornum

Scientific classification
- Kingdom: Plantae
- Division: Bryophyta
- Class: Bryopsida
- Subclass: Bryidae
- Order: Bryales
- Family: Mniaceae
- Genus: Mnium; Hedw.

= Mnium =

Genus of mosses

Mnium is a genus of mosses belonging to the family Mniaceae. The species of this genus are found in Europe and North America.

== Species ==
The following species are recognised in the genus Mnium:

- Mnium arizonicum J.J. Amann – Arizona calcareous moss
- Mnium blyttii Bruch & Schimp. – Blytt's calcareous moss
- Mnium hornum Hedw. – horn calcareous moss
- Mnium jungermannia L.
- Mnium lycopodioides Schwägr.
- Mnium marginatum (Dicks. ex With.) P. Beauv. – olivegreen calcareous moss
- Mnium spinosum (Voit) Schwägr. – spinosum calcareous moss
- Mnium spinulosum Bruch & Schimp. – largetooth calcareous moss
- Mnium stellare Hedw. – stellar calcareous moss
- Mnium thomsonii Schimp. – Thomson's calcareous moss
