= Decoy Carr, Acle =

Protected area in Norfolk, England

Coordinates: 52.625°N 1.552°E

- Site of Special Scientific Interest
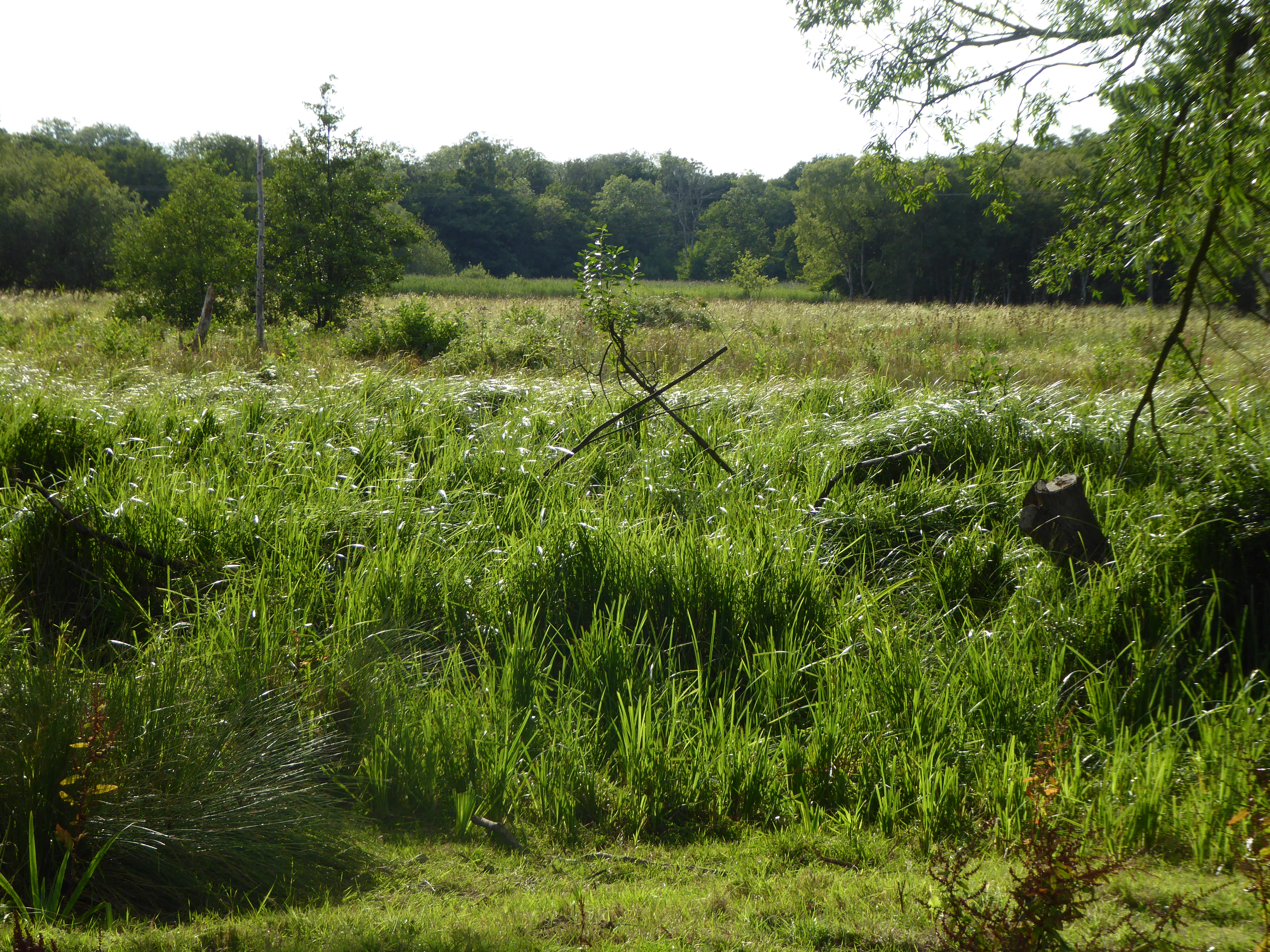
- Location of Decoy Carr, Acle.
- Area of search: Norfolk
- Grid reference: TG 405 090
- Interest: Biological
- Area: 56.0 hectares (138 acres)
- Notification date: 1985
- Location map: Magic Map

Decoy Carr, Acle is a 56-hectare (140-acre) biological Site of Special Scientific Interest south of Acle in Norfolk, England. It is part of the Broadland Ramsar site and Special Protection Area, and The Broads Special Area of Conservation.

This area of wet carr woodland, fen, reedbeds and open water, is spring fed. It has a number of rare Arctic–alpine mosses, such as Cinclidium stygium and Camptothecium nitens, which indicate only minor disturbance since the end of the last ice age. There is a network of dykes which have clear spring water and a variety of water plants.

The site is private land with no public access.
