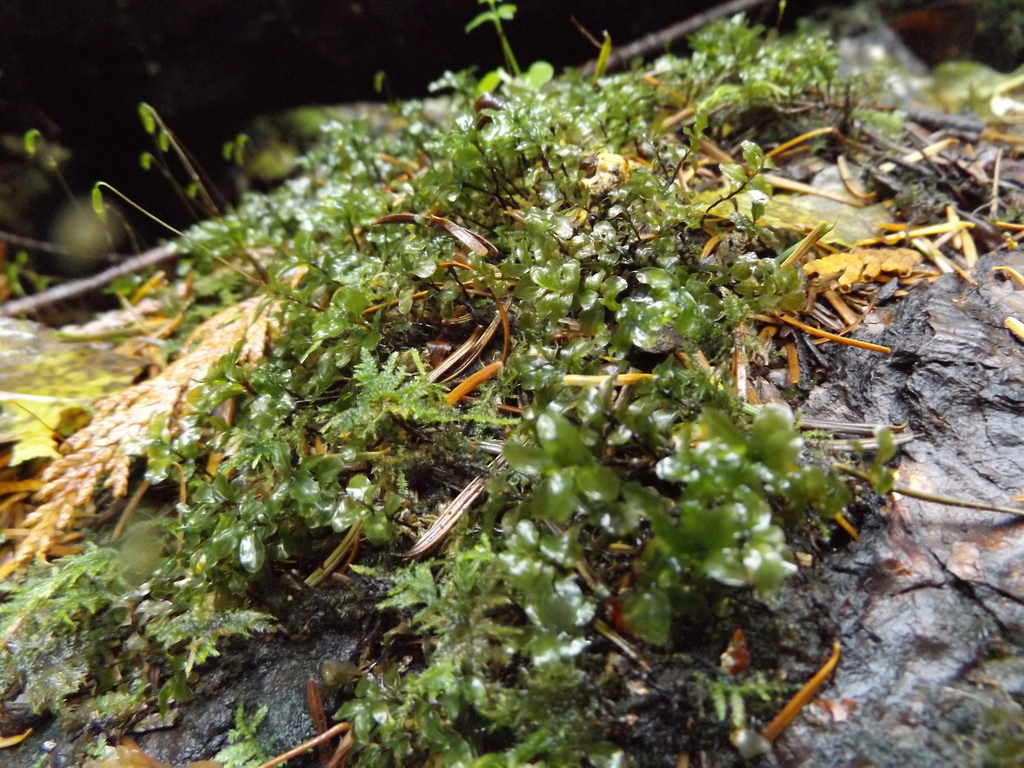

Scientific classification
- Kingdom: Plantae
- Division: Bryophyta
- Class: Bryopsida
- Subclass: Bryidae
- Order: Bryales
- Family: Mniaceae
- Genus: Rhizomnium
- Species: R. glabrescens

Binomial name
- Rhizomnium glabrescens (Kindb.) T.J.Kop.

= Rhizomnium glabrescens =

Species of moss

Rhizomnium glabrescens, also called fan moss or large leafy moss, is a species of moss in the genus Rhizomnium.

== Description ==
These plants are upright, unbranched and unisexual. Their stems are naked, up to 3 cm high, are shiny and have large leaves. Male plants have large, rose-like clusters of leaves at the tip while female plants have capsules. It is very common on rotting logs, humus and soil over rocks in low- and middle-elevation forests. It is the most common species of leafy moss in low-elevation forests.
