= Trachycystis =

Trachycystis is the scientific name of two genera of organisms and may refer to:

- Trachycystis (gastropod), a genus of snails in the family Charopidae
- Trachycystis (plant), a genus of mosses in the family Mniaceae
