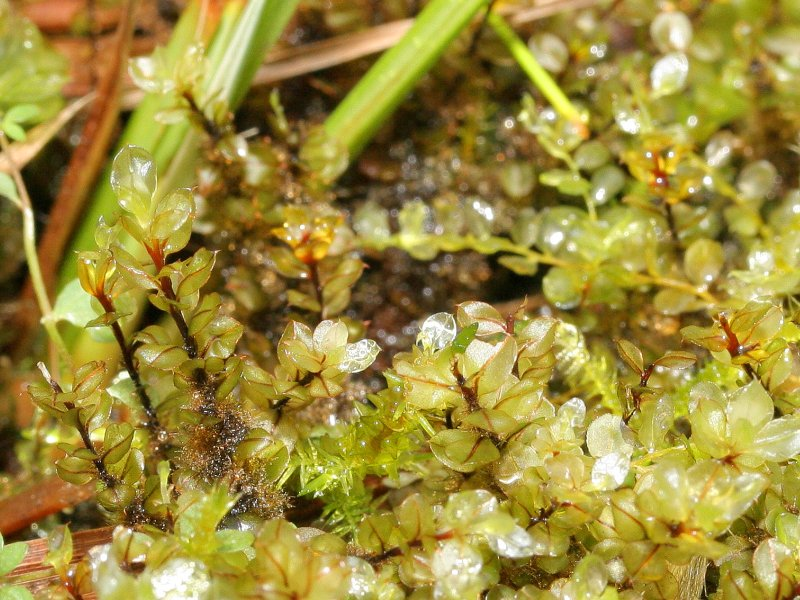

Scientific classification
- Kingdom: Plantae
- Division: Bryophyta
- Class: Bryopsida
- Subclass: Bryidae
- Order: Bryales
- Family: Mniaceae
- Genus: Cinclidium
- Species: C. stygium

Binomial name
- Cinclidium stygium Swartz, 1803

= Cinclidium stygium =

Species of moss

Cinclidium stygium is a species of moss belonging to the family Mniaceae.

It is native to Eurasia and America.
