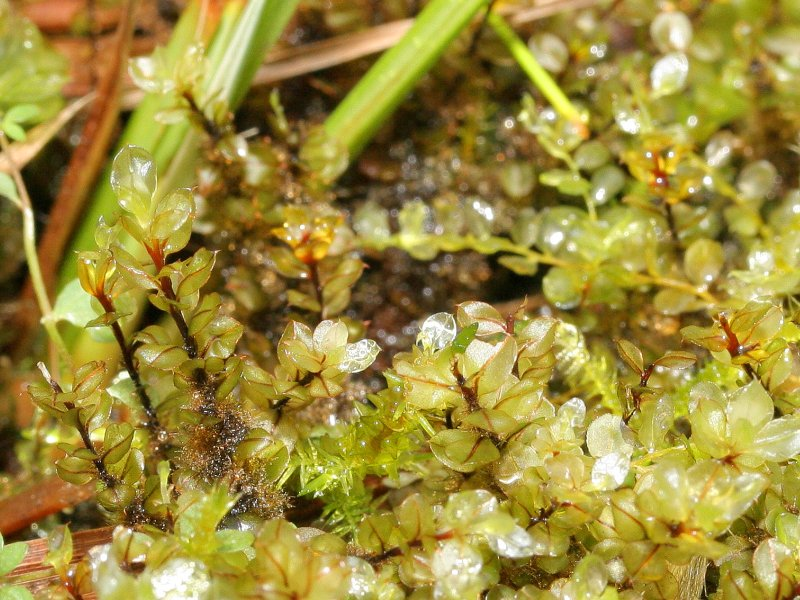
- Cinclidium stygium

Scientific classification
- Kingdom: Plantae
- Division: Bryophyta
- Class: Bryopsida
- Subclass: Bryidae
- Order: Bryales
- Family: Mniaceae
- Genus: Cinclidium; Sw.

= Cinclidium (plant) =

Genus of mosses

Cinclidium is a genus of mosses belonging to the family Mniaceae. The genus was first described by Olof Swartz. The species of this genus are found in Eurasia and America.

Species:

- Cinclidium alaskanum R.E.Wyatt & A.H.Stoneb.
- Cinclidium arcticum (Bruch & Schimp.) Schimp.
- Cinclidium latifolium Lindb.
- Cinclidium minutifolium Broth.
- Cinclidium stygium Sw.
- Cinclidium subrotundum Lindb
