= Rhizopogon salebrosus =

Scientific classification
- Kingdom: Fungi
- Division: Basidiomycota
- Class: Agaricomycetes
- Order: Boletales
- Family: Rhizopogonaceae
- Genus: Rhizopogon
- Subgenus: Rhizopogon subg. Amylopogon
- Species: R. salebrosus

Binomial name
- Rhizopogon salebrosus A.H.Sm.

Species of fungus

Rhizopogon salebrosus is a mushroom species within the Rhizopogon subgenus Amylopogon. R. salebrosus is a monotropoid mycorrhiza that is of vital importance to the ecology of conifer forests, especially in the Pacific Northwest region of North America. Although it is native to North America, R. salebrosus has been found in Europe and its range is generally limited to mountainous regions with sufficient precipitation. The mycoheterotrophic plant, Pterospora andromedea is often found in an obligate association with R. salebrosus in western parts of the U.S. Eastern populations of P. andromedea are typically symbiotic with another Rhizopogon sub species, R. kretzerae.

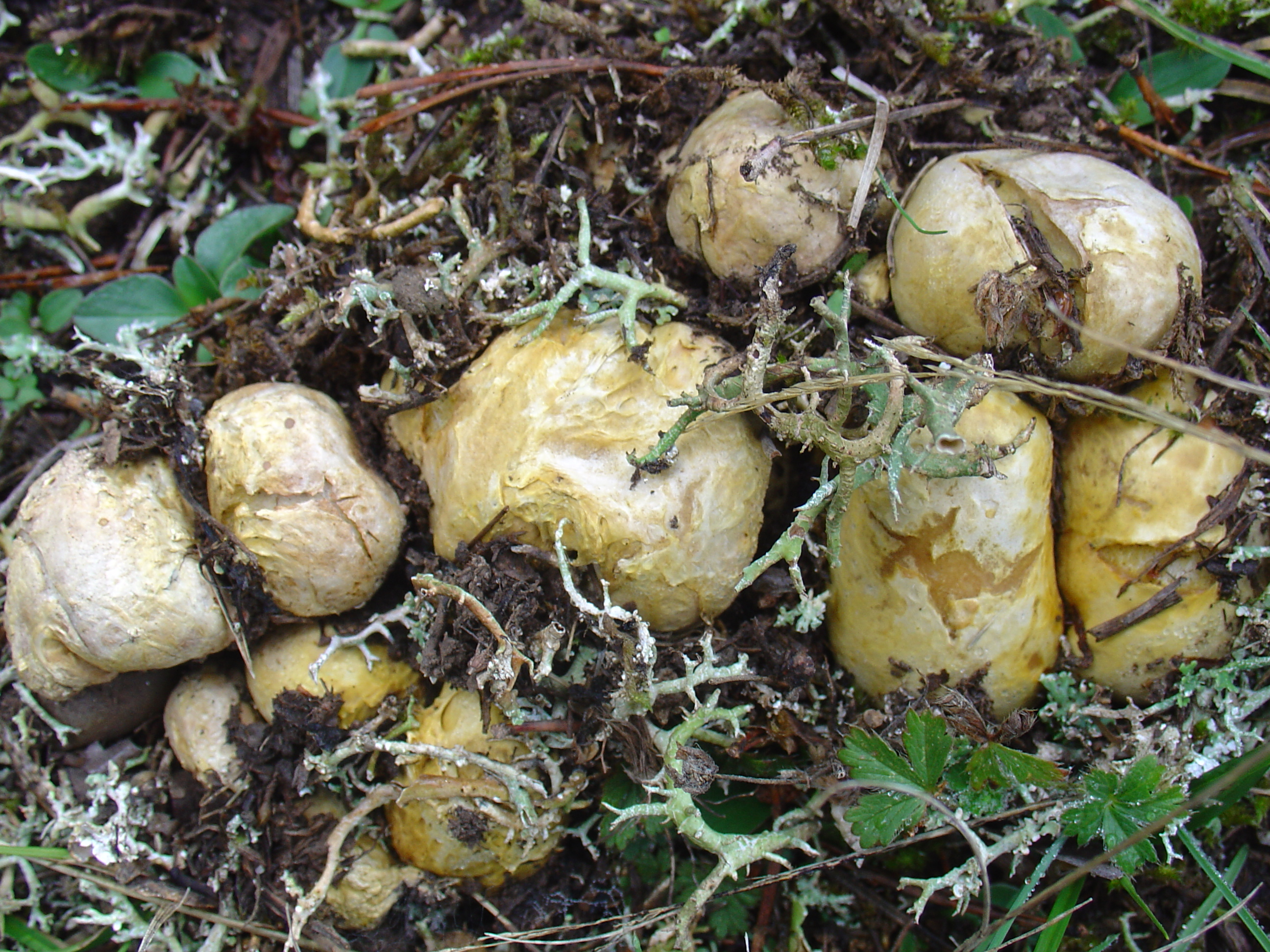
Rhizopogon sp. from Sierra de Valdemeca, Cuenca, Spain

Species that form these mycoheterotrophic relationships like P. andromedea and R. salebrosus benefit one other by sharing essential nutrients. For example, ectomycorrhizal plants contribute up to 30% of their fixed carbon in exchange for nitrogen that their host fungi absorb from the soil. These unique mycoheterotrophic associations are thought to have evolved due to low light availability on the forest floor.

== Ecology ==
Competition among ectomycorrhizal species plays an influential role in the composition and distribution of Rhizopogon species and the plants they associate with. Abiotic factors such as soil chemistry and soil moisture affect ectomycorrhizal assemblages, however much less is known about the biotic factors that determine their composition other than host specificity. One study compared the competitive advantage between Rhizopogon salebrosus and Rhizopogon occidentalis. Each Rhizopogon species was introduced to Pinus muricata seedlings and the root tip biomass of each species was determined every few months. This was possible because a number of seedlings were planted in microcosms with only R. salebrosus, only R. occidentalis, or both R. salebrosus and R. occidentalis and grown under the same conditions. Some seedlings were then harvested every 2 months, the soil was rinsed from the root mass, and then the percentage of fungal occupation of their roots was determined using molecular sequencing. They found that R. occidentalis had similar root tip biomass when grown alone or in the presence of R. salebrosus. However, R. salebrosus had significantly less root tip biomass when grown in the presence of R. occidentalis than when grown alone, indicating it as a competitive inferior. Another study involving the same two Rhizopogon species examined the beneficial effects they imparted to their host plant. They found no significant difference in growth, survival, or percentage leaf nitrogen of seedlings colonized with either R. salebrosus or R. occidentalis. However, plants inoculated with both ectomycorrhizal species showed significantly higher growth and percent leaf nitrogen compared to seedlings without ectomycorrhizal fungus. Another interesting aspect of ectomycorrhizal competition are the strategies used to persist over long periods and colonize during unfavorable conditions such as drought or wildfire. Fungi are able to disperse and propagate with the help of spores and sclerotia which are able to remain dormant in the soil for some time, although their longevity is not well understood. In one a study the viability of fungal propagules was tested by collecting soil samples from the forest and aging them for six years. While the colonization rate was low, R. salebrosus was identified as a species able to survive in the soil for at least six years.

== Distribution ==
Distribution of species is a prevalent topic, especially as climate change continues to alter forest ecosystems. Within the Deschutes National Forest, Oregon, USA, the historic range of Pinus contorta is steadily changing due to increasing temperatures and drought, declines in winter precipitation and snowpack. These environmental changes may have facilitated the migration of Pinus ponderosa into P. contorta territory. Observations such as these have led to studies examining the relationship between pine species distribution and how they are aided through the fungal composition of the soil. It has been confirmed that R. salebrosus is one of the dominant fungal symbionts in both P. contorta and P. ponderosa. These findings indicate that the successful migration of pine species may be influenced by the previous distribution or co-migration of ectomycorrhizal fungi.

Fire is known to significantly reduce biomass and diversity of ectomycorrhizal fungi. Though some species are more persistent than others. One study found that R. salebrosus was present in the soil before and after prescribed burning, suggesting that it is able to survive or re-establish quickly after a disturbance such as fire.

== Similar species ==
Rhizopogon kretzerae is another ectomycorrhizal fungus under the Rhizopogon subgenus Amylopogon. R. kretzerae are similar to R. salebrosus in that they form obligate symbiotic relationships with Pterospora andromedea, however these associations are usually only observed in eastern populations. Like other members of the subgenus Amylopogon, R. kretzerae is known to act as a mycobiont host to the parasitic plant P. andromedea and grow under members of Pinaceae, however it has only ever been found associated with Pinus strobus or the eastern white pine. In recent years there has been a noticeable decline in eastern populations of P. andromedea likely due to human impact. Conservation management efforts are being made by examining the genetics of P. andromedea's preferred eastern fungal symbiont, R. kretzerae. In many cases, mycoheterotrophic plants and mycorrhizal fungal relationships are so specific that seedling recruitment is not possible in the absence of their key fungal symbiont. Close relatives of the host fungi are sometimes able to trigger germination, though survivorship is low.
