= Johann Ehrenfried Pohl =

German physician and botanist (1746–1800)

Johann Ehrenfried Pohl (12 September 1746, Leipzig – 25 October 1800, Dresden) was a German physician and botanist. He was the son of physician Johann Christoph Pohl (1706–1780).

From 1763 to 1769, he studied medicine at the University of Leipzig, receiving his doctorate in 1772. Afterwards, he embarked on an extended study trip to Strasbourg, Paris, Rouen and the Netherlands. In 1773, he became an associate professor of botany at Leipzig, where he later served as a professor of pathology (1789–96) and therapy (1796–1800).

In 1774, he became a member of the Römisch-Kaiserlichen Akademie der Naturforscher, and, in 1788, was named a personal physician to royalty in Dresden. The moss genus Pohlia was named in his honor by Johann Hedwig.

== Published works ==
- Animadversiones in structuram ac figuram foliorum in plantis, 1771.
- De sensibus morborum causism, 1772 (with Anton Wilhelm Plaz, respondent Johann Ehrenfried Pohl).
- De soli differentia in cultura plantarum attendenda, 1773.
- De varice interno morborum quorundam caussa, 1785.
- De medico exorcistam, 1788 (respondent Johann Gottfried Jancke).
- Programma qua de analogia inter morbillos et tussim convulsivam, 1789.
