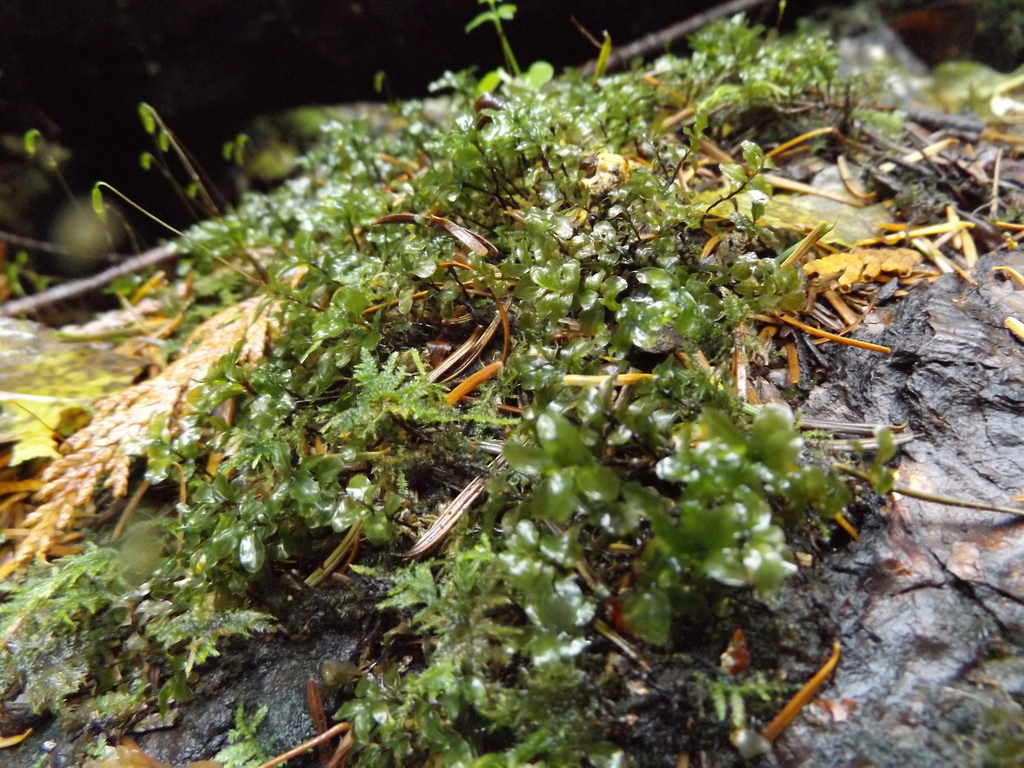
- Rhizomnium glabrescens

Scientific classification
- Kingdom: Plantae
- Division: Bryophyta
- Class: Bryopsida
- Subclass: Bryidae
- Order: Bryales
- Family: Mniaceae
- Genus: Rhizomnium; T. J. Koponen

= Rhizomnium =

Genus of mosses

Rhizomnium is a genus of mosses in the family Mniaceae commonly referred to as leafy mosses. They grow nearly worldwide, mostly in the northern hemisphere.

== Species ==
- Rhizomnium andrewsianum
- Rhizomnium appalachianum
- Rhizomnium glabrescens
- Rhizomnium gracile
- Rhizomnium horikawae
- Rhizomnium magnifolium
- Rhizomnium nudum
- Rhizomnium pseudopunctatum
- Rhizomnium punctatum
- Rhizomnium striatulum

Fossil species:

- Rhizomnium dentatum
