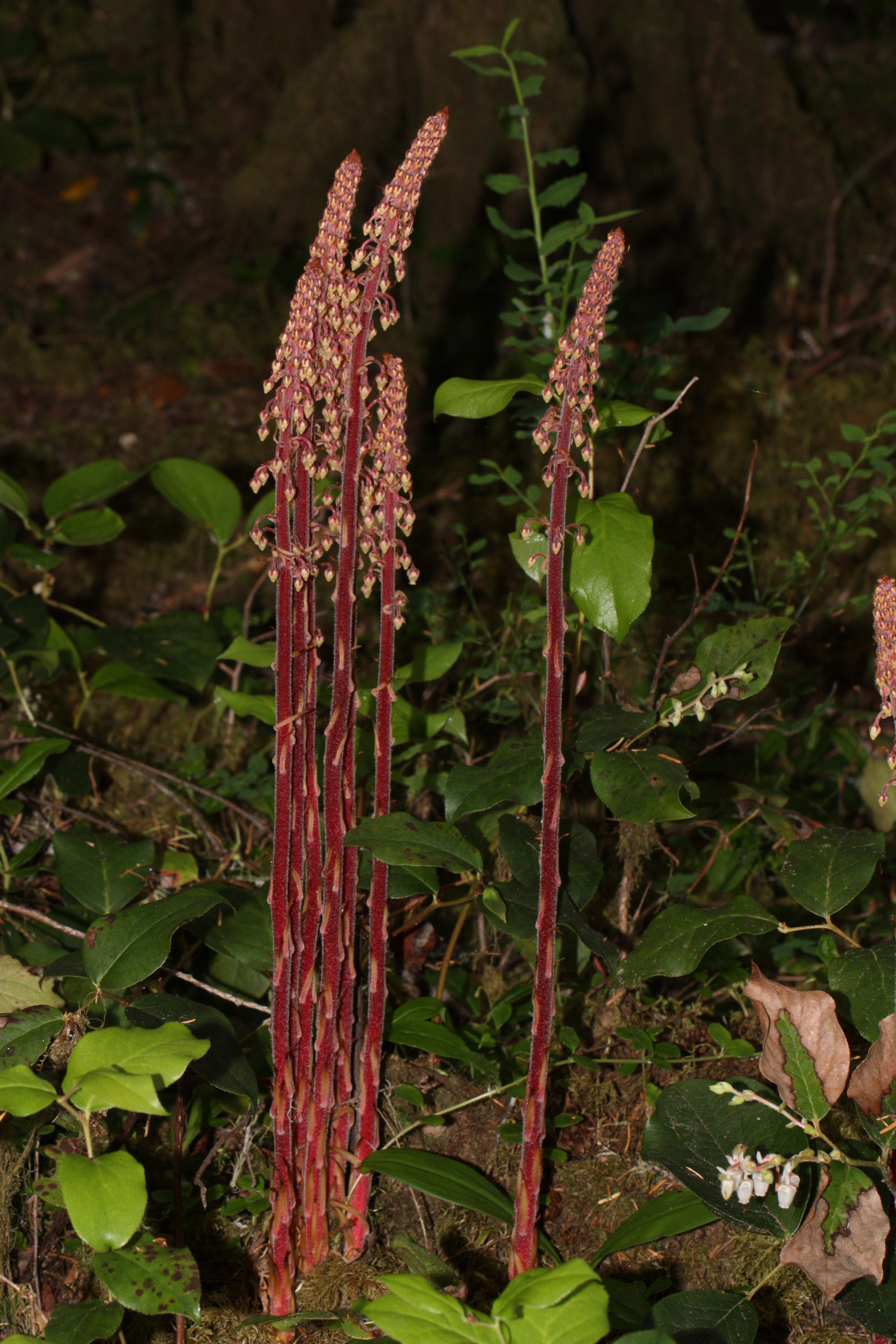

Conservation status
- Secure (NatureServe)

Scientific classification
- Kingdom: Plantae
- Clade: Embryophytes
- Clade: Tracheophytes
- Clade: Spermatophytes
- Clade: Angiosperms
- Clade: Eudicots
- Clade: Asterids
- Order: Ericales
- Family: Ericaceae
- Subfamily: Monotropoideae
- Tribe: Pterosporeae
- Genus: Pterospora; Nutt. 1818
- Species: P. andromedea

Binomial name
- Pterospora andromedea Nutt. 1818

= Pterospora =

Genus of plants

Pterospora, commonly known as pinedrops, woodland pinedrops, Albany beechdrops, or giant bird's nest, is a North American genus in the subfamily Monotropoideae of the heath family, and includes only the species Pterospora andromedea. It grows as a mycoheterotroph (relying on fungi rather than photosynthesis for nutrients) in coniferous or mixed forests. It is widespread across much of Canada as well as the western and northeastern United States to Mexico. Along with Monotropa it is one of the more frequently encountered genera of the Monotropoideae.

== Description ==
The visible portion of Pterospora andromedea is a fleshy, unbranched, reddish to yellowish flower spike (raceme) 15–170 cm (6–67 in) in height, though it has been reported to occasionally attain a height of 2 meters (6.6 feet). The above-ground stalks (inflorescences) resemble an emerging asparagus spear in shape and are usually found in small clusters between June and August. The inflorescences are hairy and noticeably sticky to the touch. This is caused by the presence of hairs which exude a sticky substance (glandular hairs). The inflorescences are covered by leaves that have been reduced to scale-like structures known as bracts that are 2–3.5 centimeters long and 0.5–1 centimeter wide. The lower portion of the flowering stem is tightly covered in bracts and they become more widely spaced higher on the stalk.

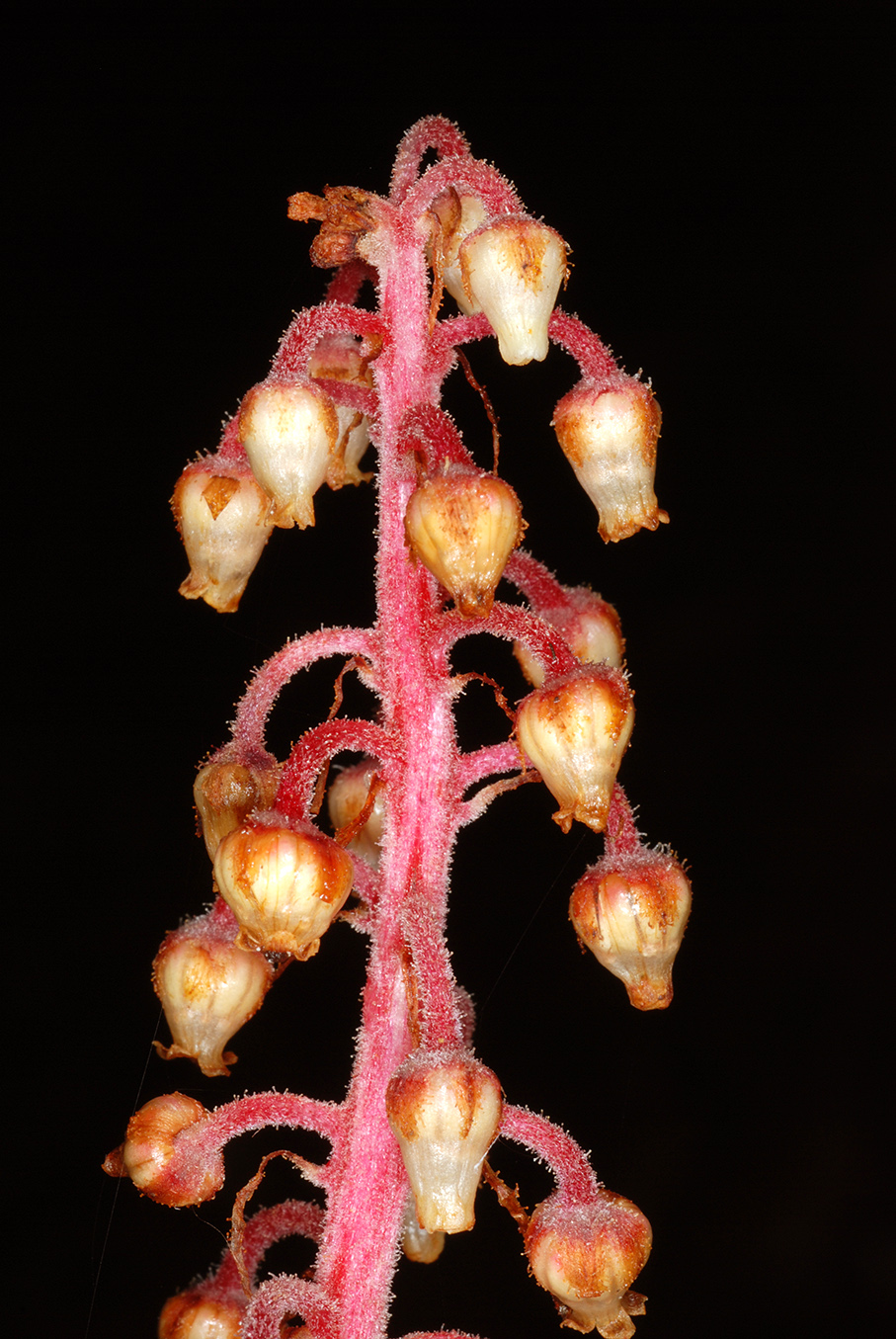
Pterospora flowers

The upper portion of the inflorescence has a series of white, yellowish, or rusty urn-shaped flowers that face downward. Each flower may have five sepals surrounding the base of the flower, which measure 4–6 millimeters long and are 2—3 millimeters wide. The fused petals (the corolla) measure 6–9 millimeters in length.

The fruit is a capsule with five lobes that are 7–10 millimeters wide. Inside the capsules there are large numbers of very small seeds with, thin papery wings that are much wider than the seeds themselves. Plants exist for most of their life as a mass of branching roots that form round root balls. These root balls may be penetrated by the roots of other plants, but there are no vascular connections between them. At most, the total volume of a root ball is no more than 150–200 cubic centimeters. The inflorescence will grow from buds on roots which grow horizontally.

Once fruiting is complete the flowering stems dry out and persist in the forest for a significant length of time.

The main plants that may be confused with Pterospora andromedea are the mycoheterotrophic orchids in genus Corallorhiza, commonly called the coral roots. However, their flowers are bilaterally symmetrical, not regular like those of pinedrops.

== Fungal interactions ==
P. andromedea, like all members of Monotropoideae, is a mycoheterotroph. This is a form of carbon acquisition that is parasitic on fungal organisms and epiparastic of photosynthetic plants which are symbionts to the fungal host. Because P. andromedea is achlorophyllous this relationship is an obligate symbiosis for it, but is not ubiquitous in the fungal host. All monotropoideae are host specific to a select few fungal counterparts which in turn makes them specific to the photosynthetic organism associated with their fungal host. In the case of P. andromedea fungal host specificity leans heavily towards Rhizopogon salebrosus in the western distribution and Rhizopogon kretzerae in the eastern distribution but broadly seems to be ubiquitous symbionts with Rhizopogon subgenus Amylopogon. Rhizopogon species also exhibit high host specificity and sub-genus Amylopogon is primarily associated with the Pinus genus. Fungal exoenzymatic activity has been shown to be required for seed germination of P. andromedea however the requisite enzymes are not exclusively produced within subgenus Amylopogon indicating that seed colonization by fungi outside of the observed host specificity is possible however ecologically restricted by some currently unknown mechanism. Though often described as a parasitic relationship, there is some evidence that it may be a mutualistic partnership.

== Taxonomy ==
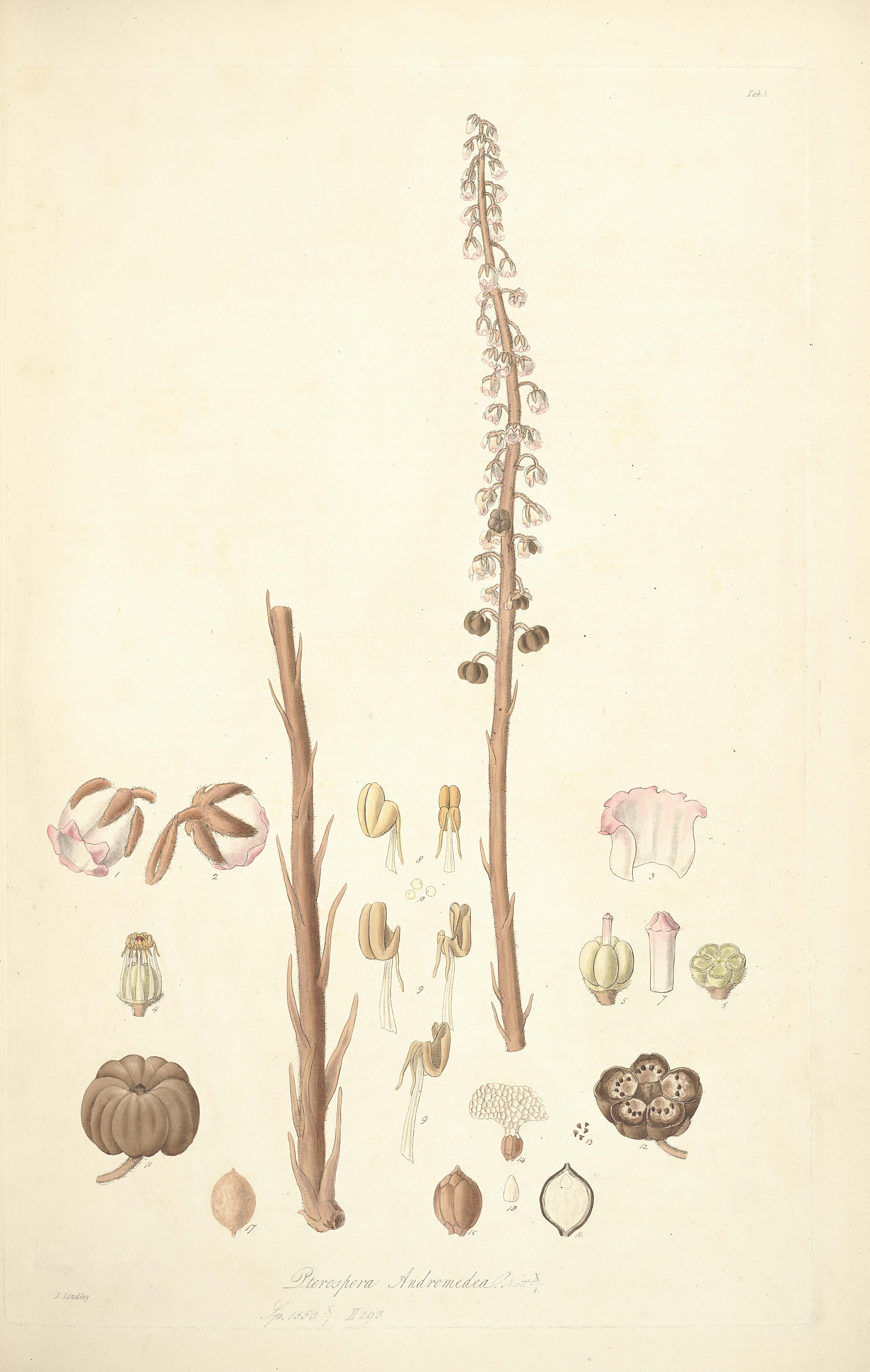
Illustration from John Lindley's Collectanea botanica

Pterospora andromedea was first scientifically described by Thomas Nuttall in 1818. He based his work on specimens collected by Charles Whitlow in Canada near Niagara Falls. Amos Eaton published a description of the plant as Monotropa procera at almost the same time, but available evidence shows that Nuttall's publication was before Eaton's. As of 2024 Pterospora andromedea is the only species in the genus, making it a monotypic taxon.

Pterospora has consistently been shown to be more closely related to Sarcodes than any other member of the Monotropoideae.

=== Names ===
The genus name is derived from the morphology of the seeds which have narrow flaps of tissue on the side and therefore appear winged: pteron (Gr.) = wing, spora (Gr.) = seed. The specific name andromedea derives from the resemblance of the flowers to those of another genus in the Ericaceae, Andromeda.

In English it is known by the common name "pinedrops" and the similar "woodland pinedrops" and "giant pinedrops". Because Edwin James found the plant near Albany, New York it is also known as "Albany beechdrops". Another name is "giant bird's-nest".

In the Salish–Spokane–Kalispel language this species is called "senchelep tapemis" which can be translated as "coyote's arrow". In the Jemez language its name translates as "Elk Girl tree".

== Range and habitat ==
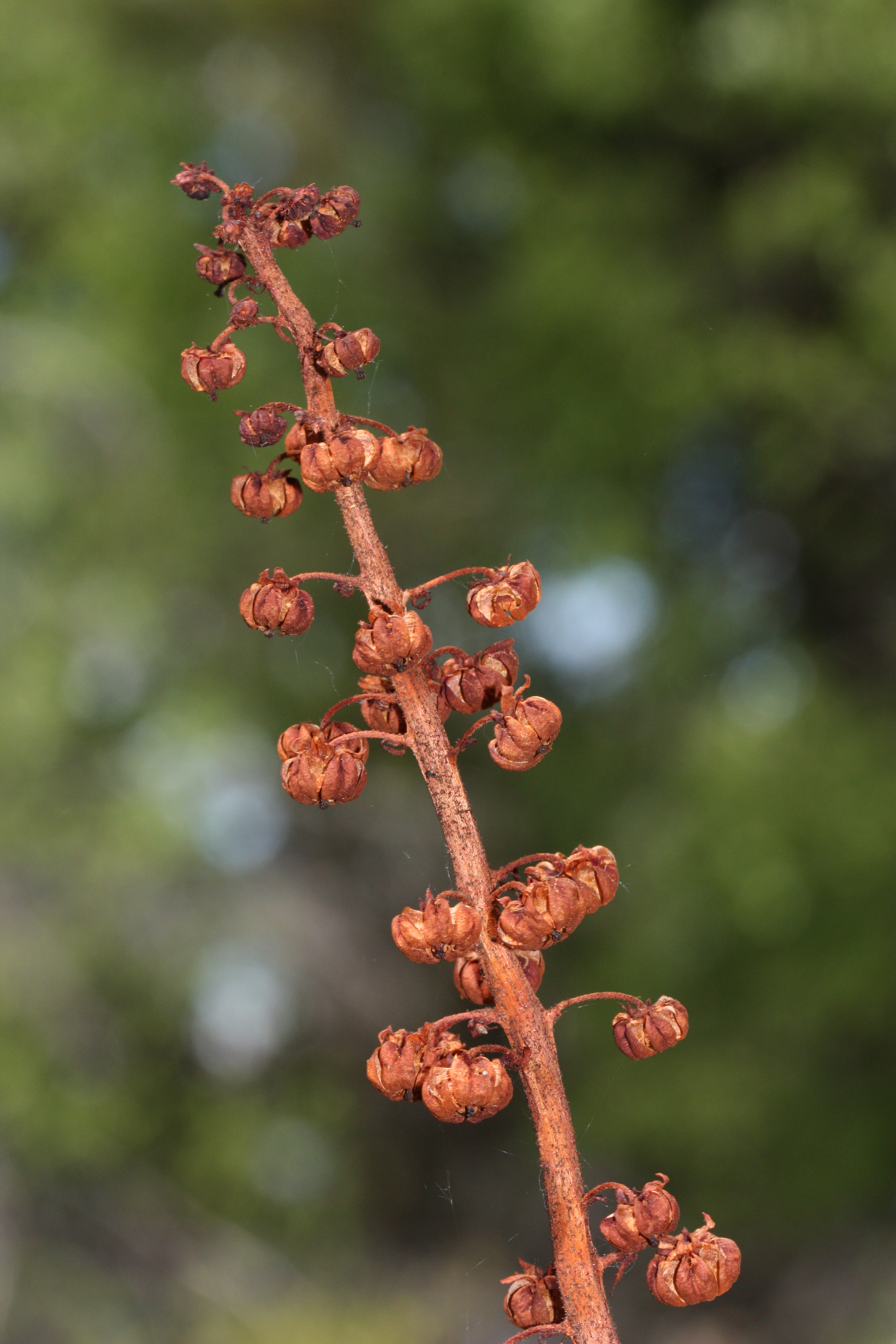
The fruits are five-celled woody capsules (Wenatchee Mountains, Washington).

Pterospora andromedea is native to North America from Alaska to central Mexico. It has two populations, the larger in western North America and the other in the east, separated by the Great Plains. In Canada it is found in the western provinces of British Columbia, Alberta, and Saskatchewan and in the eastern provinces of New Brunswick, Ontario, Prince Edward Island, and Québec. In the western United States it is found widely in Arizona, California, Colorado, Idaho, Montana, Nevada, New Mexico, Oregon, South Dakota, Utah, Washington state, and Wyoming. It has also been reported in Sioux County, Nebraska and without county level distributions in Texas. America's eastern population is found in Michigan, New Hampshire, New York, Vermont, Wisconsin, and possibly in Pennsylvania. It grows or has grown in many Mexican states including Chihuahua, Coahuila, Durango, Hidalgo, Mexico City, Mexico State, Morelos, Nuevo Leon, Oaxaca, Puebla, Sonora, Tlaxcala, and Veracruz. It is also very rarely found in the highest elevations of Sierra de San Pedro Mártir in Baja California.

In the western United States it is mainly found under conifer trees in areas with deep accumulations of needles and dry to moderately moist soils, but may also be found under some oak trees. More specifically they are found in Rocky Mountain Douglas-fir forests, ponderosa pine forests, the Sierra Nevada upper montane forest, and under eastern white pines and balsam firs around the Great Lakes (especially on dunes that have become forested).

== Ecology ==
In addition to not photosynthesizing, pinedrops are also a protocarnivorous plant. The sticky stems trap small insects and enzymes break them down for nitrogen.

Though not a typical hummingbird plant, the broad-tailed hummingbird (Selasphorus platycercus) has been seen drinking nectar from pinedrop flowers.

=== Conservation ===
In 2019 NatureServe evaluated the conservation status species and as "globally secure" (G5), a species that is not significantly declining over the whole of its range. At the state and provincial level it also found it to be "secure" S5 in British Columbia and "apparently secure" (S4) in Montana. However, it is "vulnerable" (S3) in Wyoming, Nevada, and Alberta. In the rest of the west they evaluated it as "imperiled" (S2) in Nebraska and "critically imperiled" (S1) in Texas and Saskatchewan. In the eastern part of its range it imperiled or critically imperiled in every state and province with the exceptions of Massachusetts, where the species was not evaluated, and Prince Edward Island, where it is possibly extirpated. It is imperiled in Michigan, Ontario, Quebec and critically imperiled in New Brunswick, New Hampshire, New York, Vermont, and Wisconsin.

== Uses ==
The seed stalks are occasionally collected to be used as long lasting ornaments in dry floral arrangements. Though the flowers are considered desirable by plant collectors, the very specific requirements of its fungal host make this plant practically impossible to transplant.

== See also ==
- Corallorhiza
