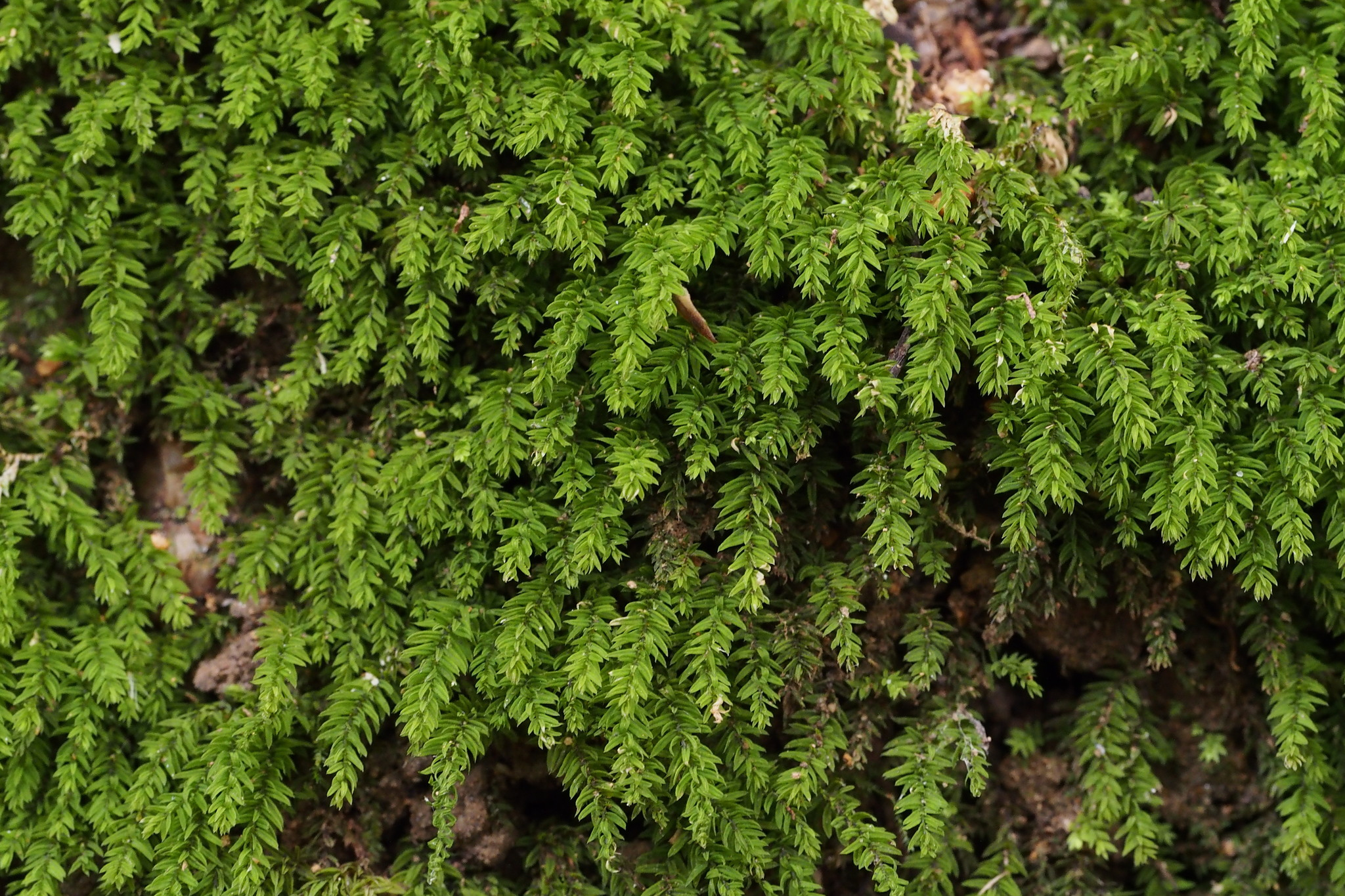
- Trachycystis microphylla

Scientific classification
- Kingdom: Plantae
- Division: Bryophyta
- Class: Bryopsida
- Subclass: Bryidae
- Order: Bryales
- Family: Mniaceae
- Genus: Trachycystis; Lindb., 1868

= Trachycystis (plant) =

Genus of mosses

Trachycystis is a genus of mosses in the family Mniaceae.

== Species ==
- Trachycystis antiquorum
- Trachycystis flagellaris
- Trachycystis microphylla
- Trachycystis obtusus
- Trachycystis szaferi
- Trachycystis ussuriensis
