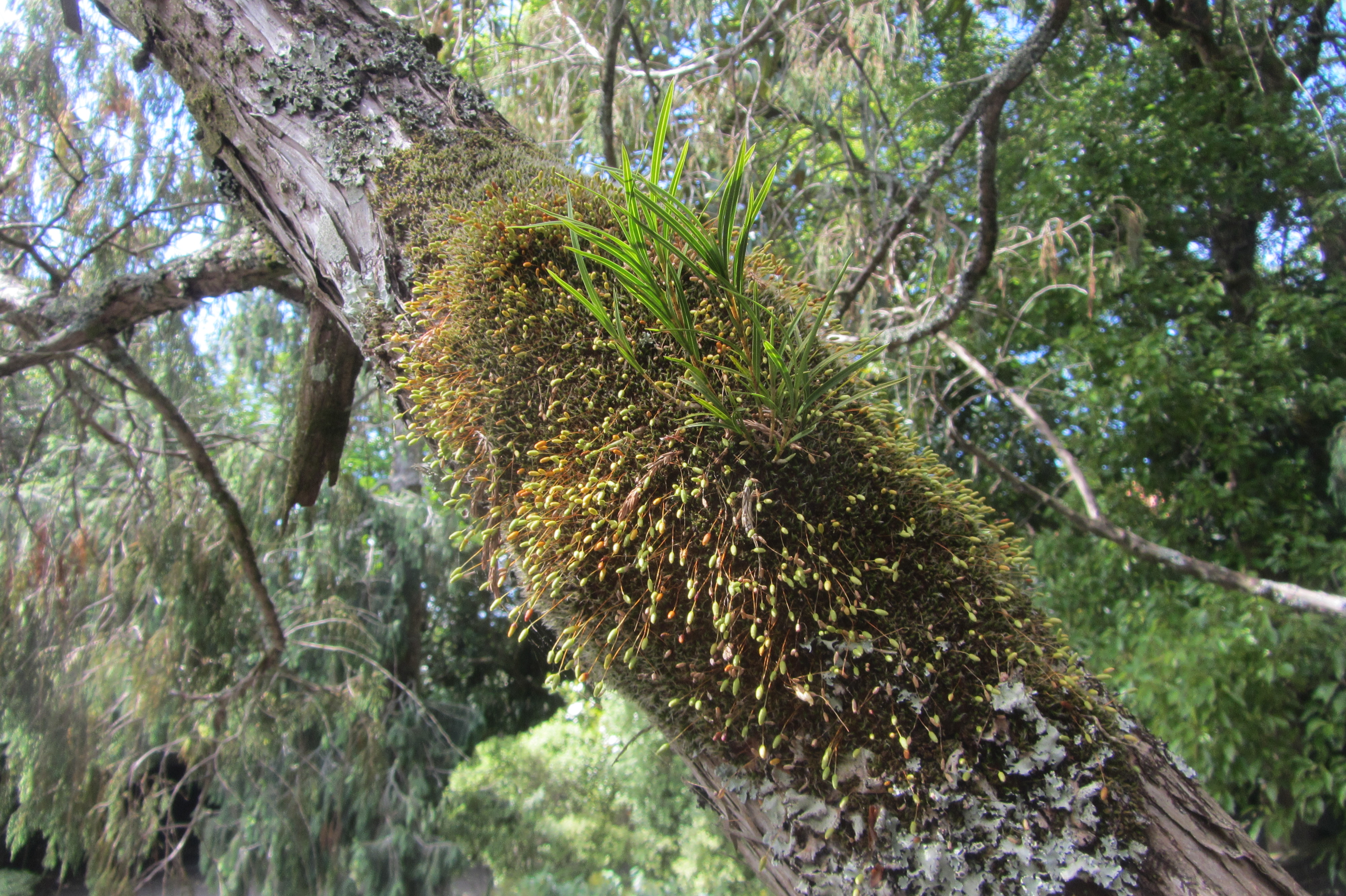
- Leptostomum macrocarpum

Scientific classification
- Kingdom: Plantae
- Division: Bryophyta
- Class: Bryopsida
- Subclass: Bryidae
- Order: Hypnodendrales
- Family: Leptostomataceae; R.Br.
- Genus: Leptostomum; R.Br.

Synonyms
- Helmsia Bosw.

= Leptostomum =

Genus of mosses

Leptostomum is a genus of mosses. It is the only genus in the monotypic family Leptostomataceae.

The species of this genus are found in Europe, Australasia and North America. They sometimes look like pincushions.

== Species ==
The following species are recognised in the genus Leptostomum:

- Leptostomum densum Thwaites & Mitt.
- Leptostomum depile Müll.Hal.
- Leptostomum erectum R.Br.
- Leptostomum gerrardii J.Shaw
- Leptostomum inclinans R.Br.
- Leptostomum macrocarpon (Hedw.) Bach.Pyl.
- Leptostomum menziesii R.Br.
- Leptostomum perfectum E.B.Bartram
- Leptostomum splachnoideum Hook. & Arn.
