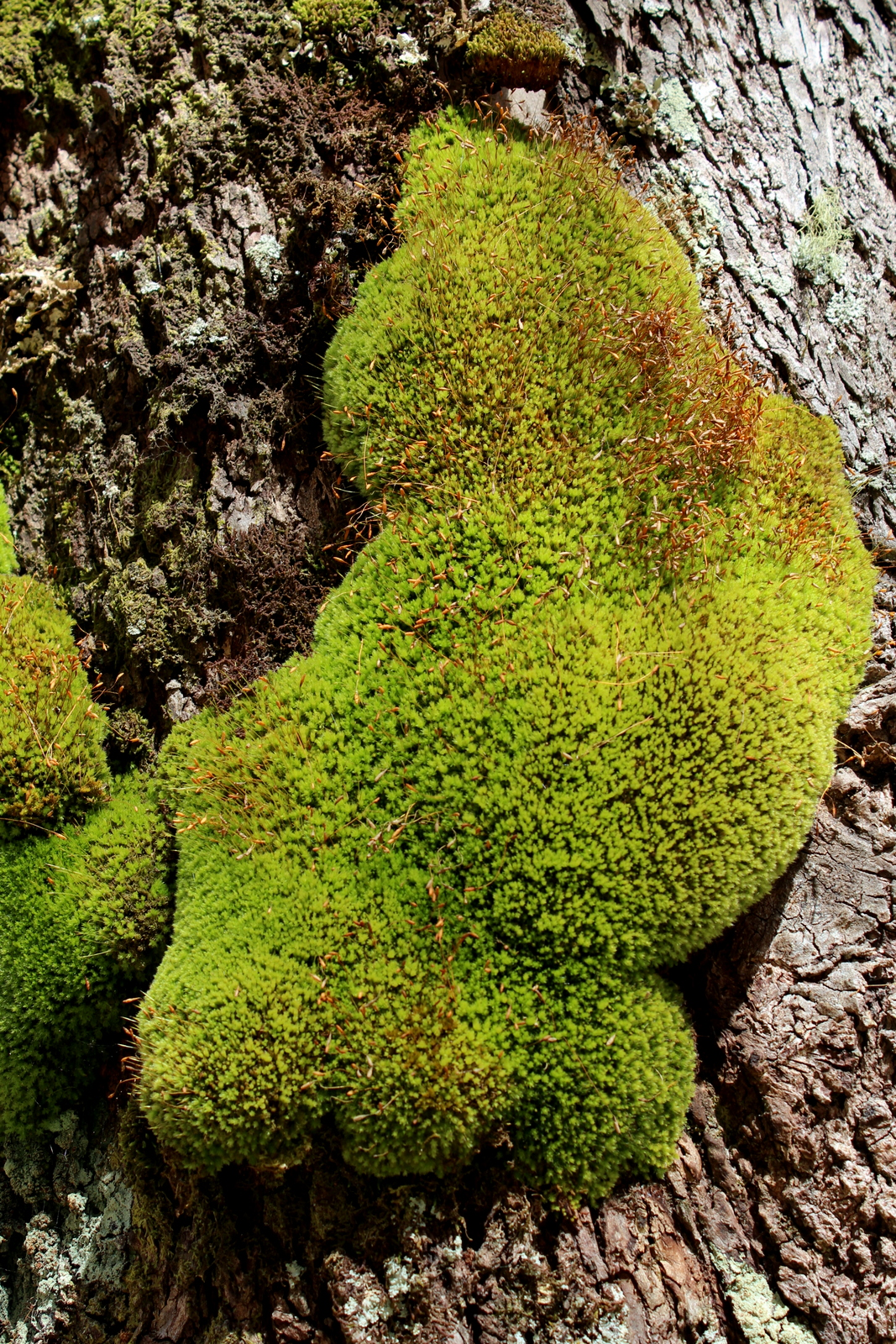
- Leptostomum inclinans at Barrington Tops State Conservation Area, Australia

Scientific classification
- Kingdom: Plantae
- Division: Bryophyta
- Class: Bryopsida
- Subclass: Bryidae
- Order: Hypnodendrales
- Family: Leptostomataceae
- Genus: Leptostomum
- Species: L. inclinans

Binomial name
- Leptostomum inclinans R.Br.

= Leptostomum inclinans =

Species of moss

Leptostomum inclinans known as the pincushion moss, is a species of moss found in southeastern Australia, New Zealand, and nearby islands. This species is commonly found as an epiphyte growing on tree trunks. However, it can also be found growing on soil or rocks.

This moss is characterized by closely-spaced stems and a dense covering of rhizoids. The leaves have an elongated, unbranched hairpoint, and the moss is recognizable by the numerous inclined capsules that protrude on long seta, giving it the appearance of a green pincushion.
