= Rhizopogon subg. Amylopogon =

Scientific classification
- Kingdom: Fungi
- Division: Basidiomycota
- Class: Agaricomycetes
- Order: Boletales
- Family: Rhizopogonaceae
- Genus: Rhizopogon
- Subgenus: Rhizopogon subg. Amylopogon (A.H. Sm.) Grubisha & Trappe

Subgenus of fungi

Rhizopogon subg. Amylopogon is a subgenus of Rhizopogon containing seven species.

- Rhizopogon arctostaphyli
- Rhizopogon brunsii
- Rhizopogon ellenae
- Rhizopogon kretzerae
- Rhizopogon pinyonensis
- Rhizopogon salebrosus
- Rhizopogon subpurpurascens

Subgenus Amylopogon are ectomycorrhizal fungi categorized as monotropoid mycorrhiza. These fungi are characterized by the presence of a mantle, Hartig net, unique fungal peg, and intracellular hyphal complexes. They are also classified by a specific and obligate symbiosis with members of Monotropoideae through a process known as myco-heterotrophy. Monotropoideae species depend on Amylopogon fungi for carbon which they in turn acquire from members of Pinus in a host specific tripartite Hartig net exchange.
