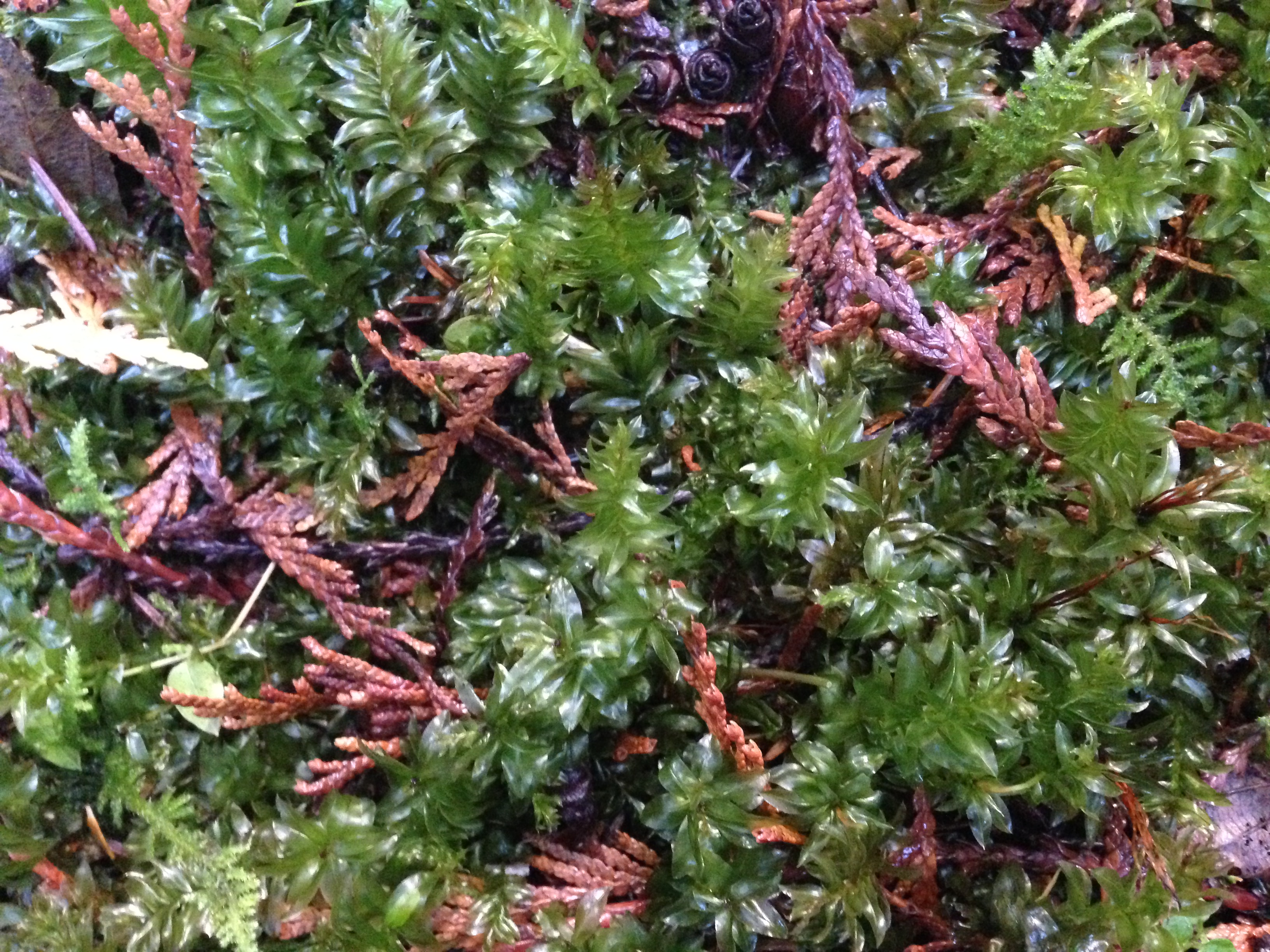
- Plagiomnium insigne

Scientific classification
- Kingdom: Plantae
- Division: Bryophyta
- Class: Bryopsida
- Subclass: Bryidae
- Order: Bryales
- Family: Mniaceae; Schwägr.

Genera
- See text

= Mniaceae =

Family of mosses

Mniaceae is a moss family in the order Bryales.

== Taxonomy ==
The family Mniaceae includes the following genera:

- Cinclidium Sw.
- Cyrtomnium Holmen
- Epipterygium Lindb.
- Leucolepis Lindb.
- Mielichhoferia Nees & Hornsch.
- Mnium Hedw.
- Orthomnion Wilson
- Plagiomnium T. J. Koponen
- Pohlia Hedw.
- Pseudobryum (Kindb.) T. J. Koponen
- Pseudopohlia R. S. Williams
- Rhizomnium (Broth.) T. J. Koponen
- Schizymenium Harv.
- Synthetodontium Cardot
- Trachycystis Lindberg
