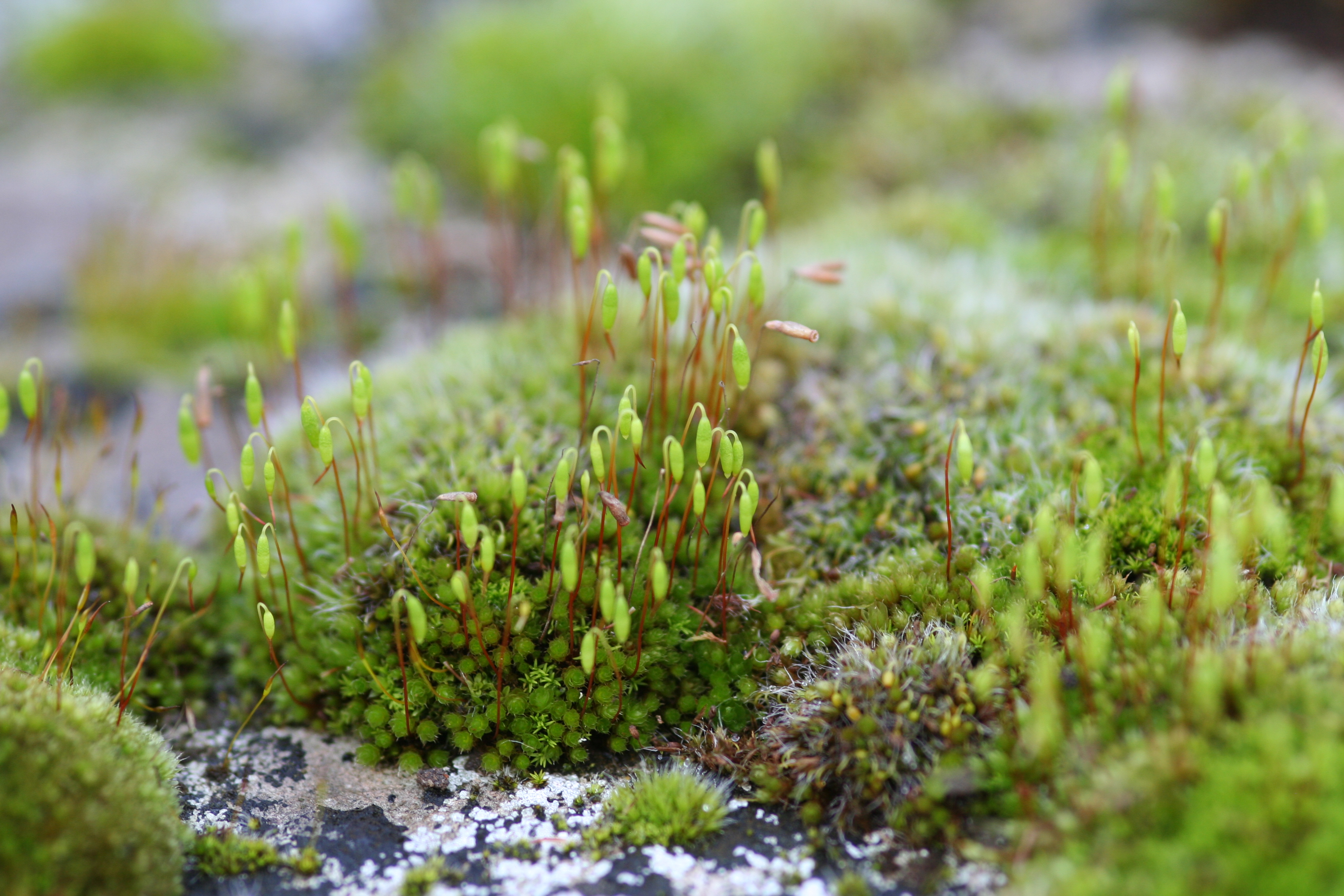
- Bryum capillare

Scientific classification
- Kingdom: Plantae
- Division: Bryophyta
- Class: Bryopsida
- Subclass: Bryidae
- Superorder: Bryanae
- Order: Bryales; Limpr.

Families
- Bryaceae; Leptostomataceae; Mniaceae; Phyllodrepaniaceae; Pulchrinodaceae

= Bryales =

Order of mosses

Bryales is an order of mosses.

== Taxonomy ==
The order Bryales includes the following five families:

- Bryaceae Schwägr.
- Leptostomataceae Schwägr.
- Mniaceae Schwägr.
- Phyllodrepaniaceae Schwägr.
- Pulchrinodaceae D. Quandt, N.E. Bell & Stech

The order used to be defined broadly to include the Rhizogoniales, but is now used in a narrower sense. A species of the Mniaceae genus Rhizomnium, Rhizomnium dentatum, was described from fossil gametophytes preserved in Baltic amber.

The families Catoscopiaceae and Pseudoditrichaceae were previously placed in Bryales, but are now placed in Dicranidae as part of an early branching grade.
