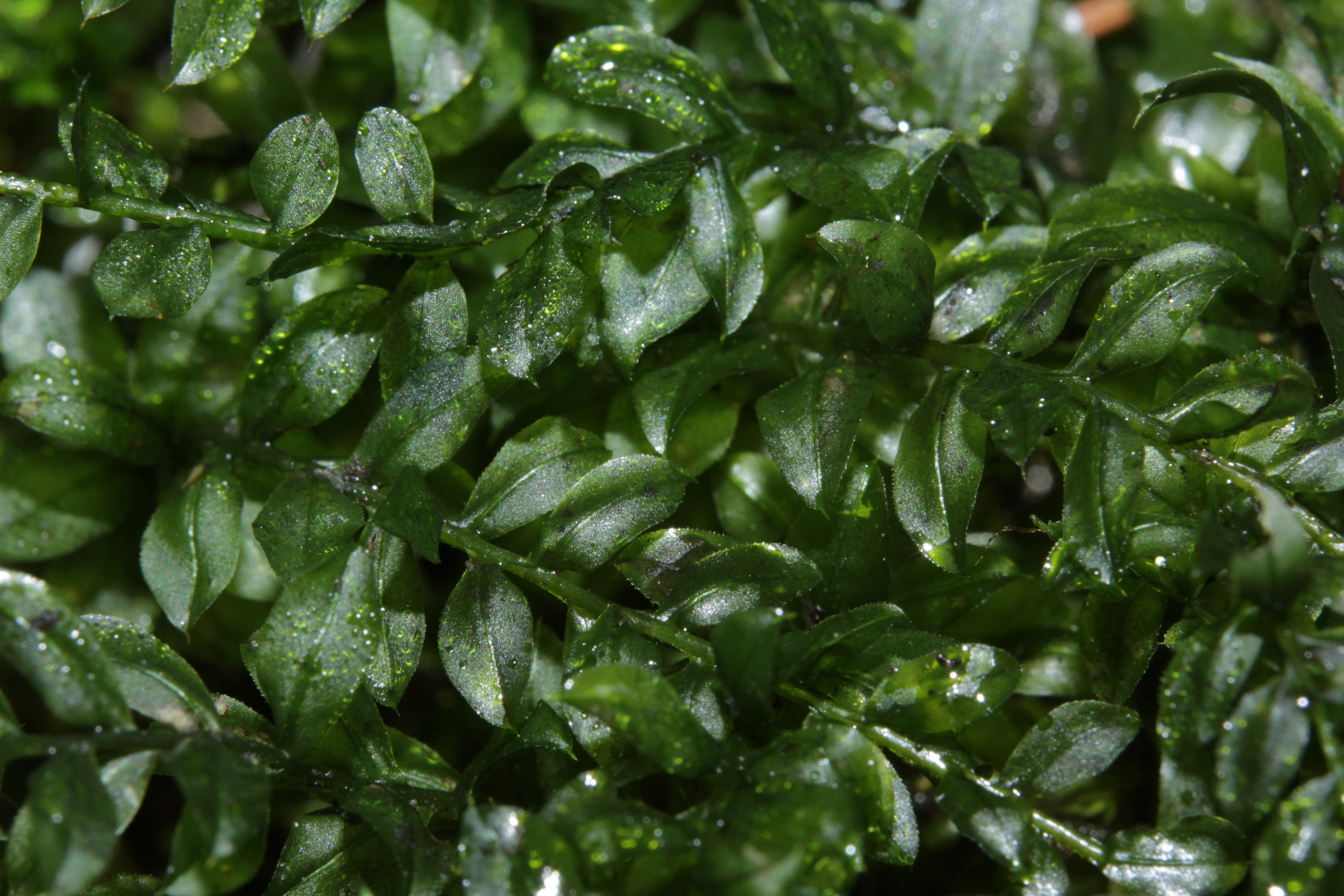

Scientific classification
- Kingdom: Plantae
- Division: Bryophyta
- Class: Bryopsida
- Subclass: Bryidae
- Order: Bryales
- Family: Mniaceae
- Genus: Plagiomnium
- Species: P. medium

Binomial name
- Plagiomnium medium (Bruch & Schimp.) T.J.Kop.

= Plagiomnium medium =

Species of moss

Plagiomnium medium, commonly known as Alpine thyme-moss or intermediate plagiomnium moss, is a moss found in montane habitats in the Northern Hemisphere.

Research published in 1988 showed that is a hybrid of P. ellipticum and P. insigne via an allopolyploid process, previously considered to be absent in bryophyte evolution.

In the UK it is classified as near threatened. More than 10% of all UK populations occur in the Cairngorms National Park in Scotland including sites in the Lairig Ghru and on the plateau of Lochnagar.
