= Stefan Andreas Rensing =

German plant biologist

Stefan Andreas Rensing (born June 1967) is a German plant biologist, bioinformatician, and university administrator. He is professor of Data Integration and Systems Modelling of Eukaryotic Model Organisms at the University of Freiburg. His research focuses on plant evolution, comparative genomics, bioinformatics, and systems biology.

He is a member of German Botanical Society, the European Plant Science Organisation (EPSO), the International Association of Bryologists (IAB), the International Society of Endocytobiology (ISE), and the German Life Sciences Association (VBIO).

== Education and career ==
Rensing studied biology at the University of Freiburg, receiving a Diplom degree in 1993. He completed his doctoral degree (Dr. rer. nat.) in cell biology in 1995 under the supervision of Peter Sitte and Uwe-G. Maier. In 2007, he obtained his habilitation in bioinformatics and systems biology from the University of Freiburg.

He served as a senior scientist and laboratory head at BASF Plant Science and the University of Freiburg, where he worked on functional genomics using the moss Physcomitrium patens. Between 2007 and 2008, Rensing directed the Core Facility for Data Management within the Freiburg Initiative for Systems Biology (FRISYS).

In 2012, Rensing was appointed Professor of Plant Cell Biology at the University of Marburg. He was promoted to a W3 professorship in 2019 and served as Vice Dean and then Dean of the Department of Biology.

== Research and scholarly work ==
Rensing's research focuses on plant evolution, comparative genomics, bioinformatics, systems biology, and molecular plant biology. Much of his work has centered on bryophytes, particularly the moss Physcomitrium patens (formerly Physcomitrella patens), which he has helped establish as a model organism for studying plant evolution, development, and the transition of plants from aquatic to terrestrial environments. His research integrates genome sequencing, transcriptomics, phylogenomics, and computational biology to investigate the origins and diversification of land plants.

Rensing has contributed to international genome sequencing and comparative genomics projects involving plants, algae, fungi, and other eukaryotic organisms. He has participated in genome consortia for species including Physcomitrium patens, Ceratodon purpureus, Funaria hygrometrica, Takakia lepidozioides, Selaginella moellendorffii, Chara braunii, Azolla filiculoides and Volvox carteri.
