= Annual vs. perennial plant evolution =

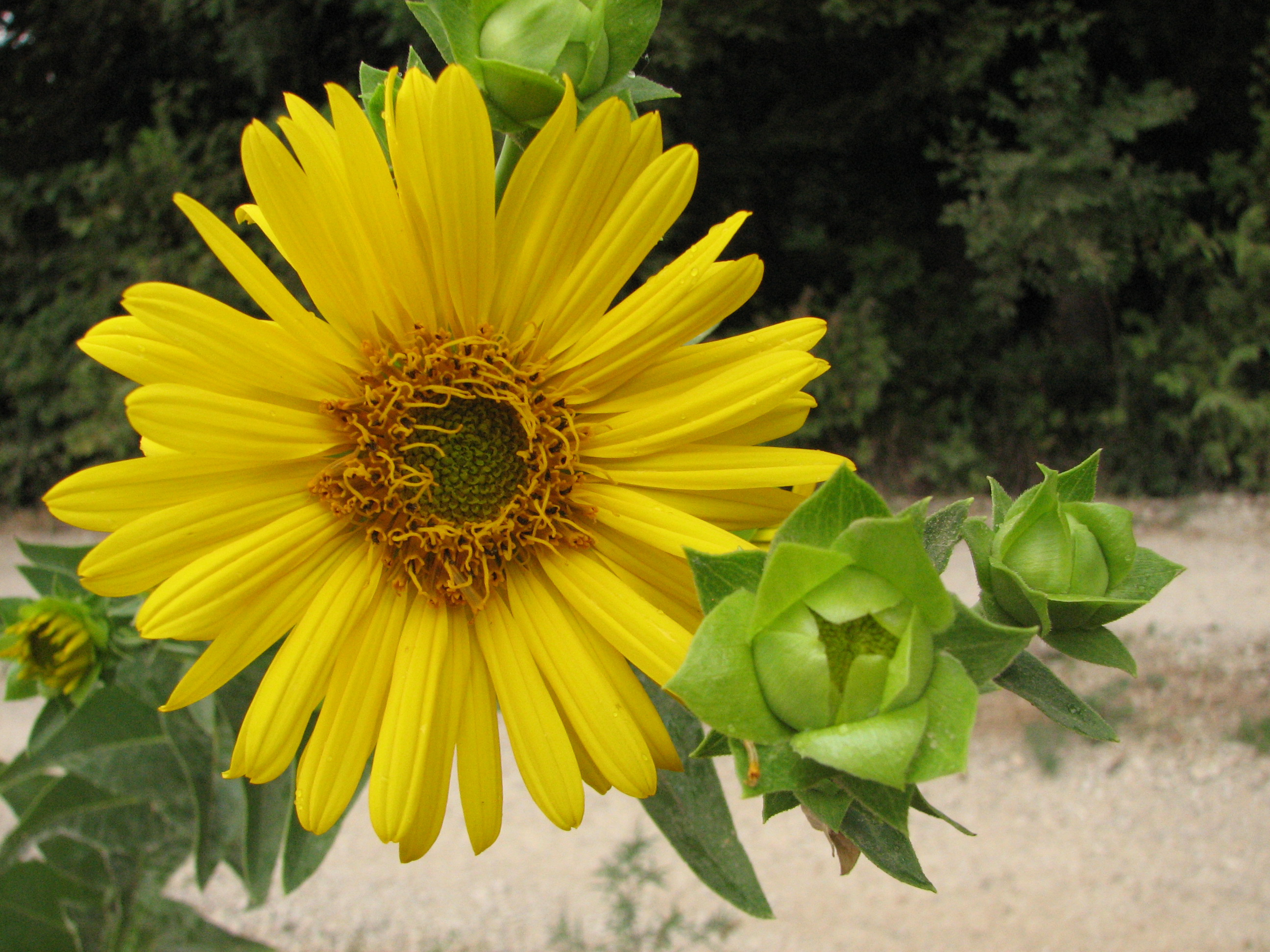
Perennial Silphium integrifolium species (Asteraceae), which is being bred for edible seeds.

Annuality (living and reproducing in a single year) and perenniality (living more than two years) represent major life history strategies within plant lineages. These traits can shift from one to another over both macroevolutionary and microevolutionary timescales. While perenniality and annuality are often described as discrete either-or traits, they often occur in a continuous spectrum. The complex history of switches between annual and perennial habit involve both natural and artificial causes, and studies of this fluctuation have importance to sustainable agriculture. (Note that "perennial" here refers to both woody and herbaceous perennial species.)

Globally, only 6% of all plant species and 15% of herbaceous plants (excluding trees and shrubs) are annuals. The annual life cycle has independently emerged in over 120 different plant families throughout the entire angiosperm phylogeny. The life-history theory posits that annual plants are favored when adult mortality is higher than seedling (or seed) mortality, i.e., annuals will dominate environments with disturbances or high temporal variability, reducing adult survival. This hypothesis finds support in observations of increased prevalence of annuals in regions with hot-dry summers, with elevated adult mortality and high seed persistence. Furthermore, the evolution of the annual life cycle under hot-dry summer in different families makes it one of the best examples of convergent evolution. Additionally, annual prevalence is also positively affected by year-to-year variability.

According to some studies, either the trait of annuality or perenniality may be ancestral. This contradicts the commonly held belief that annuality is a derived trait from an ancestral perennial life form, as is suggested by a regarded plant population biology text.

== Spatiotemporal scale ==
Above the species level, plant lineages clearly vary in their tendency for annuality or perenniality (e.g., wheat vs. oaks). On a microevolutionary timescale, a single plant species may show different annual or perennial ecotypes (e.g., adapted to dry or tropical range), as in the case of the wild progenitor of rice (Oryza rufipogon). Indeed, ability to perennate (live more than one year) may vary within a single population of a species.

== Underlying mechanisms: Trade-offs ==
Annuality and perenniality are complex traits involving many underlying, often quantitative, genotypic and phenotypic factors. They are often determined by a trade-off between allocation to sexual (flower) structures and asexual (vegetative) structures. Switches between the annual and perennial habit are known to be common among herbaceous angiosperms.

Increased allocation to reproduction early in life generally leads to a decrease in survival later in life (senescence); this occurs in both annual and perennial semelparous plants. Exceptions to this pattern include long-lived clonal (see ramets section below) and long-lived non-clonal perennial species (e.g., bristlecone pine).

== Associated traits ==
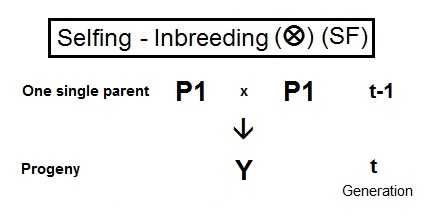

Many traits involving mating patterns (e.g., outcrossing or selfing) and life history strategies (e.g., annual or perennial) are inherently linked.

=== Typical annual-associated traits ===
==== Self-fertilization ====
Self-fertilization (selfing, or autogamy) is more common in annual compared to perennial herbs. Since annuals typically have only one opportunity for reproduction, selfing provides a reliable source of fertilization. However, switches to selfing in annuals may result in an "evolutionary dead end," in the sense that it is probably unlikely to return to an outcrossing (allogamous) state. Selfing and inbreeding can also result in the accumulation of deleterious alleles, resulting in inbreeding depression.

==== Semelparity ====
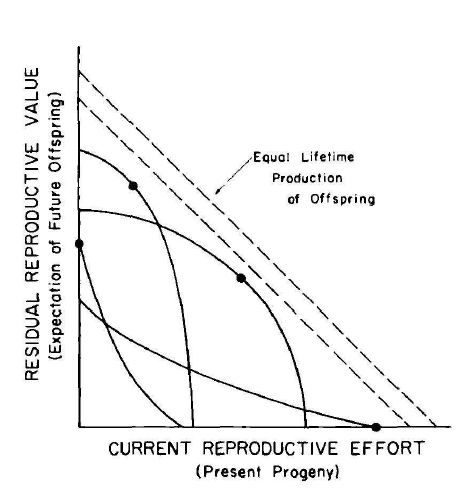
Semelparous vs. iteroparous reproductive strategies.

All annual plants are considered semelparous (a.k.a., monocarpy or big-bang reproduction), i.e., they reproduce once before death. Even semelparity exerts some plasticity in terms of seed-production timing over the year (see "Anomalies" section). That is, it is uncommon for all offspring to be generated at exactly the same time, which would be considered the extreme end of semelparity. Instead offspring are usually generated in discrete packages (as a sort of micro-iteroparous strategy), and the temporal spacing of these reproductive events varies by organism. This is attributed to phenotypic plasticity.

Biennial plants (living two years and reproducing in the second) are also considered semelparous.

==== Seed bank ====
Although annuals have no vegetative regrowth from year to year, many retain a dormant population back-up underground in the form of a seed bank. The seed bank serves as an annual's source of age structure in the sense that often not all seeds will germinate each year. Thus, each year's population will consist of individuals of different ages in terms of seed dormancy times. The seed bank also helps to ensure the annual's survival and genetic integrity in variable or disturbed habitats (e.g., a desert), where good growing conditions are not guaranteed every year. Not all annuals, however, retain a seed bank. As far as population density, annuals with seed banks are predicted to be more temporally variable yet more spatially constant over time, while plants with no seed bank would be expected to be patchy (spatially variable).

=== Typical perennial-associated traits ===
==== Cross-fertilization ====
Certain non-selfing reproductive adaptations, such as dioecy (obligate outcrossing via separate male and female individuals), may have arisen in long lived herbaceous and woody species due to negative side effects of selfing in these species, notably genetic load and inbreeding depression. Among angiosperms, dioecy is known to be substantially less common than self-incompatibility. Dioecy is more typical of trees and shrubs compared to annual species.

==== Iteroparity ====
Most perennials are iteroparous (or polycarpic), which means they reproduce multiple times during their lifespan.

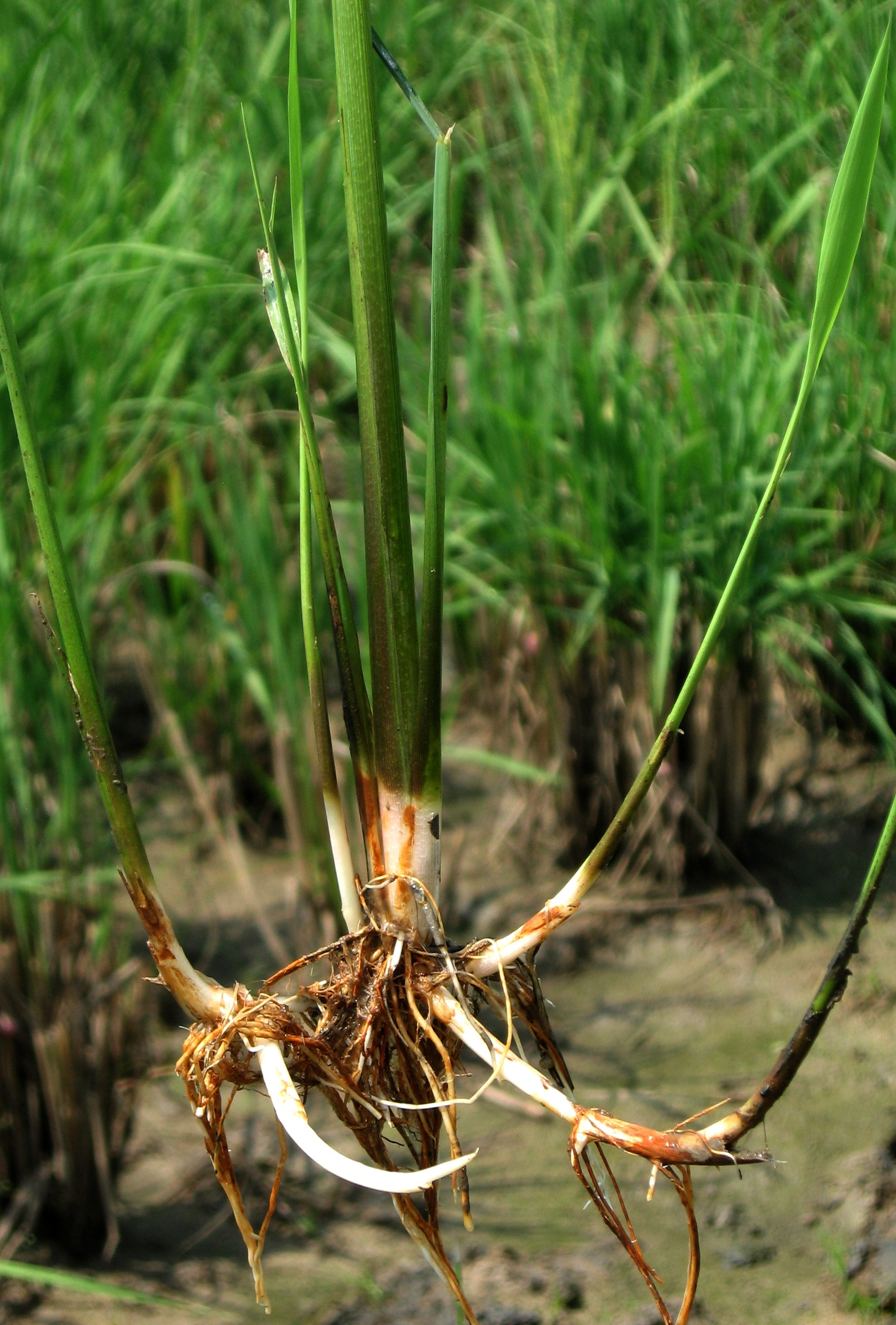
Rice rhizomes.

==== Persistence of ramets ====
Ramets are vegetative, clonal extensions of a central genet. Common examples are rhizomes (modified stem), tillers, and stolons. A plant is perennial if the birth rate of ramets exceeds their death rate. Several of the oldest known plants are clonal. Some genets have been reported to be many thousands of years old, and a steady rate of branching likely aids in avoiding senescence. The oldest reported minimum age of a single genet is 43,600 years, for Lomatia tasmanica W.M.Curtis. It is hypothesized that some perennial plants even display negative senescence, in which their fecundity and survival increase with age.

Examples of plants with rhizomatous growth include perennial Sorghum and rice, which likely share similar underlying genes controlling rhizome growth. In wheat (Thinopyrum), perenniality is associated with production of a secondary set of tillers (stems arising from the crown's apical meristem) following the reproductive phase. This is called post-sexual cycle regrowth (PSCR). Such long-lived genets in a population may provide a buffer against random environmental fluctuations.

==== Polyploidy ====
There is a possible connection between polyploidy (having more than two copies of one's chromosomes) and perenniality. One potential explanation is that both polyploids (larger in size) and asexual reproduction (common in perennials) tend to be selected for in inhospitable extremes of a species' distribution. One example could be the intricate polyploidy of native Australian perennial Glycine species.

==== Niche conservatism ====
Woody species have been found to occupy fewer climatic niches than herbaceous species, which was suggested to be a result of their slower generation time; such differences in adaptation may result in niche conservatism among perennial species, in the sense that their climatic niche has not changed much over evolutionary time.

== Anomalies ==
=== Semelparity and iteroparity ===
Semelparity in perennials is rare but occurs in several types of plants, likely due to adaptive changes for greater seed allocation in response to seed predation (although other drivers, such as biased pollination, have been proposed).

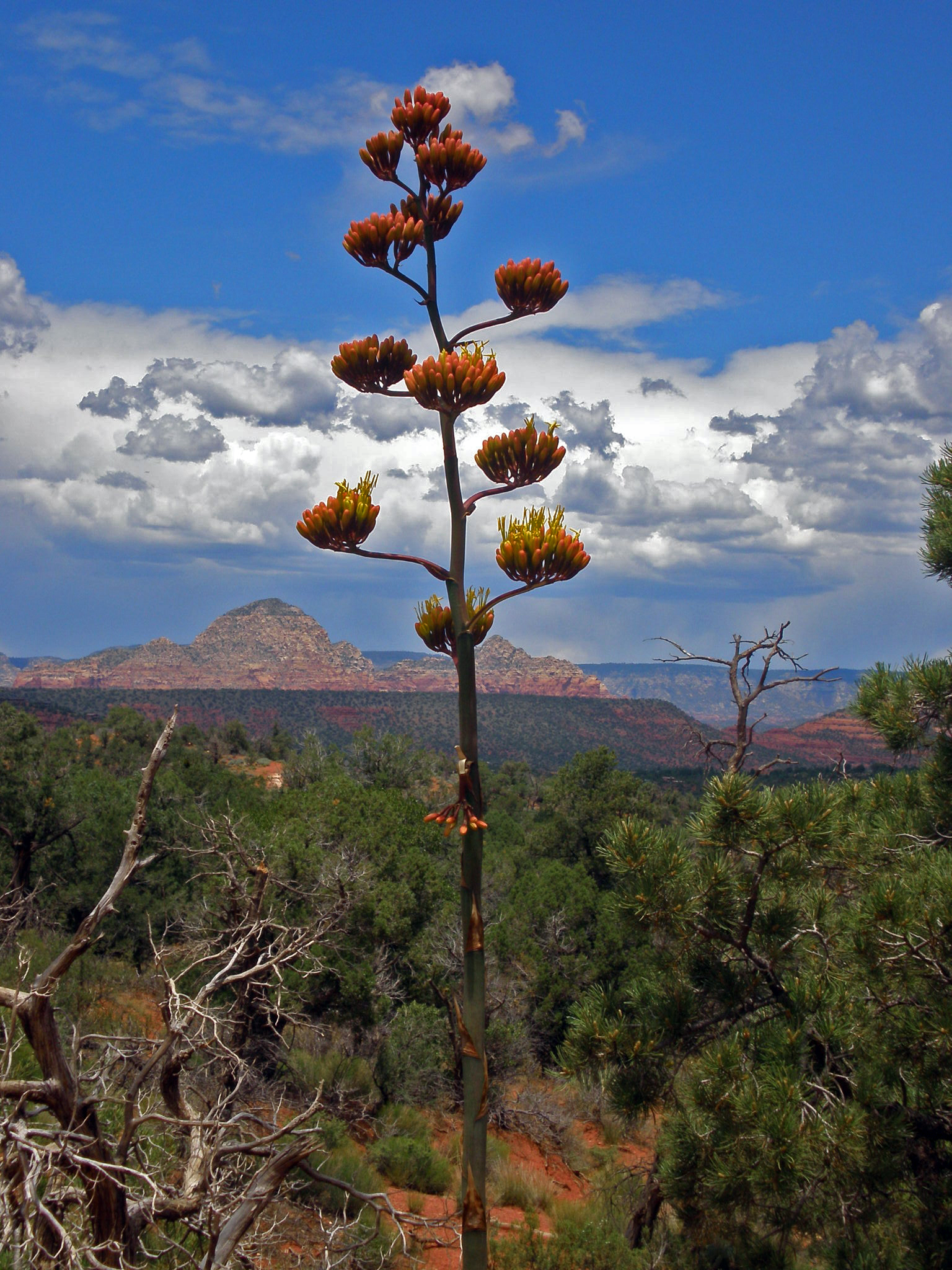
Century plant (Agave deserti) inflorescence; a semelparous perennial.

List of semelparous perennials:

- Carrot (Daucus carota subsp. sativus)
- Agave
  - Agave deserti (century plant)
- Hesperoyucca whipplei
- semelparous bamboo
  - Phyllostachys bambusoides
- Corypha umbraculifera (Talipot palm)
- Lobelia telekii
- Senecio jacobaea (ragwort)
- Cynoglossum officinale

=== Mating system ===
The Polemoniaceae (phlox) family shows considerable flexibility in both life history and mating system, showing combinations of annual / selfing, annual / outcrossing, perennial / selfing, and perennial / outcrossing lineages. These switches indicate a more ecologically determined, rather than a phylogenetically fixed, change in habit.

== Environmental drivers ==
High environmental stochasticity, i.e., random fluctuations in climate or disturbance regime, can be buffered by both the annual and perennial habit. However, the annual habit is more closely associated with a stochastic environment, whether that is naturally or artificially induced. This is due to higher seedling compared to adult survival in such stochastic environments; common examples are arid environments such as deserts as well as frequently disturbed habitats (e.g., cropland). Iteroparous perennial species are more likely to persist in habitats where adult survival is favored over seedling survival (e.g., canopied, moist). This adult/juvenile trade-off can be described succinctly in the following equations:

λ_{a} = cm_{a}

λ_{p} = cm_{p} + p

m_{a} > (or <) m_{p} + (p/c)

(Silvertown & Charlesworth, 2001, p. 296)

Where: λ_{a} = rate of growth of annual population. λ_{p} = rate of growth of perennial population. c = survival to reproductive age (flowering). m_{a} = seeds produced for each annual individual (average). m_{p} = seeds produced for each perennial individual. p = adult survival.

If m_{a} > m_{p} + (p/c), the annual habit has greater fitness. If m_{a} < m_{p} + (p/c), the perennial habit has greater fitness. Thus a great deal of the fitness balance depends on the reproductive allocation to seeds, which is why annuals are known for greater reproductive effort than perennials.

Different climate and disturbance patterns may also cause demographic changes in populations.

== Evolution rate ==
The annual vs. perennial trait has been empirically associated with differing subsequent rates of molecular evolution within multiple plant lineages. The perennial trait is generally associated with a slower rate of evolution than the annual trait when looking at both non-coding and coding DNA. Generation time is often implicated as one of the major factors contributing to this disparity, with perennials having longer generation times and likewise an overall slower mutation and adaptation rate. This may result in higher genetic diversity in annual lineages.

Plant taxon groups that have evolved both annual and perennial life forms.

Taxon group	Shift	Reported Cause	Sequence-type	Geographic Region	Literature
Bellis (daisies)	perennial→annual	aridity	nrDNA (ITS)	Western Mediterranean	
Castilleja (Indian paintbrush)	annual→perennial		cpDNA (trnL-F, rps16); nrDNA (ITS, ETS)	Western North America	
Ehrharta (veldtgrass)	perennial→annual	aridity	cpDNA (trnL-F); nrDNA (ITS1)	South African Cape	
Houstonia	perennial→annual		cpDNA (trnL-F intron); nrDNA (ITS)		
Medicago (alfalfa)	annual→perennial (possibly perennial→annual instead)		nrDNA (ITS, ETS)		
Nemesia	perennial→annual	change in precipitation	cpDNA (trnL); nrDNA (ITS, ETS)	South African Cape	
Oryza (rice)	perennial→annual	artificial selection for loss of rhizomes	coding nuclear DNA	Asia	
Polemoniaceae (phlox)	annual→perennial; perennial→annual	ann.→peren.: ecology peren.→ann.: ecology (desert climate)	cpDNA (matK)		
Sidalcea (checker mallow)	perennial→annual	aridity	nrDNA (ITS, ETS)	Western North America	

== Artificial selection ==
Artificial selection seems to have favored the annual habit, at least in the case of herbaceous species, likely due to fast generation time and therefore a quick response to domestication and improvement efforts. However, woody perennials also exemplify a major group of crops, especially fruit trees and nuts. High yield herbaceous perennial grain or seed crops, however, are virtually nonexistent, despite potential agronomic benefits. Several common herbaceous perennial fruit, herbs, and vegetables exist, however; see perennial plants for a list.

Annual and perennial species are known to respond to selection in different ways. For instance, annual domesticates tend to experience more severe genetic bottlenecks than perennial species, which, at least in those clonally propagated, are more prone to continuation of somatic mutations. Cultivated woody perennials are also known for their longer generation time, outcrossing with wild species (introducing new genetic variation), and variety of geographic origin. Some woody perennials (e.g., grapes or fruit trees) also have a secondary source of genetic variation within their rootstock (base to which the above-ground portion, the scion, is grafted).

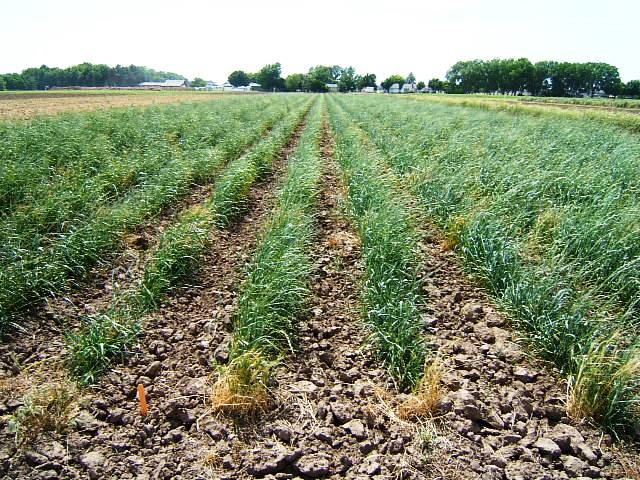
Thinopyrum intermedium: perennial wheat.

=== Current agricultural applications ===
Compared to annual monocultures (which occupy c. 2/3 of the world's agricultural land), perennial crops provide protection against soil erosion, better conserve water and nutrients, and undergo a longer growing season. Wild perennial species are often more resistant to pests than annual cultivars, and many perennial crop wild relatives have already been hybridized with annual crops to confer this resistance. Perennial species also typically store more atmospheric carbon than annual crops, which can help to mitigate climate change. Unfavorable characteristics of such herbaceous perennials include energetically unfavorable trade-offs and long periods of juvenile non-productivity. Some institutions, such as The Land Institute, have begun to develop perennial grains, such as Kernza (perennial wheat), as potential crops. Some traits underlying perenniality may involve relatively simple networks of traits, which can be conferred through hybrid crosses, as in the case of perennial wheat crossed with annual wheat.

== See also ==
- Semelparity and iteroparity
- Annual plant
- Perennial plant
- Biennial plant
- Life history theory
- Perennial grain
- The Land Institute
- Plant evolution
- Plant strategies
