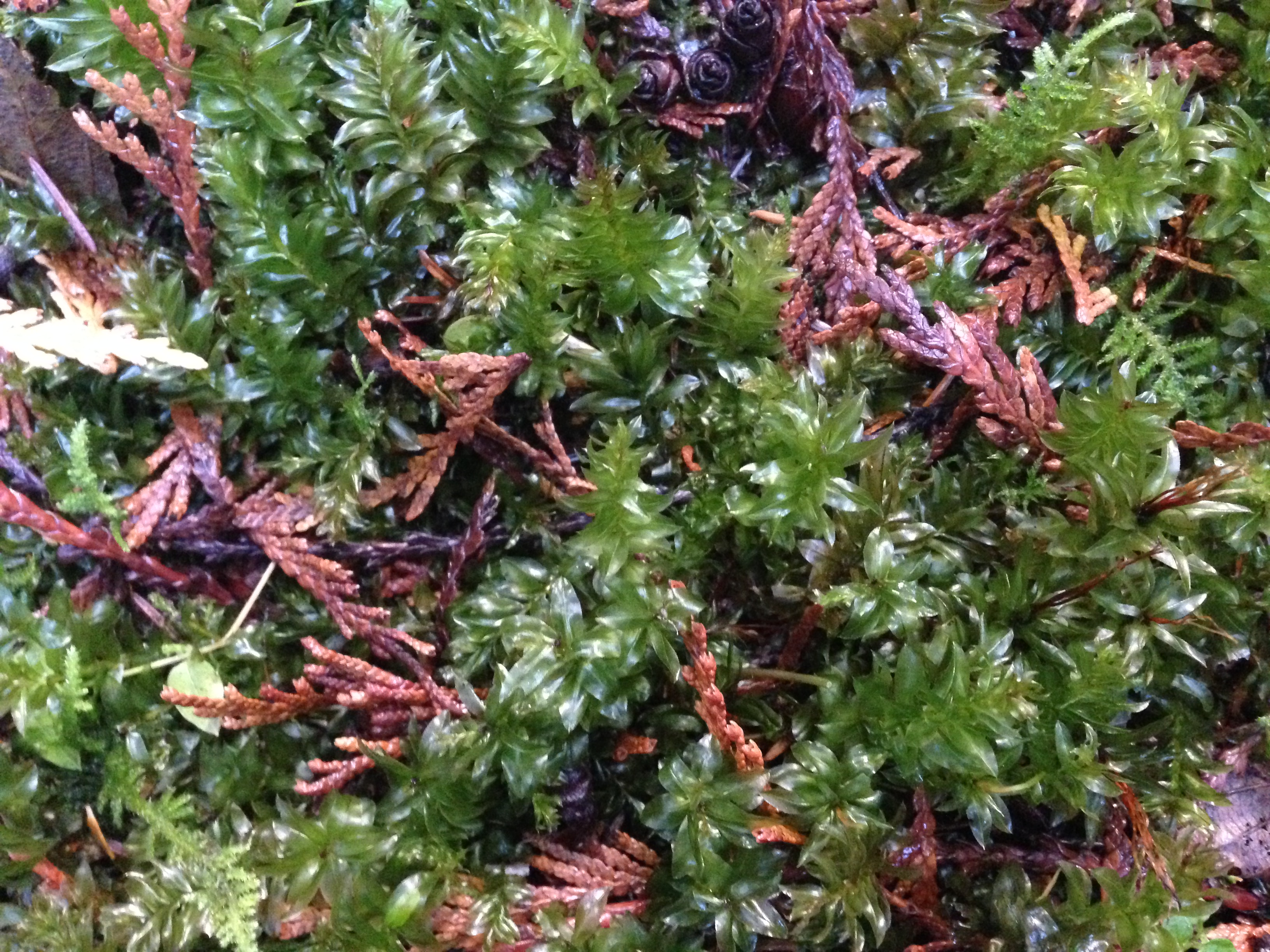
- Plagiomnium insigne gametophytes photographed in Washington Park
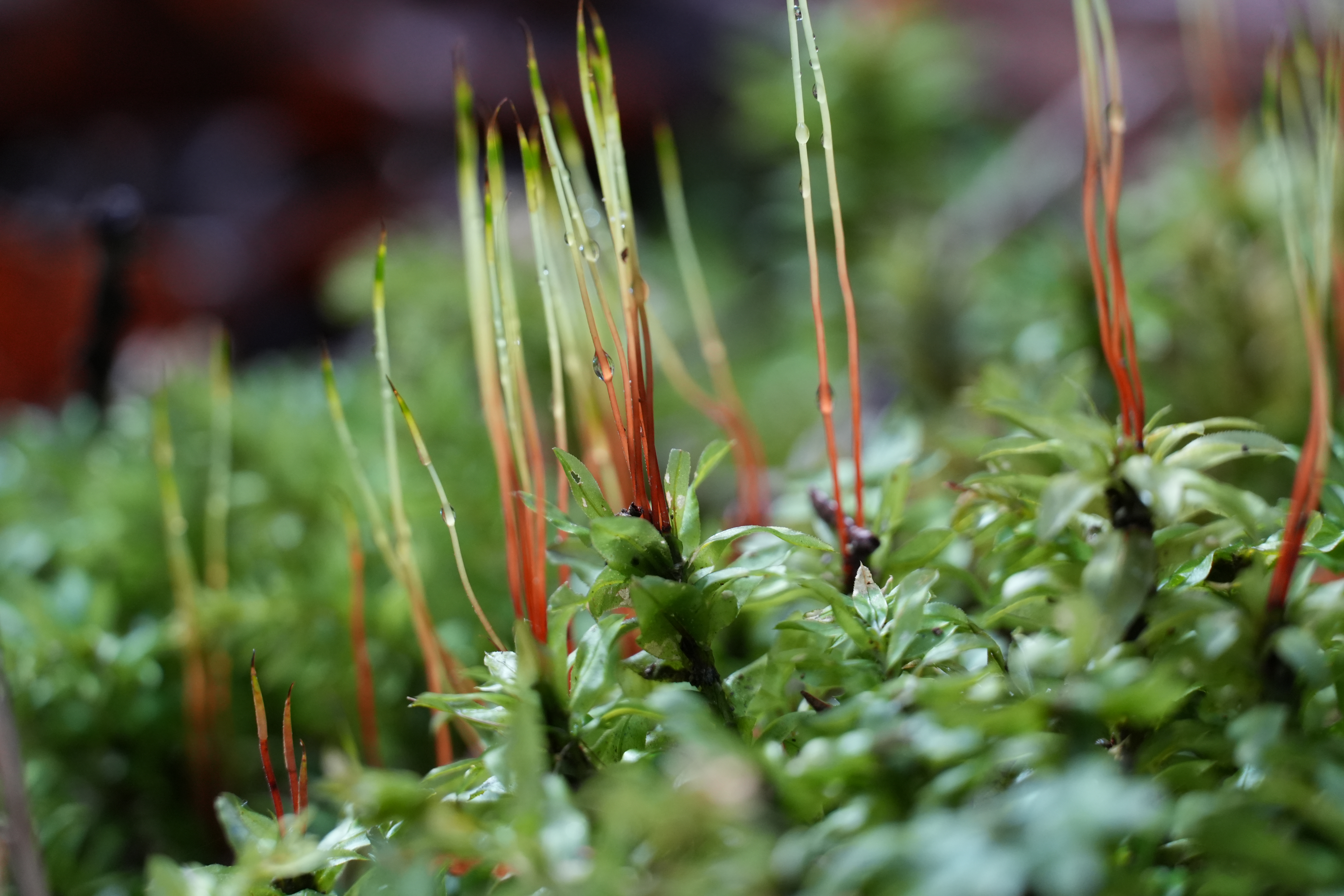
- Plagiomnium insigne sporophytes photographed in Pierce County

Conservation status
- Apparently Secure (NatureServe)

Scientific classification
- Kingdom: Plantae
- Division: Bryophyta
- Class: Bryopsida
- Subclass: Bryidae
- Order: Bryales
- Family: Mniaceae
- Genus: Plagiomnium
- Species: P. insigne

Binomial name
- Plagiomnium insigne (Mitt.) T.J.Kop.

Synonyms
- Mnium insigne Mitt.; Mnium seligeri Jur. ex Warnst.; Astrophyllum insigne (Mitt.) Lindb.; Astrophyllum seligeri (Jur. ex Warnst.) Lindb.; Astrophyllum cuspidatum subsp. seligeri (Jur. ex Warnst.) Kindb.; Mnium medium subsp. robustum Kindb.; Mnium affine var. intermedium (Kindb.) Paris; Mnium robustum (Kindb.) Kindb.; Mnium affine subsp. seligeri (Jur. ex Warnst.) Kindb.; Mnium rugicum subsp. seligeri (Jur. ex Warnst.) Meyl.; Orthomnion insigne (Mitt.) T.J.Kop. & Yu Sun; Astrophyllum cuspidatum var. intermedium (Kindb.) Arnell

= Plagiomnium insigne =

Species of moss

Plagiomnium insigne, commonly known as badge moss or coastal leafy moss, is a species of moss endemic to western North America.

== Distribution and habitat ==
Plagiomnium insigne is found only in western North America, ranging from south-eastern Alaska in the north to central California in the south and as far east as western Montana. In Canada it occurs in the provinces of Alberta and British Columbia, while in the United States it can be found in the states of Alaska, California, Idaho, Montana, Oregon, Washington, and Wyoming. It is occurs from sea level to the subalpine zone, and typically grows in shaded areas on humus and soil or on rotten logs. It can be found in forests (particularly redwood forests), swampy areas, and urban areas such as lawns.

== Description ==
The plants are large and showy, usually between 3–8 cm (1.2–3.1 in) high. They have wide-spreading, glistening leaves when moist that become shrivelled and dull when dry. The fertile plants are unisexual. The male plants can be distinguished by their conspicuously flattened heads. The sterile stems are arched, like those of strawberries. Badge moss is the largest mnium. It can be distinguished from magnificent leafy moss (Plagiomnium venustum) by its unisexual plants, leaf edges that extend down the stems for a noticeable length, and 3-6 stalked capsules per plant.
