= Biennial plant =

Flowering plant that takes two years to complete its biological life cycle

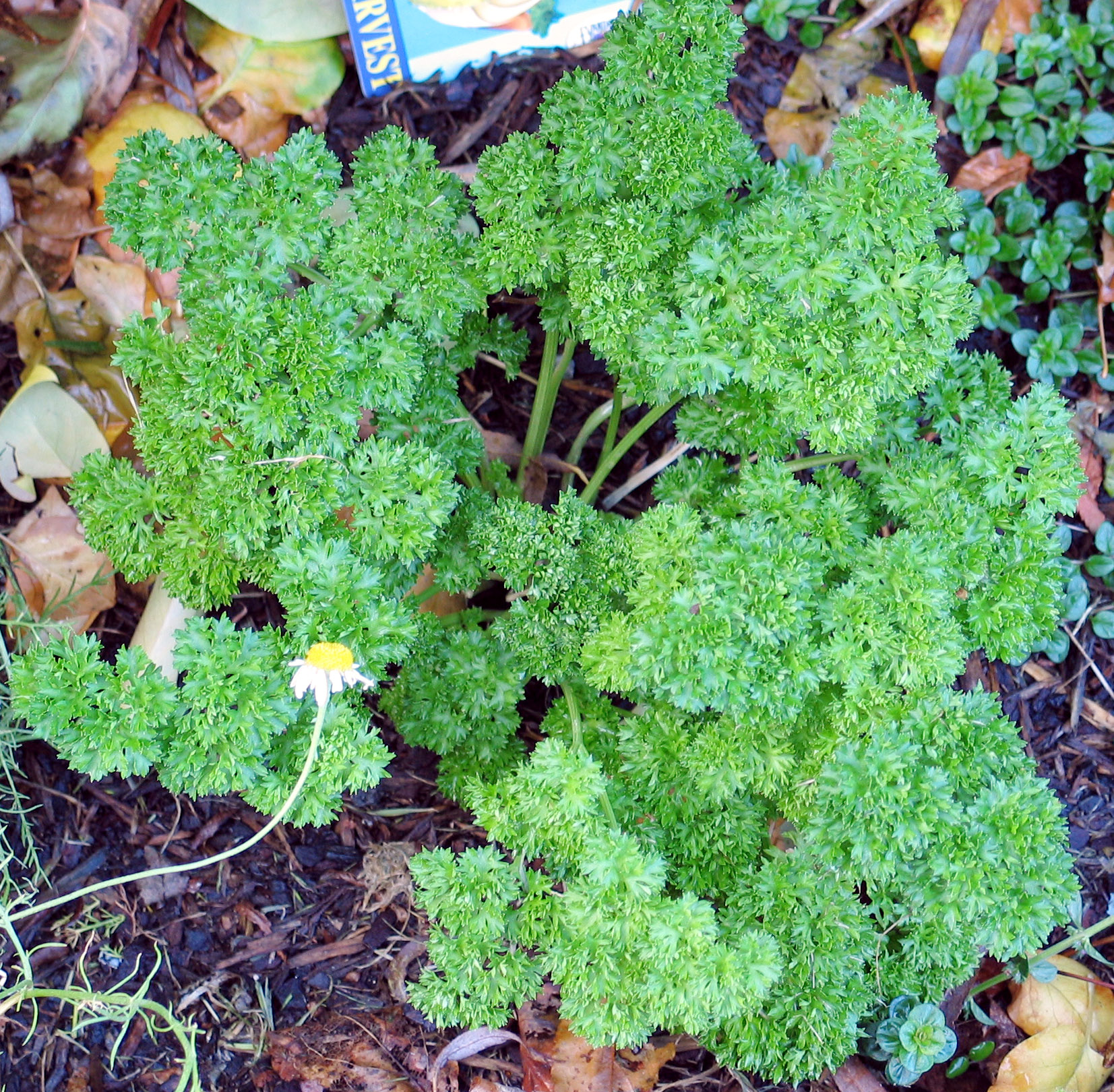
Parsley is a common example of a biennial plant.

A biennial plant (bi- + -ennial, two-year) is a flowering plant that, generally in a temperate climate, takes two years to complete its biological life cycle.

== Background ==
In its first year, the biennial plant undergoes primary growth, during which its vegetative structures (leaves, stems, and roots) develop. Usually, the stem of the plant remains short and the leaves are low to the ground, forming a rosette. After one year's growing season, the plant enters a period of dormancy for the colder month. Many biennials require a cold treatment, or vernalization before they will flower. During spring or summer, the stem of the biennial plant elongates greatly, or "bolts". The plant then flowers, producing fruits and seeds before it finally dies. There are far fewer biennials than either perennial plants or annual plants.

Biennials do not always follow a strict two-year life cycle: plants in the wild can take three or more years to mature. Rosette leaf size has been found to predict when a plant may enter its second stage of flowering and seed production. Alternatively, under extreme climatic conditions, a biennial plant may complete its life cycle rapidly (e.g., in three months instead of two years). This is quite common in vegetable or flower seedlings that were vernalized before they were planted in the ground. This behavior leads to many normally biennial plants being treated as annuals in some areas. Conversely, an annual grown under extremely favorable conditions may have highly successful seed propagation, giving it the appearance of being biennial or perennial. Some short-lived perennials may appear to be biennial rather than perennial. True biennials flower only once, while many perennials will flower every year once mature.

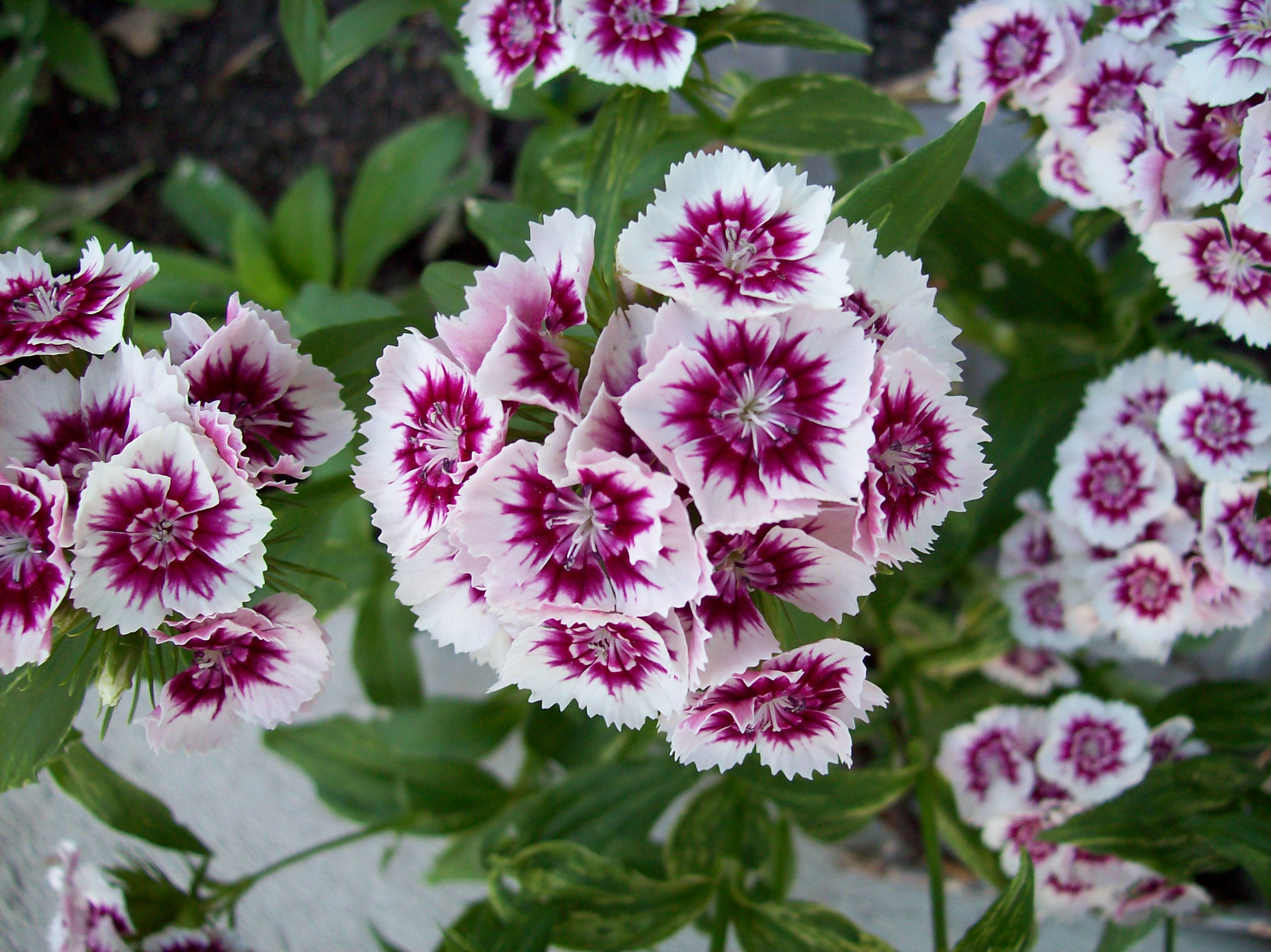
The Sweet William Dwarf plant is a biennial plant.

Biennials grown for flowers, fruits, or seeds are grown for two years, whereas those grown for edible leaves or roots are harvested after one year—and are not kept a second year to run to seed.

Examples of biennial plants are members of the onion family including leek, some members of the cabbage family, common mullein, parsley, fennel, Lunaria, silverbeet, black-eyed Susan, sweet William, colic weed, carrot, and some hollyhocks. Plant breeders have produced annual cultivars of several biennials that will flower the first year from seed, for example, foxglove and stock.

== See also ==
- Annual plant – Plant which completes its life cycle within one growing season and then dies
- Monocarpic plant – Plants that flower and set seeds only once
- Herbaceous plant – Plant that has no persistent woody stem above ground
- Perennial plant – Plant that lives for more than two years
