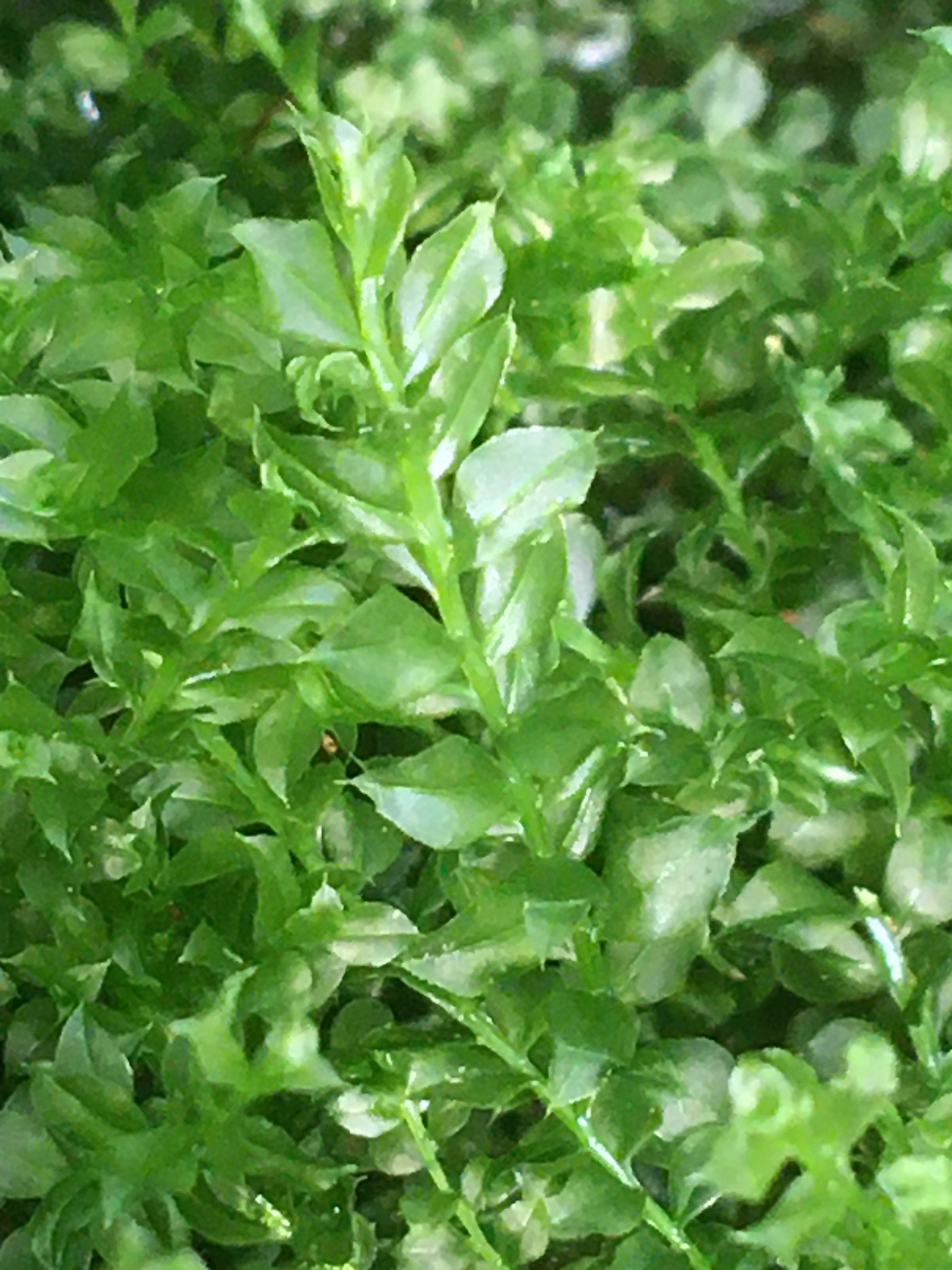

Conservation status
- Secure (NatureServe)

Scientific classification
- Kingdom: Plantae
- Division: Bryophyta
- Class: Bryopsida
- Subclass: Bryidae
- Order: Bryales
- Family: Mniaceae
- Genus: Plagiomnium
- Species: P. cuspidatum

Binomial name
- Plagiomnium cuspidatum (Hedw.) T. Kop.
- Plagiomnium cuspidatum global distribution

Synonyms
- List: Hypnum aciphyllum F. Weber & D. Mohr; Mnium affine var. humile Milde; Mnium cuspidatum Hedw.; Mnium silvaticum Lindb.

= Plagiomnium cuspidatum =

Species of moss

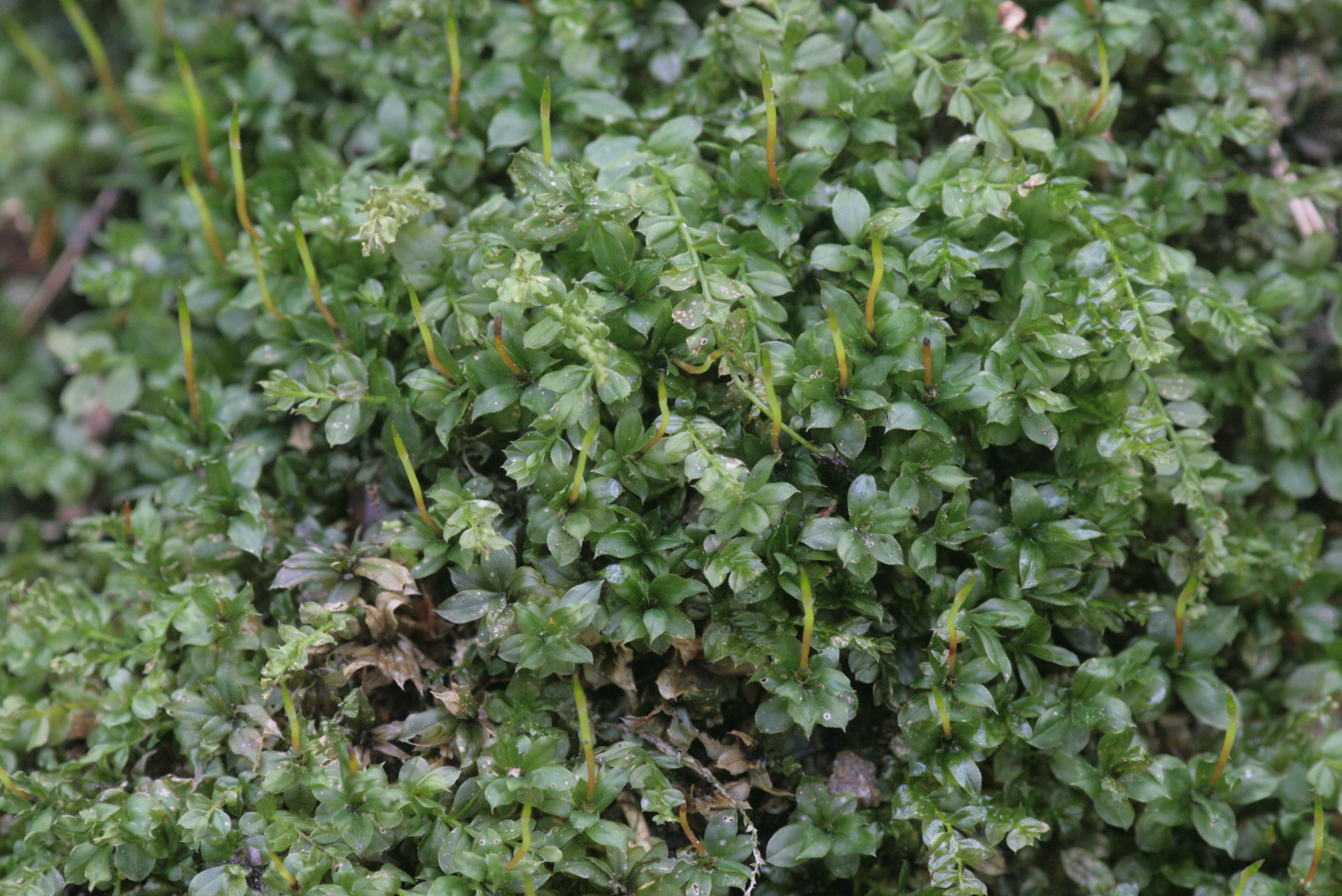
Gametophyte (leafy vegetation) and sporophyte (upright stalks) generations of Plagiomnium cuspidatum

Plagiomnium cuspidatum, also known as toothed or "baby-tooth" plagiomnium moss and woodsy thyme-moss, is a species of thyme-moss that originated in North America, but can now also be found throughout Middle America, Africa, Northern and Southern Asia (excluding China), and Europe.

Plagiomnium cuspidatum can commonly be found growing along the base of trees, stumps, coarse woody debris, and rocks in base-rich habitats such as: wet meadows, forested rich peatlands, wet forests, fire-dependent woodlands, mesic hardwood forests, and cliff/talus at low to moderate elevations. It is commonly used by songbirds and salamanders for nesting material in the wild, and by humans as planting material in bioactive terrariums, aquariums, and paludariums due to their anti- microbial and antifungal properties. These properties are also being researched for more medicinal uses.

== Description ==
=== Leaves ===
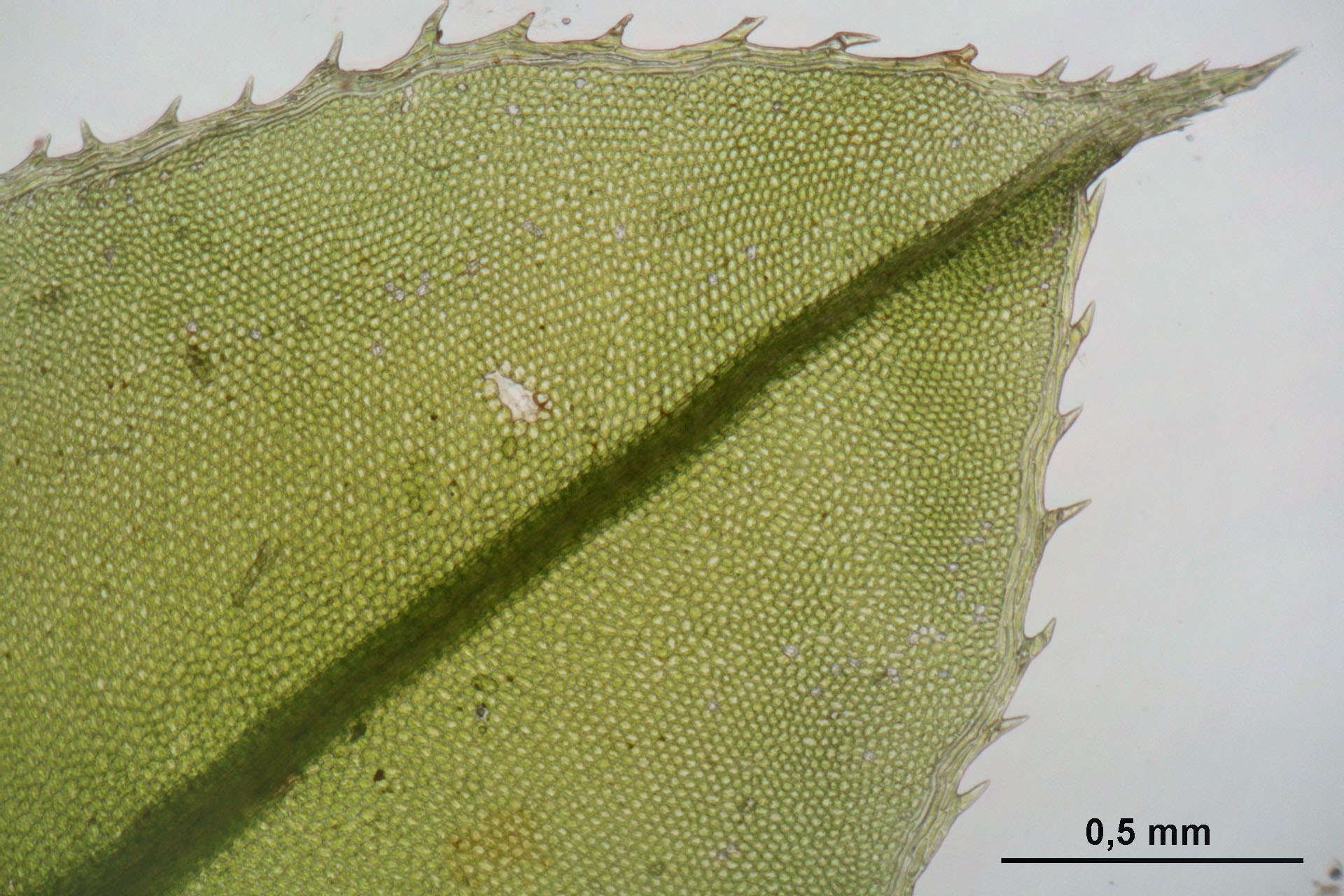
Close up image of P. cuspidatum showing sharply toothed edge and noticeable midrib (dark linear area)

Plagiomnium cuspidatum has sharp-toothed leaf margins, as its common names suggest, and can be identified from other members of the Plagiomnium genus by their leaves which measure to about 2.5–3.5 mm in length and have a tip that is tapered more gradually than other Plagiomnium species, a leaf base that runs all the way down onto the stem, and leaf cells that are elongated and clearly not arranged in diagonal rows. P. cuspidatum is often characterized as a small moss with shoots ranging from 1.5-4 cm tall and leaves roughly around 3 mm long. Leaves of P. cuspidatum gradually taper towards the tip, more so than other species in the genus. Leaf margins are sharply toothed and are absent in the lower half of the leaves while the midrib is obvious. Leaves are arranged in pseudo whorls- where the arrangement of leaves appear to originate at the same level but do not.

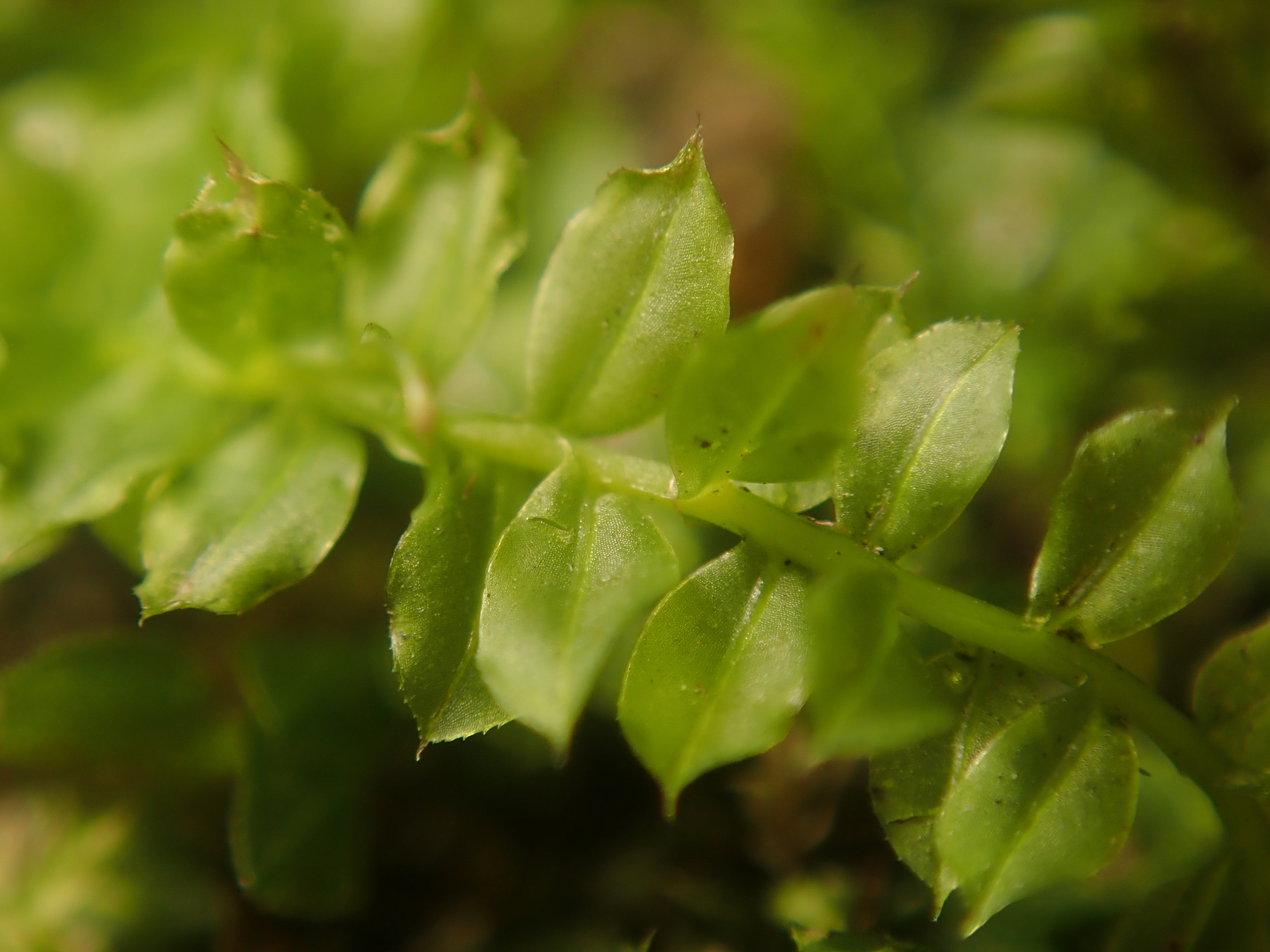
Up close view of P. cuspidatum's leaves and stems

Using a x20 hand lens, the small cells can be seen to not be in diagonal rows and no longer than wide. The non-fertile stems can be one of two descriptions: erect or curved. When aggregated together, the plant forms a green cushion-like structure. When dry, the leaves darken and begin to curl.

=== Reproductive structures ===
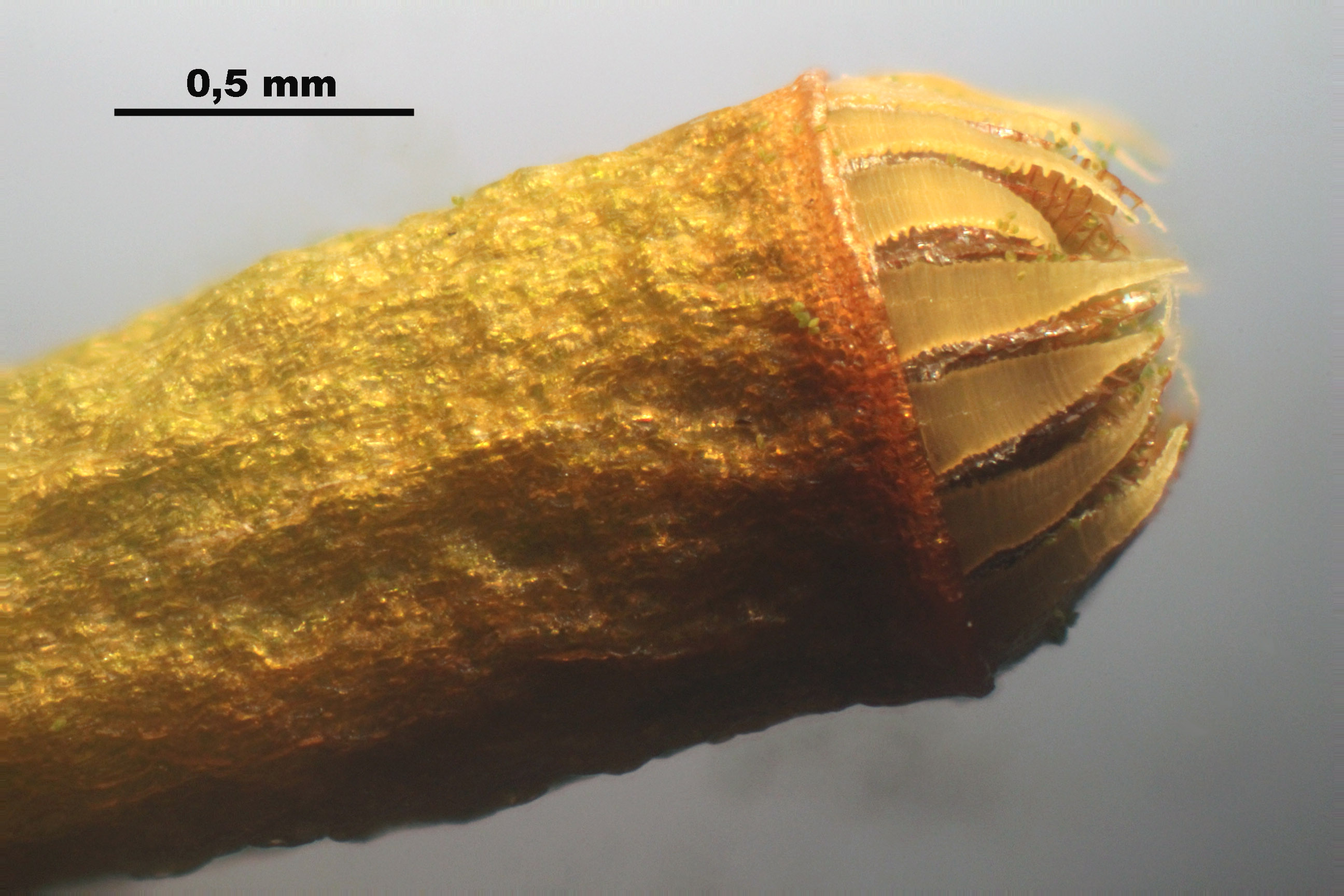
Capsule and conical lid

Plagiomnium cuspidatum do not reproduce asexually but are dioicous – having antheridia and archegonia on separate plants – and synoicous- having archegonia and antheridia on the same plant. From the foot of the plant, there can be multiple seta that raises the capsules above the plant. Capsules are frequent have a conical lid. Spores range from 18-40μm and are numerous inside the capsule.

== Distribution ==
Plagiomnium cuspidatum originated in North America, but can now also be found throughout Middle America, Africa, Northern and Southern Asia (excluding China), and Europe. It is widely distributed throughout North America and Europe, but is less commonly found in Africa and Eastern Asia. Throughout North America, it can be predominantly found in the warmer, humid areas of the continent, though it can still be found and survive in more cool climates as well.

Plagiomnium cuspidatum is known to be able to use artificial light to grow in places which are otherwise devoid of natural light, such as Crystal Cave in Wisconsin.

== Ecology ==
Within North America and Europe, P. cuspidatum is often found growing along the base of trees, stumps, coarse woody debris, and rocks in base-rich habitats such as: wet meadows, forested rich peatlands, wet forests, fire-dependent woodlands, mesic hardwood forests, and cliff/talus at low to moderate elevations.

The moss is often used by songbirds to make the inner lining of their nest and by four-toed salamanders (Hemidactylium scutatum) when nesting to prevent movement of their eggs. Located at the bottom of the mosses, the rhizomes are used by the salamanders to attach their eggs to, which aids in stabilization.

== Uses ==
=== Cultivation ===
It can be used as a planting medium in bioactive terrariums, aquariums, and paludariums too due to its anti-microbial and antifungal properties. Its ability to retain high humidity levels and grow in mats or carpets, which provides great cover for the tank's "clean-up crew", also make it perfect for the hobby.

=== Medicinal ===
In many bryophytes, there have been antibacterial, antiviral, and antioxidant properties associated with certain species. P. cuspidatum is able to produce substances that can inhibit bacteria and fungi. But due to these substances being unstable, they have not been able to be used in the medical field but have garnered some attention for its potential use. The instability of the substance stems from the substance being produced while the moss is under stress and a variety of species produce a variety of substances. It has been seen that P. cuspidatum showes resistance to methicillin-resistant Staphylococcus aureus, commonly known as MRSA. Also, the extracts of P. cuspidatum studied have shown promising antiproliferative activities against cancer cell lines in which 50% inhibition or more was achieved when testing on cervical, ovarian, and breast cancer cell lines. The extracts of P. cuspidatum, flavonoids, have been a topic of interest. Flavonoids are polyphenolic secondary metabolites that are commonly consumed in human diets. A few of the major flavonoids of P. cuspidatum are saponarine, luteolin, and apigenin-7-O-neohesperidoside.
