= Plant evolution =

Subset of evolutionary phenomena that concern plants

Cladogram of plant evolution

Plant evolution is the subset of evolutionary phenomena that concern plants. Evolutionary phenomena are characteristics of populations that are described by averages, medians, distributions, and other statistical methods. This distinguishes plant evolution from plant development, a branch of developmental biology which concerns the changes that individuals go through in their lives.

The study of plant evolution attempts to explain how the present diversity of plants arose over geologic time. It includes the study of genetic change and the consequent variation that often results in speciation, one of the most important types of radiation into taxonomic groups called clades. A description of radiation is called a phylogeny and is often represented by type of diagram called a phylogenetic tree.

== Evolutionary trends ==
Differences between plant and animal physiology and reproduction cause minor differences in how they evolve.

One major difference is the totipotent nature of plant cells, allowing them to reproduce asexually much more easily than most animals. They are also capable of polyploidy – where more than two chromosome sets are inherited from the parents. This allows relatively fast bursts of evolution to occur, for example by the effect of gene duplication. The long periods of dormancy that seed plants can employ also makes them less vulnerable to extinction, as they can "sit out" the tough periods and wait until more clement times to leap back to life.

The effect of these differences is most profoundly seen during extinction events. These events, which wiped out between 6 and 62% of terrestrial animal families, had "negligible" effect on plant families. However, the ecosystem structure is significantly rearranged, with the abundances and distributions of different groups of plants changing profoundly. These effects are perhaps due to the higher diversity within families, as extinction – which was common at the species level – was very selective. For example, wind-pollinated species survived better than insect-pollinated taxa, and specialised species generally lost out. In general, the surviving taxa were rare before the extinction, suggesting that they were generalists who were poor competitors when times were easy, but prospered when specialised groups became extinct and left ecological niches vacant.

During embryogenesis, plants and animals pass through a phylotypic stage that evolved independently and that causes a developmental constraint limiting morphological diversification.

== Polyploidy ==
Speciation via polyploidy: A diploid cell undergoes failed meiosis, producing diploid gametes, which self-fertilize to produce a tetraploid zygote.

Polyploidy is pervasive in plants and some estimates suggest that 30–80% of living plant species are polyploid, and many lineages show evidence of ancient polyploidy (paleopolyploidy) in their genomes. Huge explosions in angiosperm species diversity appear to have coincided with ancient genome duplications shared by many species. 15% of angiosperm and 31% of fern speciation events are accompanied by ploidy increase. Most polyploids display heterosis relative to their parental species, and may display novel variation or morphologies that may contribute to the processes of speciation and eco-niche exploitation. The mechanisms leading to novel variation in newly formed allopolyploids may include gene dosage effects (resulting from more numerous copies of genome content), the reunion of divergent gene regulatory hierarchies, chromosomal rearrangements, and epigenetic remodeling, all of which affect gene content and/or expression levels. Many of these rapid changes may contribute to reproductive isolation and speciation.

All eukaryotes probably have experienced a polyploidy event at some point in their evolutionary history. See paleopolyploidy. In many cases, these events can be inferred only through comparing sequenced genomes. Angiosperms have paleopolyploidy in their ancestry. Unexpected ancient genome duplications have recently been confirmed in mustard weed/thale cress (Arabidopsis thaliana) and rice (Oryza sativa).

== Photosynthesis ==
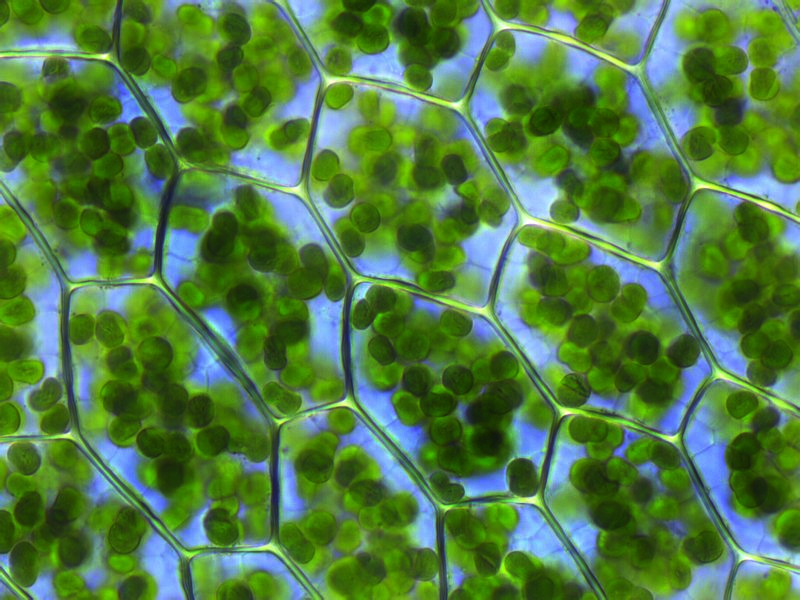
Plant cells with visible chloroplasts (from a moss, Plagiomnium affine)

=== Cyanobacteria and the evolution of photosynthesis ===
Cyanobacteria remained principal primary producers throughout the Proterozoic Eon (2500–543 Ma), in part because the redox structure of the oceans favored photoautotrophs capable of nitrogen fixation. Green algae joined blue-greens as major primary producers on continental shelves near the end of the Proterozoic, but only with the Mesozoic (251–65 Ma) radiations of dinoflagellates, coccolithophorids, and diatoms did primary production in marine shelf waters take modern form. Cyanobacteria remain critical to marine ecosystems as primary producers in oceanic gyres, as agents of biological nitrogen fixation, and, in modified form, as the plastids of marine algae.

=== Symbiosis and the origin of chloroplasts ===
Chloroplasts have many similarities with cyanobacteria, including a circular chromosome, prokaryotic-type ribosomes, and similar proteins in the photosynthetic reaction center. The endosymbiotic theory suggests that photosynthetic bacteria were acquired (by endocytosis) by early eukaryotic cells to form the first plant cells. Therefore, chloroplasts may be photosynthetic bacteria that adapted to life inside plant cells. Like mitochondria, chloroplasts still possess their own DNA, separate from the nuclear DNA of their plant host cells and the genes in this chloroplast DNA resemble those in cyanobacteria. DNA in chloroplasts codes for redox proteins such as photosynthetic reaction centers. The CoRR hypothesis proposes that this Co-location is required for Redox Regulation.

== Evolution of plant transcriptional regulation ==
Transcription factors and transcriptional regulatory networks play key roles in plant development and stress responses, as well as their evolution. During plant landing, many novel transcription factor families emerged and are preferentially wired into the networks of multicellular development, reproduction, and organ development, contributing to more complex morphogenesis of land plants.

== Flowers ==
Charles Darwin in his 1878 book The Effects of Cross and Self-Fertilization in the Vegetable Kingdom at the beginning of chapter XII noted “The first and most important of the conclusions which may be drawn from the observations given in this volume, is that generally cross-fertilisation is beneficial and self-fertilisation often injurious, at least with the plants on which I experimented.” Flowers emerged in plant evolution as an adaptation for the promotion of cross-fertilisation (outcrossing), a process that allows the masking of deleterious mutations in the genome of progeny. The genetic masking effect of cross-fertilisation sexual reproduction is known as genetic complementation. This beneficial effect of cross-fertilisation on progeny is also recognized as hybrid vigor or heterosis. Once flowers became established as an evolutionary adaptation to promote cross-fertilization, subsequent switching to inbreeding ordinarily becomes disadvantageous, largely because it allows expression of the previously masked deleterious recessive mutations, i.e. inbreeding depression.

== See also ==
- Evolutionary history of plants
- Annual vs. perennial plant evolution
