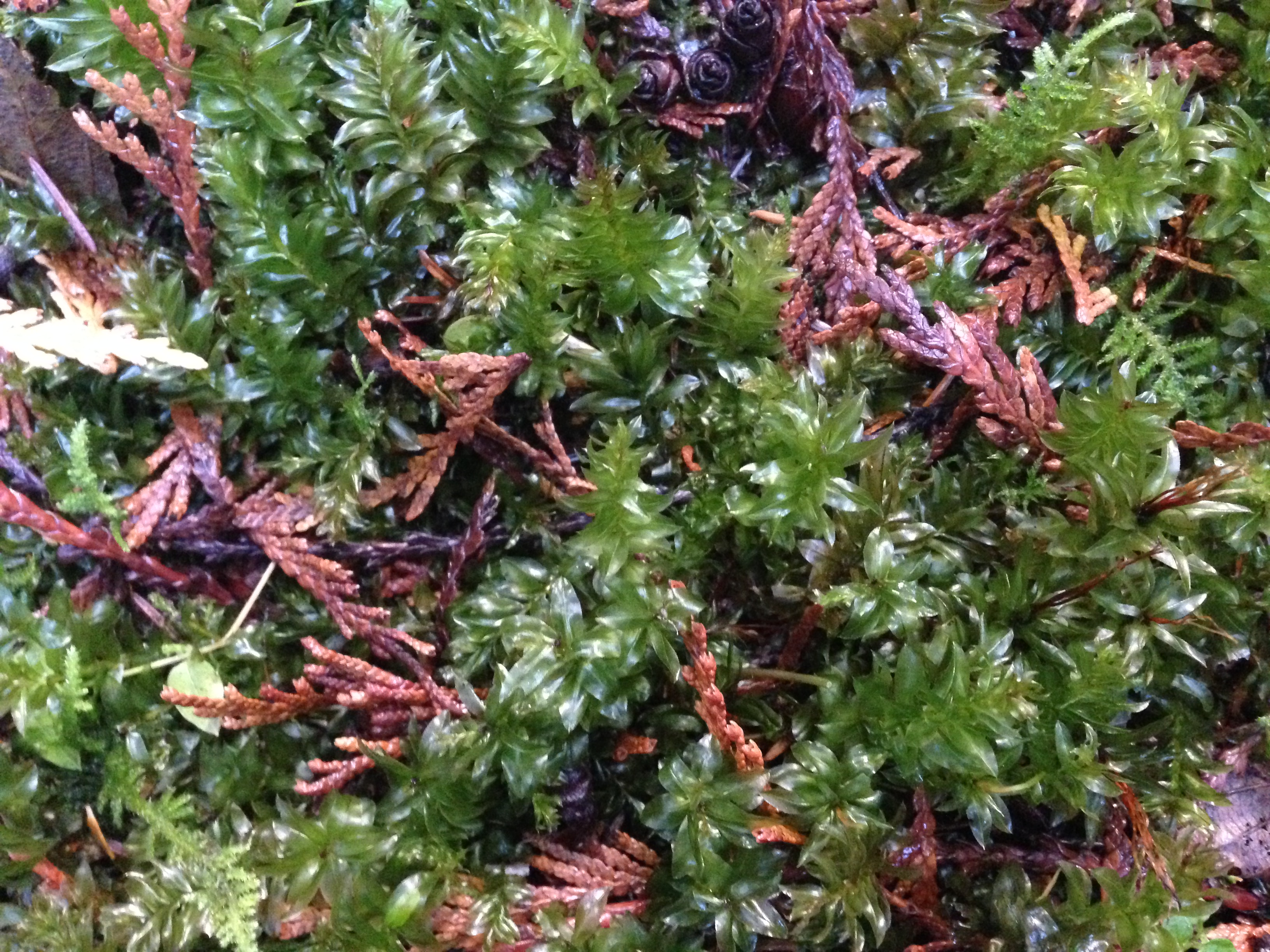
- Plagiomnium insigne

Scientific classification
- Kingdom: Plantae
- Division: Bryophyta
- Class: Bryopsida
- Subclass: Bryidae
- Order: Bryales
- Family: Mniaceae
- Genus: Plagiomnium; T.J.Kop.

= Plagiomnium =

Genus of mosses

Plagiomnium is a genus of mosses in the family Mniaceae. It was formerly a part of a more encompassing genus Mnium and in 1968 Finnish bryologist Timo Juhani Koponen justified splitting the genus into a number of smaller genera.

== Description ==
This genus is characterized by singly placed marginal teeth.

Plagiomnium are commonly found along shaded stream banks, seeps and springs, generally on soil with a high humus content.

== Species ==
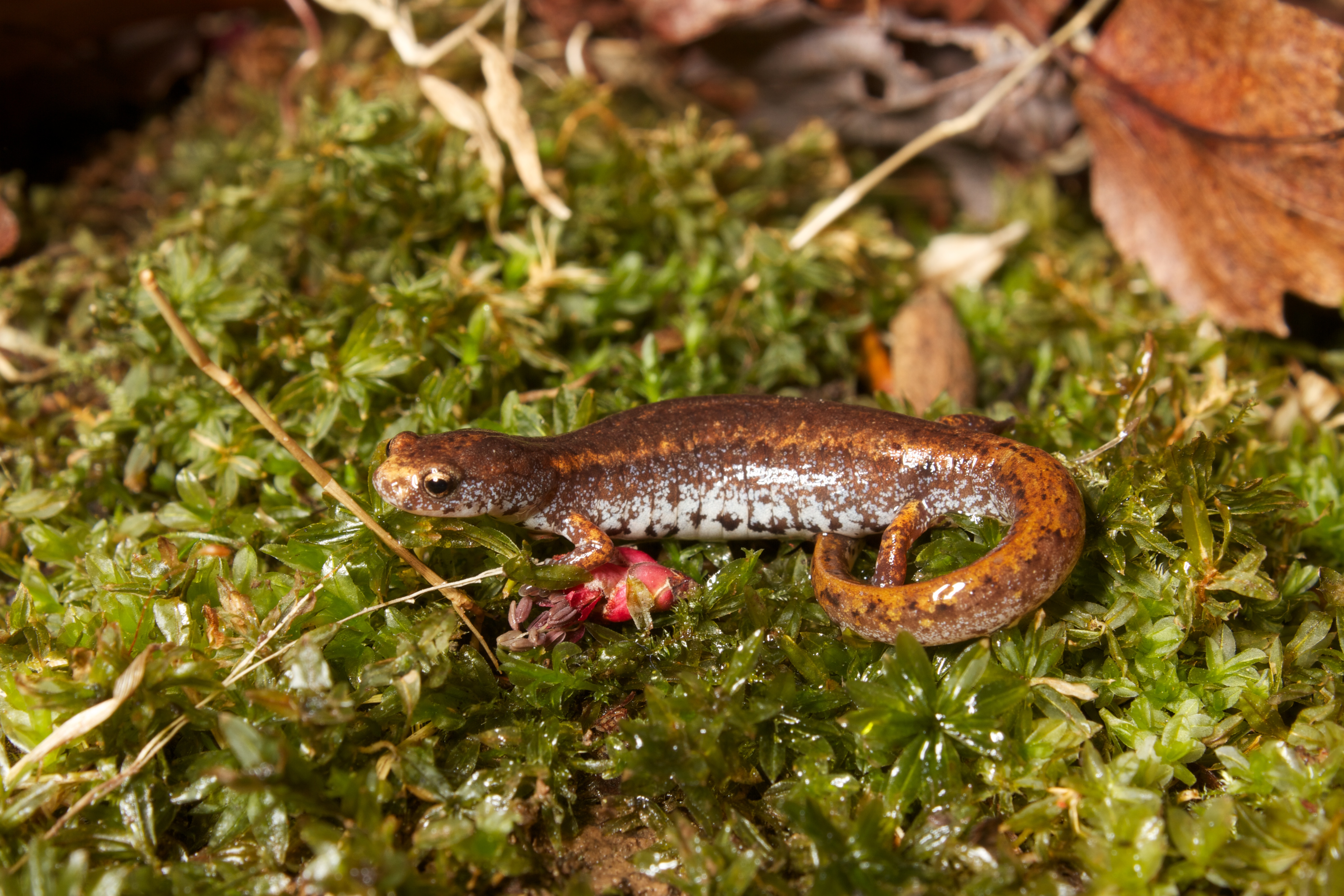
Four-toed salamander on unknown Plagiomnium moss

The genus Plagiomnium contains the following species:

- Plagiomnium acutum (Lindb.) T.J.Kop.
- Plagiomnium affine (Blandow) T.J.Kop.
- Plagiomnium arbuscula (Müll.Hal.) T.J.Kop.
- Plagiomnium ciliare (Müll.Hal.) T.J.Kop.
- Plagiomnium confertidens (Lindb. & Arnell) T.J.Kop.
- Plagiomnium cordatum T.J.Kop. & D.H.Norris
- Plagiomnium curvatulum (Lindb.) Schljakov
- Plagiomnium cuspidatum (Hedw.) T.J.Kop.
- Plagiomnium decursivum R.E.Wyatt
- Plagiomnium drummondii (Bruch & Schimp.) T.J.Kop.
- Plagiomnium elatum (Bruch & Schimp.) T.J.Kop.
- Plagiomnium elimbatum (M.Fleisch.) T.J.Kop.
- Plagiomnium ellipticum (Brid.) T.J.Kop.
- Plagiomnium floridanum R.E.Wyatt & Odrzyk.
- Plagiomnium guizhouense Y.J.Yi & S.He
- Plagiomnium himalayanum T.J.Kop.
- Plagiomnium insigne (Mitt.) T.J.Kop.
- Plagiomnium integrum (Bosch & Sande Lac.) T.J.Kop.
- Plagiomnium japonicum (Lindb.) T.J.Kop.
- Plagiomnium jiuzhaigouense R.E.Wyatt
- Plagiomnium maximoviczii (Lindb.) T.J.Kop.
- Plagiomnium medium (Bruch & Schimp.) T.J.Kop.
- Plagiomnium novae-zealandiae (Colenso) T.J.Kop.
- Plagiomnium rhynchophorum (Harv.) T.J.Kop.
- Plagiomnium rostratum (Schrad.) T.J.Kop.
- Plagiomnium succulentum (Mitt.) T.J.Kop.
- Plagiomnium tezukae (Sakurai) T.J.Kop.
- Plagiomnium undulatum (Hedw.) T.J.Kop.
- Plagiomnium venustum (Mitt.) T.J.Kop.
- Plagiomnium vesicatum (Besch.) T.J.Kop.
- Plagiomnium wui (T.J.Kop.) Y.J.Yi & S.He
- Plagiomnium yunnanense (T.J.Kop., X.J.Li & M.Zang) T.J.Kop.
