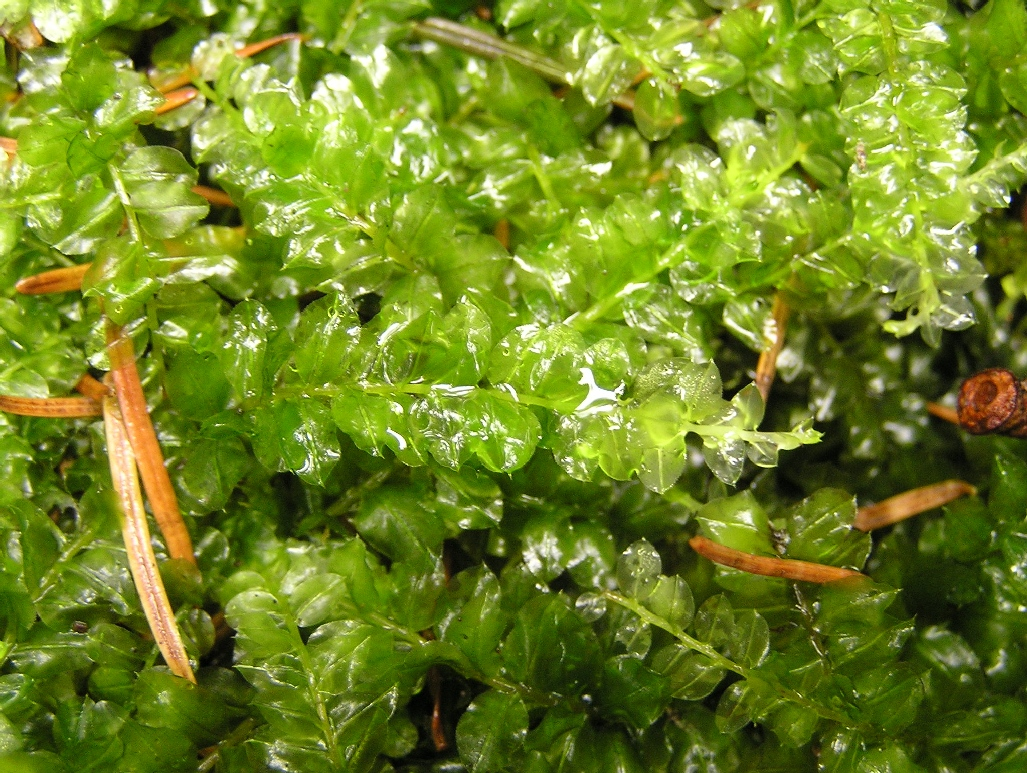

Scientific classification
- Kingdom: Plantae
- Division: Bryophyta
- Class: Bryopsida
- Subclass: Bryidae
- Order: Bryales
- Family: Mniaceae
- Genus: Plagiomnium
- Species: P. affine

Binomial name
- Plagiomnium affine (Blandow ex Funck) T. Kop.

= Plagiomnium affine =

Many-fruited thyme-moss

Species of thyme-moss from old-growth boreal forests

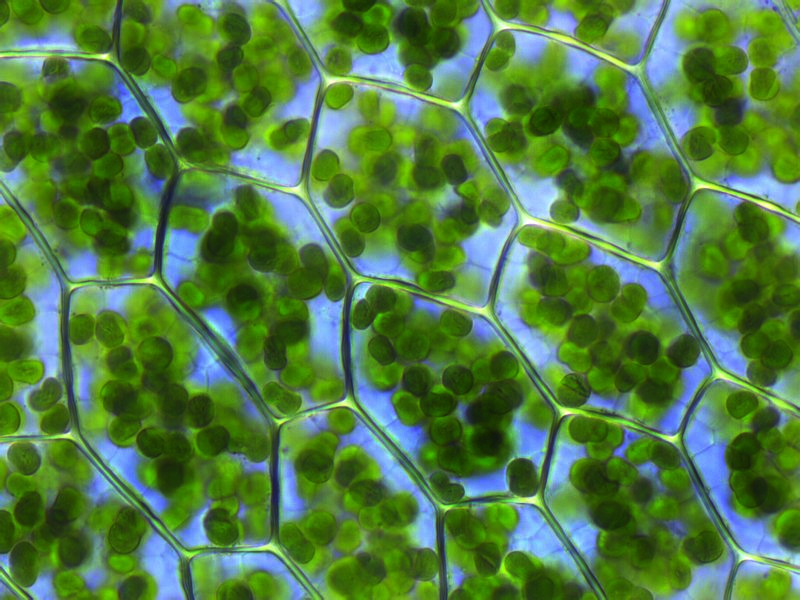
Chloroplasts in leaf cells

Plagiomnium affine, the many-fruited thyme-moss, is a species of thyme-moss found in old-growth boreal forests in North America, Europe and Asia, growing in moist, but not wet, basic to slightly acidic micro-habitats in woodland and turf. ('Plagio' = oblique, 'Mnium' = genus of thyme-moss)

Forming low lawns, stems are usually some 2 cm long, with densely packed leaves, though 10 cm long trailing infertile stems have only sparse leaves, smaller than those on fertile stems. Leaves strongly curled when dry, spreading plane when moist, the basal leaves broadly elliptic to rounded, those at the apex mucronate. Leaf edges of bases decurrent on the stem, the upper leaves oblong to lingulate and constricted at the base, toothed. The leaf cells are arranged in diagonal rows and are easily discerned with a lens.

Experiments to determine the efficacy of cryoprotectants show that the leaf covering is relatively impermeable to sugars, proline, and polyethylene glycols, but that dimethylsulfoxide is readily absorbed. Even so, it was found that frost hardiness is accompanied by a steep rise in cell sucrose concentration. Cryoprotective compounds may play a major role in the frost tolerance of bryophytes.

== Synonyms ==
- Astrophyllum cuspidatum Lindb.
- Bryum aciphyllum Voit
- Bryum affine (Blandow ex Funck) Brid.
- Mnium affine Blandow ex Funck
- Mnium cuspidatum Neck. ex Lindb.
- Mnium cuspidatum var. affine (Blandow ex Funck) Sommerf.
