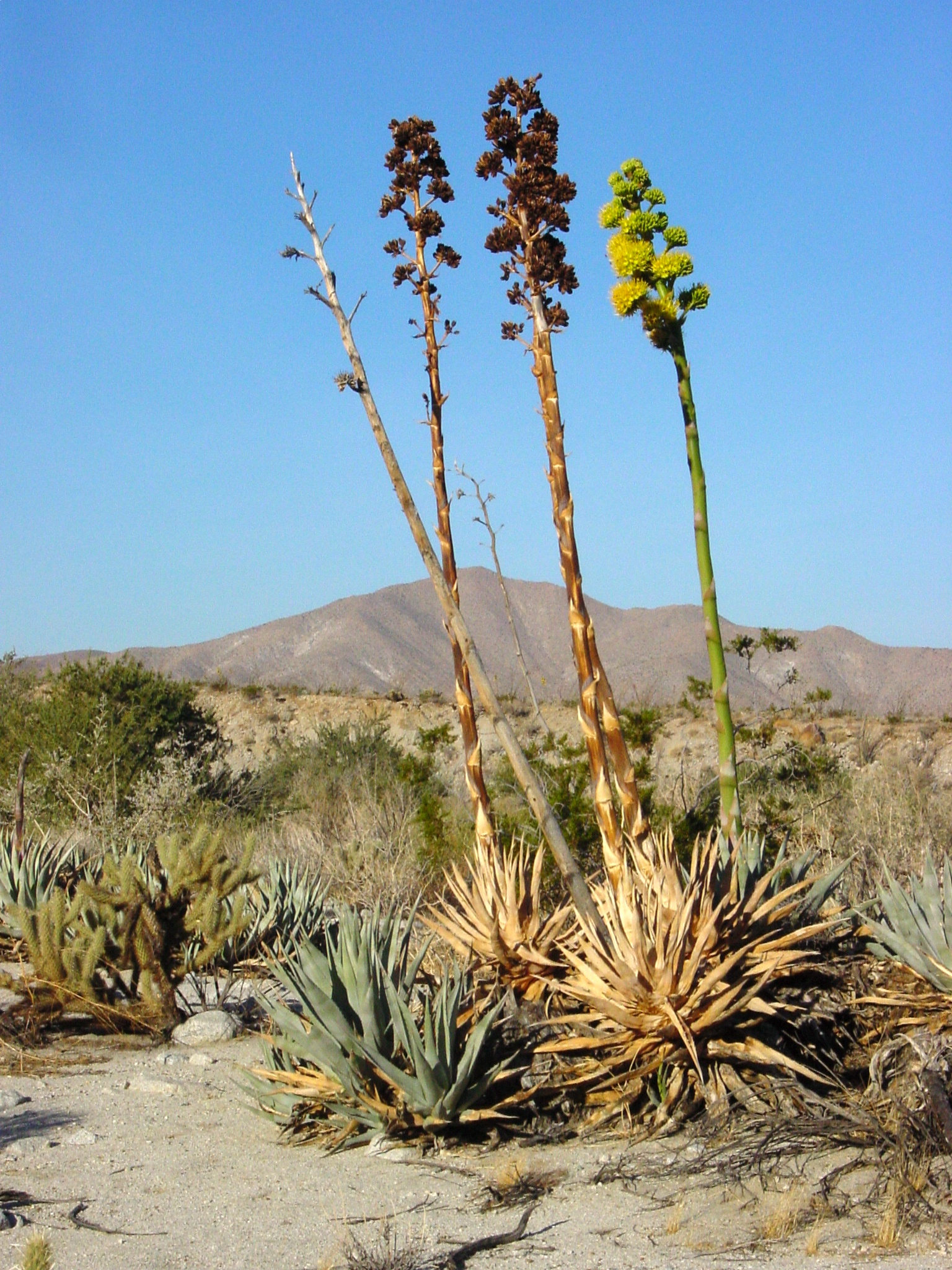

Conservation status
- Least Concern (IUCN 3.1)

Scientific classification
- Kingdom: Plantae
- Clade: Tracheophytes
- Clade: Angiosperms
- Clade: Monocots
- Order: Asparagales
- Family: Asparagaceae
- Subfamily: Agavoideae
- Genus: Agave
- Species: A. deserti

Binomial name
- Agave deserti Engelm.

Synonyms
- Agave consociata Trel.

= Agave deserti =

Desert agave

Species of flowering plant

Agave deserti (desert agave, mescal, century plant or maguey) is an agave native to desert regions in southern California, Arizona, and Baja California. Its tall yellow flower stalks dot dry rocky slopes and washes throughout the spring.

It forms a rosette of fleshy gray-green leaves 20–70 cm long and 4.5–10 cm broad, with sharp spines along the edges and at the tips. It flowers at maturity (20 to 40 years), sending up an inflorescence 2–6 m tall. The panicle bears numerous yellow, funnel-shaped flowers 3–6 cm long.

There are two varieties:

- Agave deserti var. deserti. Plants usually with numerous rosettes; perianth tube 3–5 mm. Southern California only.
- Agave deserti var. simplex (Gentry) W.C.Hodgson & Reveal. Plants usually with one or only a few rosettes; perianth tube 5–10 mm. Southern California and Arizona.

== Cultivation and uses ==
The desert agave is drought-tolerant but requires good drainage.

The desert-dwelling Native Americans used fibers from the leaves to make cloth, bowstrings, and rope. Young flower stalks (roasted), buds, and hearts of plants (also roasted) were eaten. Natives of southern California commonly harvested the "heads" using a specialized digging stick and roasted the leaves and heart alike. Food thus obtained often became a dietary staple, even into drought years.

Alcoholic drinks were also manufactured from the sweet juices of this and other agaves.

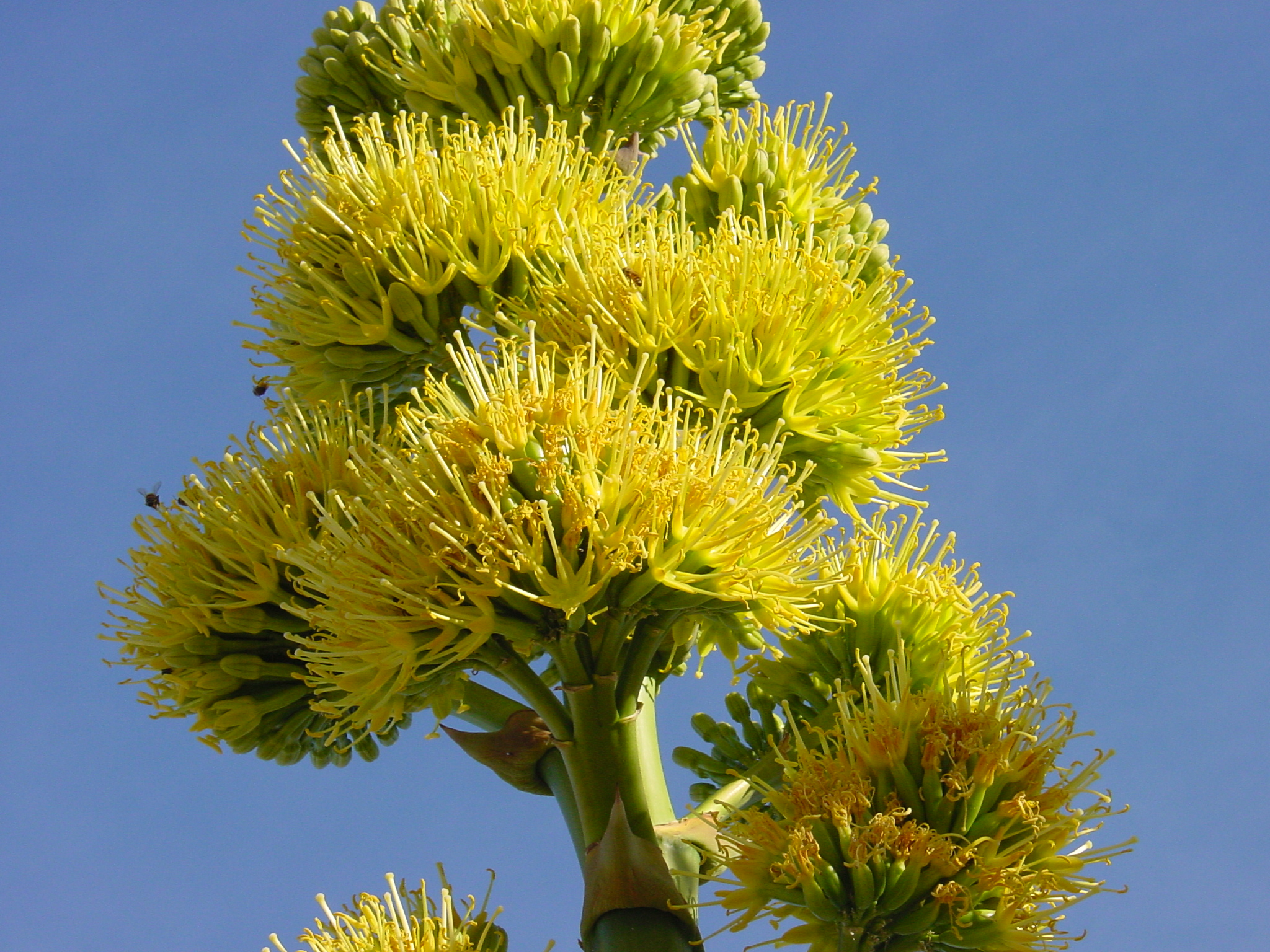
A mass of flowers on an inflorescence

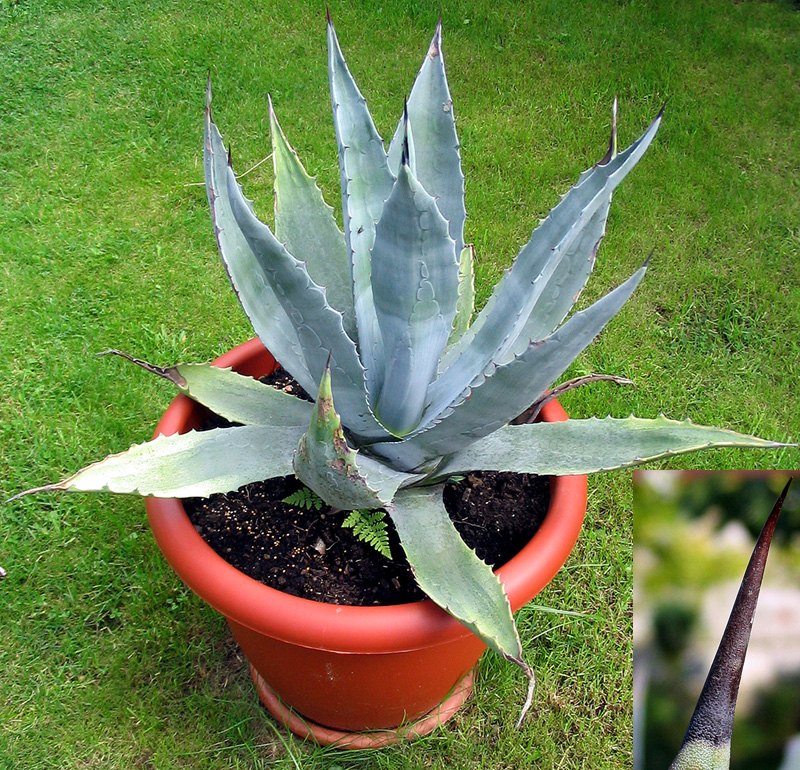
In cultivation

== Sources ==
- Flora of North America: Agave deserti
- C.Michael Hogan ed. 2010. "Agave deserti". Encyclopedia of Life
- Jepson Flora Project: Agave deserti
- Dole, Jim W. and Rose, Betty B., Shrubs and Trees of the Southern California Deserts, 1996, Foot-Loose Press.
