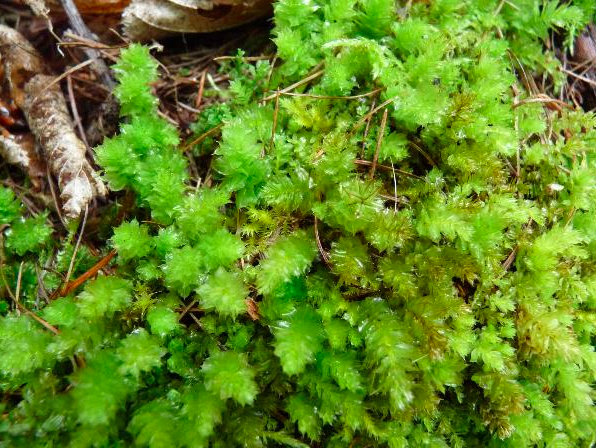

Scientific classification
- Kingdom: Plantae
- Division: Bryophyta
- Class: Bryopsida
- Subclass: Bryidae
- Order: Bryales
- Family: Mniaceae
- Genus: Plagiomnium
- Species: P. venustum

Binomial name
- Plagiomnium venustum (Mitt.) T.J.Kop.

Synonyms
- Mnium venustum Mitt.

= Plagiomnium venustum =

Species of moss

Plagiomnium venustum, also known as magnificent leafy moss, is a species of moss belonging to the family Mniaceae. It is found mainly in western North America along the coastal region. This moss can be identified from other members of the Plagiomnium genus by dark coloured stomata guard cells and the absence of sterile stems. It is most commonly found growing as a mat on a variety of substrate, but mainly on humus and moist soil.

== Range and habitat ==
Majority of the Plagiomnium venustum species have been recorded in British Columbia, Canada and Oregon, United States, making it a Pacific Coast Bryophyte. However, some have also been found in Washington, Idaho, and Montana, United States. They are most common on low to moderate elevations.

This moss likes to grow in moist soil of forest floors, on tree trunks, rotten tree logs, and on rocks and cliffs.

== Morphology ==
Plagiomnium venustum exhibits an acrocarpous growth form, so the shoots are upright and unbranched.

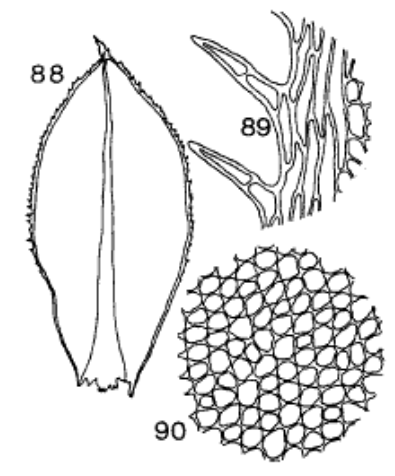
Leaves, leaf apex, laminal cells

=== Gametophyte ===
It has green to green-yellow leaves that start large near the apex and become smaller and more distant from each other as they descend. They can range from obovate to elliptic in shape and between 3-7mm in length. This means that they are widest near the middle and get more narrow as they reach the leaf tip. The leaves contort and twist when dry, which can be due to the lack of stereids in the costa of the leaves, and spread out when exposed to water. Because stereids are not present to give structural support to the leaves, they easily twist. This is a unique characteristic of Plagiomnium venustum from all the other Plagiomnium species. The leaves have a toothed margin with elongated cells near the margin borders that get smaller as they approach the center. The lamina and marginal cells are unistratose and multiseriate of approximately 3-5 series.

=== Sporophyte ===
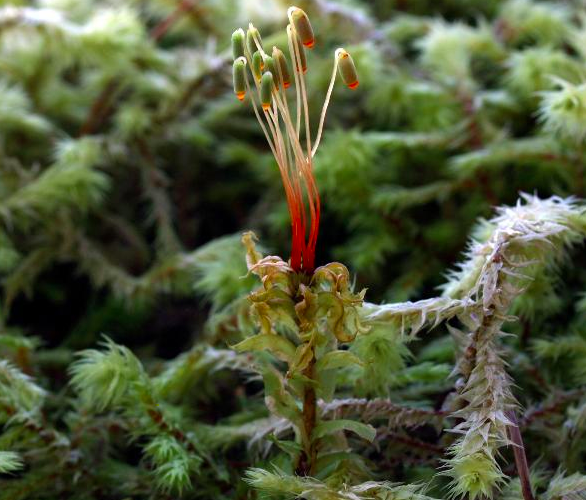
Sporophytes with nodding sporangia and dry twisted leaves

The sporophyte are attached to the gametophyte by a foot. They have a 3-4cm long seta that is red at the base. Plagiomnium venustum have nodding sporangia with a distinct brown neck. The capsule is oblong and attached to a wrinkled, brown, apiculate operculum underneath. Like most mosses of the Bryopsida class, Plagiomnium venustum contain papillose exostome teeth and endostome peristome teeth. The sporangial jacket contains mammillose stomata guard cells that are easily visible because of their dark colour. Maturation of the sporophyte happens from mid-spring to early summer, in which the spores are released.

== Distinguishing characteristics ==
P. venustum is a unique species out of all the Plagiomnium moss because of the following characteristics: It has dark coloured stomatal guard cells, densely twisted leaves around the stem when they are dry, collenchymatous lamina cells, a distinct brown and wrinkled capsule neck, and absent sterile stems.

== Reproduction ==
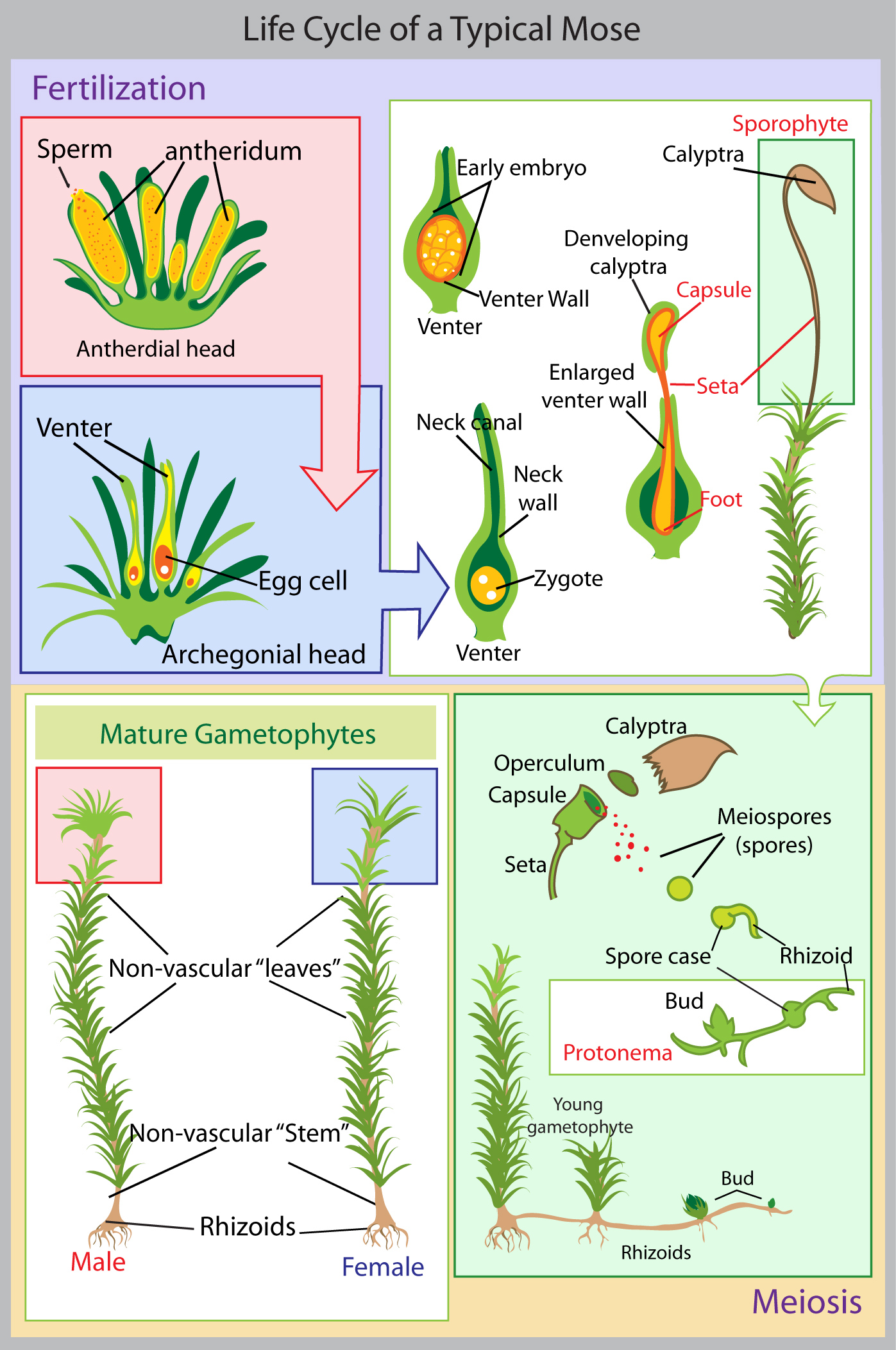
Life Cycle of a Typical Moss

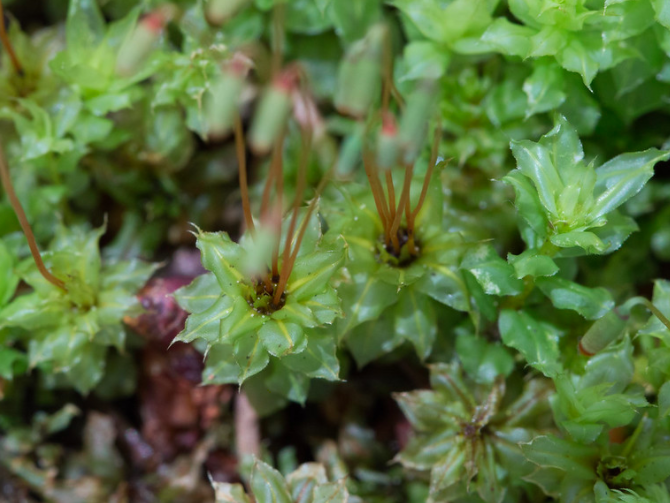
Distinct yellow midrib on perichaetial leaves.

Plagiomnium venustum is a synoecious species. This means that the antheridia and archegonia reproductive structures are on the same plant. It does not contain specialized asexual reproductive structures, like many of the Plagiomnium species. The perichaetial leaves are assembled into a rosette and have a distinct yellow midrib with multiple emerging sporophytes.

== Taxonomy ==
=== Genus Plagiomnium ===
Plagiomnium venustum is a species of moss that belongs to the genus Plagiomnium. Plagiomnium mosses are known for forming mats on their substrates. The leaves of these mosses are green and generally erect and are shaped obovate or elliptic with unistratose leaf margins. They contort when dry and spread out when damp. They have brown rhizoids. Plagiomnium also have sterile stems (except for P. venustum). On the ventral side of the leaves are a costa and many lamellae. The sporangia are nodding due to a bent seta with a capsule, operculum, and arthrodontous exostome and endostome teeth. The sporangia are covered with a hairy calyptra.

There are currently 102 species names that belong to the genus Plagiomnium (many of which are synonyms), but only 34 have been accepted. Listed below are the 34 accepted Plagiomnium species:

Name	Status
Plagiomnium acutum (Lindb.) T.J. Kop.	Accepted
Plagiomnium affine (Blandow ex Funck) T.J. Kop.	Accepted
Plagiomnium arbusculum (Müll. Hal.) T.J. Kop.	Accepted
Plagiomnium carolinianum (L.E. Anderson) T.J. Kop.	Accepted
Plagiomnium ciliare (Müll. Hal.) T.J. Kop.	Accepted
Plagiomnium cinclidioides (Huebener) M.C. Bowers	Accepted
Plagiomnium confertidens (Lindb. & Arnell) T.J. Kop.	Accepted
Plagiomnium cordatum T.J. Kop. & D.H. Norris	Accepted
Plagiomnium cuspidatum (Hedw.) T.J. Kop.	Accepted
Plagiomnium drummondii (Bruch & Schimp.) T.J. Kop.	Accepted
Plagiomnium ecklonii (Müll. Hal.) T.J. Kop.	Accepted
Plagiomnium elatum (Bruch & Schimp.) T.J. Kop.	Accepted
Plagiomnium elimbatum (M. Fleisch.) T.J. Kop.	Accepted
Plagiomnium ellipticum (Brid.) T.J. Kop.	Accepted
Plagiomnium insigne (Mitt.) T.J. Kop.	Accepted
Plagiomnium integroradiatum (Dixon) C. Gao & G.C. Zhang	Accepted
Plagiomnium integrum (Bosch & Sande Lac.) T.J. Kop.	Accepted
Plagiomnium japonicum (Lindb.) T.J. Kop.	Accepted
Plagiomnium kawadei (S. Okamura) Z. Iwats.	Accepted
Plagiomnium maximoviczii (Lindb.) T.J. Kop.	Accepted
Plagiomnium medium (Bruch & Schimp.) T.J. Kop.	Accepted
Plagiomnium novae-zealandiae (Colenso) T.J. Kop.	Accepted
Plagiomnium prorepens (Müll. Hal.) T.J. Kop.	Accepted
Plagiomnium rhynchophorum (Harv.) T.J. Kop.	Accepted
Plagiomnium rostratum (Schrad.) T.J. Kop.	Accepted
Plagiomnium rugicum (Laurer) T.J. Kop.	Accepted
Plagiomnium speciosum (Mitt.) M.C. Bowers	Accepted
Plagiomnium subelimbatum (Dixon) T.J. Kop.	Accepted
Plagiomnium succulentum (Mitt.) T.J. Kop.	Accepted
Plagiomnium tezukae (Sakurai) T.J. Kop.	Accepted
Plagiomnium trichomanes (Mitt.) T.J. Kop.	Accepted
Plagiomnium undulatum (Hedw.) T.J. Kop.	Accepted
Plagiomnium venustum (Mitt.) T.J. Kop.	Accepted
Plagiomnium vesicatum (Besch.) T.J. Kop.	Accepted

== Conservation status ==
Plagiomnium venustum is globally listed as G4. In Canada, it has been listed as N4N5 and in British Columbia its Conservation Status Rank is S4S5. Based on these statistics, BC has also assigned P. venustum to the "Yellow" List, which means that this species is at the least risk of being lost.
